= List of Vogue Deutsch cover models =

This list of Vogue Deutsch cover models (1979–present) is a catalog of cover models who have appeared on the cover of Vogue Deutsch, the German edition of American fashion magazine Vogue. The magazine is also known as Vogue Germany.

== 1970s ==
=== 1979 ===
Issue	Cover model	Photographer
August	Nina Klepp	Chris von Wangenheim
September	Eva Voorhees	Eric Boman
October	Kelly Emberg	Michael Reinhardt
November	Karen Howard	Albert Watson
December	Juli Foster	Albert Watson

== 1980s ==
=== 1980 ===
Issue	Cover model	Photographer
January	Rosemary McGrotha	Denis Piel
February	Kim Alexis	John Stember
March	Michelle Stevens	Francesco Scavullo
April	Brooke Shields	Richard Avedon
May	Kelly Emberg	John Stember
June	Barbara Neumann	John Stember
July	Kelly Emberg	John Stember
August	Dalila Di Lazzaro	Elisabetta Catalano
September	Brooke Shields	Bill King
October	Karen Howard	François Lamy
November	Sheila Berger	Fabrizio Ferri
December	Sylvie Benoit	Fabrizio Ferri

=== 1981 ===
Issue	Cover model	Photographer
January	Kelly Le Brock	Albert Watson
February	Eva Johanson	Albert Watson
March	Kelly Le Brock	Bill King
April	Charlotte Rampling	Bill King
May	Paulina Porizkova	John Swanell
June	Andrea Malkiewicz	Albert Watson
July	Kelly Emberg	Bill King
August	Catherine Deneuve	Toni Kent
September	Eva Johanson	Albert Watson
October	Rosie Vela	Andrea Blanche
November	Rosemary McGrotha	Bill King
December	Anette Stai	Bill King

=== 1982 ===
Issue	Cover model	Photographer
January	Carol Alt	Bill King
February	Isabella Rossellini	Bill King
March	Anette Stai	Bill King
April	Terry Farrell	Bill King
May	Rosemary McGrotha	Bill King
June	Iman	Albert Watson
July	Eva Voorhees	Albert Watson
August	Isabella Rossellini	Bill King
September	Angela Schottenhamel	Bill King
October	Jil Sander	Bill King
November	Nastassja Kinski	Herb Ritts
December	Ornella Muti	Renato Grignaschi

=== 1983 ===
Issue	Cover model	Photographer
January	Kelly Emberg	Bill King
February	Lise Brand	Sofia Riva
March	Renée Simonsen	Bert Stern
April	Renée Simonsen	Albert Watson
May	Lisa Ticknor	Albert Watson
June	Rosemary McGrotha	Eric Boman
July	Rosie Vela	Bill King
August	Isabelle Adjani	Dominique Issermann
September	Renée Simonsen	Bill King
October	Susan Hess	Bill King
November	Pam Ross	Albert Watson
December	Talisa Soto	Albert Watson

=== 1984 ===
Issue	Cover model	Photographer
January	Isabella Rossellini	Bill King
February	Annabel Schofield	James Moore
March	Brooke Shields	Bill King
April	Renée Simonsen	Bill King
May	Joanna Pacuła	Bill King
June	Jennifer Beals	Bill King
July	Catherine Deneuve	David Bailey
August	Isabella Rossellini	Bill King
September	Hanna Schygulla	Sante D'Orazio
October	Maria Johnson	Bill King
November	Frauke Quast	Sante D'Orazio
December	Pia Lind	Bill King

=== 1985 ===
Issue	Cover model	Photographer
January	Kim Alexis	Bill King
February	Martina Gates	Sante D'Orazio
March	Lara Harris	Sante D'Orazio
April	Jil Sander	Francesco Scavullo
May	Désirée Nosbusch	Eric Boman
June	Raquel Welch	Bill King
July	Princess Stéphanie of Monaco	Eric Boman
August	Catherine Deneuve	David Bailey
September	Joanna Pacuła	Bill King
October	Alexa Singer	Eric Boman
November	Nina Hagen	Tony Viramontes
December	Caroline, Princess of Hanover	Helmut Newton

=== 1986 ===
Issue	Cover model	Photographer
January	Kelly Le Brock	Eric Boman
February	Isabella Rossellini	Eric Boman
March	Annette de Klier	Renato Grignaschi
April	Rosemary McGrotha	Eric Boman
May	Kim Alexis	Eric Boman
June	Renée Simonsen	Bill King
July	Rosemary McGrotha	Tony Viramontes
August	Isabella Rossellini	Bill King
September	Cindy Crawford	Eric Boman
October	Jeanette Hallen	Eric Boman
November	Jeanette Hallen	Eric Boman
December	Tara D'ambrosio	Albert Watson

=== 1987 ===
Issue	Cover model	Photographer
January	Christy Turlington	Bill King
February	Cindy Crawford	Bill King
March	Rosemary McGrotha	Eric Boman
April	Christy Turlington	Eric Boman
May	Renée Simonsen	Eric Boman
June	Christy Turlington	Eric Boman
July	Cindy Crawford	Rico Puhlmann
August	Paulina Porizkova	Eric Boman
September	Estelle Lefébure	Eric Boman
October	Cindy Crawford	Eric Boman
November	Linda Evangelista	Patrick Demarchelier
December	Christy Turlington	Eric Boman

=== 1988 ===
Issue	Cover model	Photographer
January	Susan Miner	Eric Boman
February	Rebecca Ghiglieri	Eric Boman
March	Cindy Crawford	Eric Boman
April	Julie Anderson	Eric Boman
May	Steevie van der Veen	Eric Boman
June	Isabella Rossellini	Eric Boman
July	Stephanie Seymour	Eric Boman
August	Rachel Williams	Eric Boman
September	Paulina Porizkova	Eric Boman
October	Lauren Lindberg	Eric Boman
November	Nadine Hennelly	Eric Boman
December	Linda Evangelista	Eric Boman

=== 1989 ===
Issue	Cover model	Photographer
January	Yasmin Le Bon, Unknown	Piero Biasion; Axel Siebmann
February	Cindy Crawford	Eric Boman
March	Estelle Lefébure	Eric Boman
April	Michaela Bercu	Tyen
May	Estelle Lefébure	Tyen
June	Vanessa Duve	Tyen
July	Charlotte & Francesca Bonicoli	Tyen
August	Cordula Reyer	Robert Erdmann
September	Dana Patrick	Tyen
October	Kara Young	Anthony Gordon
November	Cindy Crawford	Eamonn J. McCabe
December	Lynne Koester	Anthony Gordon

== 1990s ==
=== 1990 ===
Issue	Cover model	Photographer
January	Cordula Reyer	Neil Kirk
February	Larissa Fielding	Anthony Gordon
March	Mitzi Martin, Sophia Goth, Mystee Bechenbach, Dana Patrick	Dewey Nicks
April	Estelle Lefébure	Isabel Snyder
May	Claudia Schiffer	Isabel Snyder
June	Kara Young	Mark Abrahams
July	Nastassja Kinski	Koto Bolofo
August	Dana Patrick	Walter Chin
September	Yasmeen Ghauri	Robert Erdmann
October	Gail Elliott	Mark Abrahams
November	Vera Cox	Mark Abrahams
December	Yasmin Le Bon	Robert Erdmann

=== 1991 ===
Issue	Cover model	Photographer
January	Claudia Schiffer	Neil Kirk
February	Daniela Peštová	Lothar Schmid
March	Mitzi Martin, Unknown	Mark Abrahams
April	Vera Cox, Unknown	Mark Abrahams
May	Yasmeen Ghauri	Walter Chin
June	Julia Roberts	Herb Ritts
July	Gisele Zelauy	Walter Chin
August	Suzanne Lanza; Deryl George; Eduardo Bobadilla; Antonio Sabàto, Jr.	Paul Lange
September	Daniela Peštová	Paul Lange
October	Christy Turlington	Francesco Scavullo
November	Kara Young	Paul Lange
December	Christy Turlington	Francesco Scavullo

=== 1992 ===
Issue	Cover model	Photographer
January	Estelle Lefébure	Paul Lange
February	Catherine Deneuve	Mario Testino
March	Jil Sander	Sheila Metzner
April	Jessica Lange	Steven Meisel
May	Linda Evangelista	Francesco Scavullo
June	Yasmeen Ghauri	Mario Testino
July	Tatjana Patitz	Mario Testino
August	Linda Evangelista	Mario Testino
September	Claudia Schiffer	Walter Chin
October	Helena Barquilla	Ferdinando Scianna
November	Tatjana Patitz	Mario Testino
December	Daryl Hannah	Michel Comte

=== 1993 ===
Issue	Cover model	Photographer
January	Angelika Kallio	Tyen
February	Tatjana Patitz	Walter Chin
March	Lucie de la Falaise	Doug Ordway
April	Beverly Peele; Claudia Mason; Jenny Brunt	Walter Chin
May	Amber Valletta	Doug Ordway
June	Yasmeen Ghauri	Walter Chin
July	Claudia Schiffer	André Rau
August	Christy Turlington	David Bailey
September	Yasmeen Ghauri	Sheila Metzner
October	Marisa Berenson; Starlite Melody Randall (Daughter)	Michael Williams
November	Kelly Lynch	Doug Ordway
December	Nastassja Kinski	Wayne Maser

=== 1994 ===
Issue	Cover model	Photographer
January	Tatjana Patitz	Walter Chin
February	Linda Evangelista	Richard Avedon
March	Jaime Rishar	Doug Ordway
April	Beri Smither	Albert Watson
May	Jane March	Wayne Maser
June	Yasmeen Ghauri	Michael Williams
July	Nicole Maddox Grayson	Albert Watson
August	Isabelle Adjani	Max Vadukul
September	Claudia Schiffer	Wayne Maser
October	Naomi Campbell	Albert Watson
November	Jaime Rishar	Walter Chin
December	Jaime Rishar	Walter Chin

=== 1995 ===
Issue	Cover model	Photographer
January	Nadja Auermann	Christophe Kutner
February	Debbie Deitering	Francesca Sorrenti
March	Christy Turlington	Walter Chin
April	Linda Evangelista	Steven Meisel
May	Nadja Auermann	Christophe Kutner
June	Carla Bruni; Carré Otis; Christy Turlington; Debbie Deitering; Jaime Rishar; Michele Hicks; Tatjana Patitz; Yasmeen Ghauri; Meghan Douglas; Nadja Auermann; Shalom Harlow; Karen Mulder; Amber Valletta; Linda Evangelista; Nadège du Bospertus; Claudia Schiffer; Eva Herzigová; Stephanie Seymour; Chrystèle Saint Louis Augustin; Helena Christensen; Kate Moss; Bridget Hall; Naomi Campbell; Kristen McMenamy	Albert Watson; Angelica Blechschmidt; Christophe Kutner; Doug Ordway; Francesca Sorrenti; Mario Testino; Michael Gregonowits; Roxanne Lowit; Walter Chin; Wayne Maser
July	Kate Moss	Mario Testino
August	Trish Goff	Mark Abrahams
September	Stephanie Seymour	Martin Lidell
October	Yasmeen Ghauri	Walter Chin
November	Isabella Rossellini	Marc Hom
December	Tatjana Patitz	Mark Abrahams

=== 1996 ===
Issue	Cover model	Photographer
January	Tasha Tilberg	Raymond Meier
February	Chrystèle Saint-Louis Augustin	Ruvén Afanador
March	Michele Hicks	Marc Hom
April	Nadja Auermann	Mark Abrahams
May	Kirsty Hume	Mark Abrahams
June	Stella Tennant	Mark Abrahams
July	Shalom Harlow	Mario Testino
August	Trish Goff	Mark Abrahams
September	Chandra North; Carolyn Murphy	Mark Abrahams
October	Isabella Rossellini	Ruvén Afanador
November	Linda Evangelista	Mark Abrahams
December	Elizabeth Hurley	Marc Hom

=== 1997 ===
Issue	Cover model	Photographer
January	Esther De Jong	Walter Chin
February	Kirsty Hume	Christophe Kutner
March	Kylie Bax	Mark Abrahams
April	Naomi Campbell	Mark Abrahams
May	Isabelle Adjani	Jeff Manzetti
June	Milla Jovovich	Michelangelo Di Battista
July	Stella Tennant	Mark Abrahams
August	Kate Moss	Mark Abrahams
September	Lois Samuels; Frankie Rayder; Natane Boudreau	Walter Chin
October	Kiara Kabukuru	Ruvén Afanador
November	Christy Turlington	Mark Abrahams
December	Carolyn Murphy	Mark Abrahams

=== 1998 ===
Issue	Cover model	Photographer
January	Kirsty Hume	Mark Abrahams
February	Kylie Bax	Mark Abrahams
March	Inés Sastre	Michel Comte
April	Eugenia Silva	Michel Comte
May	Kirsty Hume	Mark Abrahams
June	Audrey Marnay	Mark Abrahams
July	Guinevere Van Seenus	Mark Abrahams
August	Elsa Benítez	Ruvén Afanador
September	Shalom Harlow	Wayne Maser
October	Kirsty Hume	Wayne Maser
November	Ling Tan	Torkil Gudnason
December	Maggie Rizer	Torkil Gudnason

=== 1999 ===
Issue	Cover model	Photographer
January	Linda Evangelista	Mark Abrahams
February	Aurélie Claudel	Regan Cameron
March	Audrey Marnay	Mark Abrahams
April	Amber Valletta	Mark Abrahams
May	Claire Forlani	Wayne Maser
June	Shalom Harlow	Mark Abrahams
July	Guinevere Van Seenus	Mark Abrahams
August	Natalie Portman	Wayne Maser
September	Dessi Pavlova; Alexandra Pavlova	Bruno Dayan
October	Adina Fohlin; Alek Wek; Anne-Catherine Lacroix; Caroline Ribeiro; Esther de Jong; Hedvig Maria Maigre; Jodi Broadhurst; Kari-Anne Liverud; Kirsten Owen; Liisa Winkler; Lydia Possner; Mathilde Pedersen; Natane Boudreau; Nina Heimlich; Satya Arteau; Teresa Lourenço; Yfke Sturm + 3 Unknown	Karl Lagerfeld
November	Erin O'Connor	Mark Abrahams
December	Audrey Marnay	Mark Abrahams

== 2000s ==
=== 2000 ===
Issue	Cover model	Photographer
January	Maggie Rizer	Mark Abrahams
February	Audrey Tchekova	Mark Abrahams
March	May Andersen	Mark Abrahams
April	Shalom Harlow	Mark Abrahams
May	Frankie Rayder	Mark Abrahams
June	Megan Shoemaker	Raymond Meier
July	Erin O'Connor	Karl Lagerfeld
August	Małgosia Bela	Mark Abrahams
September	Colette Pechekhonova	Torkil Gudnason
October	Claudia Schiffer	Mark Abrahams
November	Maggie Rizer	Mark Abrahams
December	Karen Elson	Mark Abrahams

=== 2001 ===
Issue	Cover model	Photographer
January	Erin O'Connor	Mark Abrahams
February	Mini Andén	Mark Abrahams
March	Audrey Marnay	Mark Abrahams
April	Karolína Kurková	Mark Abrahams
May	Christy Turlington	Mark Abrahams
June	Naomi Campbell	Vincent Peters
July	Devon Aoki	Karl Lagerfeld
August	Ana Cláudia Michels	Regan Cameron
September	Audrey Marnay	Mark Abrahams
October	Mini Andén	Mark Abrahams
November	Maggie Rizer	Mark Abrahams
December	Karolína Kurková	Mark Abrahams

=== 2002 ===
Issue	Cover model	Photographer
January	Audrey Marnay	Mark Abrahams
February	Mini Andén	Mark Abrahams
March	Erin O'Connor	Mark Abrahams
April	Laetitia Casta	Alix Malka
May	Devon Aoki	Alix Malka
June	Nataša Vojnović	Alix Malka
July	Clara Veiga Gazinelli	Alix Malka
August	Audrey Marnay	Mark Abrahams
September	Luca Gadjus	Alix Malka
October	Missy Rayder	Mark Abrahams
November	Maggie Rizer	Alix Malka
December	Jeísa Chiminazzo	Alix Malka

=== 2003 ===
Issue	Cover model	Photographer
January	Tetyana Brazhnyk	Alix Malka
February	Clara Veiga Gazinelli	Alix Malka
March	Mariacarla Boscono	Hervé Lafond
April	Mini Andén	Jonty Davies
May	Heidi Klum	Raymond Meier
June	Michelle Alves	Jonty Davies
July	Mia Rosing	Ralph Mecke
August	Claudia Schiffer	Mark Abrahams
September	Stella Tennant	Rankin
October	Jodie Kidd	Rankin
November	Monica Bellucci	Unknown
December	Sarah Jessica Parker	Wayne Maser

=== 2004 ===
Issue	Cover model	Photographer
January	Eugenia Volodina	Philippe Cometti
February	Hilary Swank	Mark Abrahams
March	Mariacarla Boscono	Rankin
April	Claudia Schiffer	Rankin
May	Filippa Hamilton	Rankin
June	Naomi Campbell	Mark Abrahams
July	Julia Stegner	Mark Abrahams
August	Penélope Cruz	Patrick Demarchelier
September	Nadja Auermann	Ralph Mecke
October	Angela Lindvall; Anna Jagodzińska; Caroline Trentini; Caroline Winberg; Eugenia Volodina (2 covers); Hana Soukupová (2 covers); Heather Marks (4 covers); Helena Christensen; Jacquetta Wheeler; Julia Stegner; Liliana Domínguez; Luca Gadjus (2 covers); Lydia Hearst (2 covers); Michelle Alves; Missy Rayder; Naomi Campbell; Raquel Zimmermann; Tiiu Kuik	Mark Abrahams
November	Erin Wasson	Mark Abrahams
December	Gisele Bündchen	Patrick Demarchelier

=== 2005 ===
Issue	Cover model	Photographer
January	Jacquetta Wheeler	Patrick Demarchelier
February	Carolyn Murphy	Patrick Demarchelier
March	Cate Blanchett	Mark Abrahams
April	Lydia Hearst	Mark Abrahams
May	Hilary Swank	Mark Abrahams
June	Louise Pedersen	Enrique Badulescu
July	Missy Rayder	Nicolas Moore
August	Caroline Winberg	James Bennett
September	Renée Zellweger	Mark Abrahams
October	Claudia Schiffer	Knoepfel & Indlekofer
October	Linda Evangelista; Natalia Vodianova; Susan Sarandon	Patrick Demarchelier
October	Goldie Hawn	Mark Abrahams
October	Sophia Loren	Sante D'Orazio
November	Natalie Portman	Mark Abrahams
December	Carmen Kass	Maciek Kobielski

=== 2006 ===
Issue	Cover model	Photographer
January	Doutzen Kroes	Mark Abrahams
February	Mariacarla Boscono	Patrick Demarchelier
March	Anna Jagodzińska	Patrick Demarchelier
April	Julia Stegner	Keiron O'Connor
May	Natalia Vodianova	David Bailey
June	Natasha Poly	Mark Abrahams
July	Ingūna Butāne	Mark Abrahams
August	Gisele Bündchen	Patrick Demarchelier
September	Hana Soukupová	Mark Abrahams
October	Alyssa Miller; Darla Baker	Vincent Peters
November	Michaela Hlaváčková	Eric Maillet
December	Doutzen Kroes	Alexi Lubomirski

=== 2007 ===
Issue	Cover model	Photographer
January	Eugenia Volodina	Thomas Schenk
February	Rachel Weisz	Mark Abrahams
March	Małgosia Bela	Vincent Peters
April	Carolyn Murphy; Cindy Crawford; Karolína Kurková; Liya Kebede; Stephanie Seymour	Alexi Lubomirski
May	Milla Jovovich	Javier Vallhonrat
June	Amber Valletta	Vincent Peters
July	Hana Soukupová	Alexi Lubomirski
August	Claudia Schiffer; Nadja Auermann; Julia Stegner	Alexi Lubomirski
September	Angela Lindvall	Alexi Lubomirski
October	Daria Werbowy	Patrick Demarchelier
November	Kim Basinger	Vincent Peters
December	Lisa Cant	Alexi Lubomirski

=== 2008 ===
Issue	Cover model	Photographer
January	Julia Stegner	Alexi Lubomirski
February	Diane Kruger	Vincent Peters
March	Élise Crombez	Alexi Lubomirski
April	Luca Gadjus	Vincent Peters
May	Kylie Minogue	Vincent Peters
June	Claudia Schiffer	Mario Testino
July	Anja Rubik	Alexi Lubomirski
August	Toni Garrn	Knoepfel & Indlekofer
September	Hilary Rhoda	Alexi Lubomirski
October	Magdalena Frackowiak	Alexi Lubomirski
November	Eva Herzigová	Vincent Peters
December	Julia Stegner	Alexi Lubomirski

=== 2009 ===
Issue	Cover model	Photographer
January	Isabeli Fontana	Vincent Peters
February	Masha Novoselova	Alexi Lubomirski
March	Toni Garrn	Greg Kadel
April	Doutzen Kroes	Alexi Lubomirski
May	Arlenis Sosa	Alexi Lubomirski
June	Heidi Klum	Francesco Carrozzini
July	Julia Stegner	Alexi Lubomirski
August	Edita Vilkevičiūtė	Greg Kadel
September	Anja Rubik	Alexi Lubomirski
October	30th Anniversary Issue (no model cover)	Bruce Weber; Karl Lagerfeld; Peter Lindbergh
November	Katrin Thormann	Sølve Sundsbø
December	Karolin Wolter & Luca Gadjus	Alexi Lubomirski

== 2010s ==
=== 2010 ===
Issue	Cover model	Photographer
January	Toni Garrn	Camilla Åkrans
February	Eva Mendes	Greg Kadel
March	Frida Gustavsson	Greg Kadel
April	Diane Kruger	Karl Lagerfeld
May	Victoria Beckham	Alexi Lubomirski
June	Claudia Schiffer	Karl Lagerfeld
July	Cameron Russell	Greg Kadel
August	Abbey Lee Kershaw	Alexi Lubomirski
September	Constance Jablonski	Alexi Lubomirski
October	Anja Rubik	Camilla Åkrans
November	Ieva Lagūna	Greg Kadel
December	Edita Vilkevičiūtė	Alexi Lubomirski

=== 2011 ===
Issue	Cover model	Photographer
January	Maryna Linchuk	Greg Kadel
February	Bianca Balti	Victor Demarchelier
February	Milla Jovovich	Francesco Carrozzini
March	Constance Jablonski	Alexi Lubomirski
April	Britt Maren	Knoepfel & Indlekofer
May	Julia Stegner	Alexi Lubomirski
June	Alessandra Ambrosio & Jamie Mazur; Anja Rubik & Sasha Knezevic; Karolína Kurková & Archie Drury	Alexi Lubomirski
July	Natalia Vodianova	Knoepfel & Indlekofer
August	Claudia Schiffer	Miles Aldridge
September	Iris Strubegger	Alexi Lubomirski
October	Doutzen Kroes	Camilla Åkrans
November	Rosie Huntington-Whiteley	Alexi Lubomirski
December	Karlie Kloss	Alexi Lubomirski

=== 2012 ===
Issue	Cover model	Photographer
January	Carola Remer	Greg Kadel
February	Michelle Williams	Brigitte Lacombe
March	Lais Ribeiro	Alexi Lubomirski
April	Iris Strubegger	Peter Lindbergh
May	Guinevere Van Seenus	Knoepfel & Indlekofer
June	Carolyn Murphy	Alexi Lubomirski
July	Kendra Spears	Knoepfel & Indlekofer
August	Toni Garrn	Alexi Lubomirski
September	Salma Hayek	Alexi Lubomirski
October	Kati Nescher	Camilla Åkrans
November	Saskia de Brauw	Daniel Jackson
December	Toni Garrn	Alexi Lubomirski

=== 2013 ===
Issue	Cover model	Photographer
January	Jessica Chastain	Bruce Weber
February	Constance Jablonski	Alexi Lubomirski
March	Doutzen Kroes	Daniel Jackson
March	Kati Nescher	Daniel Jackson
March	Saskia de Brauw	Daniel Jackson
April	Tina Turner	Knoepfel & Indlekofer
May	Kati Nescher	Daniele & Iango
June	Karmen Pedaru	Alexi Lubomirski
July	Linda Evangelista	Karl Lagerfeld
August	Nicole Kidman	Camilla Åkrans
September	Anja Rubik	Knoepfel & Indlekofer
October	Vanessa Axente	Daniele & Iango
November	Edie Campbell	Daniel Jackson
December	Julia Stegner	Giampaolo Sgura

=== 2014 ===
Issue	Cover model	Photographer
January	Joan Smalls	Luigi + Daniele & Iango
February	Suvi Koponen	Knoepfel & Indlekofer
March	Miley Cyrus	Mario Testino
April	Claudia Schiffer	Luigi & Iango
May	Małgosia Bela	Giampaolo Sgura
June	Rosie Huntington-Whiteley	Camilla Åkrans
July	Diane Kruger	Camilla Åkrans
August	Anja Rubik	Camilla Åkrans
September	Vanessa Axente	Daniel Jackson
October	Natasha Poly	Luigi & Iango
November	Nadja Auermann	Luigi & Iango
December	Kati Nescher	Giampaolo Sgura

=== 2015 ===
Issue	Cover model	Photographer
January	Andreea Diaconu	Giampaolo Sgura
January	Hilary Rhoda	Giampaolo Sgura
January	Karmen Pedaru	Giampaolo Sgura
February	Vanessa Moody	Camilla Åkrans
March	Anna Ewers	Camilla Åkrans; Daniel Jackson; Luigi & Iango; Patrick Demarchelier; Peter Lindbergh
April	Aymeline Valade	Giampaolo Sgura
May	Edie & Olympia Campbell	Karl Lagerfeld
June	Alisa Ahmann	Giampaolo Sgura
July	Toni Garrn	Giampaolo Sgura
August	Constance Jablonski	Giampaolo Sgura
August	Edita Vilkevičiūtė	Giampaolo Sgura
August	Mica Argañaraz	Giampaolo Sgura
September	Julia Bergshoeff	Patrick Demarchelier
October	Julia Nobis	Luigi & Iango
November	Victoria Beckham	Boo George
December	Liya Kebede	Giampaolo Sgura

=== 2016 ===
Issue	Cover model	Photographer
January	Vanessa Moody	Giampaolo Sgura
February	Daria Strokous	Giampaolo Sgura
February	Maartje Verhoef	Giampaolo Sgura
February	Mariacarla Boscono	Giampaolo Sgura
March	Anna Ewers	Giampaolo Sgura
April	Edie Campbell	Giampaolo Sgura
May	Gigi Hadid	Camilla Åkrans
June	Rianne van Rompaey	Daniel Jackson
July	Edita Vilkevičiūtė	Boo George
August	Emily Ratajkowski	Giampaolo Sgura
August	Irina Shayk	Giampaolo Sgura
August	Lily Aldridge	Giampaolo Sgura
August	Rosie Huntington-Whiteley	Giampaolo Sgura
August	Stella Maxwell	Giampaolo Sgura
September	Frederikke Sofie	Patrick Demarchelier
October	Kendall Jenner	Luigi & Iango
November	Lara Stone	Camilla Åkrans
December	Olympia & Edie Campbell	Boo George

=== 2017 ===
Issue	Cover model	Photographer
January	Cameron Russell	Giampaolo Sgura
February	Toni Garrn	Giampaolo Sgura
March	Lady Jean Campbell	Patrick Demarchelier
April	Madonna	Luigi & Iango
May	Irina Shayk	Peter Lindbergh
May	Kate Moss	Peter Lindbergh
May	Lara Stone	Peter Lindbergh
June	Saskia de Brauw	Daniel Jackson
July	Anna Ewers	Giampaolo Sgura
August	Anna Cleveland	Giampaolo Sgura
August	Birgit Kos	Giampaolo Sgura
August	Yasmin Wijnaldum	Giampaolo Sgura
September	Claudia Schiffer	Giampaolo Sgura
October	Christy Turlington	Daniel Jackson
November	Vittoria Ceretti	Luigi & Iango
December	Diane Kruger	Luigi & Iango

=== 2018 ===
Issue	Cover model	Photographer
January	Gigi Hadid	Patrick Demarchelier
February	Anna Ewers	Daniel Jackson
February	Faretta	Daniel Jackson
February	Grace Elizabeth	Daniel Jackson
February	Raquel Zimmermann	Daniel Jackson
March	Birgit Kos	Giampaolo Sgura
April	Irina Shayk	Daniel Jackson
May	Luna Bijl	Karl Lagerfeld
June	Othilia Simon	Giampaolo Sgura
July	Fran Summers	Luigi & Iango
July	Mayowa Nicholas	Luigi & Iango
July	Vittoria Ceretti	Luigi & Iango
August	Anja Rubik	Daniel Jackson
August	Doutzen Kroes	Daniel Jackson
August	Edie Campbell	Daniel Jackson
August	Naomi Campbell	Daniel Jackson
September	Charlotte Casiraghi	Daniel Jackson
October	Anna Ewers	Giampaolo Sgura
November	Edita Vilkevičiūtė	Alique
December	Anja Rubik	Giampaolo Sgura

=== 2019 ===
Issue	Cover model	Photographer
January	Helene Fischer	Peter Lindbergh
February	Bastian Schweinsteiger & Ana Ivanovic	Alexi Lubomirski
February	Angelique Kerber	Giampaolo Sgura
March	Carolyn Murphy	Camilla Åkrans
March	Isabella Rossellini	Emma Summerton
March	Miuccia Prada	Brigitte Lacombe
April	Gisele Bündchen	Luigi & Iango
May	Erika Linder & Heather Kemesky	Claudia Knoepfel
May	Julia Stegner	Giampaolo Sgura
May	Phyllon Joy Gorré; Doutzen Kroes; Myllena Mae Gorré	Tim Hill & James Aubrey Finnigan
June	Saskia de Brauw	Daniel Jackson
June	Stella Tennant	Daniel Jackson
July	Birgit Kos	Peter Lindbergh
July	Luna Bijl	Peter Lindbergh
July	Vittoria Ceretti	Peter Lindbergh
August	Victoria Beckham	Chris Colls
September	Adut Akech	Chris Colls
September	Rebecca Leigh Longendyke	Chris Colls
October	Diane Kruger	Juergen Teller
November	Gigi Hadid	Giampaolo Sgura
December	Rianne van Rompaey	Collier Schorr

== 2020s ==
=== 2020 ===
Issue	Cover model	Photographer
January	Katharina Grosse	Claudia Knoepfel
February	Anok Yai	Gregory Harris
February	Mica Argañaraz	Gregory Harris
February	Othilia Simon	Gregory Harris
March	Adwoa Aboah	Alique
April	Hailey Bieber	Luigi & Iango
May	Helen Mirren	Liz Collins
May	Iris Berben	Liz Collins
May	Sharon Stone	Liz Collins
June	Toni Garrn & Alex Pettyfer	Giampaolo Sgura
July-August	—	Julia Noni
September	Nicole Atieno	Stefan Heinrichs
October	Maike Inga	Claudia Knoepfel
November	Raquel Zimmermann	Chris Colls
December	Irina Shayk	Luigi & Iango

=== 2021 ===
Issue	Cover model	Photographer
January-February	Heidi Klum, Leni Klum	Chris Colls
March	Akon Changkou	Julia Noni
April	Edie Campbell	Giampaolo Sgura
May-June	Toni Garn	Camilla Åkrans
July-August	Yasmin Wijnaldum	Chris Colls
September	Anna Ewers	Julia Noni
October	Amber Valetta	Sean Thomas
November	Ugbad	Daniel Jackson
December	Kendall Jenner	Dan Martensen

=== 2022 ===
Issue	Cover model	Photographer
January-February	He Cong	Eddie Wrey
March	Anke Engelke	Camilla Ambrust
April	Badmómzjay	Thomas Lohr
May	Grace Elizabeth	Paul Wetherell
June	Stefanie Graf	Stefan Ruiz
July-August	Naomi Campbell	Dan Martensen
September	Jella Haase	Dan Beleiu
October	Renate Reinsve	Gregory Harris
November	Elizabeth Debicki	Scott Trindle
December	Aminata Touré	Delali Ayivi

=== 2023 ===
Issue	Cover model	Photographer
January/February	Florence Kasumba	Joachim Müller-Ruchholtz
March	Nina Hoss	Greg Williams
April	Lea Schüller	Delali Ayivi
May	Selma Blair	Adama Jalloh
June	Paloma Elsesser	Oliver Hadlee Pearch
July/August	Lauren Hutton	Ned Rogers
September	Ashley Graham	Felicity Ingram
October	Ruby O. Fee & Matthias Schweighöfer	Paul Wetherell
November	Kim Petras	Micaiah Carter
December	Greta Hofer	Julia Noni

=== 2024 ===
Issue	Cover model	Photographer
January/February	Peggy Gou	Misha Taylor
March	Claudia Schiffer	Luigi & Iango
April	Adut Akech	Campbell Addy
May	Kate Moss	Nikolai von Bismarck
June	Hunter Schafer	Ethan James Green
July/August	Margot Friedländer	Mark Peckmezian
September	Devyn Garcia	Julia Noni
October	Sandra Hüller	Juergen Teller
November	Karolina Spakowski	Charlotte Wales
December	Heike Makatsch	Noémi Ottilia Szabo
December (Digital)	Gisèle Pelicot	Cecilia Lundgren

=== 2025 ===
Issue	Cover model	Photographer
January/February	Emma Corrin	Samuel Bradley
March	Emilia Schüle	Felicity Ingram
April	Tilda Swinton	Roman Goebel
May	Nadja Auermann	Scott Trindle
June	Mia Armstrong	Noua Unu
July/August	Bill Kaulitz	Frederike Helwig
September	Paloma Elsesser	Julia Noni
October	Chloë Sevigny	Michael Bailey-Gates
November	Dakota Johnson	Gregory Harris
December	Penelope Ternes	Julia Noni

=== 2026 ===
Issue	Cover model	Photographer
January/February	Maty Fall Diba	Felicity Ingram
March	Hannah Herzsprung	Stefan Armbruster
April	Cate Blanchett	Nikolai von Bismarck
May	Simone Ashley	Frederike Helwig
June	Devyn Garcia, Yumi Nu	Felicity Ingram
July/August	Mala Emde	Elizaveta Porodina
September	Karen Mulder	Sean + Seng
October	Vicky Krieps	Gorka Postigo
November	Sunday Rose	Sebastián Faena
December	Lily Collins, Ashley Park	Rasmus Weng Karlsen
