= List of Allure cover models =

Allure is a women's beauty magazine published by Condé Nast Publications. A famous woman, typically an actress, singer, or model, is featured on the cover of each month's issue. Following are the names of each cover subject from the first issue of Allure in March 1991 to the most recent issue.

== Allure ==
=== 1990s ===
==== 1991 ====
Issue	Cover model	Photographer
March	Stephanie Seymour	Sante D'Orazio
April	Elaine Irwin	Sante D'Orazio
May	Stephanie Seymour	Sante D'Orazio
June	Linda Evangelista	Steven Meisel
July	Estelle Lefébure	Sante D'Orazio
August	Linda Evangelista	Patrick Demarchelier
September	Niki Taylor	Sante D'Orazio
October	Tanya Fourie	Sante D'Orazio
November	Isabella Rossellini	Steven Meisel
December	Cindy Crawford	Sante D'Orazio

==== 1992 ====
Issue	Cover model	Photographer
January	Karen Mulder	Sante D'Orazio
February	Shana Zadrick	Sante D'Orazio
March	Claudia Schiffer	Sante D'Orazio
April	Carré Otis	Sante D'Orazio
May	Linda Evangelista	Sante D'Orazio
June	Helena Christensen	Sante D'Orazio
July	Claudia Schiffer	Sante D'Orazio
August	Christy Turlington	Sante D'Orazio
September	Stephanie Seymour	Sante D'Orazio
October	Cindy Crawford	Sante D'Orazio
November	Jenny Brunt	Sante D'Orazio
December	Claudia Schiffer	Sante D'Orazio

==== 1993 ====
Issue	Cover model	Photographer
January	Patricia Hartmann; Kate Moss; Jenny Brunt	Sante D'Orazio
February	Shalom Harlow	Sante D'Orazio
March	Leilani Bishop	Sante D'Orazio
April	Meghan Douglas	Sante D'Orazio
May	Helena Christensen	Sante D'Orazio
June	Shalom Harlow	Sante D'Orazio
July	Naomi Campbell	Sante D'Orazio
August	Linda Evangelista	Sante D'Orazio
September	Amber Valletta	Sante D'Orazio
October	Beri Smither	Sante D'Orazio
November	Bridget Hall	Walter Chin
December	Linda Evangelista	Sante D'Orazio

==== 1994 ====
Issue	Cover model	Photographer
January	Claudia Schiffer	Sante D'Orazio
February	Cindy Crawford	Sante D'Orazio
March	Bridget Hall	Sante D'Orazio
April	Claudia Schiffer	Sante D'Orazio
May	Kate Moss	Sante D'Orazio
June	Tatjana Patitz	Sante D'Orazio
July	Bridget Hall	Sante D'Orazio
August	Niki Taylor	Sante D'Orazio
September	Amber Valletta	Sante D'Orazio
October	Carré Otis	Sante D'Orazio
November	Claudia Schiffer	Sante D'Orazio
December	Kate Moss	Mario Testino

==== 1995 ====
Issue	Cover model	Photographer
January	Cindy Crawford	Sante D'Orazio
February	Amber Valletta	Mario Testino
March	Bridget Hall	Sante D'Orazio
April	Linda Evangelista	Sante D'Orazio
May	Carré Otis	Sante D'Orazio
June	Kate Moss	Sante D'Orazio
July	Claudia Schiffer	Sante D'Orazio
August	Niki Taylor	Mario Testino
September	Kate Moss	Mario Testino
October	Bridget Hall	Sante D'Orazio
November	Cindy Crawford	Sante D'Orazio
December	Kirsty Hume	Miles Aldridge

==== 1996 ====
Issue	Cover model	Photographer
January	Shalom Harlow	Miles Aldridge
February	Claudia Schiffer	Miles Aldridge
March	Niki Taylor	Sante D'Orazio
April	Helena Christensen	Sante D'Orazio
May	Niki Taylor	Sante D'Orazio
June	Kirsty Hume	Miles Aldridge
July	Kate Moss	Mario Testino
August	Bridget Hall	Sante D'Orazio
September	Cindy Crawford	Michel Comte
October	Niki Taylor	Mario Testino
November	Helena Christensen	Sante D'Orazio
December	Sharon Stone	Herb Ritts

==== 1997 ====
Issue	Cover model	Photographer
January	Linda Evangelista	Sante D'Orazio
February	Niki Taylor	Sante D'Orazio
March	Elisabeth Shue	Herb Ritts
April	Kate Moss	Drew Jarrett
May	Cindy Crawford	Dewey Nicks
June	Niki Taylor	Dewey Nicks
July	Claudia Schiffer	Dewey Nicks
August	Georgina Grenville	Sante D'Orazio
September	Bridget Hall	Sante D'Orazio
October	Niki Taylor	Michel Comte
November	Cindy Crawford	Michel Comte
December	Kirsty Hume	Mario Testino

==== 1998 ====
Issue	Cover model	Photographer
January	Helen Hunt	Herb Ritts
February	Carolyn Murphy	Sante D'Orazio
March	Jennifer Aniston	Sante D'Orazio
April	Niki Taylor	Sante D'Orazio
May	Gisele Bündchen; Aurélie Claudel	Mario Testino
June	Cindy Crawford	Sante D'Orazio
July	Eva Herzigová	Walter Chin
August	Stephanie Seymour	Walter Chin
September	Rebecca Romijn	Walter Chin
October	Claudia Schiffer	Walter Chin
November	Geri Halliwell	Michel Comte
December	Gisele Bündchen	Mario Testino

==== 1999 ====
Issue	Cover model	Photographer
January	Courtney Love	Regan Cameron
February	Aurélie Claudel	Mario Testino
March	Angelina Jolie	Robert Erdmann
April	Julianne Moore	Regan Cameron
May	Reese Witherspoon	Regan Cameron
June	Amber Valletta	Robert Erdmann
July	Catherine Zeta-Jones	Pamela Hanson
August	Sharon Stone	Robert Erdmann
September	Julianna Margulies	Robert Erdmann
October	Kate Moss	Rankin
November	Patricia Arquette	Mario Testino
December	Renée Zellweger	Rankin

=== 2000s ===
==== 2000 ====
Issue	Cover model	Photographer
January	Winona Ryder	Regan Cameron
February	Gisele Bündchen	Michael Thompson
March	Charlize Theron	Walter Chin
April	Sandra Bullock	Michael Thompson
May	Heather Graham	Michael Thompson
June	Britney Spears	Michael Thompson
July	Sarah Jessica Parker	Michael Thompson
August	Michelle Pfeiffer	Michael Thompson
September	Heather Locklear	Michael Thompson
October	Kim Basinger	Michael Thompson
November	Lucy Liu	Michael Thompson
December	Gisele Bündchen	Michael Thompson

==== 2001 ====
Issue	Cover model	Photographer
January	Jennifer Lopez	Michael Thompson
February	Catherine Zeta-Jones	Michael Thompson
March	Angelina Jolie	Michael Thompson
April	Angie Harmon	Michael Thompson
May	Amber Valletta	Michael Thompson
June	Sarah Michelle Gellar	Regan Cameron
July	Erin Wasson	Mario Testino
August	Lara Flynn Boyle	Regan Cameron
September	Mariah Carey	Michael Thompson
October	Amber Valletta	Michael Thompson
November	Calista Flockhart	Michael Thompson
December	Carolyn Murphy	Michael Thompson

==== 2002 ====
Issue	Cover model	Photographer
January	Liv Tyler	Michael Thompson
February	Niki Taylor	Michael Thompson
March	Drew Barrymore	Michael Thompson
April	Jessica Alba	Michael Thompson
May	Christina Aguilera	Michael Thompson
June	Natalie Portman	Michael Thompson
July	Amber Valletta	Michael Thompson
August	Beyoncé	Michael Thompson
September	Jennifer Garner	Michael Thompson
October	Debra Messing	Michael Thompson
November	Lisa Kudrow	Michael Thompson
December	Renée Zellweger	Michael Thompson

==== 2003 ====
Issue	Cover model	Photographer
January	Mariah Carey	Michael Thompson
February	Faith Hill	Michael Thompson
March	Meg Ryan	Michael Thompson
April	Molly Sims	Michael Thompson
May	Gwen Stefani	Michael Thompson
June	Katie Holmes	Michael Thompson
July	Eve	Michael Thompson
August	Naomi Watts	Michael Thompson
September	Gwyneth Paltrow	Michael Thompson
October	Penélope Cruz	Michael Thompson
November	Catherine Zeta-Jones	Michael Thompson
December	Jennifer Connelly	Michael Thompson

==== 2004 ====
Issue	Cover model	Photographer
January	Christina Aguilera	Michael Thompson
February	Jennifer Aniston	Michael Thompson
March	Debra Messing	Michael Thompson
April	Jessica Simpson	Michael Thompson
May	Mary-Kate & Ashley Olsen	Michael Thompson
June	Kelly Ripa	Michael Thompson
July	Kate Hudson	Michael Thompson
August	Natalie Portman	Michael Thompson
September	Kirsten Dunst	Michael Thompson
October	Sarah Michelle Gellar	Michael Thompson
November	Angelina Jolie	Mario Testino
December	Claire Danes	Michael Thompson

==== 2005 ====
Issue	Cover model	Photographer
January	Ashlee Simpson	Michael Thompson
February	Mischa Barton	Michael Thompson
March	Ashley Judd	Patrick Demarchelier
April	Britney Spears	Michael Thompson
May	Penélope Cruz	Michael Thompson
June	Ellen DeGeneres	Michael Thompson
July	Hilary Swank	Michael Thompson
August	Scarlett Johansson	Michael Thompson
September	Mariah Carey	Michael Thompson
October	Gwen Stefani	Michael Thompson
November	Rachel McAdams	Michael Thompson
December	Teri Hatcher	Michael Thompson

==== 2006 ====
Issue	Cover model	Photographer
January	Gwyneth Paltrow	Michael Thompson
February	Sheryl Crow	Michael Thompson
March	Lindsay Lohan	Michael Thompson
April	Eva Longoria	Michael Thompson
May	Meg Ryan	Michael Thompson
June	Audrey Tautou	Mario Testino
July	Kate Beckinsale	Michael Thompson
August	Kate Hudson	Michael Thompson
September	Christina Aguilera	Michael Thompson
October	Jessica Simpson	Michael Thompson
November	Scarlett Johansson	Michael Thompson
December	Ellen Pompeo	Michael Thompson

==== 2007 ====
Issue	Cover model	Photographer
January	Naomi Watts	Michael Thompson
February	Julianne Moore	Michael Thompson
March	Michelle Pfeiffer	Michael Thompson
April	Jennifer Garner	Michael Thompson
May	Lindsay Lohan	Mario Testino
June	Katherine Heigl	Michael Thompson
July	Liv Tyler	Michael Thompson
August	Catherine Zeta-Jones	Michael Thompson
September	Britney Spears	Michael Thompson
October	Keira Knightley	Michael Thompson
November	Jennifer Lopez	Michael Thompson
December	Fergie	Michael Thompson

==== 2008 ====
Issue	Cover model	Photographer
January	Rihanna	Michael Thompson
February	Sarah Jessica Parker	Tom Munro
March	Kate Beckinsale	Michael Thompson
April	Mariah Carey	Michael Thompson
May	Hilary Duff	Michael Thompson
June	Jessica Alba	Michael Thompson
July	Ali Larter	Michael Thompson
August	Victoria Beckham	Michael Thompson
September	Carrie Underwood	Michael Thompson
October	Ellen Pompeo	Michael Thompson
November	Eva Longoria	Norman Jean Roy
December	Scarlett Johansson	Tom Munro

==== 2009 ====
Issue	Cover model	Photographer
January	Eva Mendes	Michael Thompson
February	Isla Fisher	Norman Jean Roy
March	Julia Roberts	Michael Thompson
April	Taylor Swift	Michael Thompson
May	Blake Lively	Michael Thompson
June	Jessica Biel	Michael Thompson
July	Fergie	Michael Thompson
August	Amy Adams	Michael Thompson
September	Amanda Seyfried	Norman Jean Roy
October	Vanessa Hudgens	Carter Smith
November	Kristen Stewart	Michael Thompson
December	Kirsten Dunst	Carter Smith

=== 2010s ===
==== 2010 ====
Issue	Cover model	Photographer
January	Jennifer Lopez	Michael Thompson
February	Beyoncé	Michael Thompson
March	Jessica Simpson	Norman Jean Roy
April	Carrie Underwood	Carter Smith
May	Catherine Zeta-Jones	Michael Thompson
June	Megan Fox	Greg Kadel
July	Diane Kruger	Michael Thompson
August	Eva Mendes	Michael Thompson
September	Kim Kardashian	Michael Thompson
October	Blake Lively	Norman Jean Roy
November	Julianne Moore	Tom Munro
December	Taylor Swift	Michael Thompson

==== 2011 ====
Issue	Cover model	Photographer
January	Leighton Meester	Michael Thompson
February	Jennifer Aniston	Michael Thompson
March	Victoria Beckham	Michael Thompson
April	Eva Longoria	Norman Jean Roy
May	Lauren Conrad	Carter Smith
June	January Jones	Norman Jean Roy
July	Fergie	Norman Jean Roy
August	Jessica Alba	Michael Thompson
September	Salma Hayek	Mario Testino
October	Olivia Wilde	Carter Smith
November	Ashley Greene	Michael Thompson
December	Lea Michele	Norman Jean Roy

==== 2012 ====
Issue	Cover model	Photographer
January	Rooney Mara	Michael Thompson
February	Zooey Deschanel	Norman Jean Roy
March	Kim Kardashian	Norman Jean Roy
April	Nicki Minaj	Michael Thompson
May	Heidi Klum	Norman Jean Roy
June	Elizabeth Banks	Norman Jean Roy
July	Anne Hathaway	Tom Munro
August	Kate Beckinsale	Norman Jean Roy
September	Sofía Vergara	Carter Smith
October	Blake Lively	Carter Smith
November	Lauren Conrad	Alexi Lubomirski
December	Keira Knightley	Mario Testino

==== 2013 ====
Issue	Cover model	Photographer
January	Drew Barrymore	Carter Smith
February	Carrie Underwood	Alexi Lubomirski
March	Mila Kunis	Tom Munro
April	Katie Holmes	Tom Munro
May	Amanda Seyfried	Patrick Demarchelier
June	Zoe Saldaña	Tom Munro
July	Amy Adams	Norman Jean Roy
August	Kate Moss	Mario Testino
September	Jennifer Garner	Alexi Lubomirski
October	Olivia Wilde	Norman Jean Roy
November	Naomi Watts	Carter Smith
December	Mary-Kate & Ashley Olsen	Peter Lindbergh

==== 2014 ====
Issue	Cover model	Photographer
January	Penélope Cruz	Mario Testino
February	Jennifer Connelly	Carter Smith
March	Victoria Beckham	Alexi Lubomirski
April	Lauren Conrad	Alexi Lubomirski
May	Olivia Munn	Carter Smith
June	Amber Valletta	Tom Munro
July	Taylor Schilling	Carter Smith
August	Rachel McAdams	Carter Smith
September	Chloë Grace Moretz	Carter Smith
October	Cara Delevingne	Mario Testino
November	Kerry Washington	Carter Smith
December	Allison Williams	Carter Smith

==== 2015 ====
Issue	Cover model	Photographer
January	Jennifer Aniston	Michael Thompson
February	Fergie	Patrick Demarchelier
March	Kendall Jenner	Mario Testino
April	Julianne Hough	Carter Smith
May	Blake Lively	Mario Testino
June	Elizabeth Banks	Norman Jean Roy
July	Taraji P. Henson	Carter Smith
August	Salma Hayek	Patrick Demarchelier
September	Jessica Alba	Carter Smith
October	Julia Roberts	Tom Munro
November	Kate Hudson	Tom Munro
December	Claire Danes	Sebastian Kim

==== 2016 ====
Issue	Cover model	Photographer
January	Emma Roberts	Patrick Demarchelier
February	Demi Lovato	Alexi Lubomirski
March	Bella Hadid; Naomi Campbell	Patrick Demarchelier
April	Amy Adams	Carter Smith
May	FKA Twigs	Alasdair McLellan
June	Elizabeth Olsen	Tom Craig
July	Zoe Saldaña	Patrick Demarchelier
August	Kylie Jenner	Scott Trindle
September	Jessica Alba	Will Davidson
October	Kendall Jenner	Patrick Demarchelier
November	Amanda Seyfried	Scott Trindle
December	Gigi Hadid	Patrick Demarchelier

==== 2017 ====
Issue	Cover model	Photographer
January	Zendaya	Jason Kibbler
February	Alicia Keys	Paola Kudacki
March	Allison Williams	Jason Kibbler
April	Dilone; Imaan Hammam; Aamito Lagum	Patrick Demarchelier
May	Sienna Miller	Daniel Jackson
June	Zoë Kravitz	Patrick Demarchelier
July	Halima Aden	Sølve Sundsbø
August	Emily Ratajkowski	Daniel Jackson
September	Helen Mirren	Scott Trindle
October	Kim Kardashian	Daniel Jackson
November	Kerry Washington	Sharif Hamza
December	Amber Heard	Daniel Jackson

==== 2018 ====
Issue	Cover model	Photographer
January	Edie Campbell	Daniel Jackson
February	Dakota Johnson	Petra Collins
March	Lupita Nyong'o	Patrick Demarchelier
April	Adwoa Aboah	Daniel Jackson
May	Sasha Lane	Scott Trindle
June	Fei Fei Sun; Fernanda Ly; Soo Joo Park	Sølve Sundsbø
July	Janelle Monáe	Camila Falquez
August	Lily James	Sharif Hamza
September	Bella Hadid	Daniel Jackson
October	Rihanna	Nadine Ijewere
November	Angela Bassett	Sharif Hamza
December/January	Nicole Kidman	Vicki King

==== 2019 ====
Issue	Cover model	Photographer
February	Serena Williams	Tanya & Zhenya Posternak
March	Kendall Jenner	Cass Bird
April	Gemma Chan	Paola Kudacki
May	Adut Akech	Daniel Jackson
June	Emilia Clarke	Marcus Ohlsson
July	Ashley Graham	Vanina Sorrenti
August	Naomi Osaka	Wai Lin Tse
September	Anne Hathaway	Sølve Sundsbø
October	Lady Gaga	Daniel Jackson
November	Sharon Stone	Emma Summerton
December/January	Zendaya	Miguel Reveriego

=== 2020s ===
==== 2020 ====
Issue	Cover model	Photographer
February	Billy Porter	Ben Hassett
March	Lili Reinhart	Marcus Ohlsson
April	Dixie Chicks	Liz Collins
May	Jihyo	Ahn Jooyoung
June/July	Emma Chamberlain	Lindsay Ellary
August	Ashlyn Harris; Ali Krieger	Norman Jean Roy
September	Hunter Schafer	Daniella Midenge
October	Selena Gomez	Micaiah Carter
November	Kesewa Aboah	Ruth Ossai
December/January	Pharrell Williams	Ben Hassett

==== 2021 ====
Issue	Cover model	Photographer
February	Pat McGrath	Richard Burbridge
March	Jennifer Lopez	Daniella Midenge
April	Alicia Keys	Daria Kobayashi Ritch
May	Lee Chae-rin (CL)	Peter Ash Lee
August	Halsey	Jackie Nickerson
September	Normani	Adrienne Raquel
October	Ariana Grande	Zoey Grossman
November	Bad Bunny	Camila Falquez
December/January	Barbie Ferreira	Jennifer Livingston

==== 2022 ====
Issue	Cover model	Photographer
February	Janet Jackson	Tom Munro
March	Amanda Gorman	Djeneba Aduayom
April	Deepika Padukone	Rid Burman
May	Hailey Bieber	Zoey Grossman
June/July	Chloe Bailey	Micaiah Carter
August	Kim Kardashian	Danielle Levitt
September	Millie Bobby Brown	Jem Mitchell
October	Quannah Chasinghorse	Cass Bird
November	Ciara	Peter Ash Lee
December	Jennifer Aniston	Zoey Grossmann

==== 2023 ====
Issue	Cover model	Photographer
February	Chloë Sevigny	Andrew Vowles
April	Rina Sawayama	Johnson Lui
May	Jennifer Garner	Tom Schirmacher
June	Lindsay Lohan	Ben Hassett
August	Doechii	Micaiah Carter
Best of Beauty (September)	Billie Eilish	Cho Gi-Seok
December	Victoria Beckham	

==== 2024 ====
Issue	Cover model	Photographer
March	Saweetie	Dan Beleiu
April	Shakira	Emmanuel Sanchez Monsalve
May	Willow Smith	Zhong Lin
July	Maluma	William Arcand
Best of Beauty (September)	Alia Bhatt	Scandebergs

==== 2025 ====
Issue	Cover model	Photographer
Next (January)	Madison Bailey	Arkan Zakharov
March	Rachel Zegler	Diego Bendezu
May	Nicole Kidman	Dan Beleiu
July	Madelyn Cline	Emmanuel Sanchez Monsalve
August	Julia Fox	Mike Marasco
Best of Beauty (September)	Selena Gomez	Adrienne Raquel
October	Anok Yai, Alex Consani	Zhong Lin

==== 2026 ====
Issue	Cover model	Photographer
February	Dove Cameron	Erika Long
March	Cardi B	Diego Bendezu
June	Yoonchae Jeung, Lara Raj, Megan Skiendiel, Sophia Laforteza, Daniela Avanzini	Charlotte Rutherford
September	Amelia Gray, Gabbriette	Bethany Vargas
Best of Beauty (25 September)	Zara Larsson	Hugo Comte
November	Teyana Taylor	Philip-Daniel Ducasse

== Allure Russia ==
Russian edition of Allure magazine was published from September 2012 to December 2016.

=== 2012 ===
Issue	Cover model	Photographer
September	Natasha Poly	Regan Cameron
October	Maryna Linchuk	Guy Aroch
November	Alessandra Ambrosio	Catherine Servel
December	Edita Vilkevičiūtė	Raymond Meier

=== 2013 ===
Issue	Cover model	Photographer
January	Vlada Roslyakova	Alique
February	Crystal Renn	Raymond Meier
March	Anne Vyalitsyna	Norman Jean Roy
April	Daria Popova	Walter Chin
May	Renata Litvinova	Danil Golovkin
June	Kendra Spears	Giampaolo Sgura
July	Katie Holmes	Tom Munro
August	Enikő Mihalik	Walter Chin
September	Irina Shayk	Giampaolo Sgura
October	Lisa Cant	Chris Craymer
November	Toni Garrn	Paola Kudacki
December	Ginta Lapiņa	Norman Jean Roy

=== 2014 ===
Issue	Cover model	Photographer
January	Kati Nescher	Tom Munro
February	Maryna Linchuk	Nicolas Moore
March	Sigrid Agren	Tom Munro
April	Kasia Struss	Giampaolo Sgura
May	Alyssa Miller	Kenneth Willardt
June	Karolína Kurková	Nicolas Moore
July	Doutzen Kroes	Duy Vo
August	Enikő Mihalik	Jem Mitchell
September	Anna Selezneva	Giampaolo Sgura
October	Lily Aldridge	Nicolas Moore
November	Maryna Linchuk	Nicolas Moore
December	Lindsey Wixson	Mario Testino

=== 2015 ===
Issue	Cover model	Photographer
January	Larissa Hofmann	Steven Pan
February	Snejana Onopka	Walter Chin
March	Kate Bogucharskaia	Jason Kim
April	Elisabeth Erm	Michelangelo Di Battista
May	Kori Richardson	Kenneth Willardt
June	Angela Lindvall	Kenneth Willardt
July/August	Anja Rubik	Marcin Tyszka
September	Anastasia Kolganova	Michelangelo Di Battista
October	Fanny François	Dusan Reljin
November	Julia Frauche	Alexi Lubomirski
December/January	Natalia Vodianova	Liz Collins

=== 2016 ===
Issue	Cover model	Photographer
February	Devon Windsor	Dean Isidro
March	Emily DiDonato	Guy Aroch
April	Kate Grigorieva	Danil Golovkin
May	Vika Falileeva	Olaf Wipperfürth
June	Barbara Palvin	Marcin Tyszka
July/August	Elena Perminova	Marcin Tyszka
September	Dasha Gold	Nicolas Moore
October	Vera Brezhneva	Danil Golovkin
November	Elena Perminova	Kenneth Willardt
December/January	Esther Heesch	Sebastian Kim
