= List of Harper's Bazaar Germany cover models =

This list of Harper's Bazaar Germany cover models (1963–1970; 1985–1992; 2014–present) is a catalog of cover models who have appeared on the cover of Harper's Bazaar Germany, the German edition of American fashion magazine Harper's Bazaar.

== 1960s ==
=== 1965 ===
Issue	Cover model	Photographer
September		

=== 1966 ===
Issue	Cover model	Photographer
	Donyale Luna	Bill King

=== 1967 ===
Issue	Cover model	Photographer
January		
June		

== 1980s ==
=== 1985 ===
Issue	Cover model	Photographer
November	Brooke Shields	
December/January	Rosemary McGrotha	

=== 1986 ===
Issue	Cover model	Photographer
February	Jeanette Hallen	
March		
April		
May		
June/July		
August	'Susanna' or 'Suzanne'	
September	Renee Simonsen	
October	Yasmin Le Bon	
November	Brigitte Nielsen	
December/January		

=== 1987 ===
Issue	Cover model	Photographer
February		
March	Isabella Rossellini	
April		
May		
June/July		
August	Talisa Soto	
September		
October	Renee Simonsen	
November		
December/January	Lisa Bonet	

=== 1988 ===
Issue	Cover model	Photographer
February	Claude Heidemeyer	
March		
April	Talisa Soto	
May	Elaine Irwin	Eamonn J. McCabe
June/July	Julie Anderson	
August	Stephanie Seymour	Sante D'Orazio
September	Angie Hill and Stacey Lowe	
October		
November	Estelle Lefebure	
December/January	Donna Stia	

=== 1989 ===
Issue	Cover model	Photographer
February	Therese Bachy	
March	Gail O’Neill	
April	Tatjana Patitz	
May		
June/July		
August		
September	Priscilla	Nadir
October		
November	Jasmine Kenter	
December/January	Ruve Watts	

== 1990s ==
=== 1990 ===
Issue	Cover model	Photographer
February		
March		
April	Rachel Boss	
May	Lucie de la Falaise	
June/July	Monica Bellucci	
August		
September	Michaela Bercu	
October	Isabella Rossellini	
November		
December/January	Tove Johansson	Andre Rau

=== 1991 ===
Issue	Cover model	Photographer
February	Cristina Cascardo	Bruno Bisang
March	Rachel	
April	Naomi Campbell	Michel Haddi
May		
June	Judit Masco	Andre Rau
Jul	Ilonka Toppenberg	
August	Vera Cox	Andre Rau
September		
October		
November	Michaela Bock	
December/January	Daniela Pestova	

=== 1992 ===
Issue	Cover model	Photographer
February		
March	Gretha Cavazzoni	Hiromasa
April		
May		
June/July	Christy Turlington	
August	Tyra Banks	
September	Eva Herzigova	
October		
November		
December/January		

== 2010s ==
=== 2014 ===
Issue	Cover model	Photographer
February	Stacy Martin	Terry Tsiolis
March	Iris Strubegger	Kacper Kasprzyk
April	Hilary Rhoda	Daniel Jackson
May	Ashleigh Good	Johnny Dufort
June/July	Kate Moss	Terry Richardson
August	Lorde	Joachim Muller
September	Mariacarla Boscono	Sebastian Faena
October	Lara Stone	Kacper Kasprzyk
November	Taylor Swift	Paola Kudacki
December/January	Naomi Watts	Max Farago

=== 2015 ===
Issue	Cover model	Photographer
February	Małgosia Bela	Sofia Sanchez & Mauro Mongiello
March	Rosie Huntington-Whiteley	Anthony Maule
April	Amanda Wellsh	Nagi Sakai
May	Arizona Muse	Kacper Kasprzyk
June/July	Anna Selezneva	Marcus Ohlsson
August	Daria Strokous	Terry Tsiolis
September	Katy Perry	Jean-Paul Goude
October	Taylor Hill	Terry Tsiolis
November	Michelle Dockery	David Slijper
December/January	Sam Rollinson	Marcus Ohlsson

=== 2016 ===
Issue	Cover model	Photographer
February	Cayley King	Terry Tsiolis
March	Mathilde Brandi	Terry Tsiolis
April	Julie Delpy	Regan Cameron
May	Valery Kaufman	Marcus Ohlsson
June/July	Larissa Hofmann	Marcus Ohlsson
August	Winona Ryder	Sofia Sanchez & Mauro Mongiello
September	Kanye West & Kim Kardashian	Karl Lagerfeld
October	Alisa Ahmann	Terry Tsiolis
November	Joan Smalls	Marcus Ohlsson
December/January	Anja Rubik	Terry Tsiolis

=== 2017 ===
Issue	Cover model	Photographer
February	Jennifer Lawrence	Ben Hassett
March	Arizona Muse	Marcin Tyszka
April	Larissa Hofmann; Veronika Heilbrunner	Sofia Sanchez & Mauro Mongiello
April	Nina Hoss	Regan Cameron
May	Ana Ivanovic	Marcin Tyszka
June/July	Martha Hunt	Regan Cameron
August	Sam Rollinson	Marcin Tyszka
September	Candice Swanepoel; The Weeknd; Joan Smalls	Brigitte Lacombe
October	Kristen Stewart	Tom Craig
November	Stella Maxwell	Regan Cameron
December/January	Elsa Hosk	Regan Cameron

=== 2018 ===
Issue	Cover model	Photographer
February	Heidi Klum	Regan Cameron
March	Sarah Brannon	Regan Cameron
April	Julia van Os	Marcin Tyszka
May	Elle Fanning	Sofia Sanchez & Mauro Mongiello
June/July	Toni Dreher-Adenuga	Regan Cameron
August	Nimue Smit	Marcin Tyszka
September	Christina Aguilera	Mario Sorrenti
October	Kristin Scott Thomas	Regan Cameron
November	Lina Berg	Regan Cameron
December/January	Alexandra Agoston	Regan Cameron

=== 2019 ===
Issue	Cover model	Photographer
February	Sarah Brannon	Marcin Tyszka
March	Catherine McNeil	Marcin Tyszka
April	Kirsty Hume	Regan Cameron
May	Ine Neefs	Regan Cameron
June/July	Simone Hartseil	Regan Cameron
August	Sasha Luss	Regan Cameron
September	Kate Moss	Mario Sorrenti
October	Michelle Williams	Sofia Sanchez & Mauro Mongiello
November	Cindy Crawford	Regan Cameron
December/January	Klara Kristin	Marcin Tyszka

== 2020s ==
=== 2020 ===
Issue	Cover model	Photographer
February	Alexandra Micu	Marcin Tyszka
March	Elisa Sednaoui	Regan Cameron
April	Charlee Fraser	Sofia Sanchez & Mauro Mongiello
May	Julia van Os	Regan Cameron
June/July	Jacqueline Wruck	Regan Cameron
August	Charlize Theron	Marc-Antoine Coulon
September	Rihanna	Gray Sorrenti
October	Madeleine Fischer	Marcin Tyszka
November	Valerija Kelava	Sofia Sanchez & Mauro Mongiello
December/January	Sarah Saxinger	Sofia Sanchez & Mauro Mongiello

=== 2021 ===
Issue	Cover model	Photographer
February	Magali Delion	Haris Farsarakis
March	Clara Hebbeker	Marcin Tyszka
April	Berit Heitmann	Sofia Sanchez & Mauro Mongiello
May	Lina Bærg	
June/July	Alex-Mariah Peter	
August	Vicky Krieps	
September	Beyoncé	Campbell Addy
October		
November		
December		

=== 2022 ===
Issue	Cover model	Photographer
January	Jennifer Lawrence	
February	Amanda Murphy	Regan Cameron
March		
April	Heidi Klum	Sofia Sanchez & Mauro Mongiello
April	Leni Klum	
May	Alexandra Spanidou, Maria Spanidou	Stefan Armbruster
June/July		
August	Ansley Gulielmi	Sofia Sanchez & Mauro Mongiello
August	Annely Bouma	Robert Rieger
September	Hailey Bieber	
October	Sean Levy	Regan Cameron
November	Florence Kasumba	Sofia Sanchez & Mauro Mongiello
December		

=== 2023 ===
Issue	Cover model	Photographer
January	Lily Collins	
February		
March		
April	Madison Headrick	Regan Cameron
May/June	Celeste Romero	Sofia Sanchez & Mauro Mongiello
May/June	Julia Hafstrom	Marcin Tyszka
July	Vivien	
August	Yilan Hua	Regan Cameron
September	Kendall Jenner	
October	Zoe Saldana	
November	Lucy Boynton	Sofia Sanchez & Mauro Mongiello
December	Michelle Laff	Dima Hohlov

=== 2024 ===
Issue	Cover model	Photographer
January	Kelly Wearstler	Myrthe Giesbers
February	Sophie Turner	Sofia Sanchez & Mauro Mongiello
March	Daria Koshkina	Regan Cameron
April	Stella Maxwell	Regan Cameron
April	Katie Johnson	Sofia Sanchez & Mauro Mongiello
May/June	Julia van Os	Sofia Sanchez & Mauro Mongiello
July	Lea Oude	Sofia Sanchez & Mauro Mongiello
July	Jermaine Kokoú Kothé	Sofia Sanchez & Mauro Mongiello
August	Hilary Rhoda	Sofia Sanchez & Mauro Mongiello
September	Leanne De Haan	Dima Hohlov
October	Roos Abels	Dima Hohlov
November	Africa Garcia	Sofia Sanchez & Mauro Mongiello
December	Estelle Nehring	Dima Hohlov

=== 2025 ===
Issue	Cover model	Photographer
January	Natalia Bulycheva	Regan Cameron
February	Julia Garner	Regan Cameron
March	Lainey Hearn	Regan Cameron
April	Rihanna	Luis Alberto Rodriguez
May/June	Jennie	Sofia Sanchez & Mauro Mongiello
May/June	Heidi Klum	Dima Hohlov
July	Daniela Djokic	Sofia Sanchez & Mauro Mongiello
July	Moritz Rüdiger	Sofia Sanchez & Mauro Mongiello
August	Lineisy Montero	Regan Cameron
August	Greta Helene	Haris Farsarakis
September	Kate Moss	David Sims
October	Maaike Klaasen	Sofia Sanchez & Mauro Mongiello
November	Annie Arnander	Sofia Sanchez & Mauro Mongiello
December	Jadi Wegener	Dima Hohlov

=== 2026 ===
Issue	Cover model	Photographer
January	Christiane Paul	Linda Rosa Saal
February	Evelina Dragic	Sofia Sanchez & Mauro Mongiello
March	Riley Keough	Sofia Sanchez & Mauro Mongiello
April	Bella Rose	Regan Cameron
May/June	Marissa Long	Sofia Sanchez & Mauro Mongiello
July	Ibo Bodi	Sofia Sanchez & Mauro Mongiello
July	Aurélie Carina	Sofia Sanchez & Mauro Mongiello
August	Grace Van Patten	Regan Cameron
September	Loli Bahia	Inez & Vinoodh
October	Christy Turlington	Regan Cameron

== See also ==
- List of Vogue Deutsch cover models
