= Roman and Gabriel Slaybaugh =

American models (born 1971)

Roman and Gabriel Slaybaugh are twin American models from LaPorte, Indiana, born on March 17, 1971. The twins' parents Richard and Terri Slaybaugh named them after All Pro football player Roman Gabriel. Early on in the twins' life, Roman and Gabriel found success on the football field that introduced them to their names.

The models began their modeling career while attending college on football scholarships. They were first discovered at age 20 during a visit to Chicago, by talent scout Paula Palm. After their discovery, the twins were introduced to the male modeling agency Success Models from Paris, France. Success Models handed the twins two round-trip tickets to Paris, France to board the flight within 48 hours. With only $30 between the both of them, they set off to Europe not knowing what was ahead.

== Career ==
Roman and Gabriel were then based out of Paris, France where they began working with such photographers as Bruce Weber, Mario Testino, TYEN, Sante D'Orazio, Paolo Roversi, Tiziano Magni, and Cindy Palmano.

The twins were a commodity working with top designers on print and runway with Versace, Armani, Pierre Cardin, Gianfranco Ferre, Montana, Thierry Mugler, Burberry, GAP, Polo Sport, etc. They also worked with female supermodels such as Nikki Taylor, Yasmeen Ghauri, Helena Christensen, and early in her career Heidi Klum.

The twins appeared in many top publication during the 90s and early 2000s, in such magazines as GQ, Esquire, Luomo Vogue, British GQ, Premier Magazine, Cosmopolitan, Mondo Luomo, and Harper's Bazaar.

== Agencies ==
1. Success Models Paris, France
2. Mens Board Miami, FL
3. Click Models NY, NY
4. Karin Models NY, NY
5. Models One London, UK
6. LA Models, LA, CA
7. Mitchell Models, San Francisco, CA
8. Italy Models Milan, Italy
9. Bananas Models Paris, France
10. Arlene Wilson Chicago, IL

== Retirement ==
Twins officially retired in 2002 to spend more time with their families. Roman now resides with his wife Jonna and their two children (son) Stoan and (daughter) Peyton. Gabriel enjoys spending time with his family and friends traveling, photography, and offroading 4x4.
