= Kara Young =

Kara Young can refer to:

- Kara Young (actress), American stage actress, winner of a Tony Award in 2024 and 2025
- Kara Young (model), American model and entrepreneur
