= Mark Abrahams =

Mark Abrahams may refer to:

- Mark Abrahams (photographer) (born 1958), American fashion and portrait photographer
- Mark Abrahams (musician) (born 1978), English guitarist

== See also ==
- Marc Abrahams (born 1956), editor and co-founder of Annals of Improbable Research, and the originator of the Ig Nobel Prize celebration
- Mark Abraham (born 1953), member of the Louisiana Senate
