= Michael Williams (photographer) =

Australian photographic artist

- Born: 1956; Melbourne, Australia
- Died: 17 September 2024 (aged 67)
- Occupation: Photographer
- Spouse: Annette Soumilas (m. 1990)
- Children: Rudi Williams

Michael Williams (1956–2024) was an Australian photographic artist known for his vivid still and moving images capturing Melbourne’s urban life. His work spanned Polaroid, Kodachrome, and panoramic formats, often exploring the aesthetics and contradictions of suburban expansion. Williams exhibited in Australia and Europe, and his work is held in major public and private collections.

== Career ==
Beginning in the early 1980s, Williams documented the streets, beaches, and fringe suburbs of Melbourne using a medium format camera and a Polaroid SX70. Bold colour and open-flash photography became signature elements of his work. Several images were included in an exhibition at Gallery 18 in South Melbourne in 1983.

While studying at Rusden State College, Williams began working with Kodachrome, drawn to its rich tonal range and enduring quality. In 1989, he relocated to Milan, where Gallery Il Diaframma hosted his solo exhibition A Touch of Colour. Works from this series were later acquired by BP Oil Europe and projected at the Palais de Tokyo in Paris.

In the mid-1990s, Williams began producing panoramic photographs of Melbourne’s outer suburban edges. The resulting series, Life Sanctuary, offered a detailed visual record of suburban expansion. It was first exhibited as part of the Endangered Species exhibition at Horsham Regional Art Gallery and later shown at Patrizia Autore Gallery in Melbourne and Plimsoll Gallery in Hobart.

Williams brought a cinematic sensibility to his depiction of the built environment, often blending idealism with irony. His Sanctuary Lakes series documented the transformation of marginal farmland into a planned residential estate, from piles of earth and empty roads to an idealised landscape with manicured lawns, an artificial lake, and a golf course.

In the exhibition catalogue for Return to the Real, Anthony Curtis described Williams’s work as “profoundly cinematic,” noting the intense colour, detailed composition, and contemplative quality of his photographs. The catalogue highlighted the Sanctuary Lakes project as a commentary on the aesthetics and illusions of suburban development.

== Selected solo exhibitions ==
- 1990 – A Touch of Colour, Gallery Il Diaframma, Milan
- 2000 – Life Sanctuary, Patrizia Autore Gallery, Melbourne
- 2002 – Return to the Real, Plimsoll Gallery, Hobart
- 2015 – Chromophobia, Colour Factory, Melbourne
- 2019 – Architecture of Dreams, Kokonton Gallery, Venice

== Collections ==
Works by Michael Williams are held in the collections of:

- National Gallery of Victoria
- Monash Gallery of Art (MAPh)
- City of Port Phillip
- BP Oil Brussels
- Centre Nationale de Photographie, Paris
- Performing Arts Museum, Melbourne

== Publications ==
- Williams, Michael (2024). COLOUR 1982–1992 Limited edition self published artist book
- Williams, Michael (2024). COLOUR 1982–1992. Light of Day Books.
- A selection of Michael Williams' photographic survey of Melbourne's western suburbs, taken between 1983 and 1988 featured in the 2016 Mirage Issue of Pataphysics Magazine
