= Nadja Auermann =

German supermodel and actress

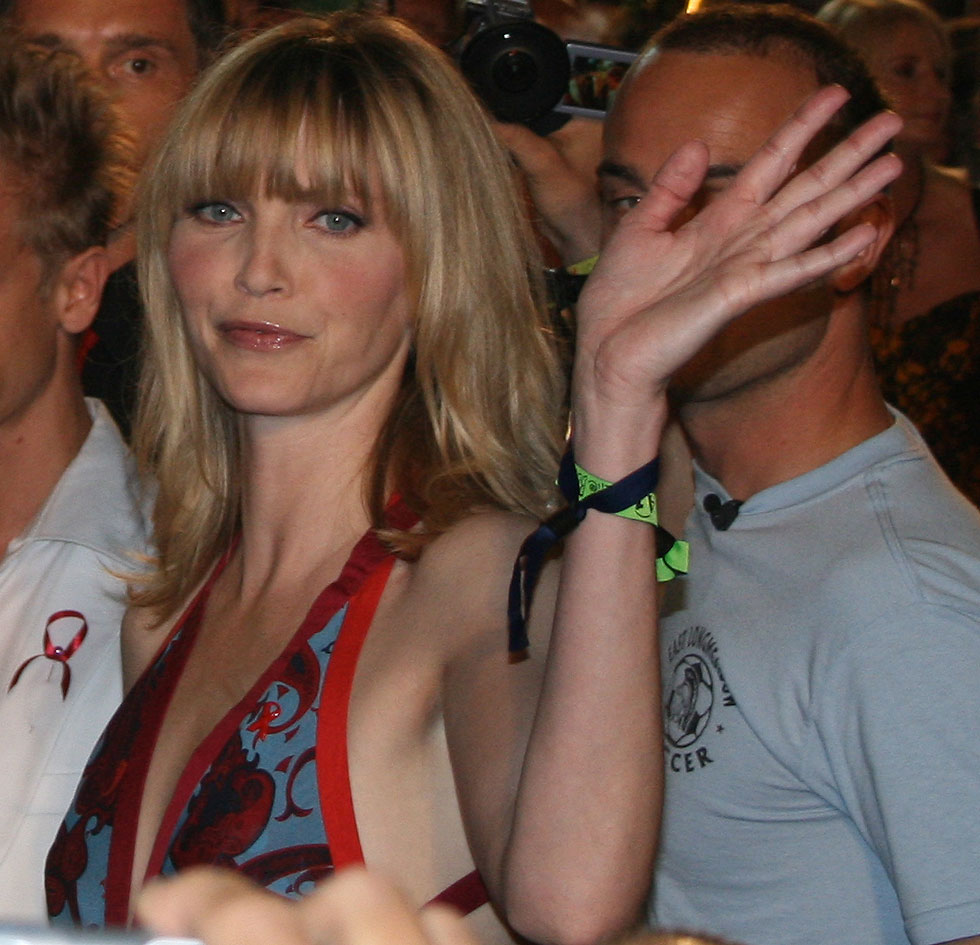
- Auermann at Life Ball 2007
- Born: 19 March 1971 (age 55); West Berlin, West Germany
- Children: 4
- Modeling information
- Height: 5 ft 11 in (1.80 m)
- Hair color: Blonde
- Eye color: Blue
- Agency: DNA Model Management (New York); VIVA Model Management (Paris); Models 1 (London); VIVA Models Berlin (Berlin)

Nadja Auermann (born 19 March 1971) is a German supermodel and actress. She was once stated by the Guinness Book of Records to have the longest legs of any model in the world.

== Biography ==
In 1989, Auermann was discovered in a cafe in Berlin and signed to Karin Modeling Agency in Paris. In 1991, she moved from Karin to Elite Model Management and appeared in Vogue Paris and in Benetton clothing advertisements. In September 1994, she was featured on the cover of both Vogue and Harper's Bazaar.

Auermann has walked the runway for many brands, including Thierry Mugler, Dolce & Gabbana, Fendi and Yves Saint Laurent She has appeared in advertising campaigns for, among others, Prada, Chanel, Dolce & Gabbana and Hermès. She was the international spokesperson for Shiseido in the late 1990s. Auermann has appeared on more than 100 magazine covers worldwide, including Vogue, Elle, Harper's Bazaar and i-D.

Throughout her career she has worked with renowned photographers including Helmut Newton, Steven Meisel, Craig McDean, Juergen Teller and Peter Lindbergh, who saw her as his muse.

== Personal life ==
In 1997, Auermann had her first child, a daughter named Cosima, with Olaf Björn Tietz. Cosima is now a model. In 1999, Auermann married German actor Wolfram Grandezka. Their son, Nicolas, was born in the same year. Nicolas is also now a model. Auermann and Grandezka divorced a few years later. Auermann gave birth to her third and fourth children in 2010 and 2013.

Auermann enjoys spending her holidays in the spa town of Heiligendamm on Germany's Baltic coast. She was convicted of tax evasion by a German court in 2011 and was fined 90,000 EUR. In an interview with the German press in 2013, she revealed that she was living with her children and partner, whose name she has kept secret, in Dresden.

== See also ==
- List of people from Berlin
