= Torkil Gudnason =

Denmark-born American photographer

Torkil Gudnason (born in Denmark) is a New York-based fashion photographer.

== Biography ==
A native of Denmark, Gudnason approaches photography with a simple, graphic, Scandinavian sensibility. He prefers shooting in color to play hues off of each other. When asked to list five things he couldn't live without as a photographer, his characteristically succinct answer was: "Light, light, light, light and more light."

== Career ==
Gudnason has shot fashion stories for Vogue, Tatler, Harper's Bazaar, Elle, Flaunt, Allure, Marie Claire, Paper, Dansk, Surface, Vanity Fair. Gudnason has contributed to the image development of Estée Lauder, Guerlain, Elizabeth Arden, L'Oréal, Lancôme, Piaget, MAC Cosmetics, Bergdorf Goodman, Montblanc, Lexus, Rolex, Huit, Givenchy, Shiseido, Armani. Celebrity subjects have most famously included Catherine Zeta-Jones, Beyoncé, Liv Tyler, Miloš Forman, Rosario Dawson, Diane Kruger, Isaac Mizrahi, Lars von Trier, Andie MacDowell. André 3000 (OutKast), Björk, Sean Lennon, Gong Li, Udo Kier, Mikhail Baryshnikov, Christian Lacroix, Bette Midler, Sharon Stone, Jamie King, Andrée Putman, and models such as Claudia Schiffer, Naomi Campbell, Elizabeth Hurley, Christy Turlington, and Kate Moss.

== Exhibitions ==
Personal Structures: Open Borders, Venice Biennale, Venice, Italy, 2017

Status:15, Danmarks Fotomuseum, Denmark, 2016

Viborg Kunsthal, Viborg, Denmark, 2014

Torkil Gudnason, Galerie Gris, Hudson, NY, 2014

Body Vase, Galerie A, Paris, France, 2013

The Naked & The Nude, Curated by Peter Weiermair, Hasted Kraeutler Gallery, New York, 2013

Electric Blossom, Edelman Arts, New York, NY 2012

Electric Blossom, Galerie Gris, Hudson, NY 2012

Fashion Photography – Tradition and Invention, Preus – national museum of photography in Norway, Horten, Norway, 2012

Hot House, Ports 1961 Gallery, New York, NY, 2009

Dreamwomen - Beauty in the 21st century, Deichtorhallen Hamburg, GERMANY, 2008

Torkil Gudnason exhibition, MA2 Gallery, Tokyo, JAPAN, 2007

Natural Elements, Part II, Bridgewater/Lustberg & Blumenfeld, New York, NY, 2000

A Big Show of Small Work, Bridgewater/Lustberg & Blumenfeld, New York, NY, 1998+1999

Organics, Bridgewater/Lustberg, New York, NY, 1996

Natural Elements, Bridgewater/Lustberg, New York, NY, 1994

Permanent Collection, Photo Museum Odense, DENMARK, 1994

Permanent Collection, MoMA, Wakayama, JAPAN, 1993

Organic Elements, Charlottenborg Academy of Fine Arts, Copenhagen, DENMARK, 1993

Organic Series, Reykavil Municipal Art Museum, Reykavil, ICELAND, 1992

The Colors of Fashion, Arcade Gallery, FIT, New York, NY, 1992

Faculty Show, Center for Photography at Woodstock, Woodstock, NY, 1990

Art of Persuasion, International Center of Photography (ICP), New York, NY, 1988

Photography for Advertising, George Eastman House, Rochester, NY, 1987

== Awards ==
Certificate of Excellence, American Photography, Men's Journal, January 1995

Northwest Addy Award, Merit, Nike for Wieden+Kennedy, 1994

Award of Excellence., Society of Newspaper Design, Washington Post Magazine, December 1994

MPA Kelly Award. Magazine Publishers of America, October 1993

PDN/Nikon, 1st Prize, Art Directors Club. New York, October 1991

Award of Excellence. Photography Annual by Communication Arts Mag. California, August 1991

Creativity Eighty; Editorial for GQ, New York, August 1980

Ilford. Golden Release. 1st Prize. Denmark, 1976

Europhot Youth Scholarship, Foundation Maeght, St Paul de Vence, France, 1973

== Bibliography ==
=== Published books ===
"Wop Bam Boom," Torkil Gudnason Studio, 2017, ISBN 978-1-64007-256-5

"Body Vase", Damiani Press, 2013, ISBN 978-88-6208-296-9

"Torkil Gudnason - Selected Photographs 2005-2010", North8Editions, 2010, USA, ISBN 978-1-4507-4466-9

"Hot House", Torkil Gudnason Studio, 2010, USA

=== Articles / Featured in Books ===
"Cover Profile" Advertising Technique. No 8 (Dec. 1980) p. 1 & p. 6-8

"Cover Story" Commercial Photo. Japan No. 217 (Aug. 1981) p. 1 & p. 35-56

"New Talent" Art Direction Magazine (Apr. 1983) p. 11-14

"From Silk to Marble" with Colette. Kunstlerhaus Bethanien, Berlin (1985) (27 plates in color)

"Whats new Portfolio" Adweek 27, No.9 (Feb. 24, 1986) p. 48

"Cube Root" Advertising Technique (Mar. 1986) p. 14-19

"The Art of Persuasion" by Robert A. Sobiezek, Harry Abrams, NY (Mar. 1988) p. 188 (plate 146)

"Collection Images" Special issue of Kodak's International Photography Magazine (Sep. 1992) p. 34

"Cover -profile" Foto & Film, Denmark (nr.7/8, Aug. 1992) p. 16-21

"Color of Fashion" Published by Stewart, Tabori & Chang, Inc. NY (Dec. 1993) p. 68, 186

"Organic Series" Blind Spot, New Photography. Premiere issue, NY (Jan. 1993)

"Idea Mag." T.Gudnason, photogr., Intl Adv. Art, Japan (Feb. 1993 #237) p. 76-82

"Moschino" Leonardo Arte, Italy, (Oct. 1997) p. 43, 72

"Wildness" Dolce & Gabbana, Italy (Nov. 1998) p. 132-133

"Mode;Models" Hiro Ikeda, Publisher, Tokyo, Japan (Sep. 1998) p. 38-41

"Manolo Blahnik" HarperCollins (Aug. 2000) p. 86

"Masterminds of Mode" Hiro Ikeda, Publisher, Tokyo, Japan (Feb. 2000) p. 45

"Beaute du Siecle" Editions Assouline, Paris (Mar. 2000) p. 283, 297, 322

"Graphis - The Int. Journal of Design and Communication", #342, NY (Nov./Dec. 2002), p. 66-87, ISSN 0017-3452

"Graphis Photo Annual 2004", 2004, p. 39, ISBN 1-931241-33-3

"Beauty in Vogue" Ediciones Conde Nast S.A., 2006, 'Golden Torso', ISBN 84-611-4050-8

"Pucci" Benedikt Taschen, Taschen, Limited Edition of 10,000 copies, Italy, 2010, p. 182-183 + 374-375 ISBN 978-3-8365-0736-3

"American Photography 27", USA, 2011, Front Cover & Back Cover + p. 124-125 ISBN 1-886212-36-8

"Motefotografi - Tradisjon og Nyskapning" Preus Museum - national museum of photography in Norway, 2012, p. 64-71, ISBN 978-82-92999-02-8
