= Amber Valletta =

American model and actress (born 1974)

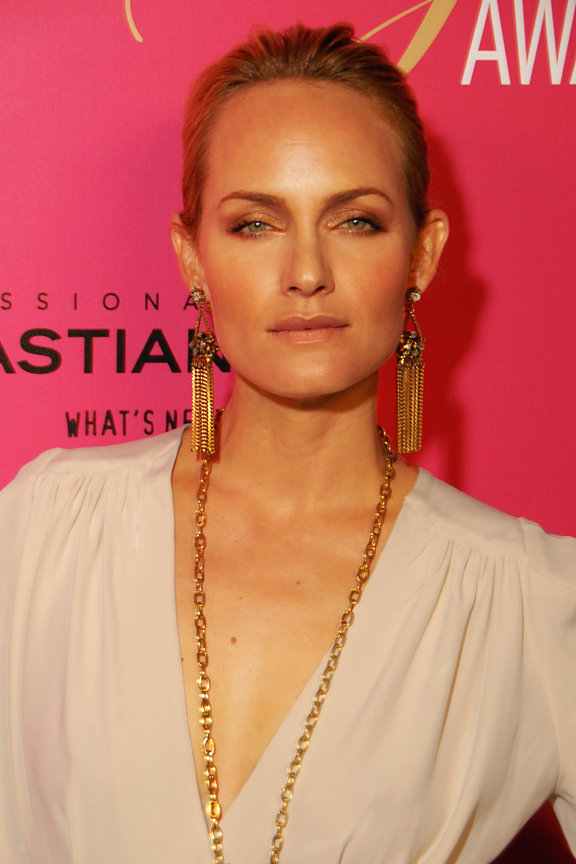
- Valletta at Hollywood Style Awards, 2009
- Born: February 9, 1974 (age 52); Tucson, Arizona, United States
- Occupations: Model; actress
- Years active: 1993–present
- Spouses: Hervé Le Bihan (m. 1994; div. 1996); Chip McCaw (m. 2003; div. 2015)
- Children: 1
- Relatives: Robert Parks-Valletta (half-brother)
- Modeling information
- Height: 5 ft 9 in (1.76 m)
- Hair color: Blonde
- Eye color: Green
- Agency: The Society Management (New York); View Management (Barcelona)

Amber Valletta (born February 9, 1974) is an American model and actress. She began her career as a fashion model, landing her first of 17 American Vogue covers in February 1993. During the 1990s, Valletta reached the status of supermodel, working as the face of Giorgio Armani, Chanel, Escada, Louis Vuitton, Prada, Valentino, Gucci, and Versace, and signing multimillion-dollar cosmetics contracts with Calvin Klein and Elizabeth Arden. From 1995 to 1996, Valletta and her friend and fellow model Shalom Harlow hosted the MTV show House of Style.

In the 2000s, Valletta began to focus on her career as an actress. She had her first major film role as a poltergeist in Robert Zemeckis's supernatural thriller What Lies Beneath (2000). She has since appeared in films such as Hitch (2005), Transporter 2 (2005), Man About Town (2006), Dead Silence (2007), Gamer (2009), and The Spy Next Door (2010). In 2011, she moved to television, appearing in a recurring role as the fallen socialite Lydia Davis on ABC's drama television series Revenge. In 2015, Valletta starred as the scheming Carla Briggs in another ABC soap opera, Blood & Oil.

== Early life ==
Amber Valletta was raised in Tulsa, Oklahoma, and graduated from Washington High School. Her mother, Theresa Malaby, survived breast cancer. Her ancestry includes Portuguese (through her grandmother), English, Italian, and Cherokee. Valletta is a Cherokee Nation citizen. Her half-brother is actor and producer Robert Parks-Valletta.

== Career ==
=== Modeling ===
Valletta got her start in the fashion industry when her mother enrolled her in modeling school at the age of 15 at the Linda Layman Agency. Valletta, along with the likes of Kate Moss, Eva Herzigová, Tyra Banks, Carolyn Murphy and Shalom Harlow, was one of the most recognizable faces of the generation immediately subsequent to the original supermodels. During the 1990s she appeared 13 times on the cover of American Vogue, second only to Claudia Schiffer's sixteen. Valletta was presented on the November 1999 Millennium cover of American Vogue as one of the "Modern Muses."

During the 1990s, Valletta was part of the generation of models associated with the rise of the “heroin chic” aesthetic, a controversial fashion trend characterized by extremely thin physiques, pale complexions and a deliberately disheveled, grunge-inspired look in editorials and advertising campaigns.

She has appeared on the cover of several international fashion magazines, such as Germany's Cosmopolitan and Glamour; Spain's Elle, Telva and Harper's Bazaar; the UK's Esquire and Love; and the US's V, Porter, Interview, Ocean Drive, Shape, Allure, Marie Claire and i-D. Valletta has walked in fashion shows for Versace, Lanvin, Louis Vuitton, Balenciaga, Gucci, Valentino, Prada, Michael Kors, Alberta Ferretti, Claude Montana, Dolce & Gabbana, Pierre Balmain, Sonia Rykiel, Versus, Yohji Yamamoto, Anna Molinari, Calvin Klein, Christian Dior and Tom Ford. She was the face of NARS Cosmetics' Spring 2010 Collection.

One of the most memorable moments of Amber Valletta's runway career occurred when she presented the tropical green dress by Versace, later known as the “jungle dress”. The piece, created by Donatella Versace, was part of the brand's spring/summer 2000 collection and was worn by Valletta during the fashion house's runway show.

The dress became globally famous a few months later when it was worn by Jennifer Lopez at the 2000 Grammy Awards, in one of the most talked-about appearances in the event’s history. The enormous interest generated by images of the singer wearing the dress led Google to create the service Google Images, due to the large number of searches related to the outfit.

Valletta also continued to work with photographer Steven Meisel. Not only was she selected by Steven Meisel for the 2014 50th Anniversary Cover of Italian Vogue but one of her prior Italian Vogue editorials with super model Tracy James and photographed by Meisel was selected as one of Italian Vogues most Iconic photos.

Valletta continues to work as a fashion model, closing the Versace Autumn/Winter 2017 fashion show. She was also model for Marks and Spencer. In 2018, Valletta appeared in advertisements for Mango, Blumarine, Escada, Chanel Watches, Prada and David Yurman. In 2019, she appeared on the cover of Vogue Korea and U.S. Elle, advertising campaigns for Stella McCartney and Holt Renfrew, and editorials for Italian, American and Arabian Vogue.

=== Acting ===
Valletta's first role was in the comedy film Drop Back Ten (2000). Later that year, she played a supporting role in the thriller film What Lies Beneath, starring Harrison Ford and Michelle Pfeiffer and directed by Robert Zemeckis. She appeared alongside Nicolas Cage in The Family Man. In 2003, she played Celine in Danny DeVito's Duplex, starring Ben Stiller and Drew Barrymore, and in 2004, she played Martina in Raising Helen, opposite Kate Hudson, Hayden Panettiere, Abigail Breslin, and Helen Mirren.

Valletta's first major film role was as Allegra Cole in Andy Tennant's romantic comedy Hitch. The film was released on February 11, 2005, and was a box office and critical success. She also had a role in Transporter 2, playing the mother of the kidnapped child. She played the female lead in the 2006 independent film The Last Time, co-starring alongside Michael Keaton and Brendan Fraser. In 2007, she had supporting roles in the horror film Dead Silence, as Ella Ashen, and as Claire in Premonition, starring Sandra Bullock. Also in 2007, Valletta played the leading role in the independent coming-of-age film My Sexiest Year.

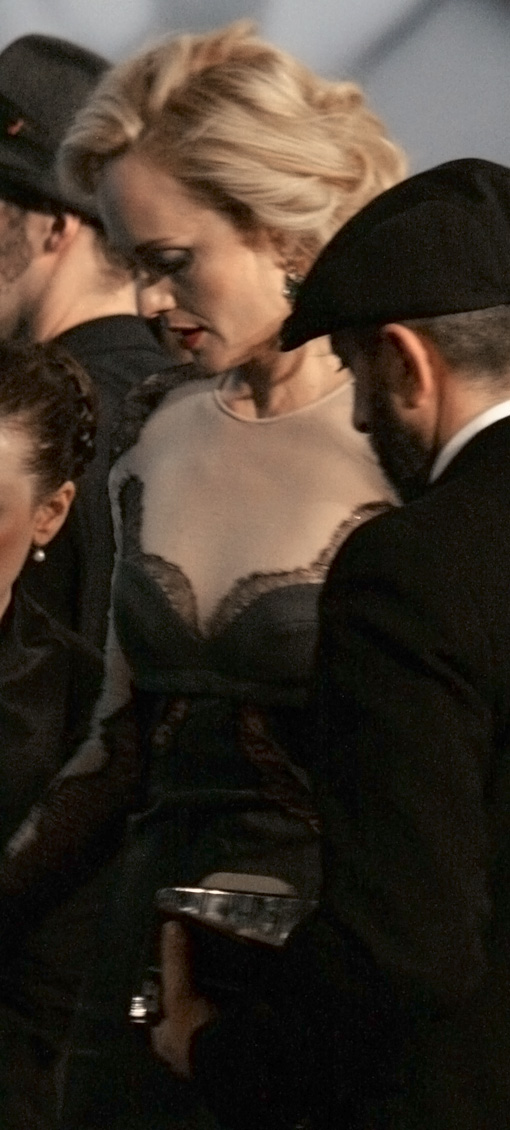
Valletta at the Life Ball 2009, Rathaus, Vienna.

In 2009, Valletta starred alongside Gerard Butler in the science fiction action film Gamer. The film was released in North America on September 4, 2009, to negative reviews from critics. In 2010, she starred in The Spy Next Door, alongside Jackie Chan, George Lopez, and Billy Ray Cyrus; she played Chan's character's love interest, Gillian. In 2011, she appeared in the ensemble comedy film Girl Walks into a Bar.

In 2011, Valletta was cast in the recurring role as the socialite Lydia Davis on the ABC television prime time soap opera Revenge. In 2014, she was a regular cast member in the TNT crime drama series Legends, playing Sean Bean's character's ex-wife. In 2015, Valletta starred in the short-lived ABC prime-time soap opera Blood & Oil. She played Carla Briggs, the glamorous business partner and new wife of oil tycoon Hap Briggs (Don Johnson).

In 2016, Valletta starred in the video for Keith Urban's song "Blue Ain't Your Color," directed by Carter Smith. She also starred in the video for Fergie's song "M.I.L.F. $."

=== Other projects ===
Valletta serves as the spokesperson for Oceana's Seafood Contamination Campaign, to raise awareness of the dangers of mercury poisoning in various kinds of seafood. The decision to join Oceana's campaign was prompted by the mercury-poisoning experience of a friend and the fact that she is a mother.

In 2025, she was appointed a Goodwill Ambassador for the United Nations Environment Programme (UNEP), a role in which she uses her public profile to draw attention to issues such as climate change and sustainable practices within the fashion industry.

== Personal life ==
Valletta married Hervé Le Bihan in 1994, divorcing in 1996. In 2000, Valletta had a son with Olympic volleyball player Chip McCaw; the pair wed in September 2003 and divorced in 2014.

Valletta endorsed incumbent Democratic President Barack Obama for re-election in 2012.

In July 2014, Valletta spoke out about her battle with drug and alcohol addiction.

== Filmography ==
=== Film ===
Year	Title	Role	Notes
1995	Unzipped	Herself	Documentary film
2000	Drop Back Ten	Mindy Deal	
2000	What Lies Beneath	Madison Elizabeth Frank	
2000	The Family Man	Paula	
2001	Perfume	Blair	
2001	Hysteria – The Def Leppard Story	Lorelei Shellist	Television film
2001	Max Keeble's Big Move	Ms. Dingman	
2003	Duplex	Celine	
2004	Raising Helen	Martina	
2005	Hitch	Allegra Cole	
2005	Transporter 2	Audrey Billings	
2006	Man About Town	Brynn Lilly	
2006	The Last Time	Belisa	
2007	Dead Silence	Ella Ashen	
2007	Premonition	Claire Francis	
2007	My Sexiest Year	Marina	
2008	Days of Wrath	Jane Summers	
2009	Gamer	Angie "Nika" Roth Tilman	
2010	The Spy Next Door	Gillian	
2011	Girl Walks into a Bar	Camilla	
2017	Walking	Herself / model	Documentary film
2017	Kevyn Aucoin Beauty & the Beast in Me	Herself	Documentary film
2017	A Film for Planned Parenthood of New York City	Herself	Documentary film
2017	Double Dutchess: Seeing Double	Herself	Segment "M.I.L.F. $"
TBA	Hello & Paris †	TBA	Filming

=== Television ===
Year	Title	Role	Notes
1995–1996	House of Style	Herself	Host
2003	Lucky	Sarah	Episode: "Something for Everyone"
2005	Punk'd	Herself	Episode: "Episode #6.4"
2009	State of the Union	Herself	Episode: "Episode #2.2"
2011–2014	Revenge	Lydia Davis	Recurring role, 14 episodes
2014	Legends	Sonya Odum	Series regular, 10 episodes
2015	Hot in Cleveland	Ashley	Episode: "Scandalous"
2015	Blood & Oil	Carla Briggs	Series regular, 10 episodes
2018	Movie Night With Karlie Kloss	Herself	Episode: "Hitch"
2019	RuPaul's Drag Race	Herself / Guest Judge	Episode: "From Farm to Runway"

=== Music videos ===
Year	Artist	Song	Notes
2008	Will.i.am	"Yes We Can"	
2014	Keith Urban	"Cop Car"	
2016	Fergie	"M.I.L.F. $"	
2016	Keith Urban	"Blue Ain't Your Color"	
