= Rosemary McGrotha =

American fashion model (born 1958)

- Born: Rosemary McGrotha; November 8, 1958 (age 67); Tallahassee, Florida, United States
- Modeling information
- Height: 5 ft 9 in (1.75 m)
- Hair color: Brunette
- Eye color: Blue

Rosemary McGrotha (born November 8, 1958, in Tallahassee, Florida, United States) is an American fashion model. A reoccurring model for the Donna Karan brand, McGrotha appears in almost all of the TV and print ads in the 1980s and early 1990s. She was referred to as the "career woman ideal" and in her memoirs Karan said she was cast as her "alter ego". McGrotha appeared in a popular 1992 ad campaign for Donna Karan called "In Women We Trust", where she portrayed the President of the United States. She regularly worked with fashion photographers: Helmut Newton, Norman Parkinson, Gilles Bensimon, and Denis Piel.
