= Esther Heesch =

German female fashion model (born 20th century)

Esther Heesch is a German fashion model.

== Early life and education ==
Heesch's mother is a goldsmith; her father is a doctor. She has an older sister and a younger brother. She has been a dancer since the age of seven.

== Career ==
Heesch was discovered in Hamburg at the end of 2011 at the age of fifteen by a scout from a modeling agency and signed a contract there. Her breakthrough came through the Christian Dior Couture Show in Paris in July 2012. Shortly afterwards, she walked in five shows at Berlin Fashion Week. In 2012, she was on the cover of D Magazine three times and on the cover of the Danish Elle once.

In the spring of 2013, Heesch walked in fifty-five shows at the international fashion weeks in New York City, Milan and Paris, and another forty-four in the fall of 2013.

In 2012 and 2013, Heesch appeared in several editorials of magazines, including the Italian, German, Japanese and Turkish Vogue, Dazed & Confused, i-D, Interview, and Vanity Fair.

Heesch had further engagements in 2012 and 2013 for the advertising campaigns of Chloé, Emporio Armani, Valentino and Closed. In 2014, she was the face of the Tom Ford and Valentino Spring/Summer 2014 campaigns.

== Personal life ==
Heesch has been in a relationship with Finnish football goalkeeper Lukáš Hrádecký since 2021. The couple had a daughter in January 2024.
