= Eric Boman =

Swedish-Argentine archaeologist

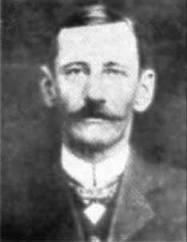
Eric Boman

Eric Boman (June 5, 1867 – November 29, 1924) was a Swedish Argentine archaeologist.

== Life and work ==
Boman was born in Falun, Sweden, in 1867. He relocated to Argentina in 1889, and completed his secondary schooling in Buenos Aires and Catamarca. He remained in the mountainous province of Catamarca, and was appointed a Justice of the Peace.

Boman began his archaeological experience in a 1901 Swedish expedition into Purmamarca and the Quebrada de Humahuaca (Jujuy Province) directed by Baron Erland Nordenskiold, a nobleman whose family included a number of noted travelers; Nordenskiold later authored an account of that expedition, Travels on the Boundaries of Bolivia and Argentina. Boman joined a further expedition, with Marquis Georges de Crequi-Montfort, into the Cerro Chañi area (Jujuy), in 1903, and discovered Tastil, an Atacameño settlement that was one of the region's most significant until their siege by troops of the Inca Empire. He compiled his findings in Antiquités de la région andine de la Republique Argentine et du désert d'Atacama ("Antiquities in the Andean Region of Argentina and in the Atacama Desert"), which, when published in 1908, was recognized as one of the first comprehensive archaeological studies of the Argentine Northwest (comparable only to Juan Bautista Ambrosetti's work). Boman's work was honored also by the Académie Française, and the original is now in the Musée de l'Homme, in Paris.

Boman subsequently focused his studies on the archaeology of La Rioja Province, conducting excavations in Pucará de los Sauces, Fuerte del Pantano, other sites in the Famatina Range, as well as in other provinces, notably Tinti (in the Calchaquí Valleys) and in Buin, Chile. He created a sizable bibliography from the experiences, and these expeditions, conducted between 1910 and 1920, yielded the most comprehensive collection of Diaguita artifacts located up to then, making him an authority on the Pre-Inca cultures of the region.

Boman was appointed Chief of the Archaeological Department of the Bernardino Rivadavia Natural Sciences Museum in 1917, and remained at the post until his death in 1924.
