= Marc Hom =

Danish fashion photographer

Marc Hom is a Danish fashion photographer whose work consists of celebrity, portrait, fashion, and advertising photography.

== Biography ==
Marc Hom was born in 1967 in Copenhagen, Denmark. He studied photography at the Københavns Tekniske Skole in Denmark and moved to New York City in 1989.

After completing over a year of freelance work with established New York-based photographers, he was commissioned to do a photo book for the Vienna Ballet. Hom spent the next six months in Vienna photographing the ballet's principal dancers and directors and compiled a book of 80 images. Upon completion of the assignment, he returned to New York and began working with the late Liz Tilberis and Fabien Baron of Harper's Bazaar. This marked his introduction into the world of fashion photography and his establishment as a renowned photographer in the fashion world.

== Photography ==
Marc Hom has shot advertising campaigns for fashion brands such as Gucci, Max Mara, and Genny. His work has appeared in various publications such as W Magazine, Harper's Bazaar, Vanity Fair, British Vogue, Men's Vogue, Talk, The Face, The New Yorker, French Arena, Esquire, and The New York Times Magazine. His celebrity portfolio includes Iggy Pop, Cher, Faye Dunaway, Aretha Franklin, Christopher Walken, Alexander McQueen, Nino Cerruti, Vivienne Westwood, Polly Mellen, Johnny Depp, Julian Schnabel, Gwyneth Paltrow, and Anne Rice.

== Photo Books ==
Portraits by Marc Hom, teNeues 2006

Profiles by Marc Hom, teNeues 2016
