= Alisa Ahmann =

German fashion model

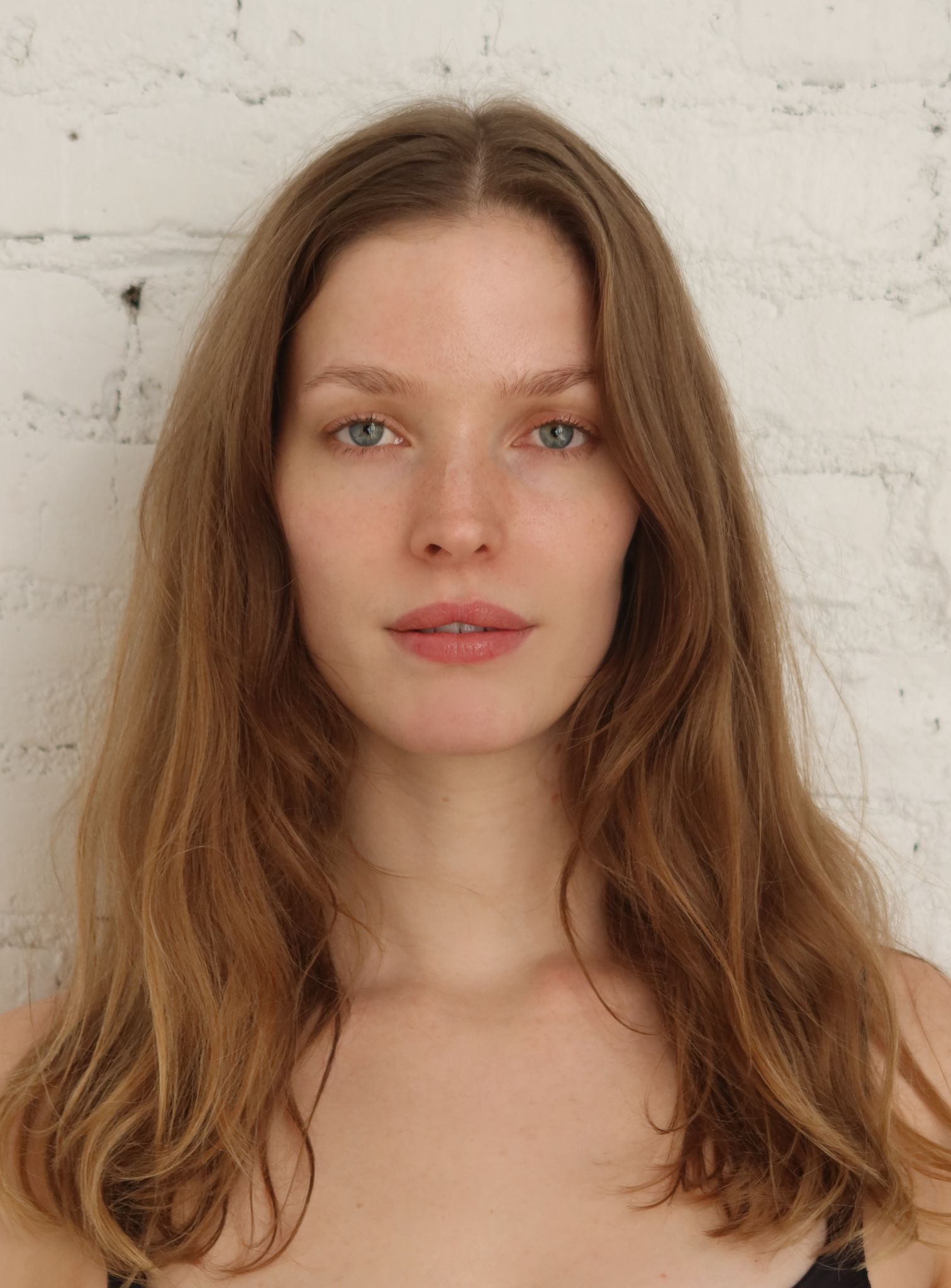
- Ahmann in 2023
- Born: 1 May 1994 (age 30); Stuttgart, Germany
- Modeling information
- Height: 1.80 m (5 ft 11 in)
- Hair color: Light brown
- Eye color: Blue
- Agency: A Management (Berlin, Hamburg) (mother agency); One Management (New York, Los Angeles); Marilyn Agency (Paris); Elite Model Management (Milan); Premier Model Management (London); Line-Up Model Management (Barcelona); Chic Management (Sydney); 62 Management (Auckland); Unique Models (Copenhagen); DAMAN (Istanbul); MIKAs (Stockholm)

Alisa Ahmann is a German fashion model.

== Career ==
Ahmann and her sisters (including twin Xenia) were discovered in Stuttgart, Germany when she was 16 years old. She debuted as a Calvin Klein Collection exclusive in 2014 and opened their F/W show. Within a year she did campaigns for Gucci and Alberta Ferretti, and walked for Hermès, Chloé, and Oscar de la Renta. She has also walked for Dior, Jil Sander, Donna Karan, Elie Saab, Stella McCartney, Valentino, Miu Miu, Alexander McQueen, and Giambattista Valli amongst others.

Ahmann has been on the cover of over 20 high-end fashion magazines such as Elle Germany, Vogue Germany, and Vogue Italia among others. She has appeared in magazines such as W, Vogue Brasil, Self Service, Vogue Paris, and Allure.

Ahmann was ranked as a "Top 50" model by Models.com.
