= Kara Young (model) =

American model and entrepreneur

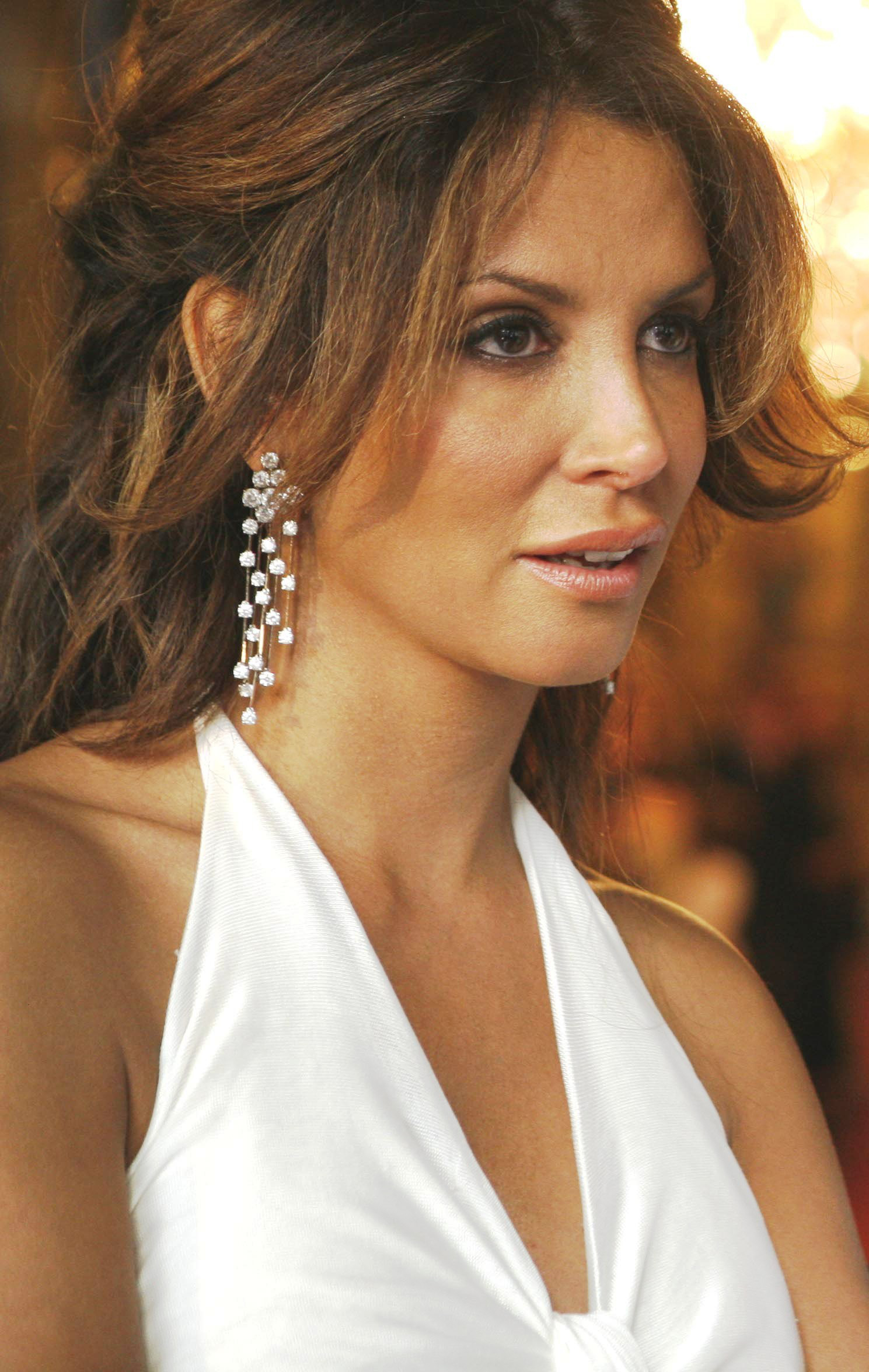
- Young in August 2000
- Born: December 10, 1969 (age 56); San Francisco, California, U.S.
- Spouse(s): Sante D'Orazio (m. 1994; div. 1998) Peter Georgiopoulos (m. 2005)
- Children: 2
- Modeling information
- Hair color: Brown
- Eye color: Brown

Kara Young (born December 10, 1969) is an American model and entrepreneur. As a model she represented several cosmetics companies and appeared three times on the cover of Vogue, Playboy (Germany) and was an entertainment news correspondent for Fox News Channel, as well as co-founding a hair product company and salon.

== Early life ==
Kara was born on December 10, 1969, in San Francisco, California, to parents Marie and Thomas Young. Her mother is of African American descent, whereas her father is of English and Scottish descent.

== Career ==
According to Young's company web site, between 1988 and 1998 she appeared in advertising campaigns for Revlon, L'Oreal, Clairol, Maybelline, as well as Victoria's Secret and was photographed by Richard Avedon for Revlon's "Most Unforgettable Women" campaign. Young was an A-list model and was profiled in the 1990 article "The New Top Models". She was a cover girl for Vogue in both 1988 and 1989, but is known best for her modeling with Victoria's Secret. She appeared on the covers of Vogue, Elle and Glamour magazine during the early 1990s. She later became an entertainment news correspondent for Fox News Channel. Young retired from modeling and became the co-founder of Hair Rules, a hair care product line and NYC salon.

== Personal ==
Young was married to photographer Sante D'Orazio in the mid-1990s. In the late 1990s, Young met Donald Trump at a party in the Hamptons, and they ended up dating for approximately two years beginning around 1997. In 2005, she married billionaire Peter Georgiopoulos, the founder of the General Maritime shipping company. Young lives in New York City with Georgiopoulos and their two children. She is a member of the board of directors for Action Against Hunger.
