= Walter Chin =

Jamaican photographer

- Born: Jamaica
- Known for: Photographer
- Website: ceruttiandco.com

Walter Chin is a fashion and celebrity photographer of Chinese descent who currently lives and works in New York City, U.S.

== Career ==
Walter Chin was born in Jamaica to a Chinese family, and grew up there and in Canada, where he served an apprenticeship in Toronto, Ontario.

After graduating with a master's degree in photography, Chin moved to Paris, where as a professional fashion photographer, he worked mainly for French Elle, before relocating to New York in 1990. His work has been published in many magazines, including Allure, Mademoiselle, several Vogues, Glamour, GQ, Interview, and Vanity Fair. He has also photographed advertising campaigns for designers such as Chanel, Valentino, Tommy Hilfiger, Missoni and Lancôme. In 2013 he was selected by Neiman Marcus to photograph their annual Art of Fashion Campaign that year.

In 1994 Chin was listed as one of the most important people in current photography by a panel of curators, dealers, editors and industry insiders for American Photo magazine. His inclusion on the list cited his modernism, use of colour and graphic form, and tight image cropping and the way in which his sitters appeared to constantly be in motion, drawing parallels with David Bailey and Martin Munkácsi. In 2001, the year Work in Progress, the first collection of his photographic work was published, he was still considered influential, but difficult to classify. He published a second book of photographs, After Shoot, in 2006.

One of his best known images, of a nude Gisele Bündchen on horseback, was published in Vanity Fair in 1999, and featured in a 2008 exhibition at the National Portrait Gallery, London dedicated to Vanity Fair portraits. In 2010, the Bündchen image was still cited as one for which Chin was "especially well known."

== Bibliography ==
- Work in Progress. Zürich u.a.: Edition Stemmle. 2001. ISBN 3908163277.
- After Shoot (1. Aufl. ed.). München: Schirmer Mosel. 2006. ISBN 3829602480.
