= Shalom Harlow =

Canadian supermodel and actress (born 1973)

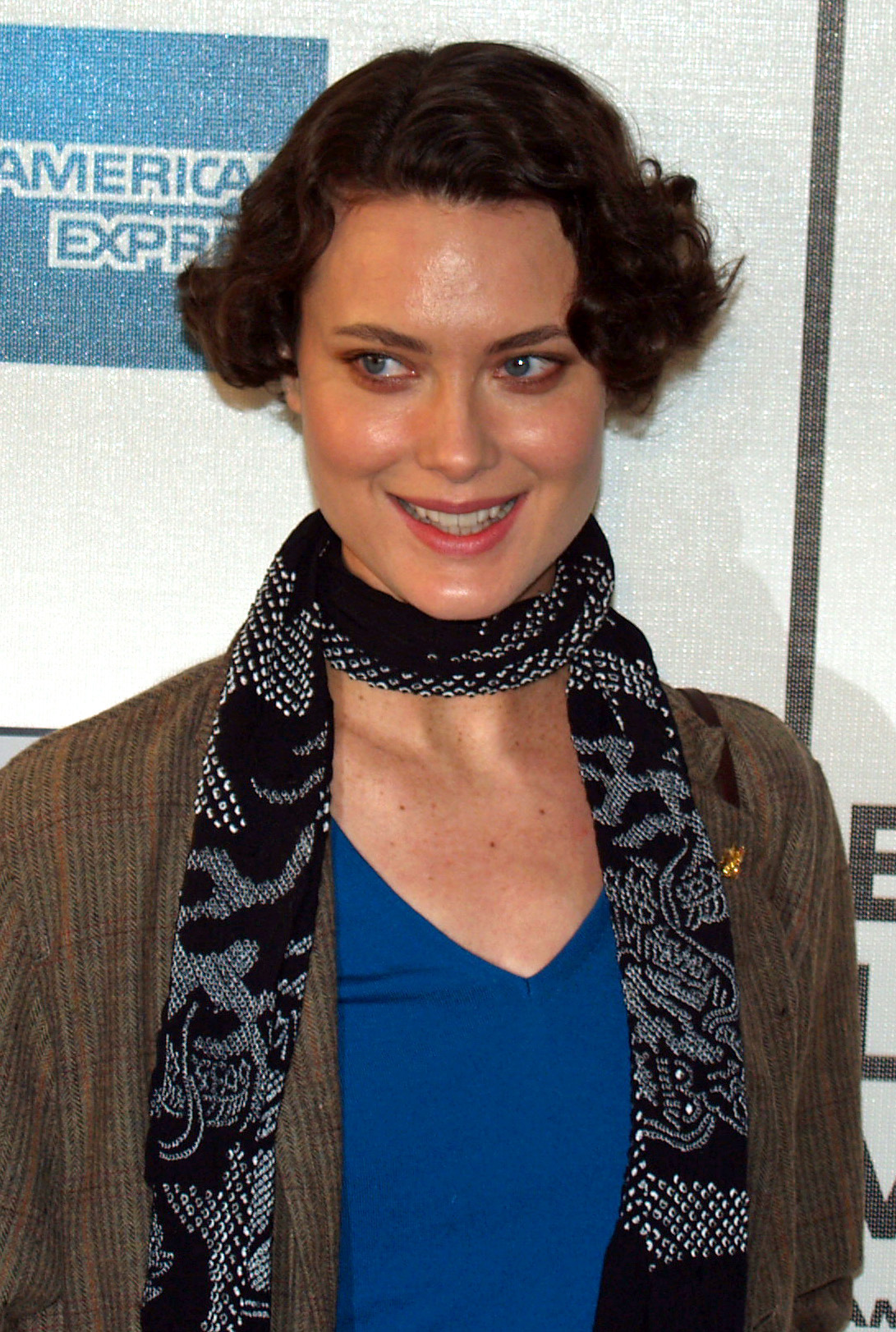
- Harlow in 2007
- Born: December 5, 1973 (age 52); Oshawa, Ontario, Canada
- Modelling information
- Height: 5 ft 11 in (1.80 m)
- Hair colour: Dark brown
- Eye colour: Blue
- Agency: IMG Models

Shalom Harlow (born December 5, 1973) is a Canadian model who began her career in the early 1990s, and by the end of the decade was at supermodel status. In 2007, Forbes listed her as thirteenth in the list of the World's Top-Earning Supermodels. She has also appeared in films such as In & Out (1997) and How to Lose a Guy in 10 Days (2003) and hosted MTV's House of Style alongside fellow model Amber Valletta.

== Early life and family ==
Harlow was born in Oshawa, Ontario, the daughter of Sandi Herbert and David Harlow. Her mother named her Shalom (Hebrew: שלום), meaning "peace", used as a standard greeting in Hebrew. Her father held several jobs as a social worker, real estate agent, and financial investor, while her mother, Sandi Herbert, worked with developmentally disabled adults. She grew up in a "hippie community just outside Toronto", and the family often spent time at their family cottage, built by her great-great grandfather. She has two younger brothers, Chris and Nathan.

Early on, Harlow took up ballet, which she later decided was not for her, as she claimed in a 2008 New York Times article, "My rebellious nature always comes out." She instead became interested in tap dancing, as she enjoyed the noise it created.

== Career ==
Harlow was discovered at age 15 while at a Cure concert in Toronto. Since being discovered she has appeared on numerous magazine covers, editorials, in top runway shows and in movies. Shalom has been the long-time favourite model for many designers who found that her look worked well in both commercial and couture campaigns.

During the 1990s, Harlow was part of the generation of models that emerged after the peak of the classic supermodels of the late 1980s. This period in fashion coincided with the rise of the aesthetic known as “heroin chic”, characterized by a minimalist style, very thin physiques, and a grunge-inspired visual atmosphere in fashion editorials and advertising campaigns.

Although the aesthetic became most closely associated with models such as Kate Moss, Harlow belonged to the same generation of 1990s models who helped define the visual language of fashion during that decade.

She became the first winner of Vogue/VH1's Model of the Year award in 1995. In 1996 she co-hosted MTV's House of Style with fellow supermodel Amber Valletta.

She was featured in the finale of Alexander McQueen's No.13 (Spring/Summer 1999) collection held in September 1998 at a warehouse in London. During the show she was spray painted in black and yellow by two robotic arms while standing on a revolving platform. In part because of the exhibition, the show has been called one of fashion's most memorable and iconic shows. The moment has been cited as inspiration for Bella Hadid's spray paint dress at Coperni Spring 2023.

In July 2007, she earned an estimated total of $2 million over the previous 12 months, with Forbes naming her thirteenth in the list of the World's 15 Top-Earning Supermodels.

Harlow contracted Lyme disease and black mold poisoning while living at a home in Big Sur in 2013, and experienced C-PTSD as a result of the illnesses.

=== 2018–present: Return to modelling ===
In September 2018, after a six year hiatus from runway modelling, she returned at Milan Fashion Week for the Versace show. After the runway show she was part of Versace's ad campaign for Spring/Summer 2019 shot by Steven Meisel.

She was featured on the cover of Vogue Italia in December 2018, her first magazine cover since June 2012.

In May 2023, she was featured on the cover of Vogue dedicated to Karl Lagerfeld shot at the Grand Palais alongside Adut Akech, Amber Valletta, Anok Yai, Devon Aoki, Gigi Hadid, Kendall Jenner, Liu Wen, Naomi Campbell and Natalia Vodianova.

Since the beginning of her career she has appeared on the cover of magazines such as Vogue, Elle, Harper's Bazaar, W, L'Officiel and Cosmopolitan. Harlow has also walked runways for Chanel, Dior, Prada, John Galliano, Fendi, Givenchy, Hermès, Yves Saint Laurent, Gucci, Alexander McQueen, Michael Kors and many more. She has appeared in advertising campaigns for Dolce & Gabbana, Max Mara, Ralph Lauren, Chloé, Giorgio Armani, Valentino, Lancôme, Saks Fifth Avenue, Gap and others.

== Filmography ==
=== Films ===
Year	Title	Role
1997	In & Out	Sonya
1999	Cherry	Leila Sweet
2001	Head over Heels	Jade
2001	Vanilla Sky	Colleen
2002	The Salton Sea	Nancy
2002	Happy Here and Now	Muriel
2003	How to Lose a Guy in 10 Days	Judy Green
2003	I Love Your Work	Charlotte
2004	Melinda and Melinda	Joan
2005	Game 6	Paisley Porter
2006	The Last Romantic	Christy Tipilton

=== Television ===
Year	Title	Role	Notes
1996–1997	House of Style	Herself	
2001	When I Was a Girl	Herself	1 episode
2004	The Jury	Melissa Greenfield	3 episodes

=== Documentaries ===
Year	Title	Role
1995	Unzipped	Herself
2013	Bettie Page Reveals All	Herself

== Print ==
- 1998 Pirelli Calendar, June
