= Denis Piel =

French photographer and film-maker (born 1944)

- Born: 1944 (age 81–82); France
- Occupation: photographer
- Website: denispiel.com

Denis Piel is a French photographer and film-maker. He was born in France in 1944. He was raised in Australia and educated in the United States. He lives in the south-west of France. He worked as a fashion photographer in the 1980s; from 1979 he was under contract to Condé Nast. He stopped taking fashion and advertising photographs in about 1990, and started a film company called Jupiter Films writing and directing TV commercials. In 2002 he made his first feature film Love is Blind A book of his photographs of women, with brief texts by him, Donna Karan and Polly Mellen, was published by Rizzoli in 2012.

Piel won the Leica Medal of Excellence for Commercial Photography in 1987. His work has been exhibited at WOA - Way Of Arts is Lisbon, Portugal and is held in the permanent collections of the Victoria and Albert museum and the Museum of Fine Arts, Boston.
