= Raymond Meier (photographer) =

Raymond Meier born in Switzerland in 1957, is a Swiss-American Photographer.

== Career ==
He began his photography career in 1972 while attending School of Applied Arts in Zurich and apprenticing in a commercial studio. At the age of twenty he opened his own studio in Zurich where he focused primarily on industrial and corporate photography. His work evolved to include portraiture, advertising, and ultimately fashion.

In 1986 he moved to New York City to concentrate on his still life photography. Since then he has come to be recognized as one of the leading photographers in his field. Over time Raymond’s photographs have evolved from still life to fashion images, and in recent years his work has included a significant amount of architectural photography.

Shortly after his arrival in New York Raymond became a consistent contributor to the fashion editorial scene through lasting collaborations with Harper’s Bazaar, American and International editions of Vogue (magazine) and The New York Times. He concurrently established long lasting relationships with major fashion, jewelry and cosmetic brands providing images that have shaped their visual identities for decades.

American Vogue (magazine) Editor in Chief Anna Wintour describes Meier’s work; "In the tradition of great Swiss visual geniuses, such as Josef Muller-Brockmann and Werner Bischof, whose visual precision was always richly evident in work both artistic and commercial, Raymond Meier has that unerring ability to infuse technically masterful compositions with charm and punch. In Meier's work, shearling boots float with astronauts, eagles clutch diamond brooches, and models fly out of stilettos. When Meier casts his eye on something, it soars beautifully."

Throughout his editorial and advertising career, Raymond has engaged in an independent photographic practice. His un-commissioned work stems from curiosity about the multi-faceted capacities of photography – from ambitious surveys of historic landmarks, and intense studio-based scrutiny of visual forms, to acute and simple photographic observation of the world around him.

Beginning in 1990, Raymond was among the first photographers to shoot color negatives and provide c-prints to magazines and advertising clients. By 1992 he was on the forefront of digital scanning and retouching. He has established a deep understanding and interest in the process of photography from concept to print that carried through from his analog to digital practices.

His first book, Louis Kahn Dhaka, was published in fall 2004. The two-volume set features the architecture of the capital complex in Dhaka, Bangladesh.

== Books ==
Louis Kahn Dhaka (Dino Simonett, 2004)
