= Kati Nescher =

- Born: 12 December 1984 (age 41); Russia
- Children: 1
- Modeling information
- Height: 1.80 m (5 ft 11 in)
- Hair color: Brown
- Eye color: Light Green
- Agency: DNA Model Management (New York); VIVA Model Management (Paris, London, Barcelona); Why Not Model Management (Milan); AM Modelmanagement (Dormagen)

Kati Nescher (born 12 December 1984) is a German model born in Russia.

== Career ==
Nescher was discovered at the age of 26 while living in Munich by Ann-Kathrin from AM Model Management in Dormagen. She debuted in the summer of 2011 and walked in the following S/S 2012 season. She walked 63 shows worldwide and broke the record by opening more than 12 of them in her first season. She has worked with brands including Chanel, Yves Saint Laurent, Dior, Givenchy and Jimmy Choo.

Nescher is now signed with [DNA Model Management] in New York City, Why Not Model Agency in Milan, and VIVA Model Management in London and Paris.

== Personal life ==
Nescher gave birth to her son in 2010.
