= Mark Abrahams (photographer) =

American fashion and portrait photographer

Mark Abrahams (born 1958) is an American fashion and portrait photographer known for his raw, black-and-white celebrity portraits. His work has been featured in Bazaar, Glamour, GQ, The New York Times Magazine, Vanity Fair, and Vogue.

== Early life ==
Born in Santa Ana, California, Abrahams discovered photography after receiving a Nikon FM camera. In the 1980s, he worked as a truck driver while developing film in a darkroom he set up at home. By the 1990s, he began photographing musicians and supermodels, with his work appearing in international editions of Vogue and GQ.

== Career ==
In 2015, he photographed Sharon Stone and Allison Williams for Harper's Bazaar. He has contributed over 630 editorial photographs featured in various fashion magazines and journals. He explains that in his portrait and editorial work, “The intent of it is to strip away all the norms and expectations and get to the heart of the matter."

His work has been exhibited internationally, including the Jaguar Summer Museum in Moscow in an exhibition "Two Colors".

== Publications ==
In 2011, Abrahams released a book of black-and-white portraits, Mark Abrahams, which was launched by Annie Lebovitz.
