= Edita Vilkevičiūtė =

Lithuanian model (born 1989)

- Born: 1 January 1989 (age 37); Kaunas, Lithuanian SSR, Soviet Union (now Lithuania)
- Spouse: Björn Frederic Gerling (m. 2017)
- Modeling information
- Height: 1.75 m (5 ft 9 in)
- Hair color: Blonde
- Eye color: Blue-green
- Agency: DNA Model Management (New York); VIVA Model Management (Paris, London, Barcelona); Why Not Model Management (Milan); Priscilla's Model Management (Sydney)

Edita Vilkevičiūtė (born 1 January 1989) is a Lithuanian model. Throughout her whole career, she has appeared in 25 Vogue covers. In 2015, she was one of the highest paid models in the world thanks to the frangrace ads for Roberto Cavalli and Viktor & Rolf.

== Early life ==
Vilkevičiūtė was born on New Year's Day in 1989. She has a younger sister who is an event planner, her father is a teacher, and her mother is a homemaker. Vilkevičiūtė described her childhood as "simple and perfect" with "a lot of nature around and forests." She learned instruments, played basketball, and rode horses.

== Career ==
Vilkevičiūtė was on holiday in Palanga when she was encouraged to enter a modeling contest organized by D-Max management, model agency in Vilnius . With her father's permission, she was first placed to a small agency in Spain, called "lagencia". The start was not great until she was noticed and signed by Women Management's Milan division at the age of 17 years, later, VIVA in Paris in 2006. Her runway debut was at Just Cavalli for the spring/summer 2006 shows in Milan. The following month, she featured in her first Vogue Paris editorial, shot by Katja Rahlwes, followed by another in February 2007 by Mark Segal.

She later walked for Paul Smith, Preen, and Marios Schwab in London. She made a comeback after not participating in fashion weeks at Milan and New York at the spring/summer 2008 Paris fashion week, walking for Shiatzy Chen, Balenciaga, Chanel, Dries van Noten, Miu Miu, and Louis Vuitton. In 2008 she was chosen for Dolce and Gabbana's Spring/Summer campaign, captured by Mario Testino. She featured prominently in the 2008 Versace Fragrance, Marc O'Polo, Giuseppe Zanotti and Eres Paris print campaigns. During Fall/Winter 2008–09, she opened and closed shows for Burberry and La Perla. In the same year she went on to succeed Angela Lindvall as the muse of Versace perfumes, and Karl Lagerfeld signed her up to play Coco Chanel in his film Chanel, The Silent Film. In late 2008, she participated in the Victoria's Secret Fashion Show 2008, in the "PINK" section.

She is the current face of Karl Lagerfeld, Gap in Japan, Dior Beauty and Emporio Armani. In the autumn/winter 2008 campaigns, Vilkevičiūtė replaced Hilary Rhoda as the face of clothing line Etro. She also did a campaign for Louis Vuitton's Mon Monogram range of personalised leather goods. Vilkevičiūtė has graced the pages of many fashion magazines around the world including covers for Marie Claire in August 2007 and May 2008, Vogue in Germany (August 2009) and Russia (May 2007), Numéro in September 2008, Allure, and i-D.

During the Spring/Summer 2009 season she walked over 35 runways for some of the world's top designers, such as Chloe, Shiatzy Chen, Chanel, Stella McCartney, Givenchy, Yves Saint Laurent, Zac Posen, and Dolce & Gabbana, and later participated in the Victoria's Secret Fashion Show 2009, in the sections "All Aboard" and "Enchanted Forest". In the same year, she appeared nude in a steamy photo shoot for Interview magazine with Zac Efron. Vilkeviciute's career made further progress, as she opened for Valentino Garavani in Paris. She was photographed by both Terry Richardson and Patrick Demarchelier as the face of Yves Saint Laurent cosmetics and Blumarine respectively. She met up with Demarchelier again, on an editorial featured in the March 2009 edition of Vogue Paris.

In 2010, Vilkevičiūtė appeared on the covers of the Numéro, Vogue Spain, Numéro Tokyo, Vogue Greece, Vogue Germany and Muse magazines. She also participated in the Victoria's Secret Fashion Show 2010, in the segments "Country Girls" (where she wore "Angel" wings for the first time) and "PINK Planet".

Took her own self-portrait for the new Rag & Bone Do-It-Yourself ad campaign spring 2011 along with models Sasha Pivovarova, Abbey Lee Kershaw, Candice Swanepoel, Karolína Kurková and Lily Aldridge. In August 2011, Vilkevičiūtė appeared on the cover of Numéro China. She turned down the chance to become a Victoria's Secret Angel in 2011, in preference of appearing on the runway for Versace's collaboration with H&M. She also fronted Patrizia Pepe's Autumn/Winter 2011–12 campaign.

As of 2012 Vilkeviciute is the model for Calvin Klein's new fragrance "Eternity Aqua for Her". She appeared in the 2012 Pirelli Calendar photographed by Mario Sorrenti.

In mid-2013 she became the new face of Bulgari Omnia Crystalline Fragrance and she appeared in the Fall campaign ads of Juicy Couture. She was also featured on the October 2013 cover of Vogue Paris and on the cover of the December 2013 edition of Lui France with an editorial entitled "Edita at the Beach". In 2014 she became the face for Viktor & Rolf 'Bonbon' Fragrance Campaign shot by Inez & Vinoodh .

In February 2014 she appeared in a Vogue Paris editorial, photographed by Katja Rahlwes. In November 2014 she was on the cover of Vogue Spain and the magazine 032C which fashion director is Rihanna's personal wardrobe stylist Mel Ottenberg. In this year she worked at editorials for Vogue China, Vogue Germany, W Magazine, Vogue Australia and many more. She made runway appearance during New York Fashion Week as exclusive for Versus x Anthony Vaccarello and for the Paris Fashion Week walking for Mugler, Isabel Marant, Balmain and Anthony Vaccarello . She keeps working with brands as H&M, Mango, Esprit, Next Uk, Massimo Dutti & Calvin Klein . In 2015 Edita has been chosen as the face of Juicy Couture's spring-summer 2015 advertisements. And she has signed on to do both print and TV ads for the new Cavalli fragrance, as part of a worldwide campaign with Jonas Akerlund as the film director and Mario Sorrenti as the print photographer. She will be the face of the new Roberto Cavalli fragrance for woman ‘Paradiso’, which will be revealed in February 2015. In Roberto Cavalli’s own words, she is "a supermodel of stunning beauty. She sums up the spirit of the fragrance and perfectly embodies the Paradiso woman, a bold and utterly feminine creature who irradiates her sophisticated glamour without being afraid to assert her natural seductiveness."

== Public image ==
Models.com ranks her on the "Industry Icons" list. In 2015, for the first year she joined the rankings as one of the highest paid models in the world by Forbes.

== Personal life ==
Vilkevičiūtė married Björn Frederic Gerling in July 2017.
