= Carolyn Murphy =

American model (born 1973)

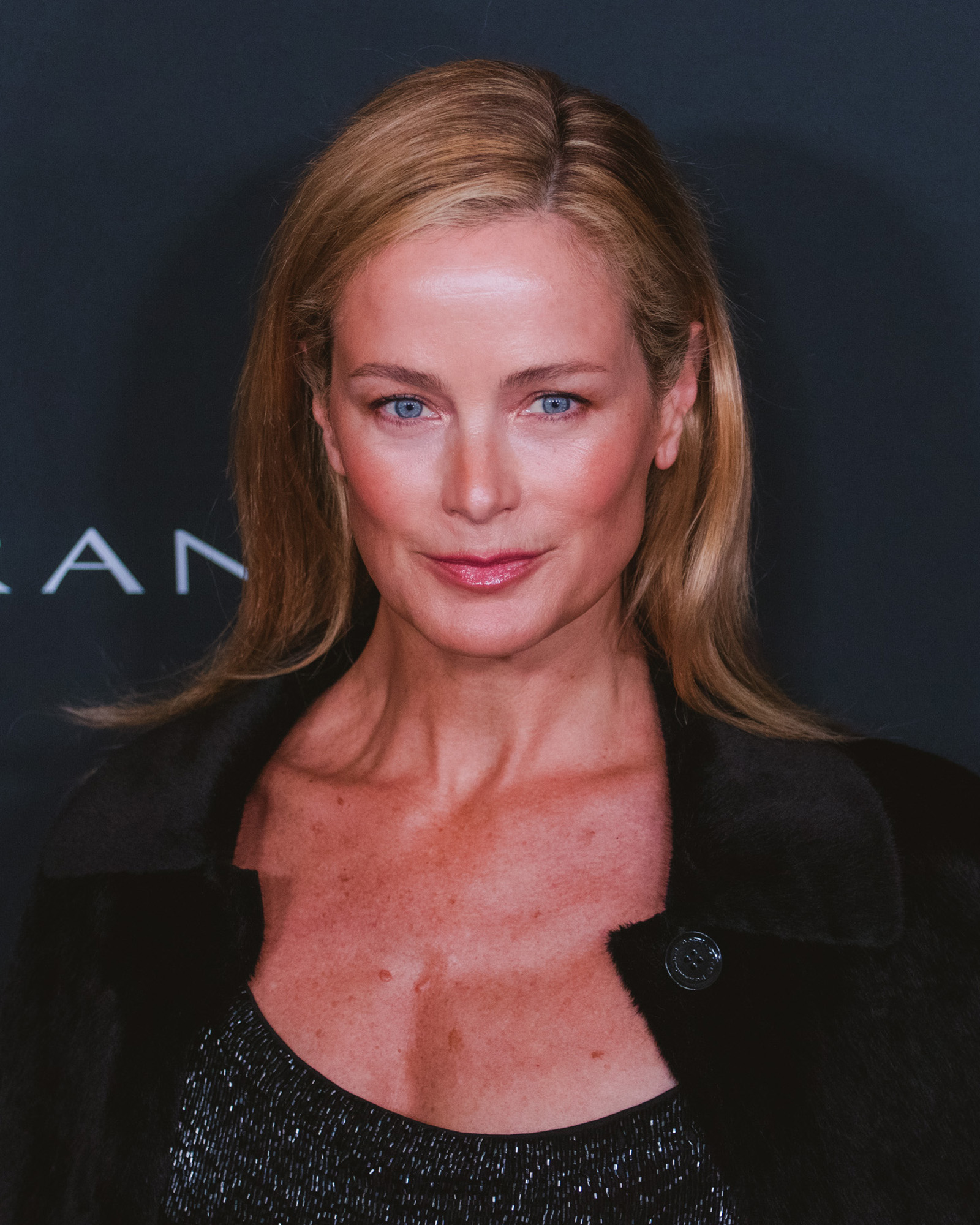
- Murphy in 2026
- Born: August 11, 1973 (age 53); Panama City, Florida, U.S.
- Occupation: Model
- Years active: 1990–present
- Spouse: Jake Schroeder (m. 1999; div. 2002)
- Modeling information
- Height: 5 ft 9 in (1.75 m)
- Hair color: Blonde
- Eye color: Blue
- Agency: IMG Models

Carolyn Murphy (born August 11, 1973) is an American model. Throughout her career, she has been on the cover of Vogue 73 times, making her one of the most featured models in the magazine's history.

== Early life ==
Carolyn Murphy was born on August 11, 1973 in Florida, and grew up between the Gulf Coast and her family's farm in Virginia.

Before Carolyn graduated from Fort Walton Beach High School in 1991, her mother enrolled her in a "finishing school" to combat her shyness. Murphy was discovered at the age of 15 at a modelling convention. However, reluctant to begin a career as a model, Carolyn instead moved back to Virginia to pursue her college studies, modelling part time.

== Career ==
=== Major contracts and campaigns ===
Carolyn Murphy signed her first major international contract with Prada in 1995, marking the beginning of her career as a world-renowned model. Over the years, she has shot campaigns for luxury brands such as DKNY, Tom Ford, Céline, Fendi, and Ralph Lauren.

Starting in 2001, Murphy became an ambassador for Estée Lauder, appearing in global advertising campaigns and maintaining a long-term contract considered one of the most lucrative in the history of the cosmetics industry.

=== Editorial work and photography ===
In addition to her campaigns, Murphy has been featured on the covers of prestigious magazines, including Vogue (U.S., France, and Italy), Harper’s Bazaar, Elle, Allure, Marie Claire, WSJ Magazine, and TIME. She has also worked with legendary photographers such as Irving Penn, Helmut Newton, and Peter Lindbergh, cementing her reputation in the world of fashion photography.

=== Documentary appearances and commercial collaborations ===
Murphy appeared in the documentary Mademoiselle C, which chronicles the career of Carine Roitfeld and the world of fashion, showcasing her involvement in the industry beyond the runway.

She also served as a design director for the brand Shinola, creating products such as the “Lois Tote” and collaborating on fashion and accessory collections.

=== Others ===
Beyond her modeling career, Murphy has engaged in environmental causes, creating sustainable products in partnership with the organization No More Plastic, focusing on ocean conservation.

Among other works, she has appeared in Vogue, Harper's Bazaar, and the Sports Illustrated Swimsuit Issue. Carolyn Murphy was ranked 5th on the list of the 20 Supermodel Icons published by the U.S.-based site Models.com.

In 1998, Murphy was named VH1/Vogue's Model of the Year. She played Dubbie in Barry Levinson's film Liberty Heights. She was one of the 'Modern Muses' on the November 1999 millennium cover of American Vogue and was chosen to represent Calvin Klein's perfume, Contradiction. She was featured on the cover of the Sports Illustrated Swimsuit Issue in 2005 and 2006.

Murphy has shot campaigns for Missoni, Versace and Tiffany & Co.

In July 2012, Murphy was hired to replace Angela Lindvall as host of Project Runway All Stars on Lifetime, after Rosie Huntington-Whiteley dropped out for a film project. In 2012, Murphy was ninth on the Forbes top-earning models list, estimated to have earned $3.5 million in one year.

== Personal life ==
Murphy was married to businessman Jake Schroeder, with whom she has a daughter, Dylan Blue, born in 2000. The couple divorced shortly after the birth of their daughter.

As of 2015, Murphy practices Transcendental Meditation. She was dating actor Will Arnett as of 2025 until they split up in 2026.
