= Kirsty Hume =

Scottish model

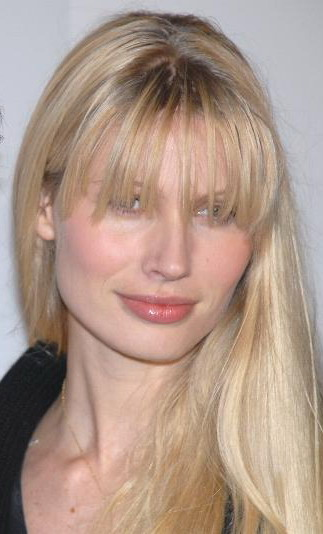
- Hume at Hollywood Life Magazine’s 7th Annual Breakthrough Awards, 9 December 2007.
- Born: 4 September 1976 (age 50); Ayrshire, Scotland
- Children: 1
- Modelling information
- Height: 1.80 m (5 ft 11 in)
- Hair colour: Blonde
- Eye colour: Blue
- Agency: DNA Model Management (New York); VIVA Model Management (Paris, London, Barcelona); LA Models (Los Angeles); MIKAs (Stockholm)

Kirsty Hume (born 4 September 1976) is a Scottish model. She rose to prominence in the 1990s as one of the leading models representing the heroin chic era, a more alternative and minimalist look that contrasted with the glamour of the supermodels of the late 1980s.

== Early life ==
Kirsty Hume was born in Ayrshire, Scotland, where she grew up in a rural environment and developed an interest in the arts, particularly painting. Initially, she intended to pursue a career in art and planned to attend art school.

She was discovered as a teenager by a modeling agency in Glasgow, around the age of 17, which led to the beginning of her career in fashion. Shortly thereafter, she signed with an agency in Paris and started working internationally.

== Modeling ==
Kirsty Hume rose to prominence in the 1990s after being discovered by photographer Patrick Demarchelier, which helped launch her international career. Her distinctive look and understated style made her one of the models associated with the minimalist aesthetic that characterized the decade.

In 1996 Hume was the feature model for Chanel ads. For the March 1996 Gucci presentation of fall and winter fashion collections in Milan.

Following a showing of Karl Lagerfeld designs for Chanel in 1997 in Paris, Hume was queried by a Russian TV reporter. He asked her what was the most exciting part of her job. She answered, "Um, the money."

She was featured on the covers of leading fashion magazines, including Vogue and Harper’s Bazaar, and became recognized as part of a new generation of models who emerged during a shift in the fashion industry.

After achieving early success, Hume stepped back from full-time modeling, particularly following the birth of her daughter, and later returned to the industry on a more selective basis, participating in editorial work and occasional runway appearances.

== Personal life ==
Hume attended Wellington School, Ayr. She has studied painting and paganism.

Hume married singer and actor Donovan Leitch in Scotland in 1997. Their daughter was born in 2004. Hume and Leitch eschewed city life and relocated to Woodstock, New York, but they separated in 2011 and divorced in 2014.

Hume married entrepreneur Frederick Schilling in 2022.

Her daughter is also a model. They appeared together in a 2018 American Vogue editorial.

== Appearances ==
Hume starred in an interactive fashion art film by Imagine Fashion called, "Decadent Control" with Roberto Cavalli and Eva Herzigová. The film features fashion from Agent Provocateur and H&M and premiered in March 2011.
