= Sante D'Orazio =

American photographer

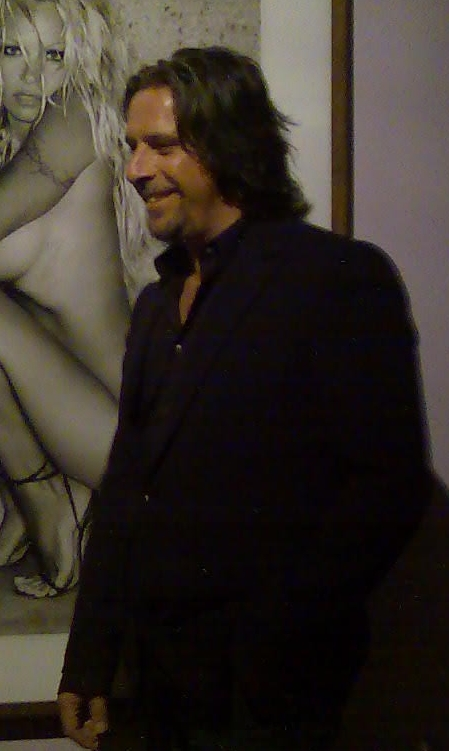
- D'Orazio at the Vienna exhibition of Pam: American Icon in 2006
- Born: January 23, 1956 (age 70); Brooklyn, New York, U.S.
- Occupation: Photographer
- Spouse: Kara Young (m. 1994–1998)
- Website: santedorazio.com

Sante D'Orazio (born January 23, 1956) is an American photographer. D'Orazio exhibited in the Kunsthaus Munich, Kunsthauswien Vienna, the L.A. County Museum, Kahmann Gallery (Amsterdam), Stellan Holm Gallery (New York), Cameraworks Gallery (Berlin) Hilario Galguera Gallery (Mexico City), and NRW Forum in Düsseldorf. His publications include: A Private View, Sante D'Orazio Photographs, Pam: American Icon, Katlick School, Gianni and Donatella, and Barely Private.

== Books ==
- A Private View. Penguin Books, 1998. ISBN 3-8296-0247-2. Photographs and diary pages covering his photography career.
- Sante D'Orazio Photographs. Arena Editions, 2000. Photographs from his professional and personal work.
- Pam: American Icon. Schirmer/Mosel, 2005. ISBN 978-2-930487-06-9. Photographs of Pamela Anderson
- Katlick School. teNeues, 2006.
- Gianni and Donatella. teNeues, 2007.
- Barely Private - A Diary Book 1997-Present. Taschen, 2009. ISBN 978-3-8365-1460-6

== Exhibitions ==
- 2010 Scratch This, Hiliario Galuera Gallery, Leipzig, Germany (solo) In Dialogue, Anonymous Gallery/Collective Hardware, New York, NY (catalog).
- 2009 Barely Private, Milk Gallery, New York, NY (solo) Scratch This / A Film, Paradise Row Gallery, Frieze Art Fair, London.
- 2008 Pam: American Icon, Alain Noirhomme Galerie, Belgium Double Cross, NRW Forum, Duesseldorf, Germany Gianni and Donatella, Orvieto, Italy Untitled, Hilario Gaguera Gallery, San Rafael, Mexico.
- 2007 Katlick School, Stellan Holm Gallery, New York, NY.
- 2006 Pam: American Icon, Kunsthausewien, Vienna, Austria.
- 2005 Pamela Anderson: Icon, Kunstaus, Munich, Germany Pamela Andersion: Icon, Stellan Holm Gallery, New York, NY.
- 2004 Pixels, Stellan Holm Gallery, New York, NY.
- 2003 Rolling Stones, Cameraworks Gallery, Berlin, Germany.

== Personal life ==
D'Orazio was married to fashion model Kara Young from 1994 to 1998. They had one son together, Nickola, also a photographer.

== Quotes ==
"Everybody has a different approach to it, but I always tell people: learn how to stop thinking. Once you start thinking with the camera in your hand, you’ve lost the picture. If you had time to think, the picture’s gone." – Sante D'Orazio, In a 2023 interview with The Trops
