= List of Elle Australia cover models =

This list of Elle Australia cover models (1990–2002; 2013–2020; 2024–present) is a catalog of cover models who have appeared on the cover of Elle Australia, the Australian edition of French lifestyle magazine Elle.

== 1990s ==
=== 1990 ===
Issue	Cover model	Photographer
March	Jenny Hayman	
April	Belinda Riding	
May	Claudia Schiffer	
June	Johanna Rhodes	
July	Kate Fischer	
August	Belinda Riding	
September	Jenny Hayman	Graham Shearer
October	Brighdie Grounds	Paul Westlake
November	Carmen Schwarz	
December	Linda Evangelista	

=== 1991 ===
Issue	Cover model	Photographer
January	Claudia Schiffer	
February	Jenny Hayman	
March	Jenny Hayman	
April	Linda Evangelista	
May		
June	Monica Bechthold	
July	Cindy Crawford	Tiziano Magni
August	Nicole Kidman	
September	Elle MacPherson	
October	Niki Taylor	
November	Cindy Crawford	
December	Linda Kozlowski	

=== 1992 ===
Issue	Cover model	Photographer
January	Elle MacPherson	
February	Rachel Hunter	
March	Elle MacPherson	
April	Rachel Hunter	
May	Jill Goodacre	Paul Westlake
June	Liskula Cohen	
July	Rebecca Romijn	
August		
September	Nadia Aldridge	
October	Estelle Lefebure	
November	Helena Christensen	
December	Emma Sjoberg	

=== 1993 ===
Issue	Cover model	Photographer
January	Eva Herzigová	
February	Elle MacPherson	
March		
April	Christy Turlington	
May	Kate James, Shayna Roberts, Sarah O‘Hare	
June	Niki Taylor	
July	Helena Christensen	
August	Sarah O'Hare	
September	Claudia Schiffer	
October	Sarah O'Hare	
November		
December	Anneliese Seubert	Warwick Orme

=== 1994 ===
Issue	Cover model	Photographer
January	Basia Milewicz	
February	Christy Turlington	
March	Daniela Pestova	
April	Kylie Minogue	
May	Rebecca Romijn	
June	Helena Christensen	
July	Claudia Schiffer	
August	Niki Taylor	Marc Hispard
September	Manon von Gerkan	
October	Helena Christensen	
November	Eva Herzigová	
December	Linda Evangelista	

=== 1995 ===
Issue	Cover model	Photographer
January	Carla Bruni	
February	Estelle Lefebure	
March	Nicole Kidman	
April	Helena Christensen	
May	Cecilia Chancellor	
June	Karen Mulder	
July	Kylie Minogue	
August	Karen Mulder	
September	Elle MacPherson	
October	Manon von Gerkan	
November	Carla Bruni	
December	Linda Evangelista	

=== 1996 ===
Issue	Cover model	Photographer
January	Valeria Mazza	
February	Meghan Douglas	
March	Karen Mulder	
April	Cindy Crawford	
May	Karen Mulder	
June	Helena Christensen	
July	Elle MacPherson	
August	Karen Mulder	
September	Tereza Maxová, Viola Haqi	
October	Diane Kruger, Kirsty Hume, Laetitia Casta, Mak Gilchrist	
November	Tereza Maxova	
December	Carla Bruni, Karen Mulder	

=== 1997 ===
Issue	Cover model	Photographer
January	Karen Ferrari	
February	Karen Ferrari	
March	Christy Turlington	
April	Niki Taylor	
May	Karen Mulder	
June	Christy Turlington	
July	Jodie Kidd	
August	Cindy Crawford	
September	Elsa Benitez	
October	Laetitia Casta	
November		
December	Laetitia Casta	

=== 1998 ===
Issue	Cover model	Photographer
January	Helena Christensen	
February	Sarah O'Hare	
March	Kate Menzies, Jasmine Taylor, Sarah O'Hare, Adele McLain, Jenny Hayman, Tanya Linney, Sara Philippidis, Kristy Hinze	
April	Christy Turlington	
May	Laetitia Casta	
June	Emma Balfour	
July	Inés Sastre	
August		
September	Cindy Crawford	
October	Jaime Rishar	
November	Georgina Grenville	
December	Kylie Minogue	

=== 1999 ===
Issue	Cover model	Photographer
January	Beri Smither	
February		
March	Elle MacPherson	
April	Laetitia Casta	
May	Tanga Moreau	
June		
July	Tanga Moreau	
August	Helena Christensen	
September	Sarah O'Hare	
October	Kirsty Hume	
November	Carmen Kass	
December	Georgina Grenville	

== 2000s ==
=== 2000 ===
Issue	Cover model	Photographer
January	Uma Thurman	
February	Alyssa Sutherland	
March		
April	Cindy Crawford	
May	Inés Rivero	
June	Alyssa Sutherland	
July	Eva Herzigová	
August	Laetitia Casta	
September	Yasmin Le Bon	
October	Penélope Cruz	
November	Claudia Schiffer	
December	Helena Christensen	

=== 2001 ===
Issue	Cover model	Photographer
January	Gwyneth Paltrow	
February	Sarah Jessica Parker	
March		
April	Inés Sastre	
May	Uma Thurman	
June		
July		
August	Gisele Bündchen	Gilles Bensimon
September		
October	Kylie Minogue	
November		
December	Jennifer Aniston	

=== 2002 ===
Issue	Cover model	Photographer
January		
February	Bridget Hall	
March	Angela Lindvall	

== 2010s ==
=== 2013 ===
Issue	Cover model	Photographer
October	Gabby Westbrook-Patrick	Derek Henderson
November	Natalie Portman	Kai Z. Feng
December	Erin Wasson	David Mandelberg

=== 2014 ===
Issue	Cover model	Photographer
January	Bambi Northwood-Blyth	Ben Morris
February	Drew Barrymore	Diego Uchitel
March	Margot Robbie	Kai Z. Feng
April	Emma Watson	Carter Smith
May	Rose Byrne	Ben Morris
June	Angelina Jolie	Hedi Slimane
July	Nicole Richie	Justin Coit
August	Lara Bingle	Patric Shaw
September	Gisele Bündchen	Matt Jones
October	Olivia Palermo	Liz Ham
November	Miranda Kerr	Patric Shaw
December	Emma Watson	Kerry Hallihan

=== 2015 ===
Issue	Cover model	Photographer
January	Jessica Mauboy	Pierre Toussaint
February	Sienna Miller	Marvin Scott Jarrett
March	Phoebe Tonkin	Beau Grealy
April	Rebel Wilson	David Burton
May	Kim Kardashian	Jan Welters
June	Nicole Trunfio	Georges Antoni
July	Nicole Warne	Mario Sierra
August	Taylor Swift	Michael Thompson
September	Jennifer Hawkins	Stefania Paparelli
October	—N/a	—N/a
November	Jessica Hart, Mick Fanning	Simon Upton
December	Keira Knightley	Paola Kudacki

=== 2016 ===
Issue	Cover model	Photographer
January	Jessica Marais	Simon Upton
February	Teresa Palmer	Derek Henderson
March	Kylie Jenner	Jan Welters
April	Karlie Kloss	Kai Z. Feng
May	Beyoncé	Paola Kudacki
June	Rosie Huntington-Whiteley, Lily Aldridge	Simon Upton
July	Gemma Ward	Georges Antoni
August	Blake Lively	Nico Bustos
September	Kristen Stewart	Matt Jones
October	Isla Fisher	Christopher Ferguson
November	Elle Macpherson	Gilles Bensimon
December	Zoë Foster Blake	Georges Antoni

=== 2017 ===
Issue	Cover model	Photographer
January	Chrissy Teigen	Mike Rosenthal
February	Gwyneth Paltrow	Xavi Gordo
March	Reese Witherspoon	Alexi Lubomirski
April	Pia Miller	Simon Upton
May	Jessica Alba	Mike Rosenthal
June	Margaret Zhang	Georges Antoni
July	Phoebe Tonkin	Darren McDonald
August	Lara Bingle	Darren McDonald
September	Emilia Clarke	Alexi Lubomirski
October	Cara Delevingne	Kai Z. Feng
November	Jessica Marais	Jennifer Stenglein
December	Tessa James	Simon Upton

=== 2018 ===
Issue	Cover model	Photographer
January	Daisy Ridley	Liz Collins
February	Elsa Pataky	Georges Antoni
March	Zoë Kravitz	Paola Kudacki
April	Alicia Vikander	Norman Jean Roy
May	Amy Shark	Simon Upton
May	Danielle Macdonald	Simon Upton
May	Darcy Vescio	Simon Upton
May	Katherine Langford	Simon Upton
May	Victoria Lee	Simon Upton
June/July	Emily Ratajkowski	Kai Z. Feng
August	Jenna Dewan	Mike Rosenthal
September	Emma Stone	Ben Hassett
October	Jennifer Lawrence	Mark Seliger
November	Hailey Baldwin	Michael Sanders
December	Mandy Moore	Kai Z. Feng

=== 2019 ===
Issue	Cover model	Photographer
January/February	Lara Bingle	Darren McDonald
March	Rosie Huntington-Whiteley	Simon Upton
April	Emilia Clarke	Carter Smith
May	Margot Robbie	Liz Collins
June/July	Michelle Williams	Mariana Maltoni
August	Yvonne Strahovski	Kerry Hallihan
September	Natasha Liu Bordizzo	Sylvè Colless
October	Nicole Trunfio	Max Doyle
November	Elle Fanning	Kai Z. Feng
December	Halsey	Kai Z. Feng

== 2020s ==
=== 2020 ===
Issue	Cover model	Photographer
January/February	Gwyneth Paltrow	Zoey Grossman
March	Phoebe Tonkin	Georges Antoni
April	Teresa Palmer	Max Doyle
May	Liz Cambage	Hannah Scott-Stevenson
June/July	Georgia Fowler	Nicole Bentley

=== 2024 ===
Issue	Cover model	Photographer
March	Sophie Wilde	Jordan Malane
September	Anya Taylor-Joy	Pamela Hanson

=== 2025 ===
Issue	Cover model	Photographer
March	Alycia Debnam-Carey	Nicole Bentley
June	Milly Alcock	Holly Gibson
September	Anna Robinson	Pierre Toussaint
December	Sadie Sink	Philip Gay

=== 2026 ===
Issue	Cover model	Photographer
January	Jessie Buckley	Nathaniel Goldberg
March	Sunday Rose	Hannah Scott-Stevenson
June	Simone Ashley	David Roemer
September	Latahlia Hickling	Conrad Aleksander
December	Maya Hawke	Philip Gay
