= List of Elle Portugal cover models =

This list of Elle Portugal cover models (1988–2021) is a catalog of cover models who have appeared on the cover of Elle Portugal, the Portuguese edition of French lifestyle magazine Elle.

== 2012 ==
Issue	Cover model	Photographer
January	Carmen Kass	Pascal Chevallier
February	Jennifer Aniston	Alexei Hay
March	Isabeli Fontana	Thomas Schenk
April	Alexa Chung	Thomas Schenk
May	Dakota Fanning	David Slijper
June	Heidi Harrington-Johnson	Katerina Tsatsanis
July	Lien Vieira	Mário Principe
August	Sara Sampaio	Xavi Gordo
September	Katie Holmes	Carter Smith
October	Valentina Zelyaeva	Joshua Jordan
November	Rianne ten Haken	Horst Diekgerdes
December	Jennifer Muller	Mário Principe

== 2013 ==
Issue	Cover model	Photographer
January	Blake Lively	
February	Cameron Diaz	David Slijper
March	Jessica Biel	Thomas Whiteside
April	Beegee Margenyte	David Vasiljevic
May	Rianne ten Haken	Xavi Gordo
June	Karolína Kurková	Branislav Šimončík
July	Helena Christensen	Xavi Gordo
August	Elena Baguci	Riccardo Tinelli
September	Jessica Miller	Thomas Whiteside
October	Sara Sampaio	Juan Aldabaldetrecu
November	Elena Melnik	Nicole Heiniger
December	Doutzen Kroes	Andreas Sjödin

== 2014 ==
Issue	Cover model	Photographer
January	Natalie Portman	Kai Z. Feng
February	Naty Chabanenko	Kal Griffig
March	Marloes Horst	Matt Jones
April	Sheila Márquez	Txema Yeste
May	Angela Lindvall	Xavi Gordo
June	Aline Weber	Ben Watts
July	Gisele Bündchen	Matt Jones
August	Keira Knightley	Thomas Whiteside
September	Svala Lind	Gonçalo Claro
October	Sharam Diniz	Mário Principe
November	Jennifer Lopez	Txema Yeste
December	Anne Hathaway	Kai Z. Feng

== 2015 ==
Issue	Cover model	Photographer
January	Coco Rocha	Benoit Peverelli
February	Ava Smith	Kal Griffig
March	Rosie Huntington-Whiteley	Kai Z. Feng
April	Bianca Balti	Mark Pillai
May	Bar Refaeli	Xavi Gordo
June	Chloe Lloyd	Mário Principe
July	Michelle Buswell	Xavi Gordo
August	Charlize Theron	Bjarne Jonasson
September	Luma Grothe	Ben Morris
October	Daniela Hanganu	Mário Principe
November	Olivia Palermo	Johannes Huebl
December	Keira Knightley	Paola Kudacki

== 2016 ==
Issue	Cover model	Photographer
January	Cristina Tosio	Mario Sierra
February	Alexa Chung	Matt Irwin
March	Anna Lund Sørensen	Mark Pillai
April	Angela Ruiz	Mário Principe
May	Karlie Kloss	Kai Z. Feng
June	Vika Falileeva	Mário Principe
July	Sara Sampaio	Gilles Bensimon
August	Bregje Heinen	Mario Sierra
September	Daga Ziober	Marcin Tyszka
October	Kristen Stewart	Matt Jones
November	Enikő Mihalik	Xavi Gordo
December	Sara Matos	Frederico Martins

== 2017 ==
Issue	Cover model	Photographer
January	Lily James	Kai Z. Feng
February	Lauren Auerbach	Xavi Gordo
March	Gwyneth Paltrow	Xavi Gordo
April	Emma Watson	Kerry Hallihan
May	Bar Refaeli	Xavi Gordo
June	Olivia Palermo	Mario Sierra
July	Elsa Pataky	Xavi Gordo
August	Karmen Pedaru	Xavi Gordo
September	Miranda Kerr	Greg Kadel
October	Rihanna	Sølve Sundsbø
November	Shlomit Malka	Mario Sierra
December	Julia Roberts	Tom Munro

== 2018 ==
Issue	Cover model	Photographer
January	Shanina Shaik	Xavi Gordo
February	Jessica Chastain	Max Abadian
March	Hailey Baldwin	Nino Muñoz
April	Estelle Yves	Alexei Hay
May	Alexa Chung	David Burton
June	Sara Carbonero	Rafa Gallar
July	Charlize Theron	Mario Sorrenti
August	Isabeli Fontana	Xavi Gordo
September	Hannah Ferguson	Terry Tsiolis
October	Claudia Schiffer	Ellen von Unwerth
November	Chiara Ferragni	Riccardo Tinelli
December	Lady Gaga	Ruth Hogben & Andrea Gelardin

== 2019 ==
Issue	Cover model	Photographer
January	Clémentine Balcaen	Craig McDean
February	Cato van Ee	Gilles Bensimon
March	Emilia Clarke	Carter Smith
April	Margot Robbie	Liz Collins
May	Michelle Williams	Mariana Maltoni
June	Taylor Swift	Quentin Jones
July	Shannan Click	Mario Sierra
August	Gisele Bündchen	Nino Muñoz
September	Miley Cyrus	Mario Sorrenti
October	Angelina Jolie	Alexi Lubomirski
November	Cara Delevingne	Liz Collins
December	Gwyneth Paltrow	Zoey Grossman

== 2020 ==
Issue	Cover model	Photographer
January	Lady Gaga	Sølve Sundsbø
February	Zendaya	Zoey Grossman
March	Elle Fanning	Kai Z. Feng
April	Zoë Kravitz	Paola Kudacki
May	Natalia Vodianova	Gilles Bensimon
June/July	Miranda Kerr	Nino Muñoz
August/September	Alessandra Ambrosio	Mario Sierra
October	Rosalía	Zoey Grossman
November	Alicia Vikander	Hans Feurer
December	Toni Garrn	Javier López

== 2021 ==
The magazine permanently ceased publication and shut down its operation, with its final issue published in February 2021.

Issue	Cover model	Photographer
January	Marion Cotillard	Louie Banks
February	Ester Expósito	Rafa Gallar
March		
April		
May		
June		
July		
August		
September		
October		
November		
December		
