= List of Marie Claire Australia cover models =

This list of Marie Claire Australia cover models (1995–present) is a catalog of cover models who have appeared on the cover of Marie Claire Australia, the Australian edition of French lifestyle magazine Marie Claire.

== 2010s ==
=== 2010 ===
Issue	Cover model	Photographer
January	Kate Hudson	
February	Jennifer Hawkins	
March	Angelina Jolie	
April	Victoria Beckham	
May	Drew Barrymore	
June	Jennifer Aniston	
July	Sarah Jessica Parker	
August	Jennifer Lopez	
September	Kylie Minogue	
October	Kristen Stewart	
November	Julia Roberts	
December	Blake Lively	

=== 2011 ===
Issue	Cover model	Photographer
January	Elle Macpherson	
February	Dannii Minogue	
March	Drew Barrymore	
April	Kylie Minogue	
May	Jennifer Aniston	
June	Kate Hudson	
July	Megan Gale	
August	Kim Kardashian	
September	Keira Knightley	
October	Jennifer Aniston	
November	Kate Moss	
December	Sarah Jessica Parker	

=== 2012 ===
Issue	Cover model	Photographer
January	Cameron Diaz	
February	Reese Witherspoon	
March	Angelina Jolie	
April	Claudia Schiffer	
May	Jennifer Aniston	
June	Dannii Minogue	
July	Rachael Taylor	
August	Gwen Stefani	
September	Blake Lively	
October	Miranda Kerr	
November	Jennifer Aniston	
December	Victoria Beckham	

=== 2013 ===
Issue	Cover model	Photographer
January	Kristen Stewart	
February	Keira Knightley	
March	Emma Watson	
April	Emily VanCamp	
May	Emma Stone	
June	Miranda Kerr	
July	Katie Holmes	
August	Scarlett Johansson	
September	Pink	
October	Gwyneth Paltrow	
November	Beyoncé	
December	Katy Perry	

=== 2014 ===
Issue	Cover model	Photographer
January	Jennifer Lawrence	Alasdair McLellan
February	Jessica Alba	Simon Emmett
March	Christy Turlington	Daniel Jackson
April	Drew Barrymore	Jan Welters
May	Megan Gale	David Gubert
June	Kristen Stewart	Tesh
July	Angelina Jolie	Patrick Demarchelier
August	Keira Knightley	Nathaniel Goldberg
September	Jessica Alba	
October	Lena Dunham	Tom Munro
November	Robyn Lawley	David Gubert
December	Cameron Diaz	Michael Thompson

=== 2015 ===
Issue>	Cover model	Photographer
January	Jennifer Aniston	Alexei Hay
February	Jessica Mauboy	David Gubert
March	Gwyneth Paltrow	Jan Welters
April	Angelina Jolie	Art Streiber
May	Kate Hudson	Alexi Lubomirski
June	Blake Lively	Guy Aroch
July	Reese Witherspoon	Matt Irwin
August	Emma Stone	Matthias Vriens-McGrath
September	Gisele Bündchen	Terry Richardson
October	Drew Barrymore	Daniel Jackson
November	Sienna Miller	Txema Yeste
December	Jennifer Lawrence	Sebastian Kim

=== 2016 ===
Issue	Cover model	Photographer
January	Robyn Lawley	David Gubert
February	Jennifer Lopez	Joe Pugliese
March	Lily James	Simon Emmett
April	Nicole Kidman	Greg Kadel
May	Gwyneth Paltrow	Daniel Jackson
June	Pia Miller	David Gubert
July	Drew Barrymore	David Slijper
August	Ruby Rose	David Gubert
September	Jennifer Hawkins & Megan Gale	David Gubert
October	Blake Lively	Beau Grealy
November	Kate Hudson	Tesh
December	Lara Worthington	Simon Upton

=== 2017 ===
Issue	Cover model	Photographer
January	Jennifer Aniston	Michelangelo Di Battista
February	Emma Stone	Craig McDean
March	Sarah Jessica Parker	Michelangelo Di Battista
April	Scarlett Johansson	Tesh
May	Emma Watson	Kerry Hallihan
June	Jessica Marais	Simon Upton
July	Gal Gadot	Tesh
August	Asher Keddie	Georges Antoni
September	Sienna Miller	Cass Bird
October	Emma Stone	Greg Kadel
November	Julianne Moore	David Roemer
December	Mila Kunis	Kai Z. Feng

=== 2018 ===
Issue	Cover model	Photographer
January	Chrissy Teigen	Michelangelo Di Battista
February	Jessica Biel	Txema Yeste
March	Jesinta & Buddy Franklin	Georges Antoni
April	Reese Witherspoon	Thomas Whiteside
May	Claire Foy	Matthew Brookes
June	Carrie Bickmore	Justin Ridler
July	Isla Fisher	Simon Upton
August	Lily James	Kerry Hallihan
September	Amy Adams	Liz Collins
October	Jennifer Lawrence	Emma Summerton
November	Asher Keddie	Simon Upton
December	Nicole Kidman	Victor Demarchelier

=== 2019 ===
Issue	Cover model	Photographer
January	Miranda Kerr	Nino Muñoz
February	Gwyneth Paltrow	Tesh
March	Kylie Minogue	Paul Bellaart
April	Drew Barrymore	Jamie Nelson
May	Natalie Portman	Camilla Armbrust
June	Sophie Turner	John Russo
July	Charlize Theron	Thomas Whiteside
August	Julia Roberts	Alexi Lubomirski
September	Cara Delevingne	Jean-Baptiste Mondino
October	Miranda Kerr	
November	Robyn Lawley	
December	Jennifer Aniston	

== 2020s ==
=== 2020 ===
Issue	Cover model	Photographer
January	Jennifer Lopez	
February	Samantha Harris, Jessica Mauboy, Miranda Tapsell	
March	Elyse Knowles	
April	Emily Blunt	
May	Jennifer Hawkins, Frankie Violet Hawkins Wall	
June	Elle Fanning	
July	Asher Keddie	
August	Lizzo	
September	Delta Goodrem	
October	Chrissy Teigen	
November	Nicole Kidman	
December	Scarlett Johansson	

=== 2021 ===
Issue	Cover model	Photographer
January	Jodie Comer	
February	Lara Worthington	
March	Vanessa Kirby	
April	Jessica Mauboy	
May	Grace Tame	
June	Isla Fisher	
July	Rose Byrne	
August	Jesinta Franklin, Rocky Franklin	
September	Nicole Kidman	
October	Jennifer Aniston	
November	Miranda Kerr	
December	Brittany Higgins, Grace Tame	

=== 2022 ===
Issue	Cover model	Photographer
January	Delta Goodrem	
February	Kristen Stewart	
March	Julia Garner	
April	Amanda Seyfried	
May	Miranda Tapsell, Grace Birri-Pa Purnarrika Colley	
June	Elsa Pataky	
July	Jennifer Connelly	
August	Daisy Edgar-Jones	
September	Dakota Johnson	
October	Elle Fanning	
November	Julia Roberts	
December	Amy Shark	

=== 2023 ===
Issue	Cover model	Photographer
January	Lily Collins	
February	Celeste Barber	
March	Pink	
April	Lara Worthington	
May	Priyanka Chopra Jones	
June	Sarah Snook	
July	Teresa Palmer	
August	Sigourney Weaver	
September	Chloé Hayden	
October	Charlize Theron	
November	Asher Keddie	
December	Mary Fowler	

=== 2024 ===
Issue	Cover model	Photographer
January	Sydney Sweeney	
February	Naomi Watts	
March	Julia Roberts	
April	Natalie Portman	
May	Kirsten Dunst	
June	Nicola Coughlan	
July	Elizabeth Debicki	
August	Lupita Nyong'o	
September	Celeste Barber	
October	Gillian Anderson	
November	Missy Higgins	
December	Alexa Leary, Nina Kennedy, Saya Sakakibara, Ariarne Titmus, Jessica Fox	

=== 2025 ===
Issue	Cover model	Photographer
January	Julia Garner	
February	Nicole Kidman	
March	Renée Zellweger	
April	Meghann Fahy	
May	Asher Keddie	
June	Jodie Comer	
July	Rachel Brosnahan	
August	Delta Goodrem	
September	Celeste Barber	
October	Jessica Chastain	
November	Leslie Bibb	
December	Rose Byrne	

=== 2026 ===
Issue	Cover model	Photographer
January	Megan Gale	
February	Pia Whitesell	
March	Jennifer Garner	
April	Miranda Kerr	
May	Sarah Pidgeon	
June	Asher Keddie	
July	Jennifer Aniston	
August	Hannah Waddingham	
