= List of Marie Claire cover models =

Marie Claire is a women's fashion magazine published by Future US and formerly by Hearst Magazines, a division of Hearst Communications. Each month's issue typically features a famous woman, such as an actress, singer, or model, on the cover.

== 2010 ==
Issue	Cover model	Photographer
January	Natalie Portman	Peggy Sirota
February	Christina Aguilera	Peggy Sirota
March	Jennifer Garner & Jessica Biel	James White
April	Heidi Klum	Mark Abrahams
May	Jessica Simpson	James White
June	Sarah Jessica Parker	James White
July	Taylor Swift	Mark Abrahams
August	Dakota Fanning	Tesh
September	Mary-Kate Olsen	Tesh
October	Katie Holmes	Mark Abrahams
November	Victoria Beckham	Ruvén Afanador
December	Emma Watson	Tesh

== 2011 ==
Issue	Cover model	Photographer
January	Amy Adams	Mark Abrahams
February	Michelle Williams	Tesh
March	Miley Cyrus	Tesh
April	Abbie Cornish & Bradley Cooper	Peggy Sirota
May	Amber Riley; Dianna Agron; Lea Michele	Mark Abrahams
June	Ginnifer Goodwin & Kate Hudson	Tesh
July	Jennifer Aniston	Tesh
August	Olivia Wilde	Tesh
September	Sarah Jessica Parker	Tesh
October	Reese Witherspoon	Tesh
November	Katie Holmes	Tesh
December	Kim Kardashian	Tesh

== 2012 ==
Issue	Cover model	Photographer
January	Angelina Jolie	Alexei Hay
February	Christina Aguilera	Tesh
March	Eva Mendes	Txema Yeste
April	Leighton Meester	Tesh
May	Zooey Deschanel	Tesh
June	Jessica Alba	Tesh
July	Blake Lively	Txema Yeste
August	Kristen Wiig	Tesh
September	Miley Cyrus	Tesh
October	Gwen Stefani	Peggy Sirota
November	Ashley Greene	Tesh
December	Jessica Chastain	Tesh

== 2013 ==
Issue	Cover model	Photographer
January	Lea Michele	Andreas Sjödin
February	Heidi Klum	Tesh
March	Keira Knightley	Nathaniel Goldberg
April	Olivia Wilde	Tesh
May	Scarlett Johansson	Txema Yeste
June	Carrie Underwood	Regan Cameron
July	Lauren Conrad	Regan Cameron
August	Nicki Minaj	Satoshi Saïkusa
September	Zooey Deschanel	Tesh
October	Vanessa Hudgens	Tesh
November	Natalie Portman	Tesh
December	Julia Roberts	Cedric Buchet

== 2014 ==
Issue	Cover model	Photographer
January	Katy Perry	Regan Cameron
February	Drew Barrymore	Jan Welters
March	Kristen Stewart	Tesh
April	Shailene Woodley	Jan Welters
May	Elle Fanning; Elizabeth Olsen; Emilia Clarke; Kate Mara; Lupita Nyong'o	Cedric Buchet
June	Jennifer Lawrence	Jan Welters
July	Mila Kunis	Tesh
August	Zoe Saldaña	Boe Marion
September	Blake Lively	Guy Aroch
October	Ariana Grande	Tesh
November	Cameron Diaz	Michael Thompson
December	Anna Kendrick	Tesh

== 2015 ==
Issue	Cover model	Photographer
January	Miranda Lambert	Boe Marion
February	Gwyneth Paltrow	Jan Welters
March	Margot Robbie	Beau Grealy
April	Kerry Washington	Tesh
May	Felicity Jones; Hailee Steinfeld; Iggy Azalea; Kate Upton; Zoë Kravitz	Dan Martensen
June	Rachel McAdams	Jen Welters
July	Rita Ora	Beau Grealy
August	Kristen Stewart	Tesh
September	Miley Cyrus	Mark Seliger
October	Sienna Miller	Txema Yeste
November	Lea Michele	Boe Marion
December	Amber Heard	Boe Marion

== 2016 ==
Issue	Cover model	Photographer
January	Bella Heathcote; Lily James; Suki Waterhouse	Simon Emmett
February	Chloë Grace Moretz	Tesh
March	Dakota Johnson	Txema Yeste
April	Drew Barrymore	David Slijper
May	Ellie Goulding; Gugu Mbatha-Raw; Hailey Baldwin; Kylie Jenner; Zendaya	Dan Martensen
June	Selena Gomez	Kai Z. Feng
July	Blake Lively	Beau Grealy
August	Amy Schumer	Mark Seliger
September	Sarah Jessica Parker	Michelangelo Di Battista
October	Kate Hudson	Tesh
November	Nicki Minaj	Kai Z. Feng
December	Jennifer Aniston	Michelangelo Di Battista

== 2017 ==
Issue	Cover model	Photographer
January	Gina Rodriguez	Jan Welters
February	Claire Danes	Txema Yeste
March	Scarlett Johansson	Tesh
April	Priyanka Chopra	Tesh
May	Aja Naomi King; Alexandra Daddario; Emily Ratajkowski; Janelle Monáe; Zoey Deutch	Nicolas Moore
June	Gal Gadot	Tesh
July	Chrissy Teigen	Michelangelo Di Battista
August	Jessica Biel	Txema Yeste
September	Emma Stone	Greg Kadel
October	Taraji P. Henson; Melissa Benoist	Nicolas Moore; Hudson Taylor
November	Mila Kunis	Kai Z. Feng
December/January	Gwen Stefani	Kai Z. Feng

== 2018 ==
Issue	Cover model	Photographer
February	Hailee Steinfeld	Kai Z. Feng
March	Reese Witherspoon	Thomas Whiteside
April	Alicia Vikander	Thomas Whiteside
May	Issa Rae; Katherine Langford; Riley Keough; Sophie Turner; Yara Shahidi	Erik Madigan Heck
June	Emily Ratajkowski	Thomas Whiteside
July	Amy Adams	Brigitte Lacombe
August	Halsey	Mark Seliger
September	Zendaya	Thomas Whiteside
October	Nicole Kidman	Thomas Whiteside
November	Kerry Washington	Thomas Whiteside
December/January	Camila Cabello	Sofia Sanchez & Mauro Mongiello

== 2019 ==
Issue	Cover model	Photographer
February	Penélope Cruz	Nico Bustos
March	Lupita Nyong'o	Daria Kobayashi Ritch
April	Ava DuVernay; Jessica Chastain; Constance Wu	Amanda Demme
May	Elisabeth Moss; Sandra Oh; Thandie Newton	Thomas Whiteside
June	Charlize Theron	Thomas Whiteside
July	Tessa Thompson	Thomas Whiteside
August	Missy Elliott	Micaiah Carter
September	Cara Delevingne	Thomas Whiteside
October	Megan Rapinoe; Kacey Musgraves; Awkwafina; Lilly Singh	Thomas Whiteside
November	Regina King	Thomas Whiteside
December/January	Daisy Ridley	Nicole Nodland

== 2020 ==
Issue	Cover model	Photographer
February	Elle Fanning	Thomas Whiteside
March	Emily Blunt	Denise Hewitt; Lucci Mia; Genesis Gil
April	Gisele Bündchen	Nino Muñoz
May	Megan Thee Stallion	Micaiah Carter
June/July	Dakota Johnson	Steven Pan
August	Janet Mock	Luke Gilford
Fall	Chrissy Teigen	Lauren Dukoff
October	Gabrielle Union	Djeneba Aduayom

== 2021 ==
Issue	Cover model	Photographer
Spring	Priyanka Chopra Jonas	Ruth Ossai
April	Stacey Abrams	AB&DM
Summer	Tracee Ellis Ross	Christine Hahn
November	Alicia Keys	Yu Tsai

== 2022 ==
Issue	Cover model	Photographer
Winter	Jenny Slate	Ramona Rosales
May	Amanda Seyfried	Victoria Will
August	Mindy Kaling	Kanya Iwana
November	Carey Mulligan, Zoe Kazan, Jodi Kantor, and Megan Twohey	Lauren Dukoff
December	Jessica Chastain	Jessica Chou

== See also ==
- List of Marie Claire Australia cover models
