= Meghan Douglas =

American fashion model (born 1970)

- Born: Meghan Kelley Douglas; January 28, 1970 (age 56); Alexandria, Virginia, U.S.
- Occupation: Model
- Years active: 1988–2000s
- Spouse: Liam Dalton (m. 1993)
- Children: 4
- Modeling information
- Height: 5 ft 10 in (1.78 m)
- Hair color: Light brown
- Eye color: Blue
- Agency: Elite Model Management; Model Management – Hamburg

Meghan Kelley Douglas is an American former fashion model who rose to prominence in the early 1990s. She appeared in international editions of Elle, Harper's Bazaar, and Vogue, and in campaigns for Cover Girl, Dolce & Gabbana, Finesse Shampoo, Louis Vuitton, Michael Kors, Oscar de la Renta, Prada, and Versace. She is among the few models to have appeared on the covers of all "Big Four" international editions of Vogue: American, British, French, and Italian.

== Early life ==
Douglas was born on January 28, 1970, in Alexandria, Virginia, and raised in nearby Vienna. The daughter of a diplomat, she spent her early childhood overseas before returning to the United States around age nine. She attended James Madison High School in Vienna. As a teenager, she worked at a doughnut shop and answered phones at Bloomingdale's.

== Career ==
After being rejected by her first-choice college, Douglas began her modeling career in 1988 as a finalist in Elite Model Management's Look of the Year contest.

Early in her runway career, Douglas struggled with stage fright, which she overcame over time. She trained under runway coach J. Alexander. Douglas preferred exercise to dieting to maintain her figure.

In 1992, The New York Times profiled her as one of fashion's "supermodels-in-waiting," alongside Nadja Auermann and Eva Herzigova. A year later, Newsweek named her one of modeling's rising "new superstars," citing a shift in the industry that included Kate Moss. She reportedly earned $15,000 a day that year (equivalent to $33,000 in 2025).

Douglas frequently changed her look through hair color and styling. In 1995, on the advice of Steven Meisel, she went red, which raised her visibility; she was named "one of a hot new bunch of redheaded celebrities." She was cited as one of the highest-paid runway models for New York Fashion Week, alongside Elle Macpherson and Naomi Campbell, and was named by GQ as the "star attraction" of Paris Fashion Week.

She appeared in the 1995 fashion documentaries Catwalk and Unzipped, and is referenced in Michael Gross's exposé Model: The Ugly Business of Beautiful Women and in Bret Easton Ellis's fashion satire Glamorama.

== Personal life ==
In 1993, Douglas married financier Liam Dalton. The couple appeared in the October 1994 issue of American Vogue in an editorial titled "The Weekenders". Their first child, Kelley Rain, was born in October 1995 and appeared with Douglas in fashion editorials, including the December 1998 issue of Vogue. Douglas has four children; her two younger sons, Lander and Cade, are also models.

Douglas is Irish Catholic.

== Filmography ==
- Catwalk (1995)
- Unzipped (1995)

== See also ==
- The Big Four (Vogue)
- List of Vogue (US) cover models
- List of Vogue España cover models
- List of Vogue France cover models
- List of Vogue Australia cover models
- List of Vogue Italia cover models
- List of British Vogue cover models
- List of Elle (Australia) cover models
- List of Harper's Bazaar US cover models
- List of Harper's Bazaar UK cover models
- List of L'Officiel cover models
- List of Allure cover models
