= Catwalk (film) =

1995 American documentary film

- Theatrical release poster
- Directed by: Robert Leacock
- Produced by: Sug Villa
- Starring: Christy Turlington
- Cinematography: Robert Leacock
- Edited by: Milton Moses Ginsberg
- Music by: Leigh Gorman; Malcolm McLaren
- Distributed by: Arrow Video
- Release date: December 8, 1995 (IDFA)
- Running time: 93 minutes
- Country: United States
- Language: English
- Box office: $28,672

Catwalk is a 1995 American documentary film by Robert Leacock, following model Christy Turlington during Spring Fashion Week in Milan, Paris and New York City. Despite being filmed in 1993, it premiered in 1995.

== Synopsis ==
The film centers on model Christy Turlington and fellow models Naomi Campbell, Yasmin Le Bon, Kate Moss, Helena Christensen, Gail Elliott and Carla Bruni as they travel between Milan, Paris, and New York City during Spring 1994 Fashion Week. Turlington walks shows and attends fittings for Chanel, Versace, Dior, Giorgio Armani, Jean Paul Gaultier, Karl Lagerfeld, John Galliano, Anna Sui and finally Isaac Mizrahi. Between shows, Turlington shoots a cover for W, socializes with her friends, and attends a photo exhibition for Bruce Weber. In the final scene, Turlington is drawn by artist Francesco Clemente.

The film was shot in black and white and color and incorporated behind-the-scenes footage of many designers at work, including Lagerfeld, Valentino, Alaia, a young Galliano, and Gianni Versace four years before his death.

== Notable fashion icons ==
The film features appearances by many well-known and influential people in the fashion industry, including models, fashion photographers and designers.

=== Designers ===
- Azzedine Alaia
- Giorgio Armani
- John Galliano
- Valentino Garavani
- Jean-Paul Gaultier
- Karl Lagerfeld
- Isaac Mizrahi
- Gianni Versace

=== Models ===
- Nadja Auermann
- Carla Bruni
- Naomi Campbell
- Helena Christensen
- Cindy Crawford
- Meghan Douglas
- Gail Elliott
- Linda Evangelista
- Yasmeen Ghauri
- Shalom Harlow
- Yasmin Le Bon
- Kate Moss
- Sarah Murdoch
- Tatjana Patitz
- Claudia Schiffer
- Niki Taylor
- Stella Tennant
- Veronica Webb

=== Editors ===
- Polly Mellen
- André Leon Talley
- Liz Tilberis
- Anna Wintour

=== Others ===
- Francesco Clemente
- Jaye Davidson
- Arthur Elgort
- Michael J. Fox
- Peter Lindbergh
- Oribe
- RuPaul
- Sharon Stone

== Reception ==
The film received generally negative reviews. On Rotten Tomatoes, the film has a score of 29% based on reviews from 7 critics. In 1996, The New York Times gave Catwalk a negative review, opining "the film makes it clear that Ms. Turlington is used to being stared at by everyone around her. And these star-struck gazes eventually become more interesting than the model herself, since they reveal the aura of privilege that accompanies great beauty. Nothing Ms. Turlington says, no matter how vapid, is greeted with anything less than giddy admiration. So if she seems self-involved, no wonder."
