= Polly Allen Mellen =

American fashion journalist (1924–2024)

Polly Mellen
- Born: Harriette Allen; June 18, 1924; West Hartford, Connecticut, United States
- Died: December 2024 (aged 100); Salisbury, Connecticut, United States
- Education: Miss Porter's School
- Occupations: Wardrobe stylist, fashion magazine editor
- Spouses: Louis Baker Bell (m. 1952; div. 1960); Henry Wigglesworth Mellen (m. 1965; died 2014)
- Children: 2
- Writing career
- Genres: Fashion, journalism

Harriette Allen "Polly" Mellen (June 18, 1924 – December 11 or 12, 2024) was an American stylist and fashion editor. For more than 60 years, she served as the fashion editor at Harper's Bazaar and Vogue. From 1991 to 1999, she was the creative director of Allure. Mellen formally retired from Condé Nast Publications in 1994 and remained a consultant on various projects.

== Background ==
Harriette Allen was born on June 18, 1924, to a wealthy family in West Hartford, Connecticut, and attended Miss Porter's School. She always preferred to go by "Polly". She worked as a nurse's aide in World War II.

== Career ==
Harriette Allen moved to New York in 1949. She began her career as the protégée of Diana Vreeland. Her start in the fashion was with Lord & Taylor as a salesgirl and display designer. Under Vreeland's tutelage, Mellen became an editor at Harper's Bazaar, and later at American Vogue. In the course of her career, Mellen collaborated with such photographers as Richard Avedon, Helmut Newton, and Irving Penn. Richard Avedon said of her: "She was and still is the most creative sittings editor I ever worked with."

Mellen was known for her enthusiastic support of certain young designers both in the personal and business aspects of their lives. "She’s never lost her enthusiasm, in a field where everyone seems so jaded," said Isaac Mizrahi. Geoffrey Beene called her "the industry's cheerleader", and Calvin Klein referred to her as "the quintessential fashion editor".

In 1999, she left Allure to work freelance.

Mellen appeared in a number of documentaries on the fashion industry including Unzipped and Catwalk (both 1995) and HBO's In Vogue: The Editor's Eye (2012).

== Personal life and death ==
In 1952, she married businessman Louis Baker Bell; they had two children and divorced in 1960. She was married to publisher Henry Wigglesworth Mellen from 1965 until his death in 2014.

Mellen turned 100 on June 18, 2024, and died at a care facility in Salisbury, Connecticut later that year, variously reported as on December 11 or December 12.

== Awards ==
- 1994: CFDA Lifetime Achievement award
