= Marcelle Auclair =

French novelist, biographer, journalist and poet

- Born: 11 November 1899; Montluçon
- Died: 6 June 1983 (aged 83); Paris
- Occupations: Novelist; biographer; journalist; poet
- Writing career
- Period: 1919–1979
- Subjects: religion, biography, fashion

Marcelle Auclair (11 November 1899 – 6 June 1983) was a French novelist, biographer, journalist and poet. She published biographies of several important historical figures, translated major historical/literary documents into French from Spanish, and wrote a novel. She also published an autobiographical work, two books on popular psychology, a religious book for children, a book on artistic images of Jesus. Several of her books were translated into English. She was co-founder with Jean Prouvost of the fashion magazine Marie Claire.

== Biography ==
Marcelle Auclair was born 11 November 1899 in Montluçon, central France, and died in Paris on 6 June 1984. She was the daughter of the architect Victor Auclair and his wife Eugénie Rateau. She spent part of her childhood and youth in Chile, where her father settled in 1906 to participate in the country's reconstruction after a devastating earthquake. She did her schooling in Santiago (Chile), where she also learned Spanish and English while reading French authors.

Returning to France in 1923, she married the writer Jean Prévost (m. April 28, 1926), with whom she had three children (Michel, Françoise, and Alain). They divorced in 1938.

== Literary and journalistic contributions ==
Subjects of Biographies by Marcelle Auclair

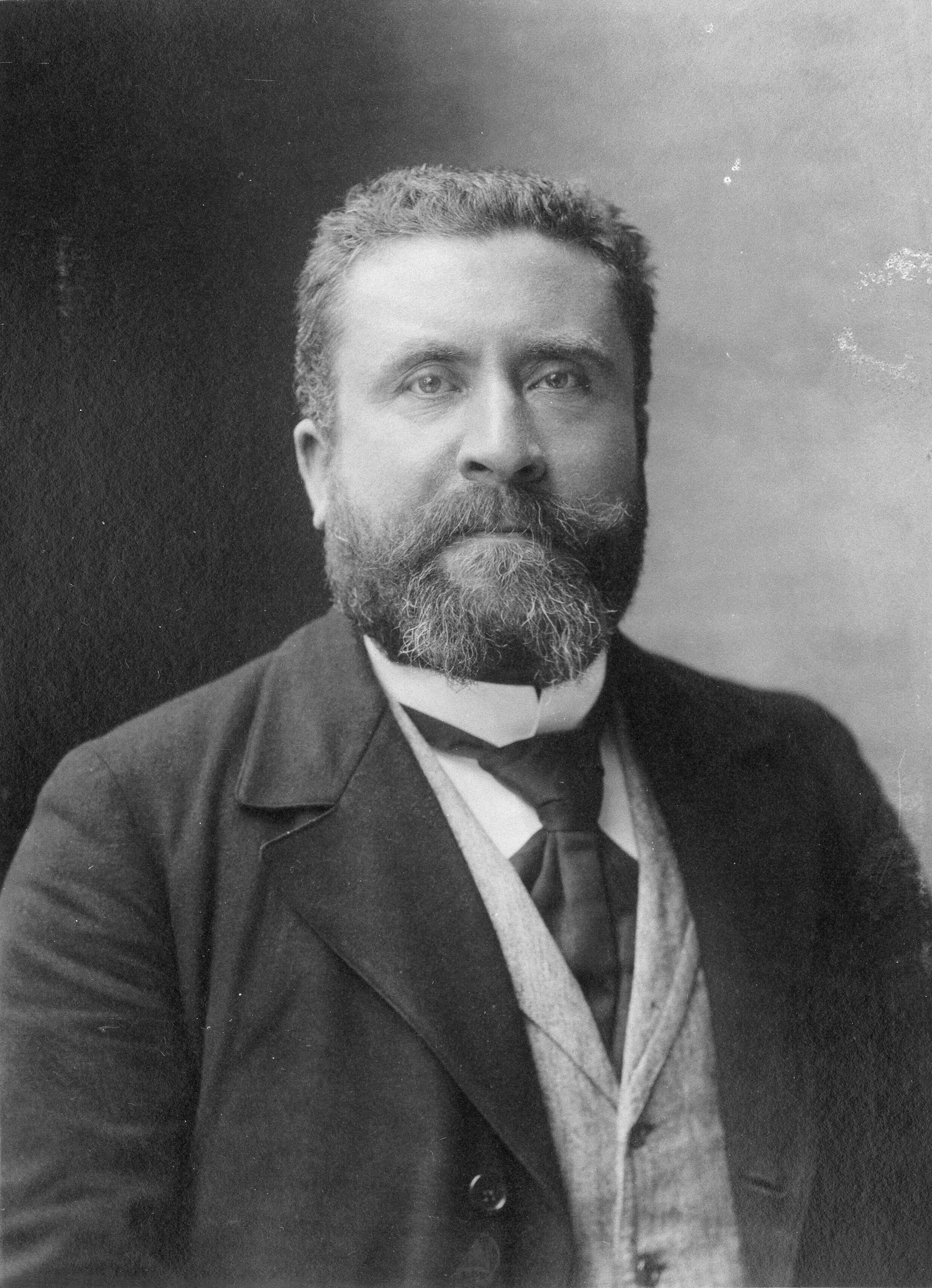
Jean Jaurès (1859–1914)

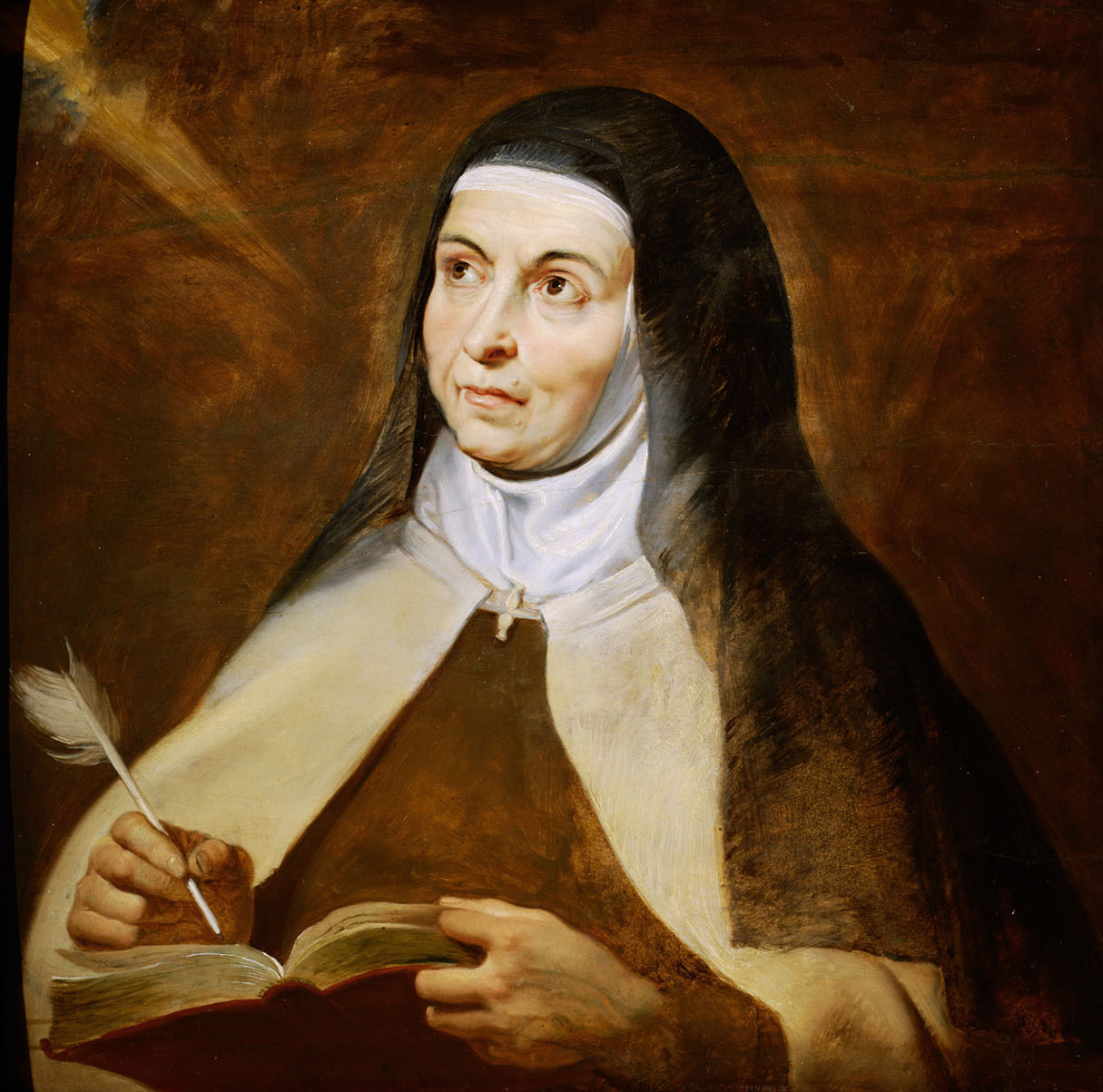
St. Teresa of Avila (1515–1582)

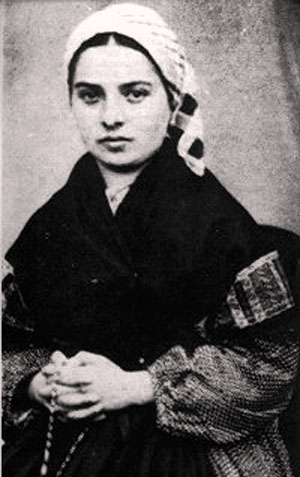
St. Bernadette of Lourdes (1844–1879)

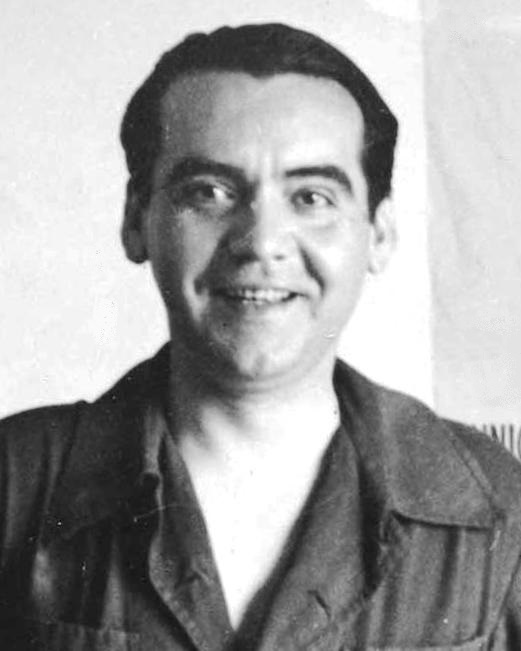
Federico García Lorca (1898–1936)

Auclair published biographies of two Roman Catholic saints, Teresa of Avila (1950) and Bernadette of Lourdes (1957). She also published biographies of Spanish poet and playwright Federico García Lorca, whom she knew personally (1968), and of the early 20th century pro-peace French socialist Jean Jaurès (1954).

Auclair's first original publication was Transparence, a book of original poetry in Spanish, published when she was 20 years old, and living in Santiago, Chile. Another early publication, in French, was Auclair's novel, Toya, published in 1927.

In 1937, Auclair and Jean Prouvost founded the fashion magazine Marie Claire. Auclair wrote many articles for Marie Claire, extending over a period of several years. In A History of Private Life (1991), writing about Auclair's time as a columnist for the magazine Marie Claire, Antoine Prost stated that

Columnists such as Marcelle Auclair, Marcelle Ségal, and Ménie Grégoire, who answered readers’ letters, became confessors to the nation. New moral authorities, they dispensed intimate advice to millions every week.

In the 1950s, Auclair published two popular books on how to lead a happy life, Le bonheur est en vous (1951) and La Pratique du bonheur (1956).

In 1953, Auclair published a French-language children's book about the life of Jesus. The book was republished in English translation in both the US and the UK.

Auclair's translation of the complete works of Teresa of Avila from Spanish to French was first published in 1964.

At age 78, five years before her death, Auclair published an autobiographical work with her daughter, actress Françoise Prévost.

In European Literary Heritage, Auclair was described as "particularly attached to moral issues and the situation of women in the contemporary world [particulièrement attachée aux problèmes moraux et à la situation de la femme dans le monde contemporain]."

== Selected works ==
=== Translated into English ===
- Auclair, Marcelle (1988). Saint Teresa of Avila. Translation by Kathleen Pond (Reprint; Originally published: New York: Pantheon, 1953 ed.). Petersham, MA: St. Bede's Publications. ISBN 978-0-932506-67-2. OCLC 18292197.(457 pages)

- French original: Auclair, Marcelle (1950). La vie de Sainte Thérèse d'Avila, la Dame Errante de Dieu. Paris, France: Éditions du Seuil. OCLC 4154440. (493 pages)
- German translation: Auclair, Marcelle (1953). Das Leben der Heiligen Teresa von Avila (in German). Zurich, Switzerland: Die Arche; Schweizer Volks-Buchgemeinde. ISBN 3-7160-1040-5. OCLC 601152104. (491 pages)

- Auclair, Marcelle (1958). Bernadette, 1858-1958. Translation by Kathryn Sullivan (1st English ed.). Purchase, NY: Manhattanville College of the Sacred Heart. OCLC 4443930. (204 pages)

- French original: Auclair, Marcelle (1957). Bernadette. Paris, France: Blond et Gay. OCLC 1956348. (284 pages)

- Auclair, Marcelle (1961). Christ's Image. Translation by Lionel Izod. New York: Tudor. OCLC 894701. (139 pages)

- French original: Auclair, Marcelle (1957). Images du Christ. Paris, France: Éditions Sun. OCLC 459435674. (144 pages)

=== French, untranslated into English ===
- Auclair, Marcelle (1951). Le bonheur est en vous. Paris, France: Éditions du Seuil. OCLC 1028450. (218 pages)
- Auclair, Marcelle (1954). La Vie de Jean Jaurès, ou, La France d'Avant 1914. Paris, France: Éditions du Seuil. OCLC 4444343. (673 pages)
- Auclair, Marcelle (1956). La pratique du bonheur. Paris, France: Éditions du Seuil. OCLC 27379363. (200 pages)
- Auclair, Marcelle (1968). Enfances et mort de Garcia Lorca. Paris, France: Éditions du Seuil. OCLC 598851. (477 pages)

- Spanish translation: Auclair, Marcelle; Federico García Lorca (1972). Vida y Muerte de García Lorca (in Spanish). Translation by Aitana Alberti. México, D.F.: Ediciones Era. OCLC 889360. (411 pages). Includes excerpts from García Lorca's works.

- Auclair, Marcelle; Françoise Prevost (1978). Mémoires à Deux Voix. Paris, France: Éditions du Seuil. ISBN 978-2-02-004872-9. OCLC 4521893. (429 pages)

=== Children's books ===
- Auclair, Marcelle (1953). La Bonne Nouvelle annoncée aux enfants. Illustrations by Jacqueline L. Gaillard. Paris, France: Éditions du Seuil. OCLC 458544529. (126 pages)

- English edition (US): Auclair, Marcelle (1954). The Little Friends of Jesus. Translation by Mary Gehr. Chicago, IL: Chicago, Henry Regnery Co. OCLC 3684033. (93 pages). Translation of La bonne nouvelle annoncee aux enfants
- English edition (UK): Auclair, Marcelle (1954). The Good News told to Children. Illustrations by Jacqueline L. Gaillard. London, UK: Burns & Oates. OCLC 52073421. (125 pages)
