= Holidays for Sale =

- Genre: Travel
- Presented by: Shelley Craft; Giaan Rooney; Frankie J. Holden; Steven Jacobs; Laura Csortan; Lara Bingle; Gorgi Quill; Sam Riley; Rob Mills; Scott McGregor
- Country of origin: Australia
- Original language: English
- No. of seasons: 1

Production
- Production locations: Sydney, Australia and all over Australia

Original release
- Network: Nine Network
- Release: 17 May 2008 – 2008

Holidays for Sale was an Australian holiday and travel television series that debuted on 17 May 2008, on the Nine Network. It was hosted by Australia's Funniest Home Videos host Shelley Craft, and presented by a team of diverse Nine Network personalities. It is now a website dedicated to offering the cheapest Australian holidays and is featured each week in the Nine Network's Getaway program.
