= Being Lara Bingle =

2012 Australian TV series

- Genre: Reality television
- Created by: Lara Bingle
- Written by: Claire Haywood
- Directed by: Ben Thompson
- Presented by: Jack Torracka
- Starring: Lara Bingle; Joshua Bingle; Hermione Underwood; Sharon Bingle
- Opening theme: "Bop Girl" by Pat Wilson
- Country of origin: Australia
- Original language: English
- No. of series: 1
- No. of episodes: 10

Production
- Executive producer: John McAvoy
- Producer: Claire Haywood
- Camera setup: Craig Donaldson; Wayne Vinten

Original release
- Network: Network Ten
- Release: 12 June – 7 August 2012

Being Lara Bingle is an Australian reality television series that premiered on 12 June 2012 on Network Ten. The series followed the misadventures of model and television personality, Lara Bingle.

== Cast ==
- Lara Bingle – Model and TV personality
- Hermione Underwood – Lara's former manager and best friend
- Josh Bingle – Lara's brother
- Sharon Bingle – Lara's mother

== Production ==
The reality series was filmed at Bondi Beach in New South Wales and other locations including Los Angeles, Melbourne, India, and New Zealand.

== Reception ==
In April 2013, Network Ten expressed that "the extreme youth focus that led to programs like (the similarly unsuccessful) The Shire and Being Lara Bingle being commissioned is not quite right for us" and that Ten would now move on from that focus.

=== Viewership ===
The series aired in the 8:00 pm–8:30 pm timeslot on Tuesdays. Ratings aggregated by OzTam subsequent to the premiere of the series indicate that the premiere episode received an estimated viewership of 925,000 viewers, during which a peak of 1.3 million was reached.

Episode number	Original air date	Viewers	Nightly rank	Weekly rank
1	12 June 2012	925,000	13	41
2	19 June 2012	786,000	14	44
3	26 June 2012	684,000	17	—N/a
4	3 July 2012	728,000	13	—N/a
5	10 July 2012	650,000	16	—N/a
6	17 July 2012	713,000	11	—N/a
7	24 July 2012	768,000; 931,000 (Note: Numbers were inflated because Being Lara Bingle took in MasterChef viewers when the show ran overtime. On actual screening minutes, it attracted 768,000 watchers.)	9	—N/a
8	31 July 2012	463,000 (Note: Ratings for this episode dropped lower possibly due to coverage of the Olympics on another channel.)	20	—N/a
9	7 August 2012	—N/a	—N/a	—N/a
10	7 August 2012	387,000	—N/a	—N/a

== See also ==
- WAG Nation
- The Stafford Brothers
