= KORA Organics =

Australian-made skincare products

- Company type: Private
- Founded: 2009; 17 years ago
- Headquarters: Los Angeles, California
- Key people: Miranda Kerr, Founder & Managing Director
- Products: Organic skin care products & cosmetics
- Website: www.KORAorganics.com

KORA Organics is a cosmetics company based in both the United States and Australia, founded by model Miranda Kerr.

== History ==
KORA Organics was launched in 2009 in Australia by its founder, Miranda Kerr, who has a background in nutrition and health psychology. The company started as a bootstrap, having been self-funded by Kerr, who holds a 95% stake. In 2017, KORA Organics began offering its products internationally, first in the U.S., partnering with cosmetics retailer Sephora. It later further expanded, and as of 2017 is stocked in 30 countries or regions and shipped to over 120 countries worldwide.
