= Sheila Márquez =

Spanish model (born 1985)

- Born: Sheila Márquez; 19 September 1985 (age 41); Vitoria-Gasteiz, Spain
- Children: 2
- Modeling information
- Height: 1.75 m (5 ft 9 in)
- Hair color: Brown
- Eye color: Brown
- Agency: Supreme Management (New York, Paris); Storm Model Management (London); LINE UP MODEL MANAGEMENT (Barcelona); UNIQUE DENMARK (Copenhagen); Modelwerk (Hamburg)

Sheila Márquez (born in Vitoria-Gasteiz, Spain, 19 September 1985) is a Spanish model.

== Career ==
She was a Model, discovered when a friend of hers insisted that she go see her agent in Madrid at Traffic Models. In 2006 after signing with Women Management she moved to New York to pursue her modelling career. On Feb. 2007 she made her debut at the Gucci show in Milan, as an exclusive. Then becomes the face of Alessandro Dell'Acqua's fall 2007 campaign. She was featured at No. 7 in V Magazine.com's top 10 models of fall 2007. Thus, joining compatriot Marina Perez on the very small list of Spanish models working in high-fashion today. Appearing in a thirteen-page editorial for 10, then photographed alongside Meghan Collison, Laragh McCann, and Oxana Pautova for a POP editorial titled "Fire Walk With Me," inspired by David Lynch. In January 2008 Sheila was featured in a ten-page editorial for Spanish Vogue. New York Magazine ranked her No. 8 in the "Top Ten Models to Watch" in 2008 New York Fashion Week. Sheila left Women Management and signed with Supreme Management in 2010. Lands the cover of Playing Fashion September 2010 issue.

Besides being in the cover of Harper's Bazaar Spain January 2011, she is also in its 2011 calendar. For each month she wore twelves designs from top designers and all the creations used Swarovski Elements. Sheila becomes the first Spanish top model to grace the cover of Harper's Bazaar. As well as the face of Blanco Jeans Spring 2011 Campaign.
