= Karen Mulder =

Dutch model (born 1969)

- Born: 1 June 1969 (age 57); Vlaardingen, Netherlands
- Occupations: Model, singer
- Years active: 1985–2002, 2007, 2026–present
- Spouse: René Bosne (m. 1988; div. 1993)
- Children: 1
- Modeling information
- Height: 5 ft 10 in (1.78 m)
- Hair color: Blonde
- Eye color: Grey
- Agencies: Elite (Paris, Milan); Justin Weijgers Artist Management
- Website: thekarenmulder.com

Karen Mulder (born 1 June 1969) is a Dutch fashion model. She is known for her work as a supermodel during the supermodel era of the late 80s to mid 90s. Mulder has featured on over 700 magazine covers and was one of the original Victoria's Secret angels. After leaving modelling in 2000, she focused on music and acting before retiring in 2002.

In 2002, she released her cover single I Am What I Am which reached No. 13 in France. In 2026, she returned to the public eye, featuring on the September cover of Vogue Deutsch and launching an Instagram account.

== Early life ==
Mulder was born in 1969 in Vlaardingen, the Netherlands. She was raised in The Hague and Voorburg. Her father, Ben Mulder, is a tax inspector and her mother, Marijke (née de Jong), is a secretary. Mulder has a younger sister, Saskia, who became an actress after a stint studying economics.

In 1985, Mulder and her family went on a camping trip in the south of France. She saw an ad for Elite Model Management's "Look of the Year" contest in a newspaper. Mulder was wearing braces at the time and dismissed the idea of applying. A friend took some photographs she had of her and sent them to Elite without her knowledge. She won the preliminary contest in Amsterdam, and was sent to the finals of the contest, placing second. Mulder soon found herself in high demand for modeling jobs and was signed by Elite Paris.

== Career ==
By her second year on the runway, Mulder was modeling for Valentino, Yves Saint Laurent, Lanvin, Christian Lacroix, Versace, and Giorgio Armani. In 1991, she made the first of many appearances on the cover of Vogue and also landed a contract with Guess. A New York Times article from 1991 described Mulder's work schedule, detailing a typical thirteen hour day packed with obligations to Ralph Lauren, a French film crew, Anna Sui and Giorgio Sant'Angelo.

Mulder appeared on the cover of British and Spanish Vogue in 1991–1992 and became the face of a Nivea advertising campaign. In 1992, Mulder signed a contract with Victoria's Secret. In 1993, she was featured on the cover of Vogue in January and again in March.

In the mid-1990s, Mulder's off-the-runway career was managed by her then-partner, Jean-Yves Le Fur. In 1995, he collaborated with Hasbro on a Karen Mulder doll, which spurred development of a line of dolls modeled on the supermodels of the time. Le Fur and Mulder also made an infomercial and video. Mulder released a beauty and fashion CD-ROM, in which she presented makeup, beauty, and exercise tips. She is currently being represented by Justin Weijgers.

One of the first issues of Elle Top Model magazine was entirely devoted to Mulder along with an entire issue of Italian Vogue. Her two appearances in the Sports Illustrated Swimsuit Issue in 1997 and 1998 and her poses for the Victoria's Secret catalogue increased Mulder's profile. In 1997 she released her own calendar. Mulder was one of the first Victoria's Secret angels and reportedly suggested the idea of wearing wings on the runway to executives, inspired by Charlie's Angels.

For many years, Mulder was among the ten best-paid models in the world. At one point in her career, she was reportedly earning up to £10,000 a day.

In the early 2000s, she began to speak out about the dark side of the modeling industry and the dangers faced by girls who were still children, and by young women.

In 2000, Mulder retired from modeling. She made her acting debut in the French short film A Theft, One Night in 2001.

Mulder also pursued music, and released an album including the single I Am What I Am which achieved some success in the French charts in 2002. The single reached No. 13 in France, No. 22 in Belgium's Wallonia region, and No. 81 in Switzerland. In 2004, she worked with Daniel Chenevez of Niagara to create the self-titled CD Karen Mulder.

=== Return to modeling ===
On 1 July 2007, Mulder returned to the catwalk at the Dior Autumn/Winter 07/08 Couture Collection in Paris, modelling alongside Naomi Campbell, Linda Evangelista, Helena Christensen, Amber Valletta, Shalom Harlow, and Stella Tennant. After the show Mulder once again retreated from the public eye.

In 2026, Mulder returned to the industry, featuring on the September cover of Vogue Deutsch.

== Personal life ==
In 1988, at the age of 18, Mulder married French photographer René Bosne. They divorced in 1993. Mulder stated that her life changed in 1993 when she was shuttling from airport to airport with almost no time at home. She then met real estate developer Jean-Yves Le Fur in the waiting lounge of a Paris airport. They became engaged but their relationship ended in 1997. In 1995, she bought a château in France and set up a programme to provide holidays there for underprivileged children.

Mulder gave birth to a daughter on 30 October 2006.

Karen Mulder is trilingual being equally fluent in her native Dutch, English and French, which she speaks flawlessly with only a slight Dutch lilt.

As of 2026, Mulder lives in Paris.

== Allegations, legal issues, and mental health ==
On 31 October 2001, Mulder was interviewed on the France 2 show Tout le monde en parle (Everyone is Talking About It), hosted by Thierry Ardisson in front of a live studio audience. During the show's taping, Mulder alleged that she had been raped by a family friend since the age of 2, and that various figures had later raped her, including police officers, politicians, members of her former agency Elite Model Management, and Albert II, Prince of Monaco. She would later retract the allegations, except for her early childhood abuse. The show did not air, as its creators were concerned about her mental state. Days later, Mulder repeated her allegations to a weekly magazine, VSD.

Mulder's parents blamed her drugs and lack of eating, stating "when we visited her in Paris we could see for ourselves. Everywhere there were notebooks full of her tangled thoughts and mad ideas. She was accusing everyone and everything. It was awful to read them". Mulder was hospitalised at Villa Montsouris psychiatric facility for five months. The stay was reportedly paid for by Elite models president Gérald Marie, her employer and one of the accused. Her parents supported her hospitalization.

The French police began an investigation into Mulder's allegations.

Following release from the hospital, Mulder retracted her allegations. She stated that she had "gone overboard" in response to her childhood sexual abuse, and had tried to kill herself.

On 10 December 2002, after suffering for years from chronic depression, Mulder went into a coma after she overdosed on sleeping pills in an apparent suicide attempt. She left no note. She was rushed to the American Hospital in Neuilly after neighbors found her passed out on the floor of the Paris apartment on exclusive Avenue Montaigne where she was staying with friends. Mulder's parents flew from the Netherlands to be by her side along with former fiancé Jean-Yves Le Fur. Le Fur was reportedly one of the people who found Mulder unconscious upon his arrival at the apartment after Mulder had not answered several of his telephone calls. She awoke from her coma the next day.

On 1 July 2009, it was reported that Mulder was arrested in Paris for leaving irate and threatening voicemails for her plastic surgeon.

In 2026, Mulder said to German Vogue that she was forced to retract her 2001 allegations, being "locked away" and "silenced". She also confirmed that she never met Jeffrey Epstein, a rumour that appeared following the release of the Epstein Files.
