= Ava Smith =

American model

- Born: November 4, 1988 (age 37); Chicago, Illinois
- Modeling information
- Height: 1.73 m (5 ft 8 in)
- Hair color: Brown
- Eye color: Blue
- Agency: The Lions (New York); Elite Model Management (Barcelona, Toronto); Select Model Management (Paris); Women Management (Milan); Models 1 (London); Modelwerk (Hamburg); MP Management (Atlanta, Los Angeles, Stockholm, Chicago) (mother agency)

Ava Smith is an American fashion model.

== Early life ==
Smith was born in Chicago. She has three siblings.

== Career ==
Smith was introduced to Elite Model Management's Chicago branch by a family friend. She appeared in a British Vogue editorial, a Russian Vogue editorial, a United Colors of Benetton advertisement, a Nordstrom advertisement, and walked for DKNY, Helmut Lang, and Thierry Mugler. After finishing her education, she started modeling full-time in 2011. After signing with Wilhelmina Models, she walked in over 50 shows including Calvin Klein, Gucci, Dolce & Gabbana, Givenchy, YSL, Missoni, Isabel Marant, Rochas, and Chanel.

Smith was once ranked as a "Money Girl" by models.com

In 2014, she appeared in an ensemble campaign for Tommy Hilfiger, along with models such as Marlon Teixeira, Maud Welzen, Cora Emmanuel, and RJ King.
