= Tanga Moreau =

Belgian model

- Born: Tanga Moreau; Brussels, Belgium
- Modeling information
- Height: 1.74 m (5 ft 9 in)
- Hair color: Blonde
- Eye color: Blue / green

Tanga Moreau is a Belgian model. She has appeared on the cover of Vogue Paris and in the 1998 Sports Illustrated Swimsuit Issue. She has done extensive print and runway work for many leading fashion companies, especially in the late 1990s.
