= Liskula Cohen =

- Born: February 3, 1972 (age 54); Ontario, Canada
- Modeling information
- Height: 5 ft 10 in (1.78 m)
- Hair color: Blonde
- Eye color: Blue
- Agency: KM Model Management in NYC, Heffner Models in Seattle, LA Models in LA, Bettys Models in Miami, Spot 6 in Toronto, and Folio in Montreal

Liskula Cohen (born February 3, 1972) is a Canadian-born fashion model, based in New York City, who has appeared in, and on the covers of, various fashion magazines including Vogue, Elle, and Cleo.

On January 14, 2007, Samir Dervisevic, a New York City doorman, struck her in the face with a glass vodka bottle. She was rushed to a hospital where she received 46 stitches. Dervisevic pleaded guilty in October, and was sentenced to 30 days in jail and three years' probation, according to court records. He was arrested again in July 2008 and charged with the same crime and did one year in jail for breaking his probation.

== Google lawsuit ==
In January, 2009, after an anonymous blogger on a website called Skanks in NYC had called her 'skanky' and 'an old hag', Cohen filed a defamation suit seeking a court order compelling Google and its Blogger service to identify the anonymous blogger. The blog had described her in disparaging and allegedly defamatory terms and displayed pictures of her simulating sex with a man at a party. In August 2009, a Manhattan Supreme Court judge ruled that Cohen was entitled to know the name of the blogger who had authored the blog, ordering Google to release the blogger's name. Cohen then filed a defamation lawsuit against the blogger, Rosemary Port, for $3 million. Port then announced plans to sue Google for $15 million for breach of a fiduciary duty to protect her privacy, but has never filed any papers.
