= Liz Ham =

London-born Australian photographer (born 1975)

- Born: 1975 (age 50–51); London, England
- Known for: Photography
- Website: lizham.com

Liz Ham (born 1975) is an English-born Australian photographer based in Sydney, Australia. Ham has photographed urban life, fashion, music and politics for years and in 2017 published a photography book called Punk Girls. Some of Ham's photographs have been purchased and archived by Australia National Libraries as representations of the culture of Australia.

== Career ==
Ham is one of Australia's contemporary photographers "who often works overseas". Ham began photographing when she was 14, then studied photography at the College of Fine Arts in Sydney. Since then she has documented life in Australia with her photos, from city dwelling, to fashion, to ballet, and punk rock for 20 years. Her work is editorial in nature, portrait, and for advertisers. Ham 'has thrived in the male-dominated industry of fashion photography' but "social advocacy is her motivating factor" as she captures images, using her Canon EOS 5D Mark III and a 4×5 rangefinder Polaroid conversion camera. Her photographs have appeared in Vogue, Elle, Russh, Oyster, Dazed & Confused and i-D.

== Exhibitions ==
In 2000, Ham exhibited her work at Stills Gallery, in 2013 at the Sydney Photographer's Exhibition, and in 2018 at the Museum of Contemporary Art Sydney.

== Selected awards ==
Ham has received the following awards for her work.

- Yen Young Woman of the Year Award for Photography
- The National Youth Media Award
- The CCP/Leica Documentary Photography Award

== Photographic collections ==
=== Fashion ===
Ham has done work for Oyster magazine and in 2009, Teddy Girls images by Ham were published by Oyster and then in Art Monthly Australia in 2010. Ham has photographed for Vogue Australia. Design Scene magazine featured a retro style photo shoot by Ham entitled The Apple of My Eye.

=== Culture of Australia ===
In 1997 Ham photographed bohemian dancer Vali Myers. To represent the culture of Australia, Ham has photographed people she knows in their natural daily environment, using realism and social documentary photography.

=== Archived ===
Some of her photographs have been purchased and archived by the State Library of New South Wales and by the State Library of Victoria. The collections archived by Australian state libraries relate to ordinary people in Sydney doing regular things: urban life, people at work, and dance, hairdressing, and shopping.

== Publications ==
Ham spent years working on Punk Girls, a photo-book featuring portraits of women, many of her friends, in punk fashion. It began as a punk zine but was published in 2017 by Manuscript Daily. Discrimination against the punk rock subculture is explored with her photographs in the book; these girls who are different, but beautiful in their difference.

In 2014 Ham self-published a limited edition of Eastern Suburbs Girls, a small 56-page photo-book showing what it might have been like "growing up in the Eastern Suburbs of Sydney, Australia in the 1980s and 1990s."

== Personal life ==
Born in London in 1975, she emigrated with her parents to Sydney in 1980. Ham lives with her husband and two children in Sydney.
