= Miranda Kerr =

Australian model (born 1983)

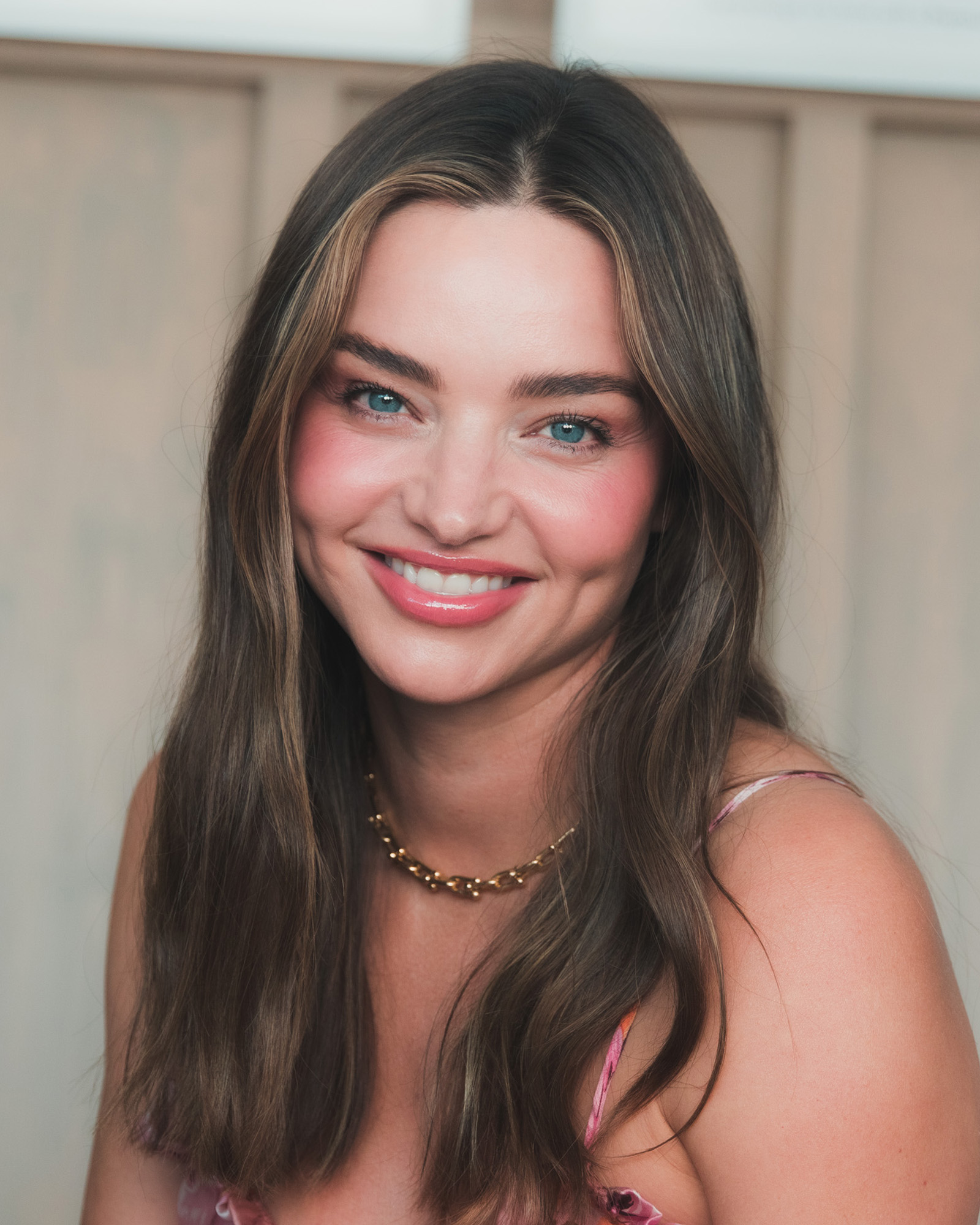
- Kerr in 2025
- Born: Miranda May Kerr; 20 April 1983 (age 43); Sydney, New South Wales, Australia
- Occupation: Model
- Years active: 1997–present
- Spouses: Orlando Bloom (m. 2010; div. 2013); Evan Spiegel (m. 2017)
- Children: 4
- Modelling information
- Height: 1.75 m (5 ft 9 in)
- Hair colour: Brown
- Eye colour: Blue
- Agency: IMG Models (Worldwide); Traffic Models (Barcelona)

Miranda May Kerr (/kɜːr/; born 20 April 1983) is an Australian model. She rose to prominence in 2007 as one of the Victoria's Secret Angels. Kerr was the first Australian Victoria's Secret model and also represented the Australian department store chain David Jones. She has launched her own brand of organic skincare products, KORA Organics, and has written a self-help book.

Kerr began modelling in the fashion industry when she was only 13, winning the 1997 Dolly magazine model search competition. Since 2008, she has consistently ranked on the Forbes list of highest earning models. She was previously married to English actor Orlando Bloom, with whom she had her first son. Since 2017, she has been married to Snapchat CEO Evan Spiegel, with whom she has three children.

== Early life ==
Kerr was born in Sydney and raised in Gunnedah. She is the daughter of Therese and John Kerr. Her mother gave birth to her at 17 years old. She has a brother, Matthew, who is two years younger. Kerr is of English ancestry, with smaller amounts of Scottish and French. During her childhood, Kerr "raced motorbikes and rode horses on her grandmother's farm". She describes her early life in the Australian countryside as "very grounding ... there wasn't any pretentiousness and no one really cared what you were wearing. You could just be you." As a teenager, she was an exchange student in Virginia, United States. Kerr is a Christian.

Her family moved to Brisbane, Queensland, to allow Kerr and her brother to experience city life. Kerr was initially reluctant to leave her childhood hometown, but her first boyfriend, Christopher Middlebrook, died in a car accident when they were teenagers and she said it was too painful to stay there. In 2000, she graduated from All Hallows' School, a Catholic all-girls school in Brisbane, QLD. Kerr studied nutrition and health psychology before pursuing modelling.

== Career ==
=== 1997–2006: Career beginnings ===
At age 13, Kerr entered and won the 1997 annual Dolly magazine/Impulse model competition. She was flown to Sydney a week before her 14th birthday to shoot for the magazine. Upon Kerr's win, local media expressed "concerned outrage" at her young age. The controversy raised concerns about the glorification of young girls within the fashion, beauty, and entertainment industries.

Some media outlets claimed her Dolly shoot (including images of a 14-year-old Kerr in bathing suits) constituted a form of paedophilia. Of the press, Kerr said: "In the media at the time they were trying to cling on to anything remotely to do with paedophilia. Dolly is a magazine for teenage girls, not for old men. And I was fully clothed! Doing a winter shoot! They just made something out of nothing."

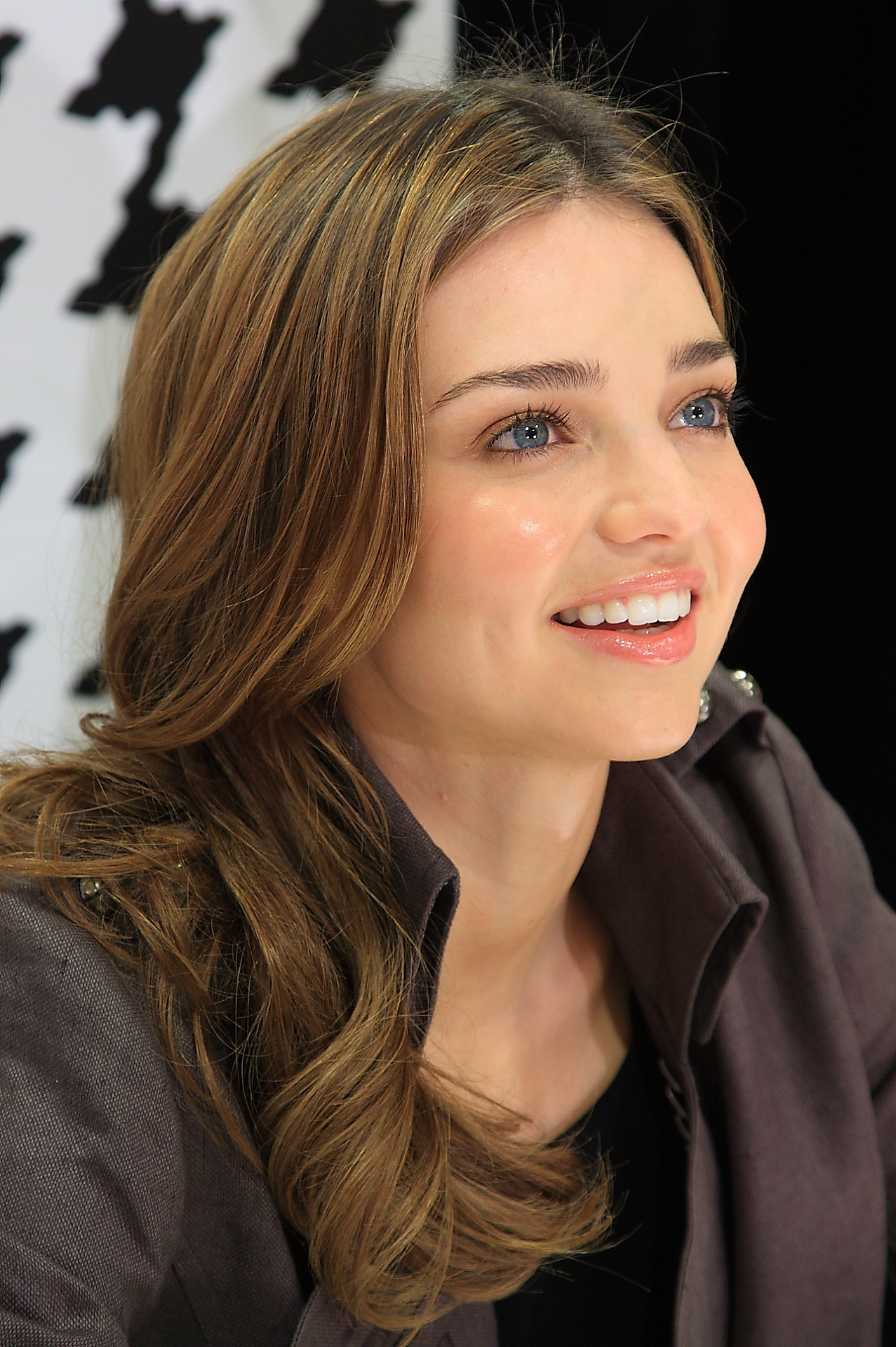
Kerr in Perth

Kerr signed to Chic Management's Sydney division (c. 1997). She received considerable commercial exposure after a series of beachwear ads predominantly for Australian surf chain Billabong, in which Kerr modelled surf brands Tigerlily, Roxy, Billabong Girls, and One Teaspoon. Kerr was also the brand ambassador of Australia's most recognised swimwear brand, Seafolly. After modelling in Australia and Japan, Kerr relocated to New York, where she acquired a minority stake in the Bowery Ballroom, a music venue.

In New York, Kerr signed with Next Management and had a slew of runway appearances in early 2004. From there, she was booked for runway and print campaigns for labels including Alex Perry, Baby Phat, Lisa Ho, Voodoo Dolls, Levi's, Bettina Liano, Nicola Finetti, L.A.M.B., Heatherette, Betsey Johnson, Trelise Cooper, Jets, John Richmond, Blumarine Swimwear, Neiman Marcus, Anna Molinari, Rock and Republic, Roberto Cavalli, and Ober Jeans. Kerr was also booked for print in magazines such as Elle Girl, Vogue Australia and Harper's Bazaar.

She signed a contract with American cosmetics brand Maybelline. Along with several other Victoria's Secret models, Kerr was also featured in a music video for the single "Number One" by Pharrell featuring Kanye West.

=== 2007–2012: Victoria's Secret and high fashion work ===
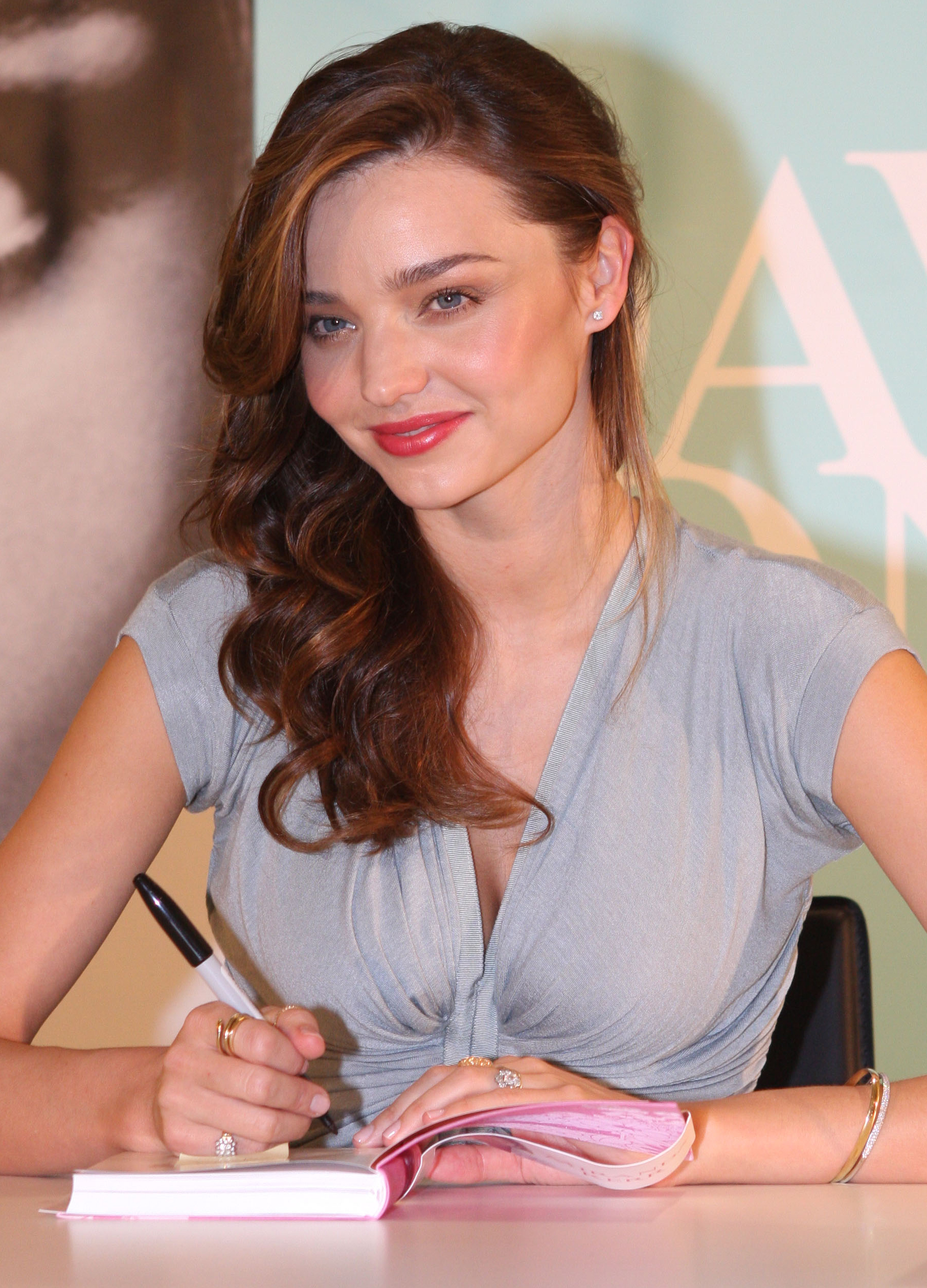
Kerr at a book signing in 2011

Following her success with Maybelline, Kerr became the first ever Australian Victoria's Secret Angel joining models Alessandra Ambrosio, Karolína Kurková, Adriana Lima, Selita Ebanks, Izabel Goulart and Heidi Klum. Before becoming an Angel in 2007, Kerr was already picked to become the successor of Alessandra Ambrosio as the face of PINK in 2006.

In 2007, Kerr signed on as the face of Californian fashion retailer Arden B. Kerr made a small guest appearance in the CBS sitcom How I Met Your Mother alongside fellow Angels Adriana Lima, Marisa Miller, Alessandra Ambrosio, Heidi Klum and Selita Ebanks.

In 2008, Kerr became the new face of the fragrance Clinique Happy and signed a six-figure deal to be the new face of Australian department store David Jones, replacing model Megan Gale. She also appeared on the cover of British Harper's Bazaar. Earning an estimated US$3.5 million over the previous 12 months, Forbes placed Kerr at No. 10 on the list of the world's top-earning models.

In June 2009, Kerr posed naked, chained to a tree, for an issue of Rolling Stone Australia, to raise awareness for the endangered koalas. In October, Kerr launched her own brand of organic skincare products, KORA Organics, with George Moskos, and became the face for the company. Kerr released an inspirational self-esteem, self-help book, Treasure Yourself. The book is aimed at female teenagers. Kerr also shot a spring/summer ad campaign for XOXO. Kerr appeared in Forbes's 2009 list of the world's highest-paid models, ranking at No. 9 with estimated earnings of $3 million. She left Next to sign with IMG Models.

Kerr appeared in the 2010 Pirelli Calendar, photographed by Terry Richardson in Bahia, Brazil. Previously better known for her Victoria's Secret status rather than her high fashion work, Balenciaga is credited for launching her high fashion modelling career when casting directors Ashley Brokaw and designer Nicolas Ghesquière chose her to walk exclusively for the brand's spring 2010 runway show. It was her first fashion show for a high fashion designer. A season later she walked for design company Prada for their fall 2010 collection in Milan alongside fellow Angels Doutzen Kroes and Alessandra Ambrosio. Kerr then modelled for campaigns for Prada and Jil Sander, and was shot by Steven Meisel for the cover of Vogue Italia for the September issue.

In January 2011, Kerr became the first pregnant model for Vogue when featured in Vogue Australia, being six months pregnant at the time of the shoot. In March she hit the catwalk for Balenciaga's fall 2011 ready-to-wear collection as part of Paris Fashion Week, two months after giving birth. Kerr also posed nude for a 2011 Harper's Bazaar photo shoot. In October at Paris Fashion Week S/S12, Kerr walked for Dior, Lanvin, Chanel, John Galliano, Stella McCartney, Viktor & Rolf and Loewe. Kerr was chosen to present the $2.5 million Victoria's Secret Fantasy Treasure Bra for their fashion show in November 2011. Kerr then featured in the Spring 2012 campaign for Bally alongside German model Julia Stegner.

In January 2012, she was named ambassador for Qantas. In March, Kerr walked for Chanel and Miu Miu at Fall/Winter Paris Fashion Week. Kerr was featured on the June cover of Numéro Tokyo, shot by Nino Muñoz. In August, Kerr appeared on the cover of Vogue Turkey and in November, was named the new face of high street brand Mango, replacing Kate Moss for its spring/summer 2013 campaign.

=== 2013–present: Continued success ===
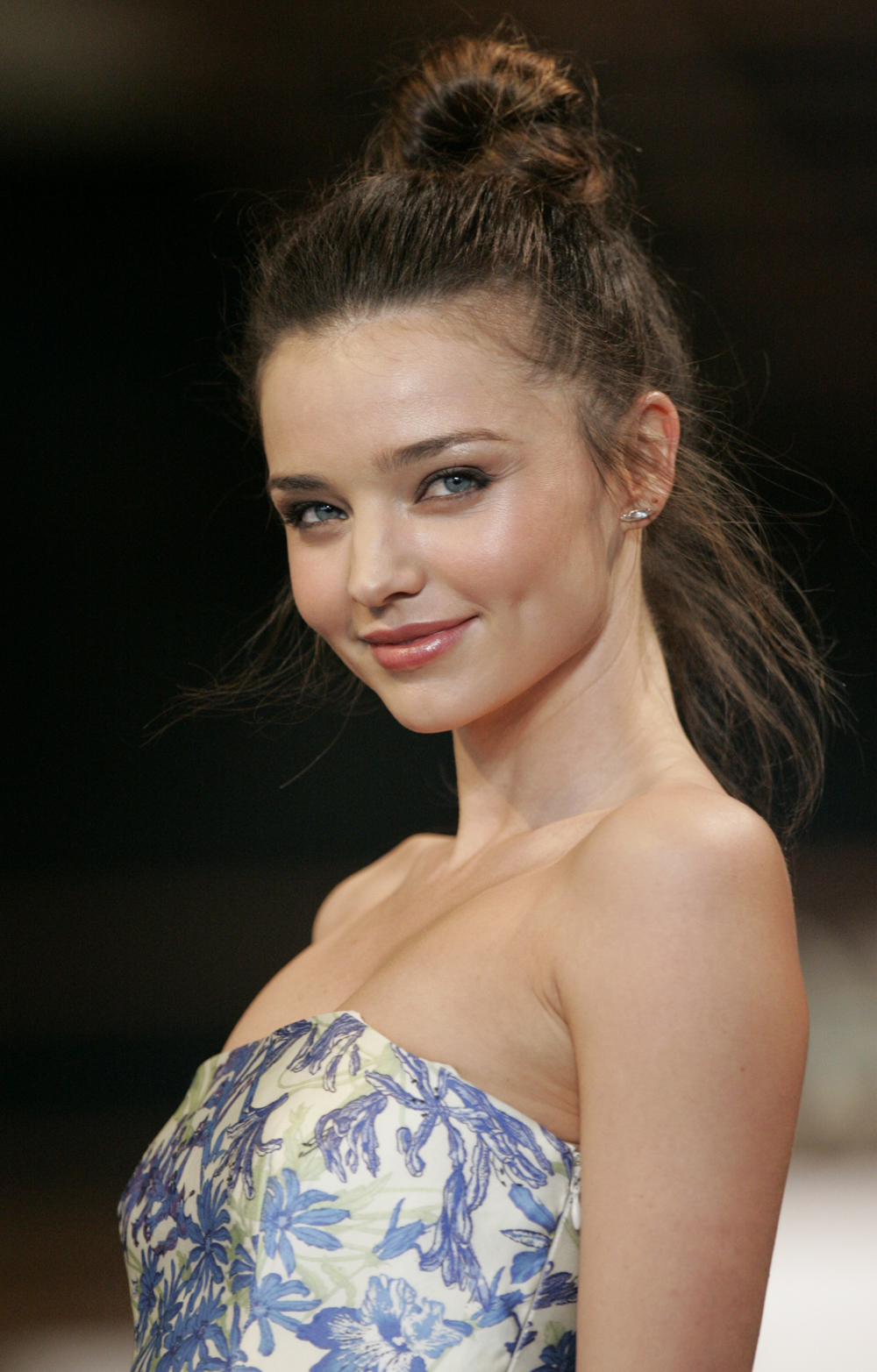
Kerr in 2013

In March 2013, negotiations to renew her five-year contract with David Jones "fell through," leading to a peaceful split between the two parties. The following month, it was reported that Kerr's three-year, US$1-million contract with Victoria's Secret was not being renewed. Anonymous sources claimed Kerr had a "difficult reputation" and was not "a big seller for VS"; however, Kerr's camp stated she was unable to commit the necessary time to the brand. In response, Victoria's Secret chief marketing officer Ed Razek stated he had already invited Kerr to walk in that year's fashion show. Kerr headlined the April issue of Vogue Australia and the July issue of Vogue Korea.

She was ranked No. 2 in Forbes 2013 list of the world's highest-paid models, with estimated earnings of $7.2 million, which is $3.2 million more and a jump of five places in the list from the previous year. In October, Kerr was named the face of Austrian crystal house Swarovski for their fall 2013 campaign, and that December she starred in social shopping website ShopStyle's first national campaign.

In February 2014, Kerr became the face of Swedish clothing brand H&M. She then featured in high-profile campaigns for Reebok and Wonderbra. In March, Kerr opened and closed for Sonia Rykiel at Fall/Winter Paris Fashion Week. On 22 April 2014, Kerr released her first single online, featuring her and crooner Bobby Fox, in a cover of Elvis Presley's "You're The Boss". In July, Kerr became the face of the Escada fragrance, Joyful, attending the launch at the brand's flagship Munich store. Kerr modelled for the covers of the May issue of Vogue Taiwan and the July issue of Vogue Australia. She was among the 50 models on the September cover of Vogue Italia, celebrating the magazine's 50th anniversary. She was also prominently featured in the November, 15-year anniversary issue of Vogue Japan, shot by Mario Testino. Kerr ranked No. 3 on the 2014 Forbes list of highest earning models, earning an estimated $7 million.

Kerr was the cover model for the February 2015 issue of American Harper's Bazaar, shot by Richardson. She also covered the March issue of Australian Harper's Bazaar, shot by Kai Z. Feng. In July, Kerr designed a jewelry line with Swarovski, having served as the face of the brand since 2013. Kerr spoke of the collaboration, "I wanted it to be reflective of myself and my personality and who I am. And [Swarovski] really let me have full creative control. I knew what I wanted. I wanted it to be fine, and delicate and have meaning, and hopefully, inspiration." Kerr ranked No. 6 on the 2015 Forbes list of highest earning models, earning an estimated $6.5 million. She then appeared on the December cover of Vogue Thailand, the first Australian model to do so. She was also shot by Doug Inglish in a short video as part of LOVE's annual advent calendar.

Kerr began 2016 by fronting Riccardo Tisci's Spring/Summer campaign for Givenchy, alongside models including Joan Smalls, Natalia Vodianova and fellow Australian, Gemma Ward. Her January/February cover for Australian Harper's Bazaar sparked controversy, depicting a nude Kerr under the cover line "What Lies Beneath." The cover was later pulled from the national supermarket chain, Coles. In March, Kerr was announced as the face of Joe Fresh's fall campaign. She also featured on international covers of Elle, Harper's Bazaar, Madame Figaro and L'Officiel. In June, she opened Jeremy Scott's Resort 2017 show for Moschino, alongside veteran models including Devon Aoki and fellow Victoria's Secret Angels Chanel Iman and Alessandra Ambrosio. The same month, Kerr filmed a guest mentor role on cycle 10 of Australia's Next Top Model. Kerr ranked No. 10 on the 2016 Forbes list of highest paid models, earning an estimated $6 million.

In February 2017, Kerr featured in a commercial for Buick, alongside Cam Newton, which aired during Super Bowl LI. In July, she appeared in a video campaign for Louis Vuitton entitled Connected Journeys, celebrating the launch of the brand's Tambour Horizon smartwatch, which also featured celebrities including Jennifer Connelly, Doona Bae, Jaden Smith and Catherine Deneuve.

When Kerr first appeared on the list of highest earning models, Ed Razek described Kerr's appeal as having "... the cheeks of a chipmunk, the smile of an angel and the body of a devil."

== Personal life ==
=== Relationships ===
In 2003, Kerr dated finance broker Adrian Camilleri. Following an Australian Securities & Investments Commission investigation, Camilleri was found guilty on five counts of fraudulent behaviour from February 2003 to February 2004. A 2007 newspaper report claims that Kerr suffered financially "after taking her boyfriend's financial advice" but chose not to take legal action.

From 2003 to mid-2007, Kerr dated Jay Lyon, the lead singer of the band Tamarama. Kerr starred in Tamarama's video clip for "Everything To Me".

Kerr began dating English actor Orlando Bloom in late 2007. In 2009, a gang of thieves known as the Bling Ring broke into Bloom's home. The group stole luxury brand clothing and jewellery. In this case, the ringleader allegedly wanted Kerr's Victoria's Secret lingerie. Kerr and Bloom announced their engagement in June 2010, and married the following month. Kerr gave birth to their son in January 2011. In October 2013, Kerr and Bloom announced that they had separated several months earlier, and planned to end their marriage. The divorce was official by the end of 2013. In 2017, she told Net-a-Porter's The Edit magazine, "It was the right thing to do; we weren't bringing the best out in each other," but added that they are still good friends.

In June 2017, Kerr surrendered $8 million in jewelry to the US government that had been given to her in 2014 by Malaysian businessman Jho Low, who was later indicted in the 1Malaysia Development Berhad scandal.

Kerr also discussed bisexuality during an interview with GQ in 2014 stating "I appreciate both men and women. I love the female body and truly appreciate the female form. I want to explore. Never say never!"

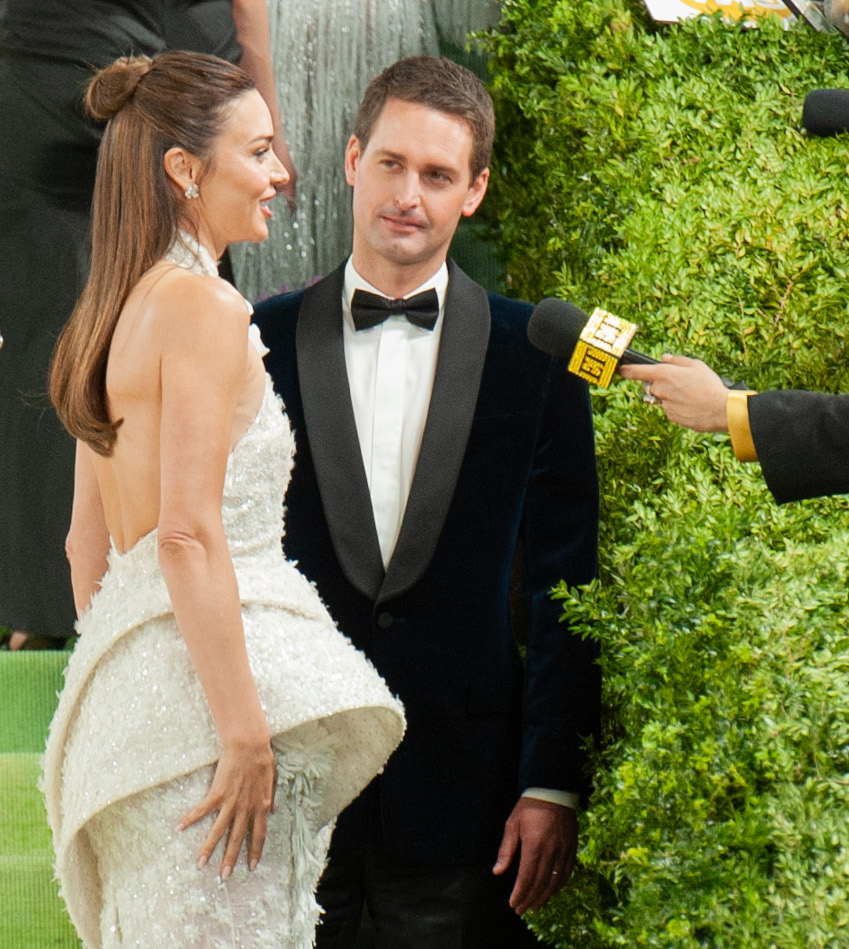
Kerr and Spiegel at the 2026 Met Gala

In 2015, Kerr began dating billionaire Snapchat co-founder and CEO Evan Spiegel. In July 2016, Kerr announced her engagement to Spiegel, and they married in May 2017. Kerr wore a custom Dior wedding dress designed by Maria Grazia Chiuri that was inspired by Grace Kelly's wedding gown. They have three sons, born May 2018, October 2019, and February 2024.

=== Religious views ===
In response to claims that she was a practising Buddhist, she told The Daily Telegraph that she was a Christian:

"I'm not Buddhist. I'm Christian. I pray every day. I meditate every day and I do yoga. I'm not religious, I'm spiritual. And praying is something my grandmother taught me as well. To pray and be grateful, have gratitude, is a big thing for me."

She later told Into The Gloss:

I like to pray and I like to meditate. Doing just three minutes of prayer and a minimum of five minutes meditation twice a day sets the tone—like an arrow so that you're hitting your target. When I pray I always thank Mother Nature for all the beauty in the world; it's about having an attitude of gratitude. And then I pray to Christ to say, 'Thank you for this day and my family and my health,' and now that I'm older I've added, 'Please illuminate me. Please open my heart chakra. Open my aperture and uplift my consciousness so that I can be the best version of myself.'

She says her religious faith, including practices like forgiveness, prayer, meditation, and speaking with friends, helped her deal with challenges such as the death of her then-boyfriend at age 15, and "makes it a priority to pray about forgiving herself and others."

== Filmography ==
=== Film ===
| Year | Title | Role |
|---|---|---|
| 2013 | The Bling Ring | Archived Footage |

=== Television ===
| Year | Title | Role |
|---|---|---|
| 2007 | How I Met Your Mother | Herself |
| 2012 | Project Runway All Stars | Guest Judge |
| 2012 | Project Runway Australia | Guest Judge |
| 2016 | Australia's Next Top Model | Guest Mentor |
