= Unzipped (film) =

1995 American film by Douglas Keeve

- Directed by: Douglas Keeve
- Starring: Linda Evangelista; Naomi Campbell; Cindy Crawford; Kate Moss; Isaac Mizrahi
- Cinematography: Ellen Kuras; Robert Leacock
- Edited by: Paula Heredia; Alan Oxman
- Music by: Mark Ambrosino
- Distributed by: Miramax Films
- Release dates: January 1995 (Sundance): August 11, 1995 (United States)
- Running time: 73 minutes
- Country: United States
- Language: English
- Box office: $2.5 million (US)

Unzipped is a 1995 American documentary film directed by Douglas Keeve.

== Synopsis ==
It follows fashion designer Isaac Mizrahi, Keeve's then boyfriend, as he plans and ultimately shows his fall 1994 collection. The film put such a rift in their relationship over Mizrahi's depiction that the two broke up over it.

There are appearances by supermodels Cindy Crawford, Naomi Campbell, Linda Evangelista and Kate Moss, as well as many other celebrities and designers from the fashion world and beyond. At the 1995 Sundance Film Festival, it won the Audience Award for U.S. Documentary, tied with Ballot Measure 9.

== Critical reception ==
Janet Maslin of The New York Times gave Unzipped a positive review. Calling the film a "crafty valentine to the fashion world in general and this irrepressible designer in particular", Maslin praised the film's tight structure and found Mizrahi an engaging personality. She concludes that Unzipped is a "smart, spiky documentary".

The film holds a rating of 78% on Rotten Tomatoes from 18 reviews.

== Home media ==
The film was released on LaserDisc in the U.S. by Miramax Home Entertainment on June 3, 1996. It then received a VHS release in 1998, and on January 13, 2004, was issued on DVD, with the film also receiving a DVD release in Region 2 (the United Kingdom).

On September 4, 2012, Lionsgate issued Unzipped on a 3-disc DVD pack titled "Passion for Fashion". The release included two other fashion-related titles (Ready to Wear and The September Issue).

Paramount Pictures has distributed the film on digital platforms since April 2020. On March 4, 2021, Unzipped was made available on their new streaming service Paramount+, as one of its inaugural launch titles. It was re-added to Paramount+ again in June 2022, as part of a Pride Month celebration. Paramount Home Entertainment reissued the film on DVD on June 15, 2021, with this being one of many Miramax home video reissues from this period. Paramount Home Entertainment also issued the film on Blu-ray in Japan on May 21, 2021.
