= Helena Christensen =

Danish fashion model (born 1968)

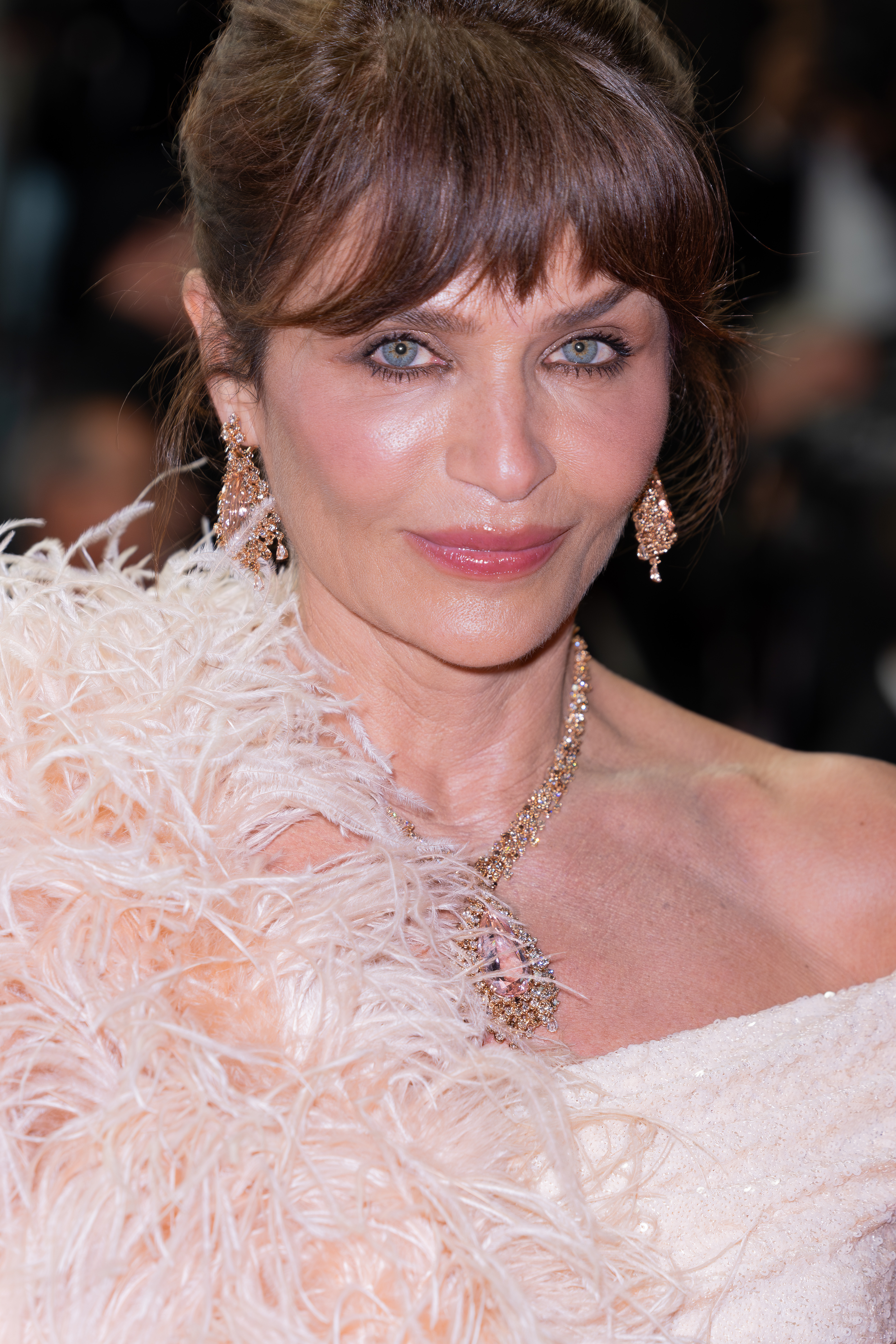
- Christensen in 2025
- Born: 25 December 1968 (age 57); Copenhagen, Denmark
- Occupation: Model
- Years active: 1986–present
- Partners: Michael Hutchence (1991–1995); Norman Reedus (1998–2003); Paul Banks (2008–2015)
- Children: 1
- Relatives: Oliver Sonne (nephew)
- Modeling information
- Height: 5 ft 10 in (1.78 m)
- Hair color: Brown
- Eye color: Green
- Agency: Unsigned Group (London); Women Management (New York); ZZO (Paris); d'management group (Milan); R1 Mgmt (Barcelona)

Helena Christensen (born 25 December 1968) is a Danish fashion model and beauty pageant titleholder. She is a former Victoria's Secret Angel, co-founder and original creative director for Nylon magazine, and she is a supporter of funding for breast cancer organizations and other philanthropic charities.

== Early life ==
Christensen was born on 25 December 1968 in Copenhagen, Denmark. Her father, Fleming, is Danish and her mother, Elsa, is Peruvian. She is the elder of two daughters. Christensen is fluent in Danish, English, French and German. Winning the Miss Universe Denmark crown in 1986, she subsequently represented Denmark in the Miss Universe 1986 pageant held in Panama. The following year, Christensen participated in the Look of the Year 1987 competition, where she was a finalist. She left home soon after to pursue modelling in Paris.

== Career ==
=== Modeling ===
Christensen rose to prominence in the 1990s, becoming one of the most popular models of her time. In 1990, she starred in the music video for Chris Isaak's song "Wicked Game". The video was later featured on MTV's "Sexiest Video of All-Time", voted #4 on VH1's "50 Sexiest Video Moments", and voted #13 on VH1's "100 Greatest Videos". She appeared on magazine covers including Vogue, Elle, Harper’s Bazaar, and W, and in fashion campaigns including Revlon, Chanel, Versace, Lanvin, Prada, Sonia Rykiel, Hermès, Valentino and Karl Lagerfeld. One noted campaign featured her in a 20 by 40 feet (6 by 12 m) billboard in Times Square, naked, "except for a strategically placed banana leaf." She was in the Victoria's Secret catalog and in their television commercials as one of the original "Angels", along with Tyra Banks, Karen Mulder, Daniela Peštová, and Stephanie Seymour. In 1996, Frank DeCaro of the New York Times cited Christensen, along with Linda Evangelista, Christy Turlington, Cindy Crawford, Naomi Campbell, Elle Macpherson and Claudia Schiffer, as "The Magnificent Seven". DeCaro reflected, "Known by their first names to legions of fans, they are the supermodel legends of the modern catwalk, the girl next door pretty underneath all the paint".

Christensen has continued to model. She graced the covers of Vogue Italia (2016), Portuguese Vogue (2016), British Tatler (2018), French Elle (2018). In September 2017, Christensen, along with Schiffer, Campbell, Crawford, and Carla Bruni, closed the Versace spring/summer 2018 fashion show, which was an homage to the late Gianni Versace and supermodel history. She walked the runway for Dolce & Gabbana and appeared in their spring/summer 2019 advertisement campaign with Carla Bruni, Eva Herzigová and Marpessa Hennink. Christensen is signed to ZZO Management in Paris, D Management in Milan, Unsigned Group in London and 1/One Management in New York City.

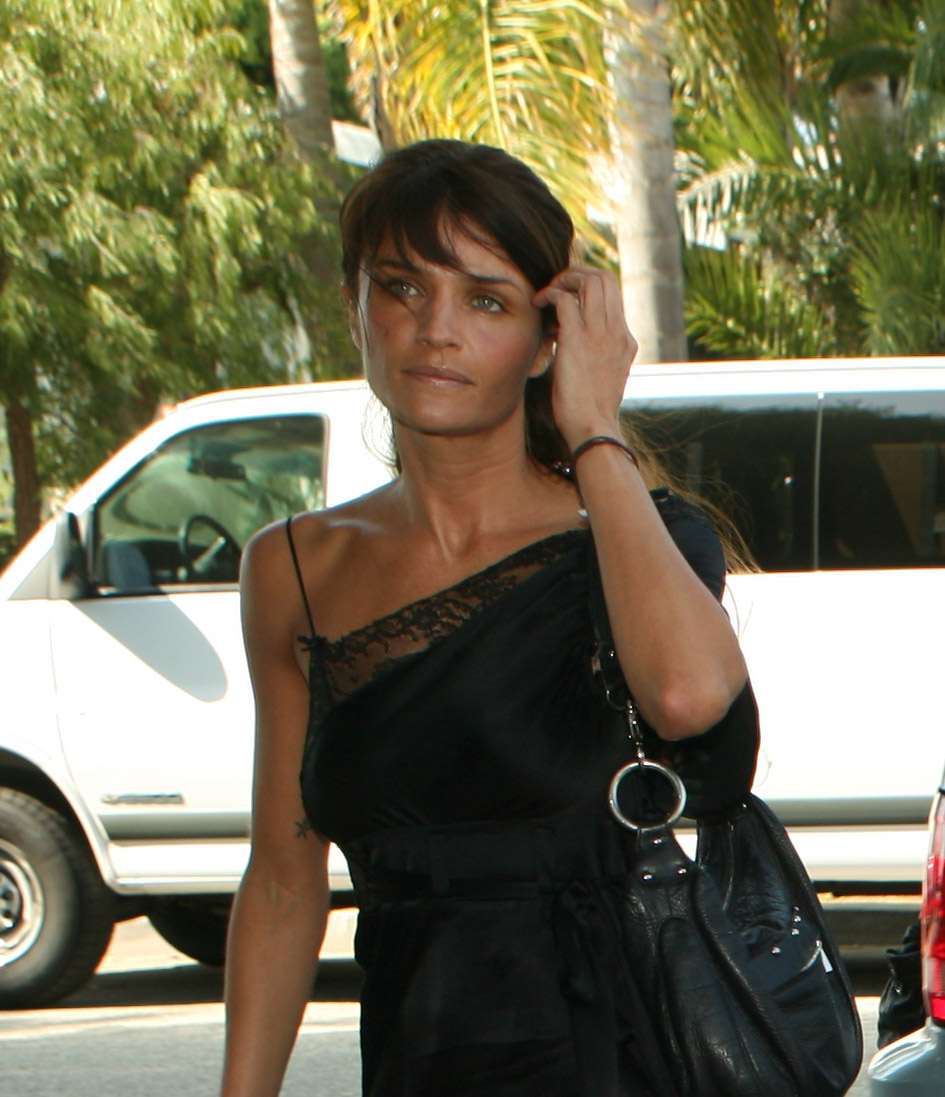
At a 2007 Sustainable/Green Home opening party

=== Business and photography ===
Christensen was co-founder and creative director of Nylon magazine in 1999 with Ray Gun publisher Marvin Scott Jarrett, and Kung Faux creator Mic Neumann. She launched her own clothing line, Christensen & Sigersen, with lifelong friend Leif Sigersen. The pair previously ran Butik, a shop in New York's West Village. Christensen created a vintage clothing line, sold in her mother's store, the Yo-Yo Second Hand Shop, in Christianshavn, Copenhagen, Denmark. In 2012, she created a lingerie collection, Helena Christensen for Triumph, for the UK-based lingerie brand. Christensen's collaboration with Triumph started in 2008 as the face of the Triumph brand.

Aside from her modeling work, Christensen is an accomplished photographer herself, whose work has appeared in Nylon, Marie Claire, and ELLE. Her exhibition "A Quiet Story," curated by Jim Cook, premiered at the Locus Gallery in Rotterdam, 2006, and HotelArena in Amsterdam, 2007. Her exhibition "Far From, Close" appeared at Dactyl Foundation in 2008–09, to benefit International Center of Photography educational programs and Chernobyl Children's Project International.

In 2014, Christensen worked on a photography series: Liberty Ross, Liv Tyler, and The Pursuit of Grace. "I like doing personal, very intimate projects that don't require a lot of pre-meetings".

Christensen has traveled extensively and often finds herself on both sides of the camera. In 2016, she was announced as the "Global Explorer" for the Luxury Collection Hotels and Resorts. Her major project for the company was documenting a trip from the seaside town of Paracas to the colonial city of Cusco and the nearby Urubamba Valley.

=== Climate change awareness ===
Christensen partnered with Oxfam in 2009 to document the impact of climate change in Peru, where her mother was born. "Climate change in Peru is already devastating and we welcome Helena's commitment to show this to the rest of the world," said Frank Boeren, Oxfam's coordinator in Peru. "Peru is on the frontline of climate change, along with other developing countries, which have played little part in causing the problem".

=== Breast cancer fundraising ===
In 2006, Christensen launched the second annual Fashion Targets Breast Cancer campaign, which involves the sale of designer t-shirts to raise money for Ireland's Action Breast Cancer and Europa Donna Ireland to help younger women with breast cancer.

== Personal life ==
Christensen dated and lived with INXS frontman Michael Hutchence on and off in France and Denmark for five years in the early 1990s. She was in a relationship with actor Norman Reedus for five years; they had a son together, Mingus (born October 1999), before they split in 2003. Later, she dated Interpol singer Paul Banks from 2011 to 2015. Christensen is the aunt of footballer Oliver Sonne. Besides football, Sonne also worked as a fashion model, like his aunt.

Christensen has an apartment in Copenhagen, a house in Catskill, New York, and lives in Manhattan, where she drives "the only type of car I've ever had", a Morris Minor. She reported in 2007 that she had been residing in Monaco.

In August 2025, her son Mingus was arrested in New York City and charged with third-degree assault, assault recklessly causing injury, criminal obstruction of breathing, second-degree harassment and aggravated harassment after he allegedly assaulted a woman in Manhattan's Chelsea neighborhood. Prior to this, Mingus had previously pled guilty in 2022 to assaulting a woman.
