= Lara Worthington =

Australian model and social media personality

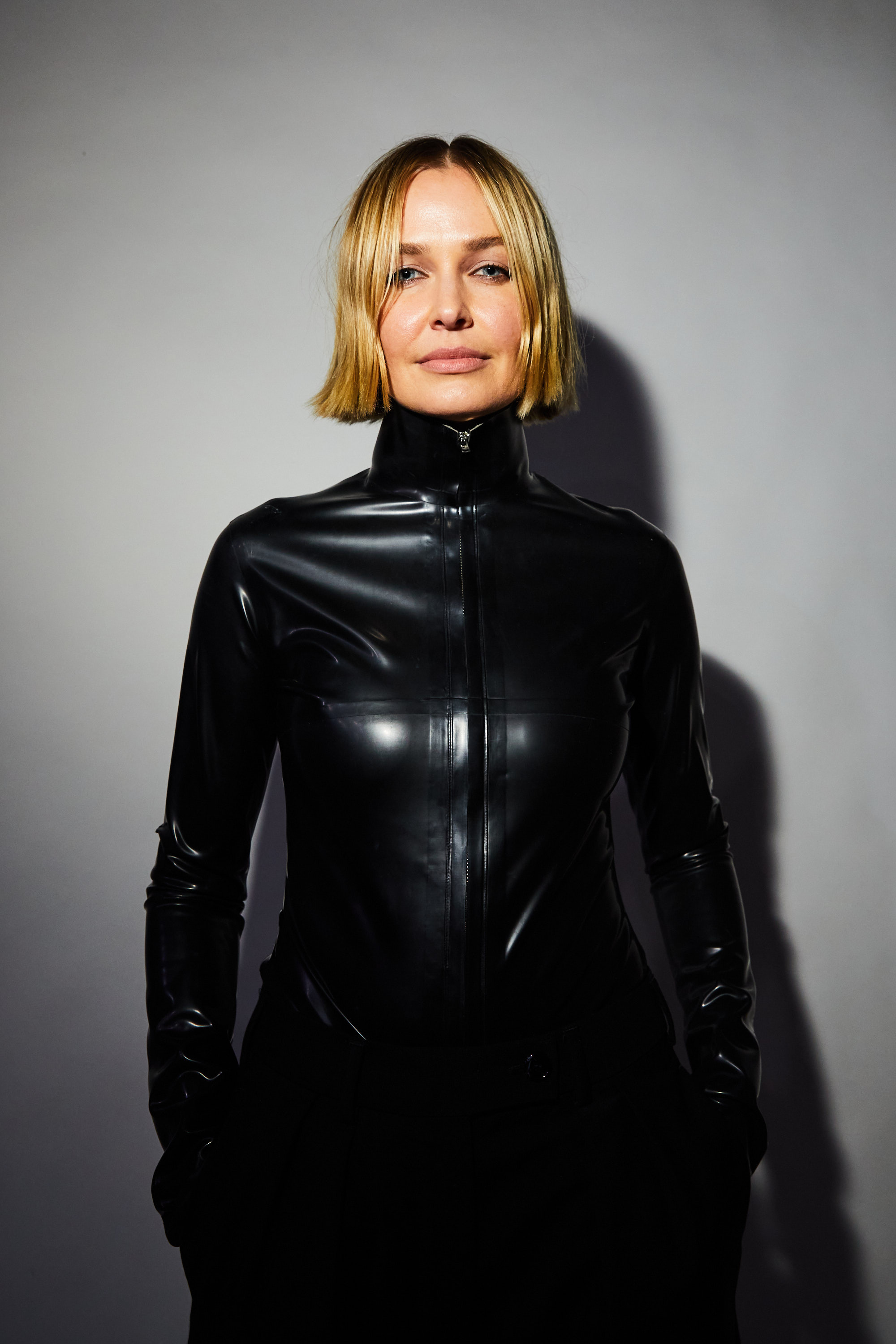
- Worthington at Australian Fashion Week in 2021
- Born: Lara Bingle; 22 June 1987 (age 39); Caringbah, New South Wales, Australia
- Occupations: Model; media personality
- Years active: 2006–present
- Spouse: Sam Worthington (m. 2014)
- Children: 3
- Modelling information
- Height: 5 ft 6 in (1.68 m)
- Hair colour: Blonde
- Eye colour: Blue

Lara Worthington (née Bingle) (born 22 June 1987) is an Australian model and media personality. She is known for appearing in the 2006 Tourism Australia advertising campaign So where the bloody hell are you?. Her own reality television series, Being Lara Bingle, premiered on Network Ten in June 2012, ending after one season.

== Early life ==
Bingle dropped out of school at 16 to move to Italy. Her father died in May 2008 from liver and pancreatic cancer.

== Career ==
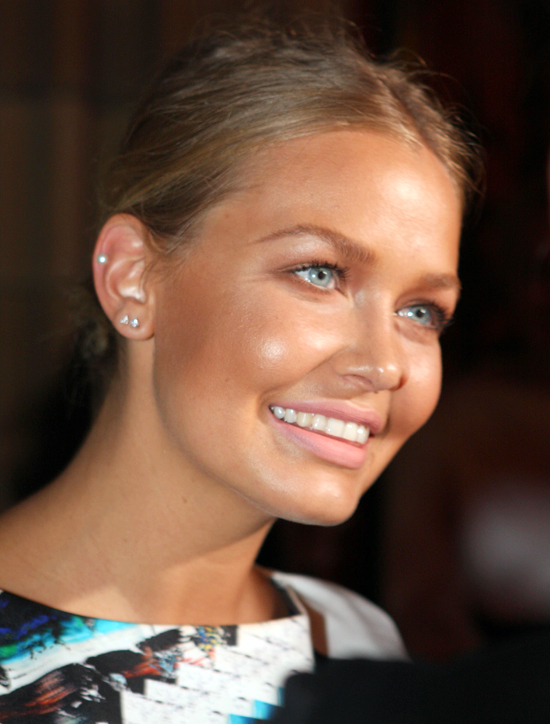
Bingle in November 2011

Worthington has been featured on the cover of Australian Harper's Bazaar, Elle, Grazia, Oyster and Cleo. Worthington has also appeared in episodes of Home and Away as well as The Celebrity Apprentice Australia and Australia's Next Top Model.

Worthington competed on the Nine Network's celebrity ice dancing show Torvill and Dean's Dancing on Ice, where she was the last woman to be eliminated and thus the runner-up in the series. She also appeared in the channel's ad for the 2006-2007 Ashes series. Nine re-hired Worthington in 2008 as a reporter for a new travel show, Holidays for Sale.

Worthington signed a one-year deal in 2008 with international phone company Vodafone as one of their official ambassadors. Worthington signed a three-year contract (2008–2011) with swimwear brand Speedo.

Since 2009, Worthington has been an ambassador for Bowel Cancer Australia. On 4 June 2010, Worthington officially launched the 2010, "Love My Family" ad campaign.

In August 2010, Worthington announced that she had signed with US model agency Elite Models.

Lara was announced as a contestant in the 2011 series of Dancing with the Stars. The series began airing in May. She was partnered with Carmelo Pizzino. Following her elimination from Dancing with the Stars on 26 June 2011, Bingle told The Kyle and Jackie O Show that she was shocked and upset at having been kicked off the show, given her competitive streak.

In December 2011, it was announced that Worthington had signed a development deal with Network Ten to star in her own reality television series. Ten commissioned a 10-episode reality television series. The series focuses on both Worthington's personal and professional life. For the series, Worthington relocated to an $8 million Bondi apartment in the hope of making the series more appealing for potential overseas TV buyers. The series Being Lara Bingle premiered on 12 June 2012 to over 925,000 viewers, exceeding expectations, but met with mixed reviews from critics, resulting in the show only lasting one season.

== Other ventures ==
Worthington announced in April 2011 a co-ownership in Growlers restaurant located in Torquay between her and Darryn Lyons. The restaurant was sold in 2013.

In August, 2010 and March, 2011, Worthington co-hosted Australia radio show the Kyle & Jackie O Show.

In January 2012, Worthington signed as a brand ambassador for coconut water brand H2Coco. Worthington appeared in a photoshoot in tropical Bali to kick off the brand's advertising campaign in Australia.

Lara has served as the face of Australian fashion chain Cotton On. In November 2014, Worthington launched a new tanning range called The Base. In 2019, Worthington's beauty brand became not-for-profit and re-branded as Share The Base. In 2021, Worthington was announced as beauty ambassador for Australian vitamin and beauty company Swisse.

== Personal life ==
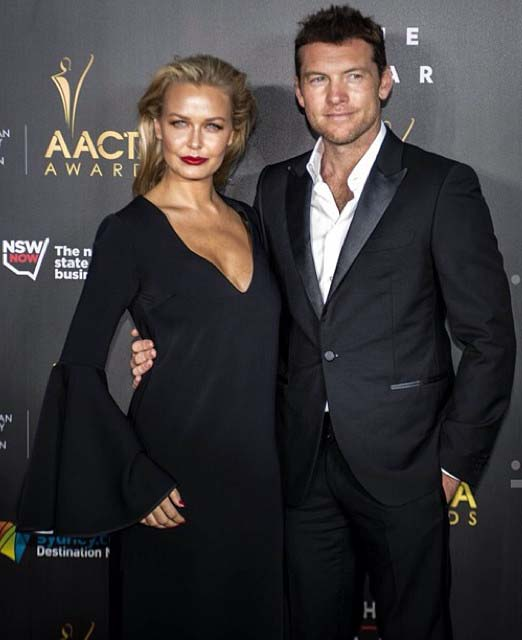
Bingle and her husband Sam Worthington at the 3rd AACTA Awards, 2014

She has one older brother, Josh Bingle.

In January 2008 Bingle and Australian cricketer Michael Clarke were confirmed as in a relationship. On 25 March 2008 it was announced that the pair were engaged after Clarke proposed in New York. Clarke's public relations firm announced the ending of the engagement on 12 March 2010.

On 18 October 2013, it was confirmed that Bingle was in a relationship with fellow Australian and actor Sam Worthington. Bingle announced in 2014 that she was re-locating from Sydney to New York City.

They married on 28 December 2014 and have three sons born in 2015, 2016, and 2020.

=== Legal issues ===
In May 2006, Bingle (now Worthington) took legal action against EMAP Australia, which had allegedly published photographs of the model without her permission in the 27 March 2006 issue of Australian men's magazine Zoo Weekly. Worthington claimed defamation by the manner in which the magazine published the photos.

On 2 March 2010, Worthington started proceedings to sue Brendan Fevola for breach of privacy, defamation and misuse of her image for the release of a nude photo in Woman's Day published on 1 March 2010. On 4 March 2010 it emerged that Worthington and her agent, Max Markson, had sold her story relating to this nude photo to the same magazine, Woman's Day, which had published the controversial photo, for nearly A$200,000. This raised considerable controversy because Worthington would discuss for profit a matter she considered serious enough to sue over and from which she claimed to be hurt.

While driving with a suspended licence in Bondi, New South Wales, on 14 May 2012, Worthington was involved in a traffic incident with a female motorcyclist and fled the scene without exchanging details with the injured rider. Appearing in Waverley Court on 18 September 2012, Worthington was fined $3,500 and received a further 12-month driving ban and an 18-month good behaviour bond. She had previously lost her licence because she had committed at least another six driving offences in 2012. On the same licence suspension, she was caught driving twice more in October and November 2013 and was given a six-month suspended jail sentence.

== Filmography ==
Television
Year	Show	Role	Notes
2006	Torvill and Dean's Dancing on Ice	Herself / Contestant	Sixth contestant eliminated
2008	Getaway	Herself / Guest reporter	One episode
2008	Holidays for Sale	Herself / Reporter	
2011	Dancing with the Stars	Herself / Contestant	Seventh contestant eliminated
2011	The Celebrity Apprentice Australia	Herself / Special guest	Challenge 7
2011	Australia's Next Top Model	Herself / Special guest	Season 7; episode 11
2012	The Project	Herself / Guest	One episode
2012	Being Lara Bingle	Herself	10 episodes
