= Marie Claire =

Monthly women's fashion magazine

- Cover of the March 2026 issue, Iza Dantas by Gleeson Paulino
- Editor: Katell Pouliquen
- Categories: Fashion
- Frequency: Monthly
- Paid circulation: 3,020,288
- Total circulation: 3,030,165 (2025)
- Founder: Jean Prouvost
- First issue: 5 March 1937; 89 years ago
- Company: Groupe Marie Claire
- Country: France
- Based in: Paris
- Language: French
- Website: marieclaire.fr
- ISSN: 0025-3049

Marie Claire (French pronunciation: [maʁi klɛʁ]; stylised in all lowercase) is a monthly women's fashion magazine. It has been published in France since 1937 and targets upper-income, educated women aged 22 to 49. Sister editions are published for children's fashion, DIY, food, interior design, runway collections, and wellness, alongside many foreign editions of the magazine.

== Background ==
Marie Claire is a French women's fashion magazine founded in 1937 by Jean Prouvost.

The magazine is a monthly publication, published twelve times per year for January, February, March, April, May, June, July, August, September, October, November, and December.

=== Circulation ===
Total circulation
Year	2016	2017	2021	2022	2023	2024	2025
Circulation	4,769,167	4,545,379	3,680,742	3,534,549	3,372,101	3,284,482	3,030,165

=== Editors ===
Editor	Start year	End year	Ref.
Marie Claire (1937–1944; 1954–present)
Marcelle Auclair	1937	1944	
Marcelle Auclair	1954		
Tina Kieffer	1999	2009	
Marianne Mairesse	2014	2020	
Katell Pouliquen	2020	present	
Marie Claire Maison (1967–present)
Anne Desnos	2008	present	
Marie Claire Idées (1998–present)
Camille Soulayrol	1998	present	
Marie Claire Enfants (2010–present)
Stéphanie Tortorici	2010	2013	
Violaine Belle-Croix	2013	present	
Marie Claire Style (2011–present)
Marianne Mairesse	2014	2019	
Katell Pouliquen	2020	present	
Marie Claire Respirations (2020–present)
Katell Pouliquen	2020	present	

== History ==
Marie Claire was founded by Jean Prouvost (1885–1978) and Marcelle Auclair (1899–1983). Its first issue appeared in 1937. In 1976, Prouvost retired and his daughter Évelyne took over the magazine and added L'Oréal Group to the company.

Brand owner Groupe Marie Claire also owned La Revue du vin de France, a wine magazine after the company acquired it in 2004.

Lagardère sold its 42% stake in Groupe Marie Claire back to Prouvost family in 2018.

== Marie Claire worldwide ==
Marie Claire has 32 editions worldwide:

- Marie Claire (for France, since 1937)
- Marie Claire Arabia (for Saudi Arabia, United Arab Emirates, Jordan and Lebanon, since 2012)
- Marie Claire Argentina (in the 1990s and since 2019)
- Marie Claire Australia (since 1995)
- Marie Claire Brasil (for Brazil, since 1991)
- Marie Claire België (for Belgium, since 2012)
- Marie Claire Belgique (for Belgium, from 1969 to c. 2008 and since 2012)
- Marie Claire China (since 2002)
- Marie Claire Colombia (from 1990 to 2019 and since 2024)
- Marie Claire Czech (for Czechia, from 2008 to 2020 and since 2021)
- Marie Claire Deutsch (for Germany, from 1990 to 2003 and since 2024)
- Marie Claire España (for Spain, since 1987)
- Marie Claire Greece (from 1988 to ? and since 2019)
- Marie Claire Hrvatska (for Croatia, since 2025)
- Marie Claire Italia (for Italy, since 1987)
- Marie Claire Japon (for Japan, 1982 to 2009 and since 2012)
- Marie Claire Kazakhstan
- Marie Claire Korea (for South Korea, since 1993)
- Marie Claire Lower Gulf (for the Arab Gulf, since 2013)
- Marie Claire México (for Mexico, from 1990 to 2020 and since 2021)
- Marie Claire Magyarország (for Hungary, since 2007)
- Marie Claire Netherlands (since 1990)
- Marie Claire Nigeria (since 2023)
- Marie Claire Russia (since 1997)
- Marie Claire Serbia (since 2023)
- Marie Claire Suisse (for Switzerland, since 2003)
- Marie Claire Taiwan (since 1993)
- Marie Claire Türkiye (for Turkey, since 1988)
- Marie Claire UK (for the United Kingdom, since 1988)
- Marie Claire Ukraine (since 2008)
- Marie Claire US (for the United States, since 1994)
- Marie Claire Vietnam (since 2025)

=== Ceased publication ===
- Marie Claire Chile (in the 1990s)
- Marie Claire Estonia (from 2007 to 2010)
- Marie Claire Hong Kong (from 1990 to 2024)
- Marie Claire India (from 2006 to 2013)
- Marie Claire Indonesia (from 2010 to 2019)
- Marie Claire Kuwait (from 2008 to ?)
- Marie Claire Malaysia (from 1994 to 2020)
- Marie Claire Philippines (from 2005 to 2009)
- Marie Claire Polska (from 1998 to 2006)
- Marie Claire Portugal (from 1988 to 2020)
- Marie Claire Puerto Rico
- Marie Claire Romania (from 2008 to 2019)
- Marie Claire Singapore (from 1992 to 1999)
- Marie Claire Syria (~2011)
- Marie Claire South Africa (from 1997 to 2018)
- Marie Claire Thailand (from 2004 to 2017)
- Marie Claire Venezuela (from 1990 to 2018)

== Worldwide editions ==
=== United States ===
The U.S. edition of the magazine was started by the Hearst Corporation, based in New York City, in 1994. Hearst has branch offices in France, Italy (where the company also published Marie Claire Italia), and several locations in the United States including Detroit, the West Coast, New England, the Midwest, the Southwest, and the Southeast. The Esquire Network reality television series Running In Heels follows three interns working in the NYC office of the magazine.

In October 2010, blog writer Maura Kelly posted an article on the magazine's website titled "Should Fatties Get A Room?" in which she expressed her disgust at the portrayal of overweight characters on TV, specifically on the sitcom "Mike and Molly." The post included the statements "I’d be grossed out if I had to watch two characters with rolls and rolls of fat kissing each other … because I’d be grossed out if I had to watch them doing anything" and "I find it aesthetically displeasing to watch a very, very fat person simply walk across a room." She also advised that "I think obesity is something that most people have a ton of control over. It’s something they can change, if only they put their minds to it." The post received a huge amount of backlash from readers, with thousands of comments posted in response on the magazine's website. Several news outlets reported on the posting, including CBS, The Today Show, Forbes, The Atlantic, and The Wall Street Journal.

In response to the widespread criticism, Kelly published another blog post in which she said she "regret(ted) that [her comments] upset people so much." She offered the excuse that she had once been anorexic, so her "extreme reaction" to fat people "might have grown out of my own body issues."

Marie Claire's editor in chief at the time, Joanna Coles, responded to criticism with "Maura Kelly is a very provocative blogger. She was an anorexic herself and this is a subject she feels very strongly about." As of 2024, the original post and its follow up are no longer available in Kelly's post archive on marieclaire.com.

The editor-in-chief from 2012 to 2020 was Anne Fulenwider. On 9 December 2019, Hearst Magazines announced that Fulenwider would be leaving her post at the end of the year. Aya Kanai, then chief fashion director of Hearst, was named the new editor of the women's magazine and started in January 2020. Sally Holmes took the helm in September from Aya Kanai, who surprised Hearst execs when she jumped ship to Pinterest after just nine months as editor in chief.

During the pandemic, Hearst quietly reduced the title's print frequency from 11 issues to seven in 2020 and instead launched its first digital issue with cover face Janet Mock. It also made Marie Claire's 2020 Power Trip virtual. Power Trip is an annual 36-hour, invite-only, all-expenses-paid networking conference for successful women across all industries that Fulenwider launched in 2016 as a way to make the magazine stand out in the event space. In May 2021, Future US acquired the American edition of Marie Claire from Hearst and has published it since June 2021. In September 2021, it was announced that the Summer 2021 issue of Marie Claire would be its last monthly print edition, and remaining subscribers would receive issues of Harper's Bazaar. That same year, Power Trip was once again an in-person experiential event. In June 2022, Future relaunched Marie Claire in print with its Beauty Changemakers Issue.

Through its digital edition, Marie Claire reported a reach of up to 15 million visitors per month.

=== United Kingdom ===
Marie Claire launched a UK print edition in 1988, with a website launched in 2006 featuring segments on daily news, catwalk shows, photographs and reports, fashion and beauty, buys of the day, daily horoscopes, and competitions.

Its cover price was increased in February 2018 from £3.99 to £4.20, but this did not compensate for a decline in sales and advertising revenue, with print display advertising down 25% in 2018 and 30% in 2019. In September 2019, the magazine's then owner, TI Media, announced that the final print edition would be published in November and the brand would become digital only, under license with Groupe Marie Claire. The UK website currently has two million monthly users.

Combined print and digital circulation from July to December 2018 was 120,133 per issue – almost a third of which were free copies, and 4,729 of which were for the digital edition. This was down on the same period in 2017, when the average circulation was 157,412, with 4,012 digital edition readers.

Marie Claire UK is published by Future Publishing, which acquired TI Media in 2020 and also owned Marie Claire US since 2021.

=== Australia ===
Marie Claire magazine is run by magazine and digital publisher Are Media, which acquired Pacific Magazines in 2020.

MarieClaire.com.au launched in 2016 after the digital rights were returned to Pacific Magazines from Yahoo and provides daily fashion, beauty, and lifestyle news. In March 2019, Marie Claire partnered with Salesforce.com to survey Australian women to analyse how attitudes have changed in the workplace.

=== Japan ===
The Japanese-language edition of Marie Claire, first published in 1982, was the first international edition published in a non-French speaking territory, as well as the first non-European edition, although it ceased publication after the 9 September issue went on sale in July 2009, due partly to the economic downturn.

Following a relaunch, since 2012, Marie Claire has been published in Japan under the name Marie Claire Style. This new format is offered as a free supplement in the Yomiuri Shimbun and distributed in wealthier suburbs of Japan. The magazine has now been made available at subway kiosks for a ¥200 cover price.

=== South Korea ===
The first South Korean edition of Marie Claire was published in March 1993 by MCK Publishing. Since 2012, the Marie Claire Film Festival has been held in South Korea.

=== Latin America ===
An international edition of Marie Claire has operated in Argentina under the Argentine publishing house Perfil since March 2019.

Other international, Latin editions of the magazine were published in Mexico by Grupo Televisa and also in Colombia but ceased publication by 2019 and 2020, but returned to Mexico in 2021 and Colombia in 2024.

== See also ==
- List of women's magazines
- List of Marie Claire cover models
