= Kai Z. Feng =

Chinese-born photographer

Kai Z. Feng (born 1982) is a Chinese-born photographer who has risen to become one of the most well-known fashion photographers from China at an international level. His work includes celebrity portraits and high fashion, shooting both commercial and editorial work for many international brands and publications.

== Early life ==
He was born in Shanghai, China in 1982 (Chinese name Feng Zhikai). Born into an ordinary Chinese family, he was exposed to a creative environment from a young age - his parents taught at Anhui Fine Arts College. He painted from a very young age and graduated from the Shanghai Arts and Crafts College with a major in fine art.

== Career ==
Feng's photography career began when he moved to London to be a graphic designer at the age of 18. During this time he took photos of friends aspiring to be models and for his own art projects. His photos were acknowledged by the modeling agency Select . By 24, he was injecting his style of artististic vision into the fashion world. His style quickly won him a major assignment with Burberry, with Feng being the first Chinese photographer to shoot for the brand. Following this he later shot for Aquascutum, Hugo Boss, Thomas Burberry, Shanghai Tang, Jaeger and Ben Sherman.

At just 29 years of age Kai has already become a regular contributor to Conde Nast publications such as Vogue USA, British Vogue, Vogue Australia, L'Uomo Vogue, Vogue China and GQ.

Feng has also garnered an international reputation for his portraiture work and has photographed many well-known names including Jennifer Lopez, Nicole Kidman, Cate Blanchett, Susan Sarandon, Hilary Swank, Bruno Mars, Katy Perry, Eva Mendes, Anna Paquin, Holly Hunter, Mischa Barton, Christopher Bailey, Katherine Jenkins, Nicholas Hoult, Jim Sturgess, Esperanza Spalding, Darren Criss, Troye Sivan and Amir Khan among others.

Recently he has featured in a charity promotional video for the brand Bvlgari.

== Personal life ==
Feng currently lives in Los Angeles, USA.
