= List of Vogue Greece cover models =

This list of Vogue Greece cover models (2000–2012; 2019–present) is a catalog of cover models who have appeared on the cover of Vogue Greece, the Greek edition of American fashion magazine Vogue. From 2000 to 2012 the magazine was named Vogue Hellas.

== 2000s ==
=== 2000 ===
Issue	Cover model	Photographer
March	Melanie McJannet	
April	Elsa Benítez	
May	Larissa Brown	
June	Gisele Bündchen	Steven Meisel
July	Amber Valletta	Raymond Meier
August	Aurélie Claudel	David Thompson
September	Carmen Kass	Steven Meisel
October	Gisele Bündchen	Steven Meisel
November	Maggie Rizer	Steven Klein
December	Gisele Bündchen	Terry Richardson

=== 2001 ===
Issue	Cover model	Photographer
January	Nicole Kidman	Annie Leibovitz
February	Karolína Kurková	Steven Meisel
March		
April		
May	Lindsay Frimodt	
June		
July	Karolína Kurková, uncredited male model	Mario Testino
August	Fabiana Tambosi	Thanassis Kaloyannis
September	Isabeli Fontana	Calliope
October	Karolína Kurková	Raymond Meier
November	Maggie Rizer	Steven Klein
December		

=== 2002 ===
Issue	Cover model	Photographer
January	Anna Vissi	Uli Weber
February	Gisele Bündchen	Steven Meisel
March	Karolína Kurková	Herb Ritts
April		
May	Karolína Kurková	Mario Testino
June	Jodie Kidd; Sakis Rouvas	
July	Karolína Kurková; Liya Kebede; Carmen Kass	Mario Testino
August	Gisele Bündchen	Nick Knight
September	Carolyn Murphy	Craig McDean
October	Anne Vyalitsyna	
November	Bridget Hall	Thomas Schenk
December	Chandra North	

=== 2003 ===
Issue	Cover model	Photographer
January	Maggie Rizer	Craig McDean
February		
March	Natalia Vodianova	Craig McDean
April	Carmen Kass	Mario Testino
May	Leilani Bishop; Isabeli Fontana	Steven Meisel
June	Cameron Diaz	Annie Leibovitz
July		
August	Milla Jovovich	Mario Testino
September		
October	Marianne Schröder	
November	Jacquetta Wheeler	Mario Testino
December		

=== 2004 ===
Issue	Cover model	Photographer
January	Uma Thurman	Annie Leibovitz
February	Hana Soukupová; Julia Stegner	Craig McDean
March	Daria Werbowy	Steven Meisel
April	Daria Werbowy	Inez & Vinoodh
May	Esther Cañadas	
June		
July	Adi Neumann	Thanassis Kaloyannis
August	Naomi Campbell	
September		
October	Gisele Bündchen	Craig McDean
November	Gemma Ward	Steven Meisel
December	Daria Werbowy	Steven Meisel

=== 2005 ===
Issue	Cover model	Photographer
January		
February		
March		
April	Valentina Zelyaeva	Anthony Ward
May	Gemma Ward	Mario Testino
June	Alison Renner	Nikos Papadopoulos
July	Gemma Ward	Troyt Coburn
August	Naomie Laan	
September	Caroline Trentini	Steven Meisel
October	Candice Swanepoel	Calliope
November		
December		

=== 2006 ===
Issue	Cover model	Photographer
January	Despina Vandi	
February	Sasha Pivovarova; Lily Donaldson	Steven Meisel
March	Carmen Kass	Craig McDean
April	Daria Werbowy	Mario Testino
May	Linda Vojtová	Calliope
June	Karolína Kurková	Kostas Avgoulis
July	Linda Vojtová	
August	Nynke van Verschuer	
September	Christy Turlington	Patrick Demarchelier
October	Lily Donaldson; Hilary Rhoda	Steven Meisel
November	Jessica Stam; Snejana Onopka; Sasha Pivovarova; Gemma Ward	Craig McDean
December		

=== 2007 ===
Issue	Cover model	Photographer
January	Christelle Lefranc	Kostas Avgoulis
February	Lydia Hearst	Paola Kudacki
March	Karin Andersson	Kostas Avgoulis
April	Caroline Trentini	Patrick Demarchelier
May	Karolína Kurková	
June	Natasha Poly	Inez & Vinoodh
July	Lonneke Engel	Kostas Avgoulis
August	Sasha Pivovarova	David Sims
September	Natasha Poly	Inez & Vinoodh
October	Caroline Trentini	Patrick Demarchelier
November	Julia Alexandratou	Kostas Avgoulis
December	Raquel Zimmermann	David Sims

=== 2008 ===
Issue	Cover model	Photographer
January	Vicky Kaya	Kostas Avgoulis
February	Natalia Vodianova	Steven Meisel
March	Daria Werbowy	Patrick Demarchelier
April	Raquel Zimmermann	Kostas Avgoulis
May	Daria Werbowy	Inez & Vinoodh
June	Rebecca Iannacone	
July	Isabeli Fontana	Patrick Demarchelier
August	Karina Gubanova	Kostas Avgoulis
September	Gisele Bündchen	David Sims
October	Emma Karlsson	Troyt Coburn
November	Sasha Pivovarova	David Sims
December	Natalia Vodianova	Patrick Demarchelier

=== 2009 ===
Issue	Cover model	Photographer
January	Anna Kuznetsova	Kostas Avgoulis
February	Carmen Kass	Kostas Avgoulis
March	Isa Asklöf	Kostas Avgoulis
April	Agyness Deyn	Patrick Demarchelier
May	Edita Vilkevičiūtė	Patrick Demarchelier
June	Ismini Papavlasopoulou; Anastasia Perraki; Evagelia Aravani; Vaso Kollida	Mara Desipris
July	Alana Kuznetsova	Mara Desipris
August	Eden Clark	Nikos Papadopoulos
September	Margaryta Senchylo	
October	Margaryta Senchylo	
November	Katia Zygouli	Mara Desipris
December	Carmen Kass	

== 2010s ==
=== 2010 ===
Issue	Cover model	Photographer
January	Helena Schroder	Nikos Papadopoulos
February	Kasia Struss	David Sims
March	Caroline Winberg	Kostas Avgoulis
April	Caroline Winberg	Kostas Avgoulis
May	Josefine Ekman Nilsson	Mara Desipris
June	Natasha Poly	Inez & Vinoodh
July	Constance Jablonski	Regan Cameron
August	Yulia Mizhuy	Kostas Avgoulis
September	Dorothea Mercuri	Federico de Angelis
October	Constance Jablonski	Alexi Lubomirski
November	Edita Vilkevičiūtė	Camilla Åkrans
December	Madisyn Ritland	Kostas Avgoulis

=== 2011 ===
Issue	Cover model	Photographer
January	Eleni Menegaki	Kostas Avgoulis
February	Anna Zakusylo	Katerina Tsatsanis
March	Daria Werbowy	Mario Sorrenti
April	Candice Swanepoel	Steven Meisel
May	Bregje Heinen	Thanassis Krikis
June	Constance Jablonski	Alex Cayley
July	Valeriya Melnik	Thanassis Krikis
August	Karmen Pedaru	Cedric Buchet
September	Sophie Holmes	Federico de Angelis
October	Ieva Lagūna	Koray Birand
November	Aymeline Valade	Giampaolo Sgura
December	Heather Marks	Koray Birand

=== 2012 ===
Issue	Cover model	Photographer
January	Ros Georgiou	Thanassis Krikis
February	Anabel van Toledo	Kostas Avgoulis
March	Arizona Muse	Patrick Demarchelier
April	Alys Hale	Kostas Avgulis
May	Valerie van der Graaf	Mara Desipris
June	Jessica Stam	Koray Birand
July	Ros Georgiou	Thanassis Krikis
August	Sophie Vlaming	Dimitris Skoulos
September	Ollie Henderson	Errikos Andreou
October	Julija Steponavičiūtė	Kostas Avgulis
November	Eri Polychronidou	Kostas Avgulis

=== 2019 ===
Issue	Cover model	Photographer
April	Bella Hadid	Txema Yeste
May	Sasha Pivovarova	Alique
June	Laurijn Bijnen	Richard Phibbs
July	Aymeline Valade	Yorgos Lanthimos
July	Stella Lucia	Yorgos Lanthimos
August/September	Alessandra Ambrosio	Sonia Szóstak
October	Denise Gough	Boo George
October	Emily DiDonato	Kat Irlin
October	Julia Hafstrom	Dionisis Andrianopoulos
November	Amanda Murphy	Hugh Lippe
November	Grace Bol	Richard Phibbs
December 2019/January 2020	Amanda Wellsh	Dionisis Andrianopoulos

== 2020s ==
=== 2020 ===
Issue	Cover model	Photographer
February	Winnie Harlow	Vasilis Kekatos
March	Victoria Beckham	Alexi Lubomirski
April	Bella Hadid	Chris Colls
May	Heloise Guerin	Victor Demarchelier
May	Julia van Os	Max Papendieck
May	Sasha Pivovarova	Igor Vishnyakov
June	Candice Huffine	Nico Bustos
July/August	Esther Mastroyianni	Dionisis Andrianopoulos
July/August	Ros Georgiou	Thanassis Krikis
September	Greta Varlese	Dionisis Andrianopoulos
October	Georgina Grenville	Dionisis Andrianopoulos
November	Sharon Stone	Michael Muller
December	Joan Smalls; Candice Swanepoel; Irina Shayk	Rowan Papier

=== 2021 ===
Issue	Cover model	Photographer
January/February	Diane Kruger	Mark Selliger
January/February	Taylor Hill	Nico Bustos
January/February	Twiggy	Nick Haddow
March	Ariane Labed	Ros Georgiou
April	Karen Elson	Sebastian Kim
May	Regina King	Sonia Szóstak
June	Hanne Gaby Odiele	Phil Pointer
July/August	Meghan Roche	Nico Bustos
September	Jourdan Dunn	Álvaro Beamud Cortés
October	Carmen Kass	Thanassis Krikis
November	Jared Leto	Chris Colls
December	Jessica Chastain	Ned Rogers

=== 2022 ===
Issue	Cover model	Photographer
January/February	Julia Louis-Dreyfus	Leeorwild
March	Marie Cecile Inglesi; Nikisathina; Jess Bean	Thanassis Krikis
March	Titilinakos @weareonlyscience Olivia Kaiafa; Mariza Panousi	Thanassis Krikis
March	Georgia Kaltsi; Maria Gkoutsiou; Matina Kostiani; Margarita Priftaki	Thanassis Krikis
March	Magaajyia Silberfeld; Diane Alexandre; Iro Karavia	Thanassis Krikis
April	Carla Bruni; Helena Christensen	Nico Bustos
May	Jennifer Connelly	Mark Selliger
June	Edita Vilkevičiūtė	Álvaro Beamud Cortés
July/August	Luna Bijl	Panos Davios
September	Sara Grace Wallerstedt	Christopher Papakaliatas
September	Christopher Papakaliatas	Christopher Papakaliatas
October	Eddie Redmayne	Johan Sandberg
November	Kate Hudson	Michael Schwartz
December	Olivier Rousteing; Dove Cameron	Álvaro Beamud Cortés
December	Ros Georgiou	Thanassis Krikis
December	Christian Louboutin	Thanassis Krikis

=== 2023 ===
Issue	Cover model	Photographer
January	Lily Collins	Cameron McCool
February	Eleni Foureira	Álvaro Beamud Cortés
March	Monica Belluci	Ellen von Unwerth
April	Heidi Klum	Arseny Jabiev
May	Haris Alexiou; Manos Theofilou	Johan Sandberg
June	Aymeline Valade	Johan Sandberg
July/August	Jessica Stam	Panos Davios
September	Kim Cattrall	Charlie Gray
October	Anna Vissi	P.A. Hüe de Fontenay
November	Eva Green	Ellen von Unwerth
December	Anna Cleveland	Richard Phibbs

=== 2024 ===
Issue	Cover model	Photographer
January	Kris Grikaite	Richard Phibbs
February	—N/a	Lena Kitsopoulou
March	Adèle Exarchopoulos	Álvaro Beamud Cortés
April	Naomi Campbell	Nick Knight
May	Christoforos Papakaliatis	Richard Phibbs
June	Sun Mizrahi	Phil Poynter
July/August	Emmanouil Zerdevas; Konstantinos Genidounias; Dimitrios Skoumpakis; Efstathios Kalogeropoulos; Ioannis Fountoulis; Ros Georgiou uncredited Dimitris Nikolaidis; Alexandros Papanastasiou uncredited	Richard Phibbs
July/August	Miltos Tentoglou; Esther Mastroyianni	Richard Phibbs
July/August	Lefteris Petrounais; Danae Lumani	Richard Phibbs
July/August	Francesco Ruggiero; Anna Korakaki	Richard Phibbs
July/August	Konstantina Pliatsika; Stefanos Ntouskos	Richard Phibbs
September	Sara Blomqvist	Vassilis Karidis
September	Steinberg	Johan Sandberg
September	Malika El Maslouhi	Alessandro Burzigotti
October	Beauïse Genç	Phil Poynter
October	Maike Inga	Panos Davios
November	Cindy Bruna	Gregorie Alexandre
December	Daisy Edgar-Jones	Tarek Mawad

=== 2025 ===
Issue	Cover model	Photographer
January	Anthi Fakidari	Thanassis Krikis
February	Isabelle Huppert	Tarek Mawad
March	Aylda Grace Carder	Panos Davios
March	Hannah Motler	Gregorie Alexandre
March	Annabel Van Tilborg	Stefano Galuzzi
April	Joanna Paliospirou	Anna Daki
May	Daphné Patakia	P.A. Hüe de Fontenay
June	Marina Satti	Cedric Buchet
July/August	Nora Attal	Hordur Ingason
September	Hanne Gaby Odiele	Vassilis Karidis
October	Naomi Watts	Domen & Van De Velde
November	Kimberly Guilfoyle	Platon
December	Leighton Meester	Domen & Van De Velde

=== 2026 ===
Issue	Cover model	Photographer
January	Camille Chifflot	P.A. Hüe de Fontenay
February	Esther Mastroyianni	Maria Magdalinou
February	Anthi Fakidari	Maria Magdalinou
February	Nassia Matsa	Maria Magdalinou
February	Ros Georgiou	Maria Magdalinou
March	Carolyn Murphy	Rowan Papier
April	Nicole Scherzinger	Paola Kudacki
May	Camila Morrone	Emma Summerton
June	Luna Bijl	Panos Davios
June	Francesco Ruggiero	Panos Davios
July/August	Kate Kraaijeveld	Thanassis Krikis
September	Lara Menezes	Branislav Šimončík
October	Lily James	Sofia Sanchez & Mauro Mongiello
November	Philippine Leroy-Beaulieu	Branislav Šimončík
