= List of L'Officiel Philippines cover models =

Cover of the September 2024 issue

This list of L'Officiel Philippines cover models (2015–2017; 2021–present) is a catalog of cover models who have appeared on the cover of L'Officiel Philippines, the Philippine edition of French fashion magazine L'Officiel. From 2015 to 2017 the magazine was published as L'Officiel Manila, and from 2021 to 2022 the magazine was published as L'Officiel PH.

== 2010s ==
=== 2015 ===
Issue	Cover model	Photographer	Ref.
May	Daria Avidenko	Mark Nicdao	
June	Gabriele Dubois	Mark Nicdao	
July	Marga Esquivel	Markus Ziegler	
September	Ros Georgiou	Markus Ziegler	
October	Tanya S	Mark Nicdao	
November	Olivia Medina	Mark Nicdao	
December/January 2016	Bea Valdes	Mark Nicdao	

=== 2016 ===
Issue	Cover model	Photographer	Ref.
February	Betina Ocampo	Ralph Mendoza	
March	Margaret Zhang	Margaret Zhang	
April	Alicia Vikander		
May	Solenn Heussaff		
June	Coco Rocha	Ralph Mendoza	
July/August	Jess Connelly	Ralph Mendoza	
September	Kim Jones	Shaira Luna	
October	Liza Soberano	Chuck Reyes	
November	Karlie Kloss	Margaret Zhang	
December/January 2017	Armi Millare		
December/January 2017	Paolo Roldan, Sharina Gutierrez, Marga Esquivel, Philippe Escalambre	Danilo Hess	

=== 2017 ===
Issue	Cover model	Photographer	Ref.
February	Rina Fukushi		
March	Martine Cajucom		
April	Charlene Almarvez		
May	Anne Curtis		
June	Karolína Kurková	Damien Krisl	
July/August	Maureen Wroblewitz	Regine David	
July/August	Cenon Normal, Mav Bernardo		

== 2020s ==
=== 2021 ===
Issue	Cover model	Photographer	Ref.
Spring	Nadine Lustre	Regine David	
Spring	Yumi Lambert	Alberto Maria Colombo	
Spring	Lucas, Kun, Ten, Winwin, Xiaojun, Hendery, Yangyang (WayV)		
Summer	Mark Tuan, Winnie Harlow	Emman Montalvan	
Fall	Emma Chamberlain	Graham Dunn	
Fall	Lee Jong-suk		
Fall	Liza Soberano		
Fall	Jessica Chastain		
Winter	Catriona Gray		
Winter	Ji Chang-wook		

=== 2022 ===
Issue	Cover model	Photographer	Ref.
January (Men's Special Edition)	Jin, Suga, J-Hope, RM, Jimin, V, Jung Kook (BTS)	Hyea W. Kang	
Spring	Maine Mendoza		
Spring	Heeseung, Jay, Jake, Sunghoon, Sunoo, Jungwon, Ni-Ki (Enhypen)		
Summer	Jackson Wang		
Summer	Anne Curtis		
Fall	Heart Evangelista		
Fall	Cha Eun-woo		
Fall	Jach Manere, Bethany Talbot, Jella Omolaoye, Siobhan Moylan	Renzo Navarro	
Winter	Kai		
Winter	CL		

=== 2023 ===
Issue	Cover model	Photographer	Ref.
Spring	Kim Jones		
Spring	Mingyu		
Spring	Pia Wurtzbach		
Summer	India Amarteifio		
Summer	Heart Evangelista, Nadine Lustre, Bea Alonzo		
Summer	Janine Guitierrez		
September	Kathryn Bernardo, Dolly de Leon		
October	Valerie Celis, Sharina Gutierrez, Hannah Locsin		
December/January 2024	Anne Curtis		

=== 2024 ===
Issue	Cover model	Photographer	Ref.
March	Park Gyu-young		
April	Gulf Kanawut		
May	Blythe		
June/July	Michelle Marquez Dee		
August	Liza Soberano		
September	Ashanti Beltran, Teodora Cordial, Justine Llarena, Chrysler Logica, Queenie Salmon		
October	Pia Wurtzbach		
November	Niana Guerrero	Cenon At Mav	
December/January 2025	Marian Rivera	Andrea Beldua	

=== 2025 ===
Issue	Cover model	Photographer	Ref.
February	Heart Evangelista	Charisma Lico	
March	Lilli Zoe, Seng Khan, Nyouma Tacheboubet	Alexandre Roy-Gilbert (Royal Gilbert)	
April	Solenn Heussaff	Renzo Navarro	
May	Gabbi Garcia	Charisma Lico	
June/July	Jullian Culas, Taki Shimada, Renée Mai, Suraj Aku, Cassandra Lucas, Rayana Eissa	BJ Pascual	
August	Kaila Estrada	Renzo Navarro	
September	Janine Gutierrez	Cenon at Mav	
October	Anne Curtis	Sutthiwat Sangkong	
November	Pia Wurtzbach Jauncey	Alexis Dave Co	
December/January 2026	Siobhan Moylan	Lawrence de Leon	

=== 2026 ===
Issue	Cover model	Photographer	Ref.
February	Brent Manalo, Mika Salamanca	BJ Pascual	
March	Nadine Lustre	Karl King Aguña	
April	Rocio Zobel	Charisma Lico	
May	Kylie Verzosa	BJ Pascual	
June/July	Atasha Muhlach	BJ Pascual	
August	Tia Lee	Reuben Foong	
September	Marian Rivera	Mark Nicdao	
October	Keanna Stroh, Raven Doctor, Eska Lhian, Cathrina Torres, Habie Mondido, Kate Ang	Karl King Aguña	
November	Kelsey Merritt	Danilo Hess	

== See also ==
- List of Vogue Philippines cover models
