= Lists of Vogue cover models =

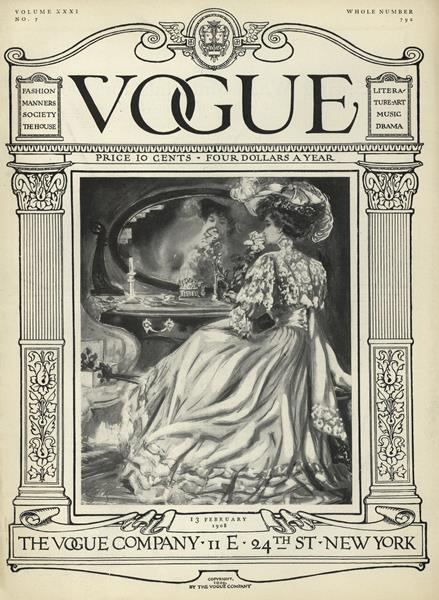
1908 cover

The lists of Vogue cover models give the models for the covers of Vogue magazine. The magazine has different editions in different countries, and the lists are broken down by country.

== Models by country ==
- List of Vogue (US) cover models
- List of Vogue Adria cover models
- List of Vogue Arabia cover models
- List of Vogue Australia cover models
- List of Vogue Brasil cover models
- List of British Vogue cover models
- List of Vogue China cover models
- List of Vogue Czechoslovakia cover models
- List of Vogue Deutsch cover models
- List of Vogue España cover models
- List of Vogue France cover models
- List of Vogue Greece cover models
- List of Vogue Hong Kong cover models
- List of Vogue India cover models
- List of Vogue Italia cover models
- List of Vogue Japan cover models
- List of Vogue Korea cover models
- List of Vogue México cover models
- List of Vogue Nederland cover models
- List of Vogue Philippines cover models
- List of Vogue Polska cover models
- List of Vogue Russia cover models
- List of Vogue Scandinavia cover models
- List of Vogue Singapore cover models
- List of Vogue Taiwan cover models
- List of Vogue Thailand cover models
- List of Vogue Türkiye cover models
- List of Vogue Ukraine cover models

== Other editions ==
- List of Teen Vogue cover models
