= List of Vogue Korea cover models =

This list of Vogue Korea cover models is a catalog of cover models who have appeared on the cover of Vogue Korea, the Korean edition of Vogue magazine, starting with the magazine's first issue in August 1996.

== 1990s ==
=== 1996 ===
Issue	Cover model	Photographer
August	Linda Evangelista	Mark Abrahams
September	Christy Turlington	Regan Cameron
October	Claudia Schiffer	Marc Hispard
November	Beverly Peele	Daniela Federici
December	Isabella Rossellini	Daniela Federici

=== 1997 ===
Issue	Cover model	Photographer
January	Madonna	Steven Meisel
February	Winona Ryder	Steven Meisel
March	Chandra North & Carolyn Murphy	Mark Abrahams
April	Naomi Campbell	
May	Elsa Benítez	Tom Munro
June	Kylie Bax	François Rotger
July	Georgina Grenville	Steven Meisel
August	Uma Thurman	Steven Meisel
September	Stella Tennant	Mark Abrahams
October	Kate Moss	Mark Abrahams
November	Amber Valletta & Linda Evangelista	Steven Meisel
December	Stella Tennant	Steven Meisel

=== 1998 ===
Issue	Cover model	Photographer
January	Shalom Harlow & Georgina Grenville	Steven Meisel
February	Spice Girls	Mario Testino
March	Cameron Diaz	Steven Meisel
April	Kate Moss & Amber Valletta	Steven Meisel
May	Amber Valletta	Steven Meisel
June	Elizabeth Hurley	Steven Meisel
July	Kate Moss	Nick Knight
August	Gwyneth Paltrow	Mario Testino
September	Carolyn Murphy	Steven Meisel
October	Angela Lindvall; Bridget Hall; Carolyn Murphy	Tom Munro
November	Sandra Bullock	Steven Meisel
December	Amber Valletta	Steven Meisel

=== 1999 ===
Issue	Cover model	Photographer
January	Hillary Clinton	Annie Leibovitz
February	Nicole Kidman	Tom Munro
March	Linda Evangelista	Raymond Meier
April	Ling Tan	Tyen
May	Maggie Rizer & Kate Moss	Steven Meisel
June	Carmen Kass	Steven Meisel
July	Angela Lindvall	Tom Munro
August	Gisele Bündchen	Steven Meisel
September	Carolyn Murphy	Steven Meisel
October	Gwyneth Paltrow	Steven Meisel
November	Gisele Bündchen	Jean-Baptiste Mondino
December	Kate Moss; Gisele Bündchen; Lauren Hutton; Iman; Naomi Campbell; Stephanie Seymour; Amber Valletta; Christy Turlington; Claudia Schiffer; Lisa Taylor; Paulina Porizkova; Carolyn Murphy; Patti Hansen	Annie Leibovitz

== 2000s ==
=== 2000 ===
Issue	Cover model	Photographer
January	Winona Ryder	Steven Meisel
February	Gisele Bündchen & Carmen Kass	Steven Meisel
March	Angela Lindvall	Steven Meisel
April	Amber Valletta	Steven Meisel
May	Audrey Marnay	Phil Poynter
June	Gisele Bündchen	Steven Meisel
July	Gisele Bündchen & George Clooney	Herb Ritts
August	Anne-Catherine Lacroix; Hannelore Knuts; Roos van Bosstraeten	
September	Trish Goff	Lee Jenkins
October	Gwyneth Paltrow	Mario Testino
November	Charlize Theron	Herb Ritts
December	Carmen Kass; Angela Lindvall; Maggie Rizer; Frankie Rayder	Annie Leibovitz

=== 2001 ===
Issue	Cover model	Photographer
January	Carmen Kass	Steven Meisel
February	Nicole Kidman	Annie Leibovitz
March	Karolína Kurková	Steven Meisel
April	Naomi Campbell	Jong Yong Sun
May	Renée Zellweger	Herb Ritts
June	Carmen Kass	Herb Ritts
July	Gisele Bündchen	Steven Meisel
August	Catherine Zeta-Jones	Herb Ritts
September	Amber Valletta	Steven Meisel
October	Linda Evangelista	Steven Meisel
November	Nadja Auermann	Steven Meisel
December	Britney Spears	Herb Ritts

=== 2002 ===
Issue	Cover model	Photographer
January	Gisele Bündchen	Steven Meisel
February	Stella Tennant	Steven Meisel
March	Linda Evangelista	Steven Meisel
April	Gwyneth Paltrow	Herb Ritts
May	Angelina Jolie	Annie Leibovitz
June	Amber Valletta & Carolyn Murphy	Steven Meisel
July	Natalie Portman	Steven Klein
August	Trish Goff	Craig McDean
September	Jennifer Aniston	Mario Testino
October	Kate Hudson	Herb Ritts
November	Christy Turlington	Steven Klein
December	Catherine Zeta-Jones & Renée Zellweger	Annie Leibovitz

=== 2003 ===
Issue	Cover model	Photographer
January	Carmen Kass	Steven Meisel
February	Sandra Bullock	Steven Meisel
March	Natalia Vodianova	Steven Meisel
April	Amber Valletta	Steven Meisel
May	Natalia Vodianova	Steven Meisel
June	Cameron Diaz	Annie Leibovitz
July	Reese Witherspoon	Steven Klein
August	Natalia Vodianova	Steven Meisel
September	Carolyn Murphy	Steven Meisel
October	Nicole Kidman	Annie Leibovitz
November	Gwyneth Paltrow	Mario Testino
December	Uma Thurman	Annie Leibovitz

=== 2004 ===
Issue	Cover model	Photographer
January	Natalia Vodianova	Annie Leibovitz
February	Renée Zellweger	Steven Klein
March	Natalie Portman	Mario Testino
April	Angelina Jolie	Mario Testino
May	Daria Werbowy	Mario Testino
June	Lily Cole	Steven Meisel
July	Liya Kebede	Steven Meisel
August	Karen Elson	Steven Meisel
September	Karen Elson & Liya Kebede	Craig McDean
October	Gisele Bündchen	Craig McDean
November	Daria Werbowy; Natalia Vodianova; Gisele Bündchen	Steven Meisel
December	Charlize Theron	Mario Testino

=== 2005 ===
Issue	Cover model	Photographer
January	Cate Blanchett	Annie Leibovitz
February	Gemma Ward	Craig McDean
March	Daria Werbowy	Steven Klein
April	Gemma Ward & Karen Elson	Craig McDean
May	Gemma Ward	Javier Vallhonrat
June	Daria Werbowy	Steven Meisel
July	Gisele Bündchen; Daria Werbowy; Natalia Vodianova	David Sims
August	Heather Marks & Lisa Cant	Jono Lee
September	Riley Keough	
October	Natalia Vodianova	Steven Meisel
November	Devon Aoki	David Byun
December	Lisa Cant; Hye-rim Park; Polina Kouklina	Hyung Won Ryoo

=== 2006 ===
Issue	Cover model	Photographer
January	Jessica Stam	David Byun
February	Sienna Miller	Mario Testino
March	Vlada Roslyakova	Tesh
April	Hye-rim Park	Oh Joong-seok
May	Shalom Harlow	Tesh
June	Keira Knightley	Mario Testino
July	Uma Thurman	Mario Testino
August	Song Kyung-a; Jang Yoon-ju; Kim Won Kyung; Han Hye-jin; Park Hee Hyun	Hee Hyun Park
September	Sasha Pivovarova	Tesh
October	Han Hye-jin & Solange Wilvert	Hyung Won Ryoo
November	Hilary Rhoda; Lily Donaldson; Gemma Ward	Steven Meisel
December	Lily Donaldson	David Byun

=== 2007 ===
Issue	Cover model	Photographer
January	Nicole Kidman	Mario Testino
February	Milla Jovovich	Tesh
March	Han Hye-jin	Hyung Won Ryoo
April	Jessica Stam	Alex Cayley
May	Coco Rocha	Alex Cayley
June	Song Hye-kyo	Paolo Roversi
July	Keira Knightley	Arthur Elgort
August	Coco Rocha & Daul Kim	Hyung Won Ryoo
September	Agyness Deyn	Tony Kim
October	Hye-rim Park	Oh Joong-seok
November	Caroline Trentini	Craig McDean
December	Coco Rocha	David Byun

=== 2008 ===
Issue	Cover model	Photographer
January	Hilary Rhoda	Alex Cayley
February	Natalia Vodianova	Steven Meisel
March	Doutzen Kroes	Andreas Sjödin
April	Hye-rim Park & Hyoni Kang	Hyung Won Ryoo
May	Han Hye-jin; Song Kyung-a; Daul Kim; Lee Hyun-yi; Kim Won Kyung; Lee Ji-yeon	Lee Gun-ho
June	Caroline Trentini	Tesh
July	Natalia Vodianova	Steven Meisel
August	Coco Rocha	Tony Kim
September	Chanel Iman	Oh Joong-seok
October	Carla Bruni	Annie Leibovitz
November	Iekeliene Stange	Oh Joong-seok
December	Zhang Ziyi	Oh Joong-seok

=== 2009 ===
Issue	Cover model	Photographer
January	Agyness Deyn	David Byun
February	Sasha Pivovarova	Patrick Demarchelier
March	Freja Beha Erichsen	Jason Kibbler
April	Sophie Marceau	Hong Jang Hyun
May	Anja Rubik	Jason Kibbler
June	Han Hye-jin; Lee Hyun-yi	Hyea W. Kang
July	Sasha Pivovarova	Arthur Elgort
August	Claudia Schiffer; Eva Herzigová; Naomi Campbell	John-Paul Pietrus
September	Zhang Ziyi	Cho Sun-hee
October	Coco Rocha	Tony Kim
November	Lee Byung-hun; Josh Hartnett	Sunhi Zo
November	Josh Hartnett; Hye-rim Park	Arthur Elgort
December	Yuhiung Youn; Misook Lee; Hyunjung Ko; Jiwoo Choi; Minhee Kim; Okvin Kim	Yongho Kim
December	Karlie Kloss	Rafael Stahelin

== 2010s ==
=== 2010 ===
Issue	Cover model	Photographer
January	Sasha Pivovarova	Craig McDean
February	Kasia Struss	David Sims
March	Kim Tae-hee	Oh Joong-seok
April	Abbey Lee Kershaw	Rafael Stahelin
May	Gisele Bündchen	Nino Muñoz
June	Anja Rubik	Paolo Roversi
July	Natasha Poly	Mario Sorrenti
August	Natalia Vodianova	Paolo Roversi
September	Freja Beha Erichsen	Rafael Stahelin
October	Magdalena Frackowiak	Giampaolo Sgura
November	Constance Jablonski	Rafael Stahelin
December	Sasha Pivovarova	Patrick Demarchelier

=== 2011 ===
Issue	Cover model	Photographer
January	Karen Elson & Tom Ford	Steven Meisel
February	Hanne Gaby Odiele	Tesh
March	Tang Wei & Hyun Bin	Cho Sun-ee
April	Sasha Pivovarova	Nino Muñoz
May	Han Hye-jin; Lee Hyun-yi; Hye Jung Lee	Paolo Roversi
June	Alexa Chung	Alan Gelati
July	Isabeli Fontana	Mert and Marcus
August	Han Hye-jin	Hong Jang-hyun; Kim Bo-sung; Kim Sang-gon
August	Jang Yoon-ju	Kim Young-jun & Park Ji-hyuk
August	Kim Won Kyung	Oh Joong-seok & Hyung Won Ryoo
August	Hye Jung Lee	Hyea W. Kang; Tae Woo; Cho Sun-hee
August	Lee Hyun-yi	Han Jong-chul; Jono Lee; Lee Gun-ho
August	Song Kyung-a	Bo Lee & Choi Yong-bin
September	Arizona Muse	Victor Demarchelier
October	Karen Elson	Rafael Stahelin
November	Mariacarla Boscono	Rafael Stahelin
December	Song Hye-kyo	Paolo Roversi

=== 2012 ===
Issue	Cover model	Photographer
January	Arizona Muse	Inez & Vinoodh
February	Kasia Struss	Rafael Stahelin
March	Karlie Kloss	Rafael Stahelin
April	Daphne Groeneveld	Rafael Stahelin
May	Saskia de Brauw	Paolo Roversi
June	Han Hye-jin	Hyea W. Kang
July	Gisele Bündchen	Inez and Vinoodh
August	Lara Stone	Hong Jang-hyun
September	Arizona Muse	Alexi Lubomirski
October	Anja Rubik	Rafael Stahelin
November	Carolyn Murphy	Cass Bird
December	Cara Delevingne	Sofia Sanchez and Mauro Mongiello

=== 2013 ===
Issue	Cover model	Photographer
January	Ji Hye Park & Sunghee Kim	Lee Gun-ho
February	Małgosia Bela	Rafael Stahelin
March	Daria Strokous; Doutzen Kroes; Joan Smalls; Kati Nescher; Saskia de Brauw	Danielle and Iango
April	Lindsey Wixson	Rafael Stahelin
May	Léa Seydoux	Tae Woo
June	Soo Joo Park	Hyea W. Kang
July	Miranda Kerr	Eric Guillemain
August	G-Dragon & Ji Hye Park	Kim Young-jun
August	G-Dragon & Soo Joo Park	Hong Jang-hyun
August	G-Dragon & Sunghee Kim	Kim Bo-sung
September	Jun Ji-hyun	Hong Jang-hyun
October	Karen Elson	Cass Bird
November	Aymeline Valade	Rafael Stahelin
December	Arizona Muse	Will Davidson

=== 2014 ===
Issue	Cover model	Photographer
January	Anja Rubik	Alexi Lubomirski
February	Kasia Struss	Rafael Stahelin
March	Suki Waterhouse	Rafael Stahelin
April	Suvi Koponen	Benny Horne
May	Karlie Kloss	Sebastian Kim
June	Yuna Kim	Lee Gun-ho
July	Lindsey Wixson	Nagi Sakai
July	Yeo Hye Won; Taeyang; HoYeon Jung; Seon Hwang; Choi Ara	Hong Jang-hyun
August	Anja Rubik; Candice Swanepoel; Joan Smalls; Karen Elson; Lily Donaldson	Sebastian Kim
September	Song Hye-kyo & Kang Dong-won	Hong Jang-hyun
October	Sam Rollinson	Rafael Stahelin
November	Caroline Trentini	Steven Pan
December	Sasha Pivovarova	Jason Kibbler

=== 2015 ===
Issue	Cover model	Photographer
January	Hanne Gaby Odiele & G-Dragon	Young Kyu Yoo
February	Andreea Diaconu	Alexi Lubomirski
March	Saskia de Brauw	Cass Bird
April	Abbey Lee Kershaw	Rafael Stahelin
May	Sasha Pivovarova	Sebastian Kim
June	Aymeline Valade	Cass Bird
July	Big Bang; Han Kyung Hyun; HoYeon Jung; Lee Ho-jung	Hong Jang-hyun
July	Toni Garrn	Hyea W. Kang
August	Tilda Swinton	Hong Jang-hyun
September	Amber Valletta	Scott Trindle
October	Yoo Ah-in	Cho Sun-hee
November	Rosie Huntington-Whiteley	Sebastian Kim
December	Lindsey Wixson	Jun Seob Yoon

=== 2016 ===
Issue	Cover model	Photographer
January	Daphne Groeneveld	Jun Seob Yoon
February	Lexi Boling	Cass Bird
March	Lara Stone	Emma Tempest
April	Ruth Bell	Hyea W. Kang
May	Carolyn Murphy	Hyea W. Kang
June	Ha Jung-woo & Kim Min-hee	Hyung Won Ryoo
July	Victoria Beckham	Hyea W. Kang
August	Soo Joo Park	Karl Lagerfeld
August	G-Dragon	Karl Lagerfeld
August	Hye Seung Lee, Ji Hye Park, & Sora Choi	Karl Lagerfeld
August	G-Dragon	Karl Lagerfeld
August	Ji Hye Park, Sung Hee Kim, G-Dragon, Soo Joo Park, Hye Seung Lee, & Hyun Ji Shin	Karl Lagerfeld
September	Nicolas Ghesquière & Bae Doona	Patrick Demarchelier
October	Grace Hartzel	Hyea W. Kang
November	Yoon Young Bae; Hyun Ji Shin; Sora Choi	Kim Bo-sung
December	Lady Jean Campbell	Hyea W. Kang
December	Yoo Ah-in	Lee Shin-goo

=== 2017 ===
Issue	Cover model	Photographer
January	Milla Jovovich	Mario Sorrenti
February	Sasha Pivovarova	Peter Ash Lee
March	Natalie Westling	Hyea W. Kang
April	EXO	Young Kyu Yoo
May	Freja Beha Erichsen	Hyea W. Kang
June	Léa Seydoux	Patrick Demarchelier
July	Tilda Swinton	Sølve Sundsbø
August	Liya Kebede	Hyea W. Kang
September	Gigi Hadid	Henrique Gendre
October	Vittoria Ceretti	Hyea W. Kang
November	Song Hye-kyo	Hyea W. Kang
December	Yasmin Wijnaldum	Steven Pan

=== 2018 ===
Issue	Cover model	Photographer
January	Bella Hadid	Ahn Joo-young
February	Jonas Glöer & Kiki Willems	Peter Ash Lee
March	Kendall Jenner	Hyea W. Kang
April	Stella Tennant	Hyea W. Kang
May	Sara Grace Wallerstedt; Adut Akech; HoYeon Jung	Peter Ash Lee
June	Grace Elizabeth	Hyea W. Kang
July	Luna Bijl	Hyea W. Kang
August	Sehun; Sara Grace Wallerstedt	Hong Jang-hyun
September	Lily-Rose Depp	Paolo Roversi
October	Mica Argañaraz	Hyea W. Kang
November	HoYeon Jung; Hyun Ji Shin; So Hyun Jung; Sora Choi; Yoon Young Bae	Tae Kyun Kim
December	Yoo Ah-in & Vincent Cassel	Victor Santiago

=== 2019 ===
Issue	Cover model	Photographer
January	Coco Capitán & Frances Wilks	Coco Capitán
February	Mariacarla Boscono	Hyea W. Kang
March	Anok Yai	Hyea W. Kang
April	Mariam de Vinzelle; Alyssa Sardine; Clementine Balcaen; Krow Kian	Hyea W. Kang
May	Cara Delevingne	Ahn Joo-young
June	Heejung Park & Bomi Youn	Hong Jang-hyun
July	Kristen Stewart	Hyea W. Kang
August	Sora Choi	Hyea W. Kang
September	Kang Daniel; Melany Rivero Bonitto; Sarah Wilson	Hong Jang-hyun
October	Amber Valletta	Hyea W. Kang
November	Vittoria Ceretti	Hyea W. Kang
December	Saskia de Brauw	Peter Ash Lee

== 2020s ==
=== 2020 ===
Issue	Cover model	Photographer
January	Saoirse Ronan	Hyea W. Kang
February	Riccardo Tisci & Rianne Van Rompaey	Luigi & Iango
March	Blackpink	Petra Collins
April	Bella Hadid	Luigi & Iango
May	Jennie	Hong Jang-hyun
June	Bae Suzy; Hyun Ji Shin	Hyea W. Kang
July	Kim Tae-ri	Hong Jang-hyun
August	Park Bo-gum	Hong Jang-hyun
September	G-Dragon	G-Dragon
October	Binx Walton	Luigi & Iango
November	G-Dragon	Hong Jang-hyun
December	Liya Kebede	Chris Colls

=== 2021 ===
Issue	Cover model	Photographer
January	Soo Joo Park	Sebastian Kim
February	Sora Choi	Hyea W. Kang
March	Hyun Ji Shin	Hyea W. Kang
April	Raquel Zimmermann	Chris Colls
May	Edie Campbell	Felix Cooper
June	Blackpink	Kim Hee June
July	HoYeon Jung	Hyea W. Kang
August	Rianne Van Rompaey; Sora Choi; Mona Tougaard	Nicolas Ghesquière
September	Song Hye-kyo	Jongha Park
October	Chloe Oh	Kim Yeong-jun
November	HoYeon Jung	Hyea W. Kang
December	Meadow Walker; Quinn Mora; Yoonmi Sun; Georgia Palmer	Cho Gi-seok

=== 2022 ===
Issue	Cover model	Photographer
January	BTS	Hyea W. Kang
February	Rebecca Longendyke	Luigi & Iango
March	Chloe Magno; J Moon; Jan Baiboon; Jay Pak; Kayako Higuchi; Mao Xiaoxing	Felix Cooper
April	Jisoo	Dukhwa Jang
April	Iris Law	Hyea W. Kang
May	Lady Jean Campbell	Hyea W. Kang
June	Veronika Kunz	Hyea W. Kang
July	G-Dragon	Kim Hee June
August	Hoyeon Jung	Cho Gi-seok
September	América González	Hyea W. Kang
October	V (Kim Tae-hyung)	Ahn Jooyoung
November	IU	Daehan Chae
December	Anja Rubik	Peter Ash Lee

=== 2023 ===
Issue	Cover model	Photographer
January	Ive	Kim Hee June
January	Cho Gue-sung	Dukhwa Jang
January	Lulu; Sua; Yeri	Kim Hee June
February	Jennie	Kim Hee June
March	Steinberg	Felix Cooper
April	Jimin	Hyea W. Kang
May	Lila Moss	Luigi & Iango
June	RM (Kim Nam-joon)	Dukhwa Jang
July	Mika Schneider; Lulu Tenney; Selena Forrest; Chloe Oh	Hyea W. Kang
August	Jun Ji-hyun	Ahn Joo-young
September	Mariacarla Boscono	Luigi & Iango
September	Lee Kang-in	Dukhwa Jang
October	Jungkook	Jongha Park
October	Exclusive covers for Miu Miu	
October	Lulu Wood, Baye Seye	Peter Ash Lee
October	Yura Poslaster, Ellis Ahn	Peter Ash Lee
October	Sascha Alexandra Lilja, Edoardo Duse	Peter Ash Lee
October	Anyier Anei, Kim Hoyong	Peter Ash Lee
October	Sihana Shalaj, Rubuen Bilan-Carroll	Peter Ash Lee
November	Naomi Campbell	Giseok Cho
December	América González	Hyea W. Kang, Giseok Cho

=== 2024 ===
Issue	Cover model	Photographer
January	Lulu Tenney	Davit Giorgadze
February	Georgia Palmer	Hyea W. Kang
March	Taeyeon	Park Jongha
March	Sora Choi	Park Jongha
March	Hyun Ji Shin	Ahn Jooyoung
March	Pak Se-ri	Ahn Jooyoung
March	Chloe Oh	Peter Ash Lee
March	Greta Lee	Peter Ash Lee
March	Go Hyun-jung	Hong Jang Hyun
March	CL	Hong Jang Hyun
March	Jang Won-young	Kim Hee June
March	Yuna Kim	Kim Hee June
March	Kim Min-ha	Kim Hee June
March	Jeon So-mi	Kim Hee June
March	Kim Da-mi	Yoon Jiyong
March	Ahn Yu-jin	Yoon Jiyong
March	Park Gyu-young	Jang Dukhwa
March	Krystal Jung	Jang Dukhwa
March	Lee Ha-nee	Kim Yeongjun
March	Hong Jin-kyung	Kim Yeongjun
March	Bae Doona	Mok Jungwook
March	Koo Jeong A	Kirsty Sim
March	Yeo Seo-jeong	Hyea W. Kang
March	Uhm Jung-hwa	Kim Sunhye
March	Kang Sue-jin	Pak Bae
March	Hyein (NewJeans)	Pak Bae
April	Vittoria Ceretti	Luigi & Iango
May	Jennie Kim	Kim Hee June
June	Nora Attal	Hyea W. Kang
July	Mona Tougaard	Sean and Seng
August	Irina Shayk	Philip-Daniel Ducasse
September	Aespa	Hyea W. Kang
October	Lisa	Jang Duk Hwa
November	Iris Law	Hyea W. Kang
December	Isabelle Huppert	Pak Bae
December	Amelia Gray	Luigi & Iango
December	Gigi Hadid	Keaton Manning, Michael Elmquist

=== 2025 ===
Issue	Cover model	Photographer
January	Minji, Hanni, Danielle, Haerin, Hyein	Siyoung Song
February	G-Dragon	Heejune Kim
March	Lee Young-ae	Hyea W. Kang
March	Yoon Young Bae	Hyea W. Kang
March	Son Ye-jin	Mok Jungwook
March	Sana	Mok Jungwook
March	Yuna Kim	Ahn Jooyoung
March	Han Hyo-joo	Ahn Jooyoung
March	Minnie	Yoon Songyi
March	Sim Chae Kyung	Yoon Songyi
March	Krystal Jung	Kim Hee June
March	Jung Yu-mi	Kim Hee June
March	Lydia Ko	Kim Hee June
March	Park Gyu-young	Jang Dukhwa
March	Go Hyun-jung	Kim Yeongjun
March	Chaeyoung	Sangmi An
March	Sae Eun Park	Peter Ash Lee
March	Jang Won-young	Yoon Jiyong
March	Lee Su Hyun	Pak Bae
March	Peggy Gou	Park Jong-ha
March	Chloe Oh	Kipyung Chang
March	Yoonmi, Joan, Dohyun	Less
April	Jisoo	Go Won-Tae
May	Lulu Tenney	Louise & Maria
June	Illit	Mok Jung-wook
June	Mathilda Gvarliani	Luigi & Iango
July	Songah Woo, Junyeong Baek, Rosalieke Fuchs, Ella Dalton, Pierrick Gregoire	Yookeun Lim
July	AllDay Project	Park Jong-ha
August	Rosé	Kim Hee June
September	Edie Campbell	Sean + Seng
October	Song Hye-kyo	Kim Hee June
November	Ida Heiner	Sean + Seng
December	Hoyeon Jung	Jeff Henrikson
December	Felix	Park Jongha

=== 2026 ===
Issue	Cover model	Photographer
January	Greta Lee	Pak Bae
February	Alex Consani	Sean + Seng
February	Jimin	Mok Jungwook
March	Kim Do-yeon	
March	Park Gyu-young	
March	Kim You-jung	
March	Nora Noh	
March	Gawon	
March	Youn Yuh-jung	Mok Jungwook
March	Maggie Kang	Hyea W. Kang
March	Seo Hyun-jin	
March	Sora Choi	
March	Ella Gross	
March	Kim Yuna	
March	Kim Hye-soo	Mok Jungwook
March	Shin Hye-sun	
March	Shim Eun-kyung	
March	Yerin Ha	
March	Lee Na-young	Kim Hee June
March	Annie Moon	
April	Jacqui Hooper	Sean + Seng
May	Mathilda Gvarliani	Felix Cooper
June	Tilda Swinton	Malick Bodian
June	G-Dragon	Kim HeeJune
July	Bhavitha Mandava	Hyea W. Kang
July	Song Ah Woo, Hyun Ji Shin, Soo Joo Park, Stephanie Cavalli	Hyea W. Kang
July	Rosé	Vitali Gelwich
August	Bibi Breslin	Hyea W. Kang
August	Esther Kim	Hyea W. Kang
August	Felice Nova Noordhoff	Hyea W. Kang
August	Chloe Oh	Hyea W. Kang
August	Soo Joo Park	Hyea W. Kang
August	Luíza Perote	Hyea W. Kang
August	Natasha Poly	Hyea W. Kang
August	Hyun Ji Shin	Hyea W. Kang
September	Lisa	Yoon Ji Yong
October	Sora Choi	Mok Jungwook
November	Jun Ji-hyun	Kim Hee June
December	Jungkook	Lim Yookeun
