= Fukushi =

Fukushi (written: 福士) is a Japanese surname. Notable people with the surname include:

- Fukushi Masaichi (福士 政一, 1878–1956), Japanese physician and pathologist
- Fukushi Ochiai (落合 福嗣, born 1987), Japanese voice actor
- Kayoko Fukushi (福士 加代子, born 1982), Japanese long-distance runner
- Rina Fukushi (福士 リナ, born 1999), Japanese model
- Seiji Fukushi (福士 誠治, born 1983), Japanese actor
- Sota Fukushi (福士 蒼汰, born 1993), Japanese actor
