= Cassidi =

Israeli clothing company

Cassidi דן קסידי בע"מ
- Company type: Private company
- Industry: Fashion
- Founded: 1993; 33 years ago in Tel Aviv, Israel
- Headquarters: Rishon Lezion, Israel
- Area served: Israel; Bulgaria
- Key people: Moshe Ben Shitrit (Founder and CEO); Asher Ben Shitrit(CEO Director)
- Products: Clothing, fashion accessories
- Number of employees: 230
- Website: www.cassidiboutique.com

Cassidi (Hebrew: קסידי) is an Israeli clothing company specializing in women's fashion.

== History ==
The chain has 35 stores, with locations in Israel and Bulgaria. It is owned by the Cassidi and Ben Shitrit families. In 2010, the chain expanded its activity in Eastern Europe with a third store in a new outlet mall in the Bulgarian capital of Sofia.

== Spokesmodels ==
- Linda Vojtová

== See also ==
- Israeli fashion
- Economy of Israel
