= List of Vogue Philippines cover models =

Fashion magazine cover models list

This list of Vogue Philippines cover models (2022–present) is a catalog of cover models who have appeared on the cover of Vogue Philippines, the Philippine edition of American fashion magazine Vogue.

== 2022 ==
Issue	Cover model	Photographer	Ref.
September	Chloe Magno	Sharif Hamza	
October	Ica Dy	Koji Arboleda	
November	Alex Eala	Edgar Berg	
December/January 2023	Anne Curtis	Mark Nicdao	

== 2023 ==
Issue	Cover model	Photographer	Ref.
February	H.E.R.	Shaira Luna	
March	Daniela Szpejna; Jasmyn Palombo	Sharif Hamza	
April	Apo Whang-Od (Note: Record for the oldest Vogue cover model at 106 years old.)	Artu Nepomuceno	
May	Sai Versailles; Juliana Gomez; Brisa Amir; Gianne Encarnacion; Daphne Chao; Siobhan Moylan	Sharif Hamza	
June	Bretman Rock	Regine David	
July	Aliah Canillas	Artu Nepomuceno	
August	Dr. Dolores Ramirez	Artu Nepomuceno	
September	Joann Bitagcol; Lukresia; Rina Fukushi	Sharif Hamza	
October	Sarina Bolden; Inna Palacios; Hali Long; Chandler McDaniel; Olivia McDaniel	Shaira Luna	
October	Megan Young; Catriona Gray; R'Bonney Gabriel; Melanie Marquez; Michelle Dee	Shaira Luna	
November	Heart Evangelista	Fabien Montique	
December/January 2024	Gemma Cruz-Araneta	Lloyd Ramos	

== 2024 ==
Issue	Cover model	Photographer	Ref.
February	Ann Dumaliang; Billie Dumaliang; Issa Barte; Bella Tanjutco; Tasha Tanjutco	Artu Nepomuceno	
March	Nadine Lustre	Allyssa Heuzé	
March	Karen Davila; Nanette Medved	Colin Dancel	
April	Shaira Ventura	Mark Nicdao	
May	Rosie Godwino Sula	Gabriel Nivera	
June	Isabel Sandoval	Kim Jones	
July	Hidilyn Diaz	Mark Nicdao	
July	Bianca Bustamante	Sharif Hamza	
August	Pia Wurtzbach	Callum Inskip	
September	Laura Jhane	Renzo Navarro	
October	Lea Salonga	Artu Nepomuceno	
October	Dolly de Leon	Artu Nepomuceno	
November	BINI	Renzo Navarro	
December/January 2025	Eva Noblezada	Harold Julian	

== 2025 ==
Issue	Cover model	Photographer	Ref.
February	Lake Cabrias	Borgy Angeles	
March	Hailee Steinfeld	Greg Swales	
April	Jane Goodall	Artu Nepomuceno	
May	Pom Klementieff	Domen + Van De Velde	
May	Pom Klementieff	Craig OBrien	
June	Anna Bayle	Mark Seliger	
July/August	Brett Prendergast; Bronson Garel; Sandra Drifter	Charles Lu	
July/August	Xiuli Jiang	Als Sunxiaoran	
July/August	Jo Ann Bitagcol	Chienyun	
September	Ikit Agudo	Chi Geotina, RJ Yerg	
October	Bella Poarch	Mark Nicdao	
November	Alexis Gutierrez; Agatha Gutierrez	Camille du Pont	
December/January 2026	Suganya	Karl King Aguña	

== 2026 ==
Issue	Cover model	Photographer	Ref.
February	Towa Bird	Richie Talboy	
March	Autumn Durald Arkapaw	Hannah Reyes Morales	
April	Maria Isabela Galeria	Artu Nepomuceno, Chi Geotina	
May	Laufey	Daniel Jack Lyons	
June/July	Chloe Magno	Artu Nepomuceno	
August	Mireille Aurelia	Kenza Le Bas	
August	H.E.R., Liza Soberano (Note: Special edition)	Sharif Hamza	
September/October	Olivia Rodrigo	Szilveszter Makó	
November	Marjay Ramirez	Karl King	

== See also ==
- List of L'Officiel Philippines cover models
