= Jaroslav Ježek Conservatory =

Music school in Prague, Czech Republic

- Konzervatoř Jaroslava Ježka

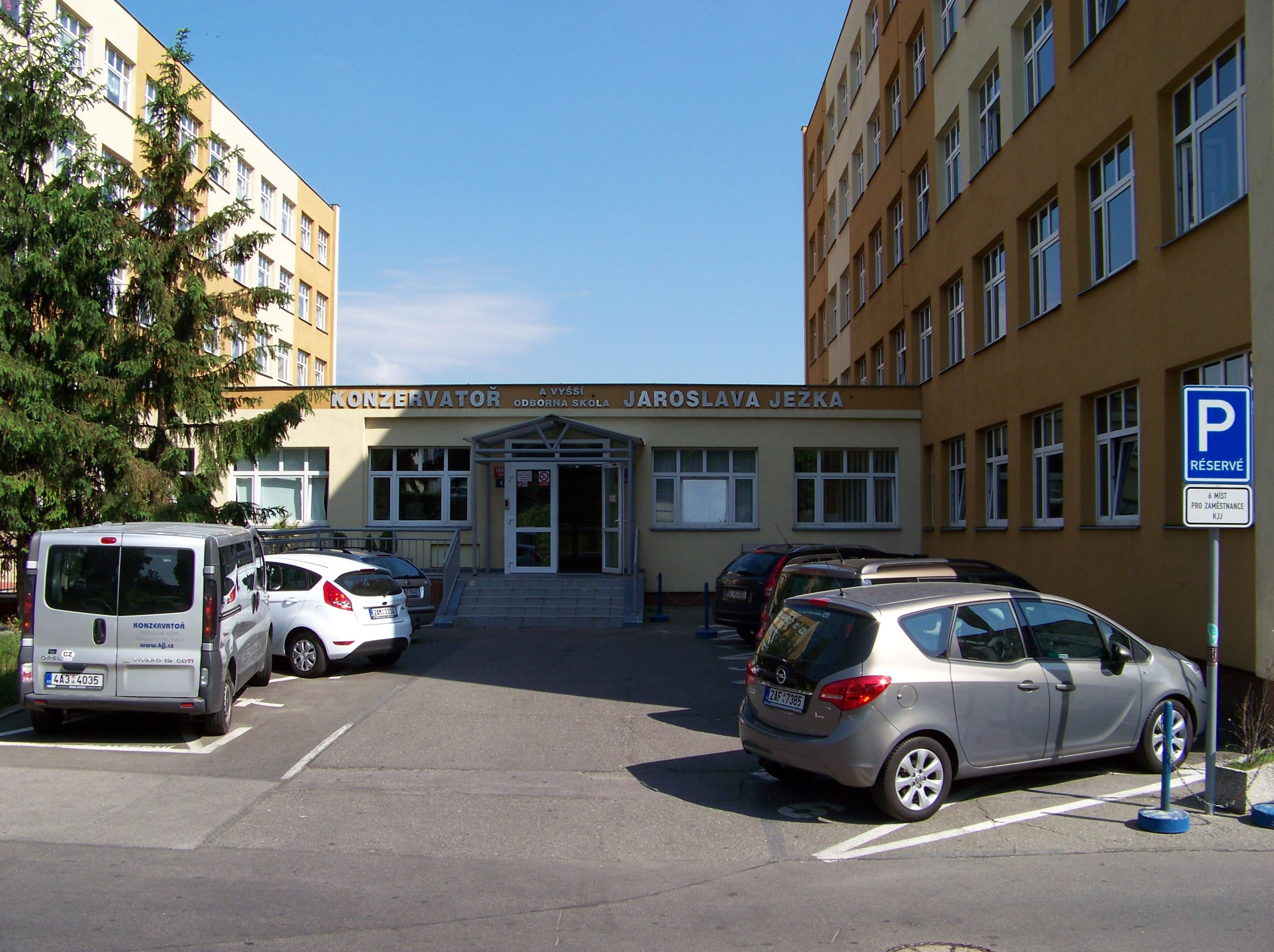

Location
- Prague; Czech Republic
- Coordinates: 50°2′26.84″N 14°25′41.039″E

Information
- Type: Music school
- Established: 1990
- Language: Czech
- Website: kjj.cz

Jaroslav Ježek Conservatory (Czech: Konzervatoř Jaroslava Ježka), located in Prague, Czech Republic, is a conservatory specializing in contemporary music. Known primarily as a school for jazz and commercial music, it also offers a six-year undergraduate diploma in Classical music, composition, conducting, scriptwriting and musical theatre. The conservatory offers instruction in piano, guitar, violin, viola, cello, bass, double bass, flute, clarinet, saxophone, trumpet, trombone, percussion instruments, accordion and voice.

== History ==
In 1958, pianist-composer-educator Vadim Petrov founded the People's Art School which offered courses for working people and was the precursor to the Jaroslav Ježek Conservatory. At the time of its founding, all music schools of the former Czechoslovakia focused primarily on Classical music, but the People's Art School offered training in jazz and commercial music for radio, theater and television. Unfortunately, the school was not able to attain the status of conservatory for ideological reasons until 1990, the year after the Velvet Revolution.

From the very beginning Jaroslav Ježek stood as an artistic and human inspiration. When the school finally managed to become a conservatory, at the end of the 1980s, the name of this impresario was accepted as the name of the school. In 1998, all the facilities of the Jaroslav Ježek Conservatory were able to be co-located in one building at Roškotova 1692/4, in the Prague 4 district.

== Selected faculty members ==
- Karel Růžička: piano
- Jaromír Honzák: double bass
- Svatopluk Košvanec: trombone
- Jaroslava Maxová: singing
- Libor Šmoldas: guitar
- Milan Svoboda: piano
- Milan Tesař: guitar
- Irina Parker: klavír
