= Héloïse Guérin =

French model (born 1989)

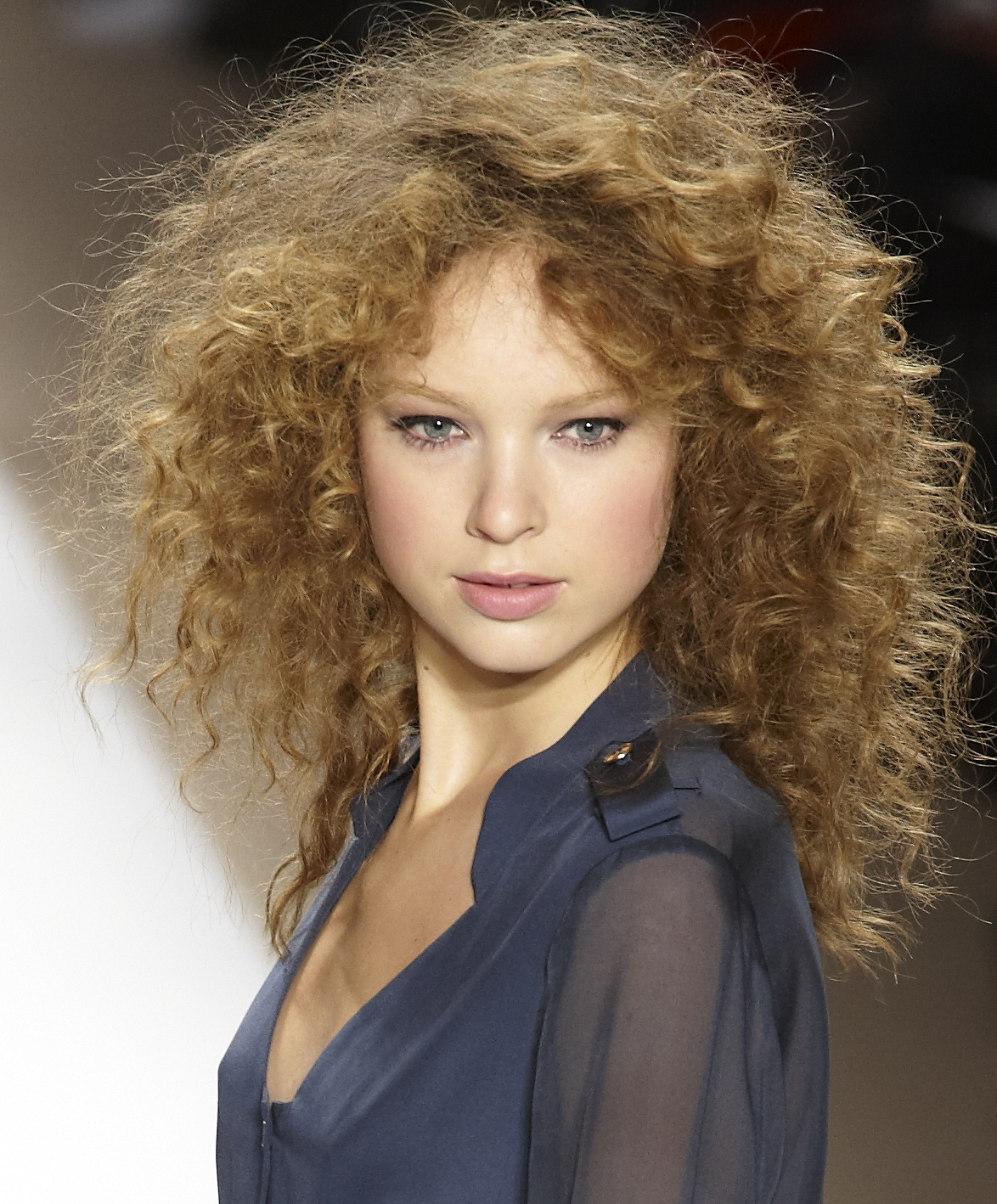
- Guérin walks for Tibi in 2010
- Born: August 26, 1989 (age 36); France
- Known for: Runway debut opening Isaac Mizrahi Fall/Winter 2008
- Relatives: Patrick Demarchelier (father-in-law)
- Modeling information
- Height: 1.80 m (5 ft 11 in)
- Hair color: Dark Blonde
- Eye color: Blue
- Agency: Women Management (New York, Milan); Elite Model Management (Paris); Select Model Management (London); Traffic Models (Barcelona); Model Management (Hamburg); MIKAs (Stockholm); Vivien's Model Management - Sydney (Sydney)

Héloïse Guérin Demarchelier (born 26 August 1989) is a French model.

== Career ==
Guérin has appeared in advertisements for Tory Burch, Clinique, J.Crew, Tommy Hilfiger, Lacoste, Lanvin, MAC Cosmetics, Saks Fifth Avenue, Victoria's Secret, Sportmax, Swarovski, Zara, and has walked the runway for Christian Dior, John Galliano, Marc Jacobs, Isaac Mizrahi, Zac Posen, Jill Stuart and others.

She has been on the cover of Allure Korea, Elle Italia, Vogue Greece. Guérin has also modelled in editorials for Vogue Australia, Elle, Glamour, and Vogue.

== Personal life ==
She is married to photographer Victor Demarchelier, son of Patrick Demarchelier. Together they have two children.
