= Vadim Petrov =

Czech music educator (1932–2020)

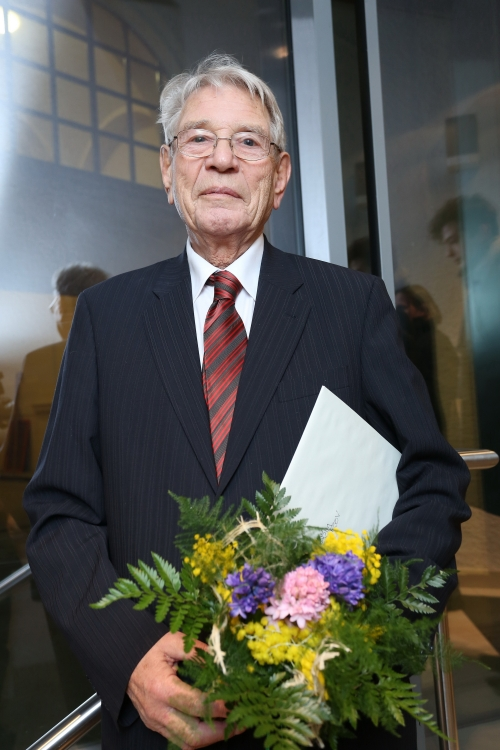
Vadim Petrov in 2012

Vadim Petrov (24 May 1932 – 7 December 2020) was a Czech composer of Russian descent.

== Biography ==
Petrov was a pianist and composer of classical and popular music. He stemmed from the family of a Russian emigrant of aristocratic origin (family Repnin), a family doctor, resident in Prague-Žižkov. At first, he attended a Russian high school in Prague district Pankrác, during which time he was preparing for his future piano and composition studies at the Music Faculty of the Academy of Performing Arts (AMU), taking piano lessons with Berta Kabeláčová and music theory and composition lessons with Miloslav Kabeláč. At the Academy he was Jaroslav Řídký's student from 1952 to 1956. His graduation composition was the symphonic poem The Vítkov Hill (Vítkov – the place of the decisive battle in 1420 near Prague). He worked in the Prague Municipal Education Centre, where he was in charge of the Folk Entertainment department. In the 1960s he founded the People's Conservatory specialising in dance-music and jazz (now Jaroslav Ježek Conservatory and College), and became its first director.

After crushing of the Prague Spring movement in 1968 his artistic work was banned. However, he managed to secure the position of professor at the Jan Deyl Conservatory and Secondary school for Visually Impaired. Later on he moved to the Prague Conservatory, where he taught music theory and composition from 1976 to 1992. He presided over the administrative board of Dilia, an international agency providing copyright protection.

An awardee of the 2003 Supraphon Gold and Platinum Disc, Petrov composed nearly 1300 works, concentrating in his production mainly on theatre, film, radio, and television music. Besides that, he was the author of traditionally conceived orchestral and chamber compositions, the so-called "easy listening", choral works, songs, popular chansons, or music for prose and poetry recitation.

His granddaughter is model Linda Vojtová.

== Filmography ==
1. Tobogan (1989)
2. Sedmé nebe (1987)
3. Úsměv diabla (1987)... a.k.a.. The Devil's Smile (International: English title)
4. Krtek, (1974–1994) ... a.k.a. The Little Mole (International: English title)
5. Osudy dobrého vojáka Švejka (1986) ... a.k.a. The Good Soldier Schweik
6. Ohnivé ženy se vracejí (1986) (TV) (supervising composer)
7. Už se nebojím (1984)
8. Šéfe, vrať se! (1984) (TV)
9. O bílém jadýrku (1983) (TV)
10. Lukáš (1982)
11. Šéfe, to je věc! (1982) (TV)
12. Trnové pole (1981)
13. Řetěz (1981)... a.k.a. The Chain
14. Útěky domů (1980)
15. Causa králík (1980)... a.k.a. Payment in Kind (UK)... a.k.a. The Rabbit Case (International: English title)
16. Modrá planeta (1977)... a.k.a. The Blue Planet
17. Krkonošské pohádky (1974) TV series (1974)... a.k.a. Fairy-tale at Krkonoše Mountains (International: English title)
