= Karel Růžička (pianist) =

Czech music educator, composer, and musician (1940–2016)

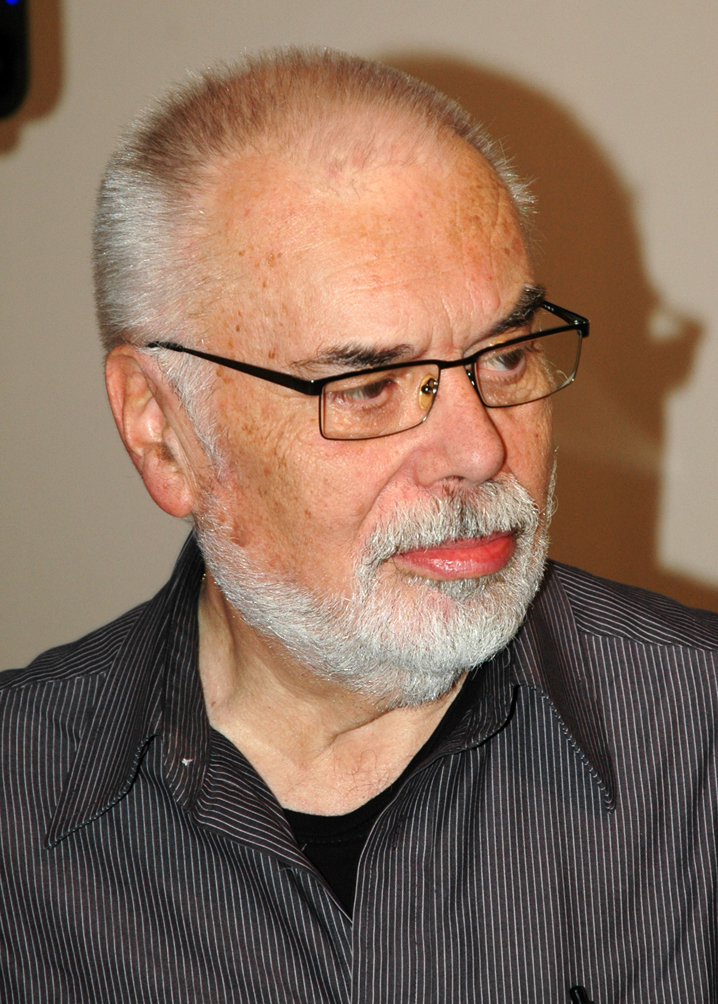
Karel Růžička in December 2012

Karel Růžička (2 June 1940 – 26 September 2016) was a Czech jazz pianist, composer and music teacher. During his career, he has collaborated with numerous notable jazz musicians, such as Karel Krautgartner, Luděk Hulan, Rudolf Dašek, George Mraz, Jiří Stivín, Laco Deczi and many others. He also worked as a teacher at the Jaroslav Ježek Conservatory and the Academy of Performing Arts in Prague. In 1993, he won the Czech Grammy award.
