= Vogue Singapore =

Singaporean fashion magazine

- Cover of October 2021 issue featuring Olivia Rodrigo
- Editor-in-chief: Desmond Lim
- Categories: Fashion
- Frequency: Monthly
- Format: Digital; Print
- Circulation: 25,000
- Publisher: Indochine Media
- Founded: September 1994
- Language: English
- Website: vogue.sg
- ISSN: 2737-4351

Vogue Singapore is the Singaporean edition of the fashion and lifestyle magazine Vogue. The magazine is published by Indochine Media. It became the 27th international edition of Vogue.

== History ==
=== 1994–1997: Condé Nast publishing ===
In March 1994, Condé Nast announced plans to launch the inaugural Asian edition of Vogue magazine in Singapore come September. The company has already established an administrative office there and intends to introduce an editorial team the following year. Until that time, Vogue Australia's Sydney office handled the editing and design tasks. Vogue Singapore was anticipated to start with a circulation of 15,000 to 18,000 copies and be sold at $3.70 per issue. About the launch, Vogue Australia's editor Nancy Pilcher said that was "probably one of the best places in the Asia Pacific to do business in," adding "[that] Besides, Singapore is like a haven of fashion. Every single label in the world is here."

The magazine officially launched in August 1994 with the September issue. The theme of the first issue was East meets West with actress Joan Chen gracing its cover. Vogue Singapore had an initial print run of 35,000 copies for distribution in Singapore, plus 10,000 for Malaysia and 1,000 each for Brunei, Indonesia, the Philippines and Thailand. It was sold at $3.30 a copy. The magazine was originally branded as Vogue Australia Singapore.

In 1996, The Wall Street Journal reported that Condé Nast Asia-Pacific would be “suspending publication of its Vogue Singapore edition because of the slowing economy in the city-state.” Then-president of Condé Nast Asia-Pacific, Didier Guerin, expressed, “The magazine was no longer economically viable in such a small market unless we compromised the quality of the magazine.” Also reporting that the magazine advertisers were withdrawing and print sales were dropping. The January 1997 was the last issue and went on sale on 30 December 1996.

=== 2020–present: Relaunch ===
In January 2020, Condé Nast announced the launch of Vogue Singapore to launch later this year with an English-language print issue, a website and presences on all relevant social platforms. It will be published under license agreement with Indochine Media Ventures, a Singapore-based media company that publishes regional editions of Robb Report and the Singapore edition of Esquire, among other titles. A print issue of Vogue Singapore will retail for around nine Singaporean Dollars. The web site will not be behind a paywall at launch, but speaking to WWD, Michael von Schlippe, president of Indochine Media, said he couldn't exclude including one down the road.

Norman Tan assumed the position of Editor-in-Chief at Vogue Singapore in April. Previously, he served as the Editor-in-Chief of Esquire Singapore for more than two years and was the founder of Buro Singapore in 2015. His extensive background in luxury publishing is a valuable addition to his new role. Tan holds a double degree in commerce and law from the University of Melbourne.

The magazine officially launched in September 2020 with three different covers. Singaporean model Diya Prabhakar features on the main cover, while Chinese model Ju Xiaowen and Japanese actress Nana Komatsu round out the triptych. Both print and digital versions of the publication feature scannable QR codes, as well as AR and VR content.

== Editors ==
Circulation	Editor-in-chief	Start year	End year
1994–1997	Nancy Pilcher	1994	1995
1994–1997	Michal McKay	1996	1997
2020–present	Norman Tan	2020	2022
2020–present	Desmond Lim	2023	present

== See also ==
- List of Vogue Singapore cover models
