= List of Vogue Singapore cover models =

This list of Vogue Singapore cover models is a catalog of cover models who have appeared on the cover of Vogue Singapore, the Singaporean edition of Vogue magazine, from September 1994 to January 1997 with the first version and since September 2020 with the relaunched version.

== 1990s ==
=== 1994 ===
Issue	Cover model	Photographer
September	Joan Chen	Russel Wong
October	Jenny Shimizu	
November	Celia Teh	Russel Wong
December	Rojjana Phetkanha	

=== 1995 ===
Issue	Cover model	Photographer
January	Chantel Goh	Adrian Wong
February	Chyna Wu	
March	Navia Nguyen	
April	Jasmine Taylor	Russel Wong
May	Karen Chai	
June	Celest Chong	
July	Valerie Celis	
August	Gong Li	
September	Irina Pantaeva	Patric Shaw
October	Chyna Wu	
November	Daniela Pestová	
December	Lala Flores	

=== 1996 ===
Issue	Cover model	Photographer
January	Lorraine Pascale	
February		
March	QiQi, Simon Yam	Gino Zardo
April	Ling Tan	Tom Munro
May	Vanessa Yeung	Hank Warner
June	Ayako Kawahara	Pascal Chevallier
July	Brandi Quinones	
August	Valerie Celis	Tony Amos
September	Natane Boudreau	Tom Munro
October	Natane Boudreau	Tom Munro
November	Jessie Leong	Chuan Do
December	Kimmy Chin, Crissy Chin	

=== 1997 ===
Issue	Cover model	Photographer
January	Naomi Campbell	Huggy Ragnarsson

== 2020s ==
=== 2020 ===
Issue	Cover model	Photographer
Autumn/Winter	Nana Komatsu	Fish Zhang
Autumn/Winter	Diya Prabhakar	Bryan Huynh
Autumn/Winter	Xiao Wen Ju	Gregory Harris
December/January	He Cong & Malika Louback	Nathaniel Goldberg

=== 2021 ===
Issue	Cover model	Photographer
February	Yasmin Wijnaldum	Roe Ethridge
March	Liu Wen	Leslie Zhang
April	Yuna	Chee Wei
May/June	Awkwafina	Yelena Yemchuk
July/August	Selena Gomez	Alique
September	—N/a	—N/a
October	Olivia Rodrigo	Peter Ash Lee
October	Aespa	Jang Dukhwa
November/December	Gemma Chan	Liz Collins

=== 2022 ===
Issue	Cover model	Photographer
January/February	BTS	Hyea W. Kang
January/February	Fan Bingbing	Leslie Zhang
March	Kaigin Yong; Sheila Sim; Tara Ayathan; Lucas Jong; Rosalina Oktavia; Alyssha Hannah	Zantz Han
March	Nandita Banna; Jane Chong; Serena Adsit; Fahimah Thalib; Natalie Dykes; Fann Wong	Zantz Han
March	Noelle Woon; Srri Ramm; Huda Ali Gan; Fiona Fussi; Luth Seah	Zantz Han
March	Aimee Cheng-Bradshaw; Zoe Tay; Diya Prabhakar; Yasmin Ee; Maya Menon	Zantz Han
April	Doja Cat	Sharif Hamza
May/June	Lu Xia	Zhang Ahuei
July/August	Cardi B	Lea Colombo
September	Lina Zhang	Zantz Han
October	CL; Jackson Wang	Go Wontae; Thomas Giddings
November/December	Rina Sawayama	Jenny Brough

=== 2023 ===
Issue	Cover model	Photographer
January/February	Suzi de Givenchy	Andrea Urbez
March	AI avatars	Daryl Tan & AI artist Varun Gupta
April	Niki	Charlotte Rutherford
May/June	Taeyang	Mok Jungwook
July/August	Jennie	Hong Jang Hyun
September	Shin Hyun-ji	Philippe Jarrigeon
October	Rizal Rama, Vanizha Vasanthanathan	Zantz Han
November	Kiko Mizuhara	Petra Collins
December	Raelynn Bumgardner	Adam Franzino

=== 2024 ===
Issue	Cover model	Photographer
January/February	Deepika Padukone	James Tolich
March	Hakken	Zantz Han
April	Charli XCX	Nick Knight
May	Sara Grace Wallerstedt	Txema Yeste
June	Xiao Wen Ju	Leslie Zhang
July/August	Olivia Dean	Petros
September	Sasha Pivovarova	Domen & Van De Velde
October	Huỳnh Tú Anh; Aslesha Williams; Suganya; Clarita Yong	Nelson Chong
November	Lucy Liu	Victor Demarchelier
November	Jin	Jungwook Mok
December	Ashley Park	Benjamin Lennox

=== 2025 ===
Issue	Cover model	Photographer
January/February	Stephanie Hsu	Alvin Kean Wong
March	Jean Somi	Kim Hee June
April	Bibi	Mok Jungwook
May	Neelam Gill	Javier Castán
June	Gemma Chan	Peter Ash Lee
July/August	Zoe Tay	Zantz Han
July/August	Tasha Low	Zantz Han
September	Lara Stone	Camilla Akrans
October	Kaigin Yong, Ryan Alexander, Zach Daniels, Arun Rosiah, Laras Sekar	Zantz Han
November	Tilda Swinton	Sølve Sundsbø
December	Audrey Nuna	Domen & Van De Velde

=== 2026 ===
Issue	Cover model	Photographer
January/February	Yerin Ha	Peter Ash Lee
March	Devon Ross	Dana Trippe
April	Becky Armstrong	Zantz Han
April	Cailee Spaeny	Norman Jean Roy
May	Bebe Parnell	Jumbo Tsui
June	Zara Larsson	Benjamin Vnuk
June	Joshua	Jang Duk Hwa
July/August	Tanya Chua	Chuo Mo
July/August	Ayden Sng	Zantz Han
September	Sarah Pidgeon	Dan Beleiu
October	Yun Seo Woo	Bakya A Bedla
November	Tao Okamoto	Bungo Tsuchiya
