= Laguna College of Business and Arts =

Private college in Calamba, Laguana, Philippines

- Former name: Laguna Institute
- Motto: Sitim Sedate Ex
- Motto in English: "Quench Your Thirst"
- Type: Private, Private Non-Sectarian
- Established: June 1930
- Founder: Don Pedro Evangelista Llamas
- Academic affiliations: PACUCOA
- President: Jose Ted Llamas Gonzales
- Location: Burgos St. Calamba, Laguna, Philippines; 14°12′38″N 121°09′44″E
- Campus: Urban, 300,000 m^{2} (3,200,000 sq ft)
- Hymn: "Oh Loyal Sons"
- Colors: Blue and white
- Nickname: LCBA
- Mascot: Lycans
- Website: www.lcba.edu.ph
- Location in Laguna Location in Luzon Location in the Philippines

Laguna College of Business and Arts (LCBA), formerly known as the Laguna Institute, is a private, non-sectarian institution located in Calamba, Laguna, Philippines.

Established in June 1930, LCBA holds the distinction of being the first secondary school in Calamba, a historic city in the province of Laguna, located about 50 kilometers south of Metro Manila.

== History ==
=== Founder ===
Pedro Evangelista Llamas or Don Pedro E. Llamas (1884–1946) was a pioneering educator and public servant from Pagsanjan, Laguna. Born on August 1, 1884, to Gabriel Llamas and Eleutera Evangelista, he pursued his education internationally, attending St. Joseph Catholic School in Hong Kong and earning a Bachelor of Science in Pharmaceutical Chemistry from the University of Michigan. In 1912, he married Josefa Gomez Francia, with whom he had nine children namely Herminio, Guadalupe, Fidel, Amor, Luis, Jose, Mario, Carlos and Eva.

In 1916, Llamas was elected Municipal President of Pagsanjan, serving until 1920. Although widely supported by his constituents, he declined re-election due to health concerns. He founded Pagsanjan Academy in 1923 to address the lack of local secondary schools. Recognizing the growing need for further educational opportunities, he also noted that children from Pagsanjan had to travel to neighboring towns such as Sta. Cruz, Los Baños, or even Manila for secondary education, while Calamba lacked such institutions. In response to this gap, Llamas established the Laguna Institute in 1930, further expanding educational access for the youth of Calamba and surrounding areas. Pagsanjan Academy later came under the co-management of the Laguna College of Business and Arts administration.

Despite challenges, including the disruptions of World War II, his schools persevered, with Laguna Institute reopening in 1950 after a brief closure. Llamas died on January 13, 1946, at the age of 61 due to heart failure. His legacy as a champion of education continues to impact his community, inspiring future generations in Laguna.

=== Laguna Institute (L.I.) ===
The Laguna Institute formally opened in June 1930, initially enrolling 95 students in its first and second-year high school levels. The original campus was housed in a rented, two-story green and white building located on a 500-square-meter (5,400 sq ft) lot along Burgos Street, which at the time was still unpaved. By 1933, the school was officially recognized by the Department of Public Institutions as an accredited high school.

Operations were suspended during World War II and remained closed until 1945. In 1950, Laguna Institute expanded its offerings by inaugurating both elementary and college departments. The tertiary programs initially included Associate in Commercial Science, Elementary Teacher's Certificate, and Associate in Arts. Over time, additional degree programs were introduced, including Bachelor of Secondary Education, Bachelor of Elementary Education, Bachelor of Science in Commerce, Bachelor of Arts, and Junior Secretarial Courses.

In 1995, the institute further diversified its academic offerings by launching programs in Bachelor of Science in Secretarial Administration, Bachelor of Science in Computer Engineering, and Bachelor of Science in Computer Science.

=== Laguna College of Business and Arts (LCBA) ===
==== College Programs and TESDA Programs ====
Laguna College of Business and Arts (LCBA) provides college degree programs such as Bachelor of Science in Hotel and Restaurant Management, Bachelor of Elementary Education with a major in Preschool Education, Bachelor of Secondary Education with majors in Physical Science, Biological Science, and Technology and Livelihood Education (TLE), Bachelor of Science in Psychology and more.

In addition, LCBA offers a variety of TESDA courses, including Computer Programming NC IV, Housekeeping, Food and Beverage, Commercial Cooking, and Bartending and partners with schools within Calamba through Joint Development Voucher Program (JDVP) for Senior High School students.

==== Elementary Department Reopening ====
After its closure in 1953, the elementary department of LCBA was reopened in 1989. Prior to this, the school reintroduced pre-elementary education in 1987, offering Nursery, Kindergarten, and Preparatory levels, thus revitalizing early education within the institution.

==== School of Graduate Studies ====
LCBA's graduate school was established in the 1977–1978 academic year, initially offering a Master of Arts in Teaching. Over time, the programs expanded to include:

- Master in Management (MM)
- Master in Business Administration (MBA)
- Master of Arts in Education (MAEd)
- Master of Science in Psychology (MSP)

==== Senior High School Department ====
In 2016, LCBA launched its Senior High School Department, introducing academic strands tailored to the needs of Grade 11 and 12 students in Calamba City and Laguna. These strands include:

- Science, Technology, Engineering, and Mathematics (STEM)
- Accountancy, Business, and Management (ABM)
- Humanities and Social Sciences (HUMSS)
- General Academic Strand (GAS)
- Technical-Vocational-Livelihood Strand (TVL)
  - Information and Communications Technology (ICT)
  - Home Economics (HE)

=== Name Change ===
The institution was originally known as Laguna Institute before officially adopting the name Laguna College of Business and Arts (LCBA) in its 50th anniversary in 1980.

Despite its official name change to Laguna College of Business and Arts (LCBA) in 1980, locals—particularly jeepney drivers and tricycle drivers—continue to refer to the school by its original name, Laguna Institute.

=== Community Extension ===
The Community Extension Office of Laguna College of Business and Arts (LCBA) serves as the institution’s social responsibility arm, fostering community engagement and development initiatives. Currently, LCBA is partnered with Barangay Kay-Anlog, Calamba, to provide support and assistance in various community programs. Through this collaboration, the institution extends its resources and expertise to address local needs, reinforcing its commitment to social development and civic responsibility.

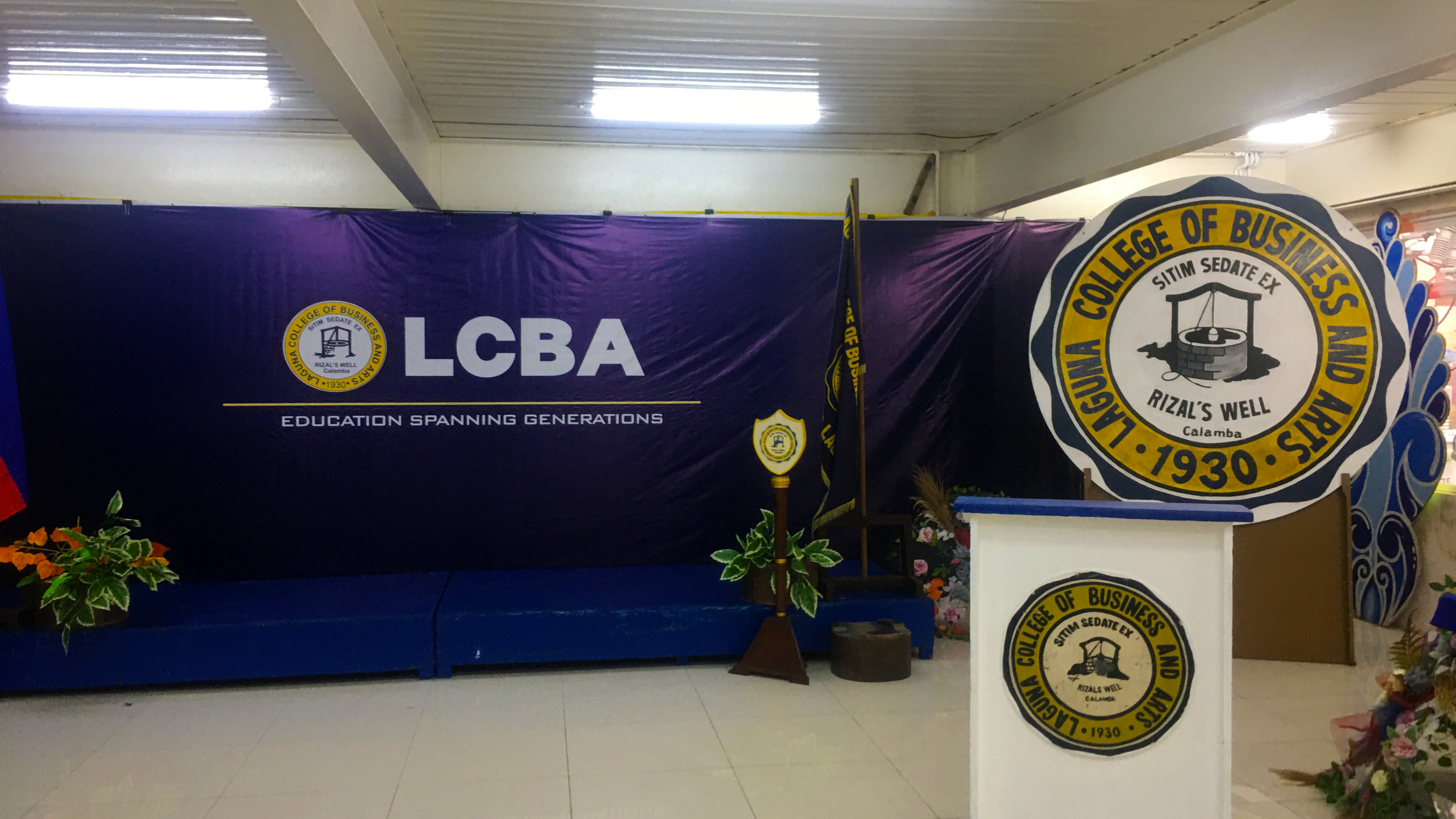
LCBA Multi-purpose Hall (stage area)

== Accreditation ==
In 2013, the institution began its application for accreditation with the Philippine Association of Colleges and Universities Commission on Accreditation (PACUCOA). Following a successful evaluation, it was granted Level 1 Formal Accredited Status for its Business Administration, Bachelor of Science in Psychology, High School, and Elementary programs on February 3, 2016, as endorsed by the Federation of Accrediting Agencies of the Philippines (FAAP).

The institution was also granted Candidate Status for its Master in Business Administration, Master in Management (major in Public Administration), and Bachelor of Elementary Education programs in 2017. Other academic programs are currently undergoing the accreditation process. The institution’s Graduate School and all college programs are officially recognized by the Commission on Higher Education (CHED), while its Basic Education programs have received recognition from the Department of Education (DepEd), the Private Education Assistance Committee (PEAC), and the Technical Education and Skills Development Authority (TESDA).

== Campus ==
The Laguna College of Business and Arts (LCBA) campus is situated in the heart of Calamba, Laguna, within the thriving CALABARZON growth region. Spanning 300,000 square meters (3,200,000 sq ft), the campus features fully air-conditioned classrooms across all educational levels, each designed to accommodate 40 to 50 students.

The campus offers a range of facilities designed to support academic, extracurricular, and sports activities. These include a multi-purpose quadrangle, audio-visual rooms, a speech laboratory, cyber hubs, and Information Resource Centers (IRC) catering to Graduate Studies, College, High School, and Elementary levels. Additionally, the campus features a multi-purpose hall, a gymnasium, a science and engineering laboratory, and a parking lot. To enhance the learning experience, all classrooms are equipped with air-conditioning and television displays for lesson projection.

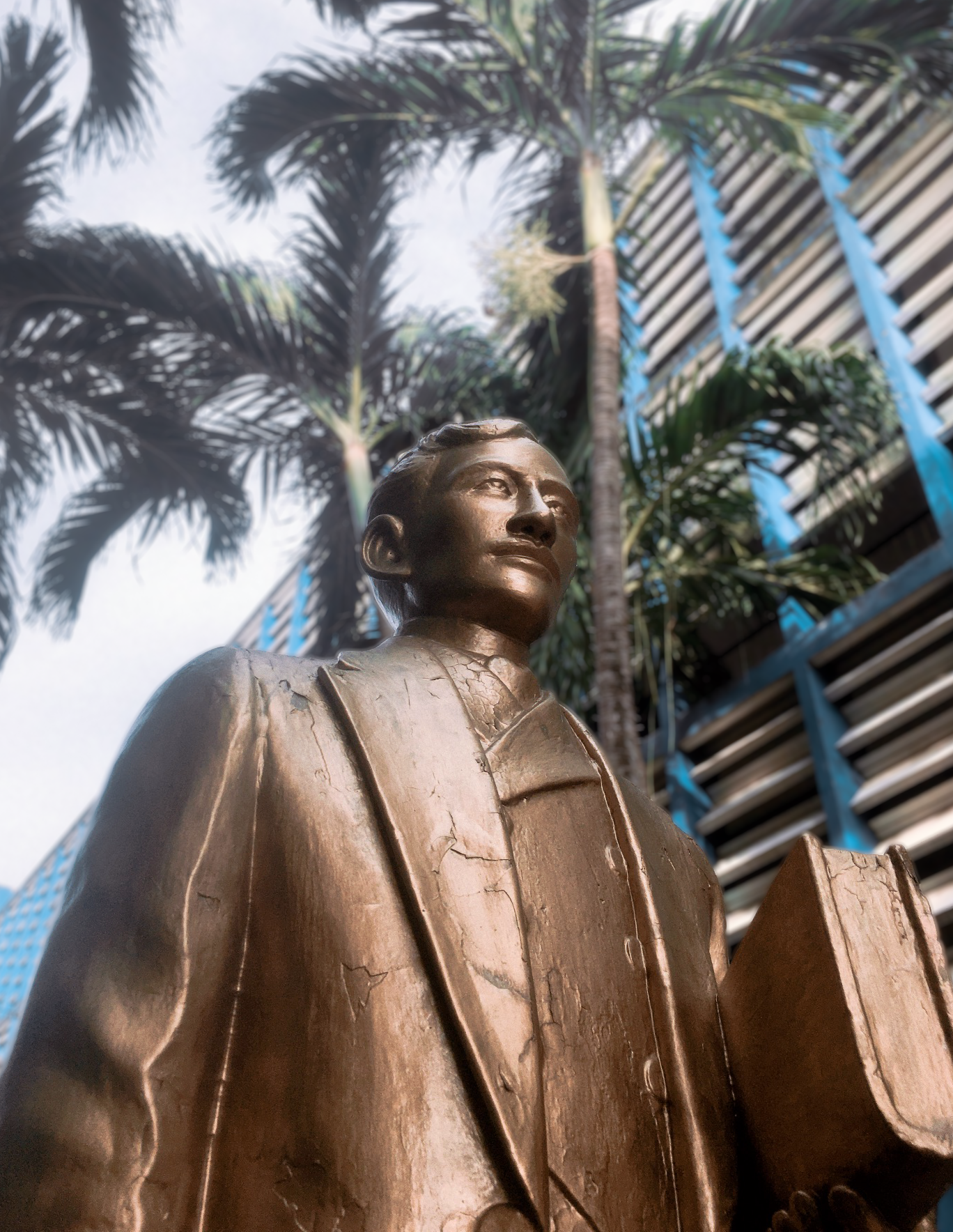
A statue of Dr. José Rizal stands in front of the façade of the original LCBA building.

The original LCBA building, remains a significant structure on campus. It accommodates High School and Graduate Studies students and houses key offices such as the Guidance and Testing Center and the Admissions Office. At the center of the building lies the LCBA Garden and Chapel, featuring statues of José Rizal, the Well of Knowledge, and a half-bust of the school’s founder, Don Pedro Llamas.

On January 3, 2025, in celebration of its 95th anniversary, Laguna College of Business and Arts (LCBA) held a groundbreaking ceremony for its newly acquired property located across Pabalan Street, adjacent to the main campus. The development of the newly acquired property is intended to alleviate congestion in the main campus quadrangle. The site may include construction of a parking lot, a new building with classrooms, and a covered basketball court.

== Programs ==
=== School of Graduate Studies ===
- Master in Management - Major in Public Administration (MPA)
- Master in Business Administration (MBA)
- Master of Science in Psychology (MSP)
- Master of Arts in Education Major in Administration and Supervision (MAEd) Majors: Administration and Supervision, English, Filipino, Social Studies, Guidance and Counselling

=== School of College Studies ===
- Department of Engineering and Computer Studies (DECS)
  - Bachelor of Science in Computer Engineering (BS CpE)
  - Bachelor of Science in Computer Science (BS CS)
- Department of Accountancy (DOA)
  - Bachelor of Science in Accountancy (BSA)
- Department of Business (DOB)
  - Bachelor of Science in Business Administration (BS BA) Majors: Human Resources Development Management (BSBA-HRDM) and Marketing Management (BSBA-MM)
  - Bachelor of Science in Entrepreneurship in Culinary Arts (BS ENTREP)
- Department of Teacher Education (DTE)
  - Bachelor of Science in Secondary Education (BSEd) Majors: English, Mathematics, Filipino, and Social Studies
  - Bachelor of Science in Elementary Education (BEEd)
- Department of Arts and Sciences (DAS)
  - Bachelor of Science in Psychology (BS PSYCH)
  - Bachelor of Arts in Political Science (AB POLSCI)

=== Basic Education Department ===
- Senior High School – Grades 11 to 12
  - Strand/Tracks: ABM, STEM, HUMSS, GAS, TVL
- Junior High School – Grade 7 to 10
- Elementary – Grade 1 to 6
- Pre-school

=== TESDA Technical Courses ===
- Programming NC IV
- Commercial Cooking NC II
- Housekeeping NC II
- Food and Beverages Services
- Bartending NC II

== Administration & Faculty ==
The Laguna College of Business and Arts (LCBA) is led by a dedicated administrative team committed to ensuring the institution's academic excellence and growth. The current administration includes: (Latest as of January 2026)

Executive

- Jose Ted Llamas Gonzales – President
- Geraldine Gonzales – Chief Operations Officer

Academic

- Dr. Ma. Lorena Tagala – Academe Director
- Dr. Eula Javier – Principal of Basic Education Department
- Dr. Melchor Villapando – Dean of the School of College Studies & Program Chair of the Department of Teacher Education
- Alfredo Perez Jr. – Research Director and Dean of the School of Graduate Studies
- Bernard Christopher Catam – Head of Guidance and Testing Center
- Peter Marc Albaira – Coordinator of Office of Student Affairs and Services
- Allen Llorca – Head of Student Management and Inventory System

== Notable alumni ==
Among its graduates are two National Scientists of the Philippines, recognized for their pioneering research in biochemical genetics, cytogenetics, and biochemistry.

- Dolores A. Ramirez Ph.D. – National Scientist of the Philippines for Biochemical Genetics & Cytogenetics
  - High School Graduate, Batch 1956 (First Honorable Mention)
- Bienvenido O. Juliano Ph.D. – National Scientist of the Philippines for Biochemistry
- Jose Juliano Ph.D. – Filipino physicist and chemist
- Atty. Rommel Gecolea – Attorney, Gecolea and Lomoya Law and former Mayor, City of Cabuyao
  - College Graduate, Batch 1989 (AB Political Science, Magna Cum Laude)
- Ramil L. Hernandez – Former Governor, now 2nd District Representative, Province of Laguna
  - High School Graduate, Batch 1989
- Roseller "Ross" Rizal – Mayor, City of Calamba
  - High School Graduate, Batch 1982
  - College Graduate, Batch 1986 (Bachelor of Science in Commerce Major in Accountancy, now known as BS Accountancy)
- Euginie "Gino" Z. Salom – Founder & Chairman, Tahanan ni Gino Foundation
  - Elementary Graduate, Batch 2000
  - High School Graduate, Batch 2004
  - College Graduate, Batch 2008 (BS Computer Science)
