= Russel Wong =

Singaporean photographer

Russel Wong (Chinese: 黄国基; pinyin: Huáng Guójī) is a Singapore-born Hollywood celebrity photographer.

== Education and early years ==
He received his primary and secondary education at Anglo-Chinese School, and his bachelor's degree at University of Oregon, Eugene. Renowned for his portraits of celebrities like Jackie Chan, Richard Gere and Tom Cruise, Wong has been called the "Richard Avedon of Asia".

Wong first came to prominence in 1980, when, at 19, his photograph of track-and-field athlete Sebastian Coe was chosen for the cover of Track & Field News. Wong continued covering sports events, and this early work was "characterised by a kind of spontaneous, adrenaline-charged quality".

In 1984, Wong enrolled at the Art Center College of Design in Los Angeles for a fine art degree in Photography, where he encountered the fashion designer and photographer Paul Jasmin and Antonio Lopez, the fashion illustrator. Wong made his first foray into fashion photography on a four-month trip to Milan, Italy, and Jasmin and Lopez were formative in supporting his career, introducing him to photographers like Art Kane.

== Career ==
In the late 1980s, Wong returned to Singapore to establish his photographic studio, Russel Wong Photography. Clients like TIME, New York Times and Los Angeles Times began calling upon him for his signature style, "a distinctive branding and artistic interpretation of the elusive ‘Asian identity’." Notably, Wong has shot 16 covers for TIME.

Beginning in 2000, Wong shot the publicity images for Ang Lee's Crouching Tiger, Hidden Dragon (2000), Zhang Yimou's Hero (2002), House of Flying Daggers (2004) and Ang Lee's award winning " Lust, Caution " (2007).

In 2005, a collection of his photographs titled Russel Wong: Photographs 1980 - 2005 was published by Epigram Books. This book was published in conjunction with Wong's solo exhibition at the Singapore Art Museum, the first for a Singaporean photographer. In the same year, Wong became the first and only photographer to be invited for the art residency at the Singapore Tyler Print Institute. His art works can be found in public and private collections, with his “Bamboo Forest” print going for a record US$40,000 at a recent Christie’s auction in Hong Kong.

In 2009, Wong staged Russel Wong: A Different Journey at Valentine Willie Fine Art, Singapore, presenting his landscape and nature photography. In 2011, Wong staged his first exhibition in Australia. In 2012, Wong staged his first American exhibition, Russel Wong: The Big Picture at Eugene, Oregon's Jordan Schnitzer Museum of Art.

Wong played himself in a cameo in the 2018 film Crazy Rich Asians.

== Personal life ==
Wong is an avid jazz lover. He also is a food lover and has his blog www.thewongist.com He has also appeared in good friend Anthony Bourdain's 'No Reservations' and 'The Layover ' shows on TV.

== Works ==
- The Art of Flying: Singapore Through the Lens of Russel Wong (Civil Aviation Authority of Singapore, 2010, 2013) ISBN 9789810851897 ISBN 9789810758288
- Russel Wong: Photographs 1980 - 2005 (Epigram Books, 2005) ISBN 9810526822
- Singapore Symphony (Landmark Books, 1994) ISBN 9813002832
