= América González =

Venezuelan fashion model

- Born: 27 April 1995 (age 31); Caracas, Venezuela
- Education: Central University of Venezuela
- Modeling information
- Hair color: Brown
- Eye color: Dark Brown
- Agency: Supreme Management (New York, Paris); Why Not Model Management (Milan); Wilhelmina Models (London); Modelwerk (Hamburg); Bravo Models (Tokyo)

América González is a Venezuelan fashion model.

== Career ==
As a medical student at the Central University of Venezuela, González was convinced by her sister to participate in a local casting. Although shy in front of the cameras, there she met the stylist Tata Hellmund. An agent from Spain who was visiting Venezuela decided to take her to Europe because of her potential. She debuted in Milan walking for Angel Chen and walked for Dries van Noten in her first season. She was scheduled to go to a casting for Dior but missed it due to a train delay, although she was ultimately able to walk for the brand appearing in its A/W 2022 show. She walked 30 shows that season including for Louis Vuitton, Michael Kors, The Row, and Fendi.

Vogue chose her as one of the 10 breakout models of the S/S 2022 runway season. In addition to editorials for Vogue, and its international editions she has appeared in i-D, and on the cover of Vogue Mexico.
