= Soo Joo Park =

Korean American model (born 1986)

- 박수주
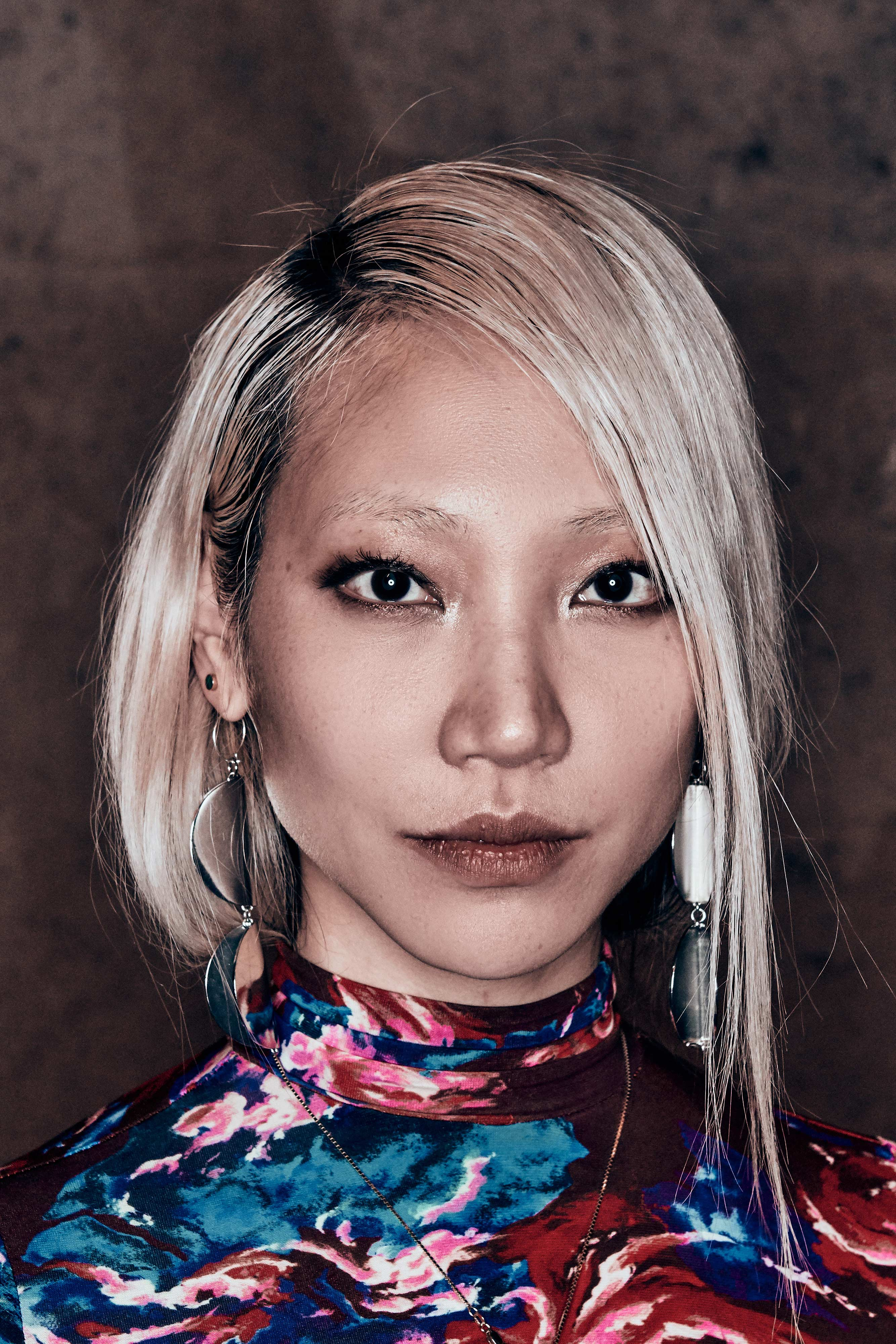
- Park in 2019
- Born: March 26, 1986 (age 40); Seoul, South Korea
- Education: University of California, Berkeley
- Modeling information
- Height: 5 ft 10 in (1.78 m)
- Hair color: Platinum blonde (dyed); Black (natural)
- Eye color: Brown
- Agency: Women Management (New York); IMG Models (Paris, Sydney, Milan); Storm Management (London); Nomad Management (Miami Beach, Los Angeles); ESteem

Soo Joo Park (born Park Suju; March 26, 1986) is an American fashion model and musician. She became the first Asian-American woman to be a L'Oréal spokesmodel. She is also known for her work with Chanel and is a Global Ambassador for the brand.

== Early life ==
Park was born in Seoul, South Korea and moved to Anaheim, California when she was ten years old. She graduated from the University of California, Berkeley with an Architecture degree. After graduation, she moved to San Francisco, where she got scouted while shopping at a vintage store in the Haight-Ashbury neighborhood.

== Career ==
Park's first fashion credit was appearing in a BCBG Max Azria advertisement in 2010. After moving to New York, she dyed her hair from natural black to platinum blonde. Soon after, she was quickly noticed by major brands including Chanel and Tom Ford and walked in their shows. In her debut fashion week seasons she walked for Chanel, Vivienne Westwood, Emporio Armani, Fendi, Rick Owens, Lanvin, and LOEWE among others.

She appeared in Vogue Italia, Glamour, and Dazed editorials in 2012. She has also appeared in W, i-D, CR Fashion Book, Vogue, Paper, and Teen Vogue among others.

In 2014, Park was featured on Models.com’s “Top 50 Models” list and in 2015, she joined “The Money Girls” list.

In advertisements, Park has been the face of campaigns for Michael Kors, MAC Cosmetics, Tom Ford, Redken, Gap Inc., DKNY, and Bvlgari.

In May 2015, Park opened the Chanel 2015/16 Cruise show presented at the Dongdaemun Design Plaza in Seoul, chosen by Karl Lagerfeld as the Chanel muse representing Asia.

In 2017, she played Sutra on the second season of the Netflix drama series Sense8.

In 2020, she was one of the 100 cover stars for Vogue Italia's September Issue.

In June 2021, Park made her musical debut under the name Ether, with a cover of a classic Korean rock song, "Haenim," which was written and produced in 1968 by Joong-Hyun Shin. Prior to that, she had been working on music and DJing for several years. In December, she performed "Haenim" live at the Chanel Métiers d’Art 2021/2022 show.

In 2022, Park was selected as an "Industry Icon" by Models.com In September, Chanel announced her as the face of the Première Original Edition watch.

== Filmography ==
Web series
Year	Title	Role	Notes
2017-2018	Sense8	Sutra	2 episodes
2024	The Trainer		

Music video work
Year	Title	Artist	Role
2021	"Zeros"	Desire	
2021	"Haenim"	Desire ft. Ether	
2025	"Gabriela"	Katseye	Spill That Tea Host
2026	"Hooligan"	BTS	
