= Dimitris Nikolaidis (water polo) =

Greek water polo player (born 1999)

Dimitrios Nikolaidis
Personal information
- Nationality: Greek
- Born: 10 June 1999 (age 27) Thessaloniki
- Height: 193 cm (76 in)
- Weight: 88 kg (194 lb)

Sport
- Sport: Water polo
- Position: Center Forward
- Current club: Olympiacos
Medal record
European Championship
Bronze medal – third place	2026 Belgrade

Dimitrios Nikolaidis (born 10 June 1999) is a Greek water polo player. He represented Greece at the 2024 Summer Olympics.
