= Sharina Gutierrez =

American model (born 1990)

- Born: Sharina Cantre Gutierrez; July 14, 1990 (age 36); Los Angeles, California, U.S.
- Children: 2
- Modeling information
- Height: 1.78 m (5 ft 10 in)
- Hair color: Black
- Eye color: Brown
- Agency: Elite Model Management (New York)

Sharina Cantre Gutierrez is an American model.

== Early life and career ==
Gutierrez was born in Los Angeles to Filipino parents. She was raised in Riverside, California. At 13, she was discovered at a modeling competition in New York City, and her first job was for Vogue Italia. Gutierrez has also appeared in Teen Vogue, Glamour, Elle, and (the now-defunct) Lucky. Gutierrez has modeled for brands such as United Colors of Benetton, Levi’s, Rimmel London, Band of Outsiders, 3.1 Phillip Lim, Polo Ralph Lauren, and Tommy Hilfiger. She appeared in a Reebok campaign alongside Ariana Grande, Gigi Hadid, Rae Sremmurd, Teyana Taylor and Lil Yachty.

She has appeared in music videos for Chris Brown and Tyga.

== Personal life ==
Gutierrez has a son and a daughter. As of 2024, she resides in Riverside, California.
