= Dolores Ramirez =

Filipino geneticist

Dolores A. Ramirez ONS
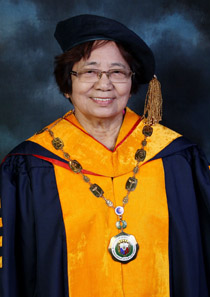
- Official portrait, National Academy of Science and Technology
- Born: September 20, 1931 (age 94); Calamba, Laguna
- Education: University of the Philippines Los Baños; University of Minnesota; Purdue University; Laguna College of Business and Arts
- Awards: Order of National Scientists of the Philippines (1998)
- Scientific career
- Fields: Cytogenetics
- Workplaces: University of the Philippines Los Baños

Dean of the UPLB Graduate School
- In office 1979–1989
- Preceded by: Faustino T. Orillo
- Succeeded by: Noel G. Mamicpic

Dolores Altoveros Ramirez (born September 20, 1931) is a Filipino geneticist. She specializes in plant breeding and plant cytogenetics. She was named a National Scientist of the Philippines in 1998.

== Early life and education ==
Dolores A. Ramirez was born on September 20, 1931, in Calamba, Laguna, to Leonor Altoveros and Augusto U. Ramirez. She was the oldest of eight children and her father died when she was young. She graduated from Laguna Institute (now Laguna College of Business and Arts) in 1952 with a First Honorable Mention award.

She attended the University of the Philippines Los Baños, earning a bachelor of science in agriculture, magna cum laude, in 1956. Her thesis, under Dioscoro L. Umali, concerned the nature of lodging in rice. She received a Rockefeller Foundation scholarship and attended the University of Minnesota in the United States. She studied under cytogeneticist Charles Burnham and earned her MSc in cytogenetics in 1958. She continued on to Purdue University, studying under geneticist Mark L. Tomes. She received her PhD in biochemical genetics in 1963, minoring in plant pathology and plant physiology.

== Career ==
After Ramirez completed her PhD, she returned to the University of the Philippines where she conducted research into the breeding and cytogenetics of plants. She was hired by the College of Agriculture of the University of the Philippines Los Baños as an assistant professor in 1964. She attained the position of associate professor in 1969 and full professor in 1974. She was named a full University Professor in 1995.

Much of Ramirez's research has been into plants important to agriculture in the Philippines. She researched the genetic basis of chemical resistance factors of Cercospora, which causes the formation of leaf spots in mung beans. She also studied the cytogenetics of hybrids of rice, tracing the cause of sterility from crosses with wild strains. Her plant research led to improved varieties of fruit, sugarcane, rice, coconut, and ornamentals. She conducted research with Evelyn Mae Tecson-Mendoza on how macapuno coconut genes that characterize endosperm cell walls are affected by high galactomannan metabolism.

Ramirez served as an associate editor of the Philippine Journal of Crop Science and the Philippine Phytopathological Journal. She was the editor-in-chief of The Philippine Agriculturist for 10 years. She served on the Board of Trustees of the International Maize and Wheat Improvement Center and held the Professorial Chair for Genetics of the Southeast Asian Regional Center for Graduate Study and Research in Agriculture (SEARCA) from 1974 to 1976.

In August 2023, she was featured on the cover of Vogue Philippines.

== Awards and honors ==
- National Scientist of the Philippines (1998)
- A hybrid of Hibiscus rosa-sinensis was named for her in 2000, Hibiscus rosa-sinensis 'Dolores A. Ramirez'.

== Selected publications ==
- Ranjhan, S.; Glaszmann, J. C.; Ramirez, D. A.; Khush, G. S. (April 1988). "Chromosomal localization of four isozyme loci by trisomic analysis in rice (Oryza sativa L.)". Theoretical and Applied Genetics. 75 (4): 541–545. doi:10.1007/BF00289118. S2CID 777808.
- Mujer, Cesar V.; Ramirez, Dolores A.; Mendoza, Evelyn Mae T. (April 1984). "α-d-galactosidase deficiency in coconut endosperm: its possible pleiotropic effects in makapuno". Phytochemistry. 23 (4): 893–894. Bibcode:1984PChem..23..893M. doi:10.1016/S0031-9422(00)85051-7.
- Ramirez, Dolores A.; Tomes, Mark L. (1964). "Relationship between Chlorophyll and Carotenoid Biosynthesis in Dirty-Red (Green-Flesh) Mutant in Tomato". Botanical Gazette. 125 (3): 221–226. doi:10.1086/336275. ISSN 0006-8071. S2CID 84922188.
- Mujert, Cesar V.; Ramirez, Dolores A.; Mendoza, Evelyn Mae T. (May 1984). "Coconut α-d-galactosidase isoenzymes: isolation, purification and characterization". Phytochemistry. 23 (6): 1251–1254. Bibcode:1984PChem..23.1251M. doi:10.1016/S0031-9422(00)80435-5.
- Ramirez, Dolores A. (1997). "Gene introgression in maize (Zea mays ssp mays L.)" (PDF). Philippine Journal of Crop Science. 22 (2): 51–63.
