= Ros Georgiou =

Greek fashion model

- Born: Rosanna Georgiou; 12 May 1994 (age 32); Athens, Greece
- Occupation: Fashion model
- Years active: 2010–present
- Modeling information
- Height: 1.80 m (5 ft 11 in)
- Hair color: Blonde
- Eye color: Brown
- Agency: Fusion Models (New York); IMG Models (Paris); Elite Model Management (Milan); Wilhelmina Models (London); Aethos Management (Shanghai); D Model Agency (Athens)

Rosanna Georgiou (Greek: Ροζάνα Γεωργίου; born 12 May 1994) is a Greek fashion model. She has appeared on the cover of American Vogue and Vogue Greece.

== Early life ==
Georgiou was born in Athens, Greece to a Greek father and a Dutch mother.

== Career ==
Georgiou was discovered at age 17, and debuted during the A/W 2011 season walking the runway for Céline and Dries Van Noten. The next season, she was chosen as a Calvin Klein exclusive and walked for Marni, Versace, Jil Sander, and Giambattista Valli, as well as appearing in British Vogue. Georgiou has appeared in advertisements for Marc Jacobs and Louis Vuitton. She has also modeled for Dior and Celine.

Outside of modeling, Georgiou is interested in directing and photography.
