= Rina Fukushi =

Japanese model (born 1999)

Rina Fukushi (Japanese: 福士リナ; January 27, 1999 in Manila, Philippines) is a Japanese model and singer. She was a member of the girl group Gaia.

== Life ==
She was born in Manila, Philippines to a Filipino mother and to a Japanese father. (Note: Various sources have described her father's background as being "Japanese-American"/"Japanese" and her mother being either "Filipino" or "Spanish-Filipino".) She is mixed-race and identifies as a hafu. Her mixed-race background caused her to be bullied in school, with classmates claiming that Fukushi looked "foreign". She grew up in Tokyo and speaks both Tagalog and Japanese.

She modeled for Miu Miu, Marc Jacobs, Louis Vuitton, Alexander Wang, Miuccia Prada. and Bottega Veneta.
