= Patrick Demarchelier =

French photographer (1943–2022)

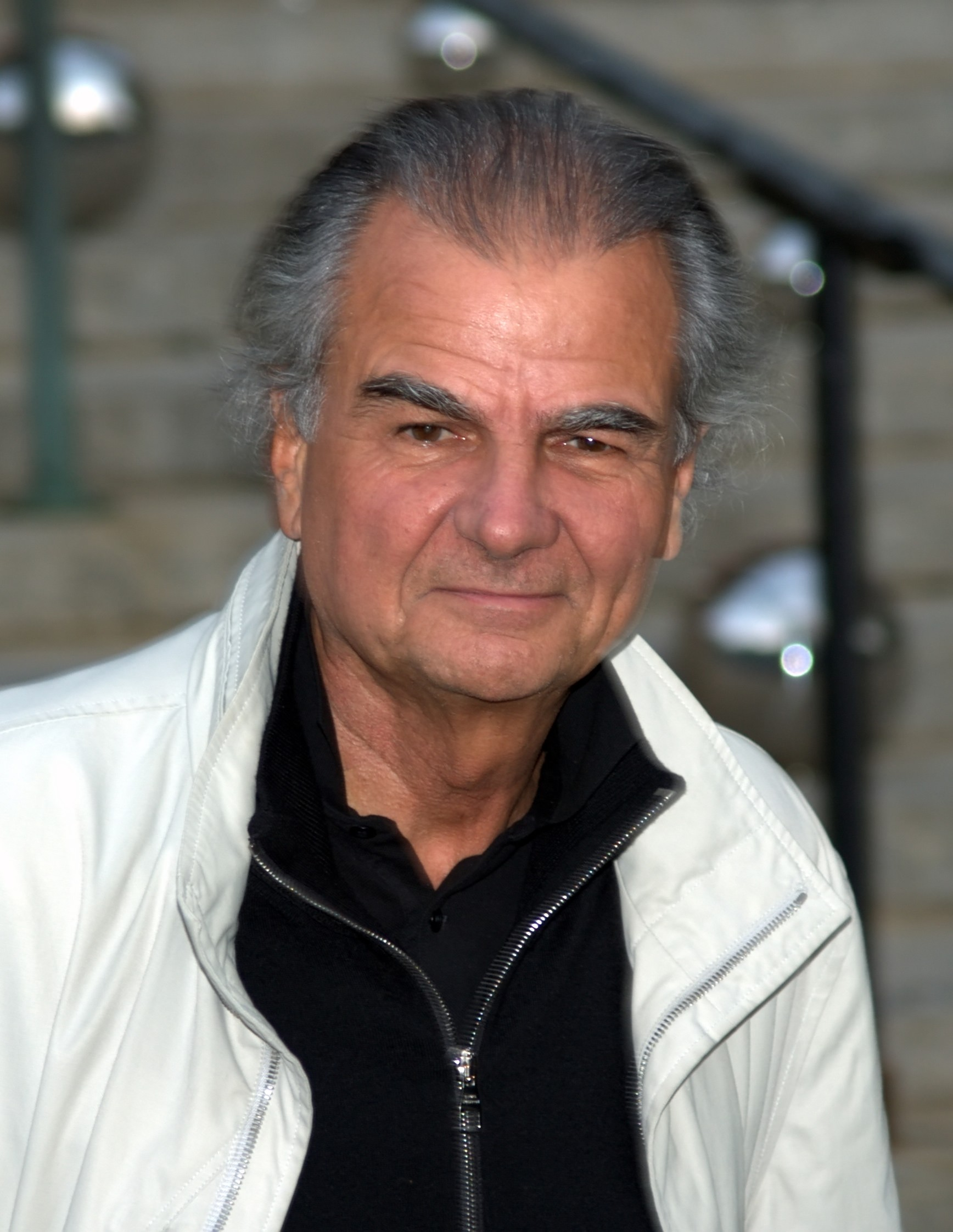
- Demarchelier at the 2010 Tribeca Film Festival
- Born: 21 August 1943; Paris, German-occupied France
- Died: 31 March 2022 (aged 78); Saint Barthélemy, France
- Occupation: Photographer
- Years active: 1975–2022
- Relatives: Héloïse Guérin (daughter-in-law)
- Website: demarchelier.com

Patrick Demarchelier (French pronunciation: [patʁik dəmaʁʃəlje]; 21 August 1943 – 31 March 2022) was a French fashion photographer.

== Early life and education ==
Born near Paris in 1943 to a modest family, Demarchelier spent his childhood in Le Havre, Normandy, with his mother and four brothers. For his seventeenth birthday, his stepfather bought him his first Eastman Kodak camera. Demarchelier learned how to develop film and retouch negatives, and began photographing friends and weddings.

== Career ==
In 1975, Demarchelier left Paris for New York City to follow his girlfriend. He discovered fashion photography by working as a freelance photographer learning from, and working with photographers such as Henri Cartier-Bresson, Terry King, and Jacque Guilbert. His work drew the attention of Elle, Marie Claire, and 20 Ans Magazine. He is perhaps best known for his intimate portraits of Princess Diana that helped establish her popularity and accessible public image.

He later worked for Vogue and Harper's Bazaar, first in September 1992 which resulted in a 12-year collaboration. Demarchelier shot international advertising campaigns for Dior, Louis Vuitton, Celine, TAG Heuer, Chanel, Donna Karan, Yves Saint Laurent, Tommy Hilfiger, Carolina Herrera, Moschino, Vera Wang, Elizabeth Arden, H&M, Sam Edelman, Zara, Max Azria, Express, Longchamp, Blumarine, Lacoste, Ann Taylor, Calvin Klein, and Ralph Lauren.

From the late 1970s on, Patrick Demarchelier photographed the covers for nearly every major fashion magazine including American, British and Paris Vogue. He also shot covers for Rolling Stone, Glamour, Life, Newsweek, Elle, and Mademoiselle. He photographed many advertising campaigns, including Farrah Fawcett shampoo in 1978, the Brooke Shields doll in 1982, Lauren by Ralph Lauren, Cutty Sark, and a Calvin Klein ad with Talisa Soto and Giorgio Armani, Chanel, GAP, Gianni Versace, L'Oréal, Elizabeth Arden, Revlon, Lancôme, and Gianfranco Ferré. He was also the primary photographer for the book On Your Own, a beauty/lifestyle guide written for young women by Brooke Shields. From 1992 on he worked with Harper's Bazaar, becoming its premier photographer. Demarchelier was awarded the contract for the 2005 Pirelli Calendar. Over the years he helped the careers of many make-up artists like Laura Mercier, Jason Marks, and Pat McGrath.

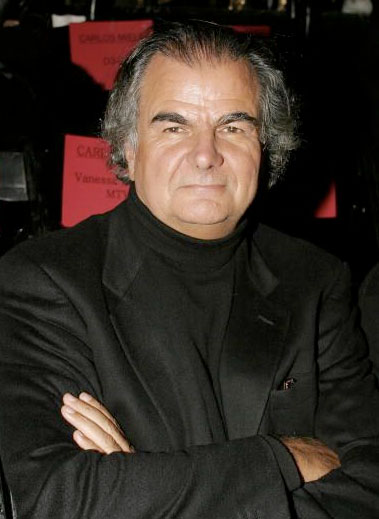
Demarchelier in 2005

In 2007, Christine Albanel, French Minister of Culture, honoured Demarchelier as an Officer in l'ordre des Arts et des Lettres (Order of Arts and Literature).

Demarchelier was listed as one of the fifty best-dressed over 50s by The Guardian in March 2013.

== Sexual harassment allegations ==
In February 2018, Demarchelier was accused by seven models who worked with him of sexual harassment. One of the highest-profile people accused during the #MeToo movement in the fashion industry, Demarchelier denied the allegations. In response to the allegations, Condé Nast announced "we have informed Patrick we will not be working with him for the foreseeable future".

== Death ==
Demarchelier died in Saint Barthélemy on 31 March 2022, at the age of 78.

== In popular culture ==
Demarchelier is referenced in the 2006 film The Devil Wears Prada.

He appeared in a cameo in the film version of Sex and the City (2008), where he can be seen taking pictures during Carrie Bradshaw's fashion shoot for Vogue.

He also appeared in the 2009 documentary The September Issue which is about Anna Wintour and American Vogue. He was called to do last-minute photographs for Grace Coddington after Edward Enninful's were not sufficient.

He was featured prominently in the sixth episode of Cycle 15 of America's Next Top Model (2010).
