= Shaira Luna =

Filipina photographer (born 1986)

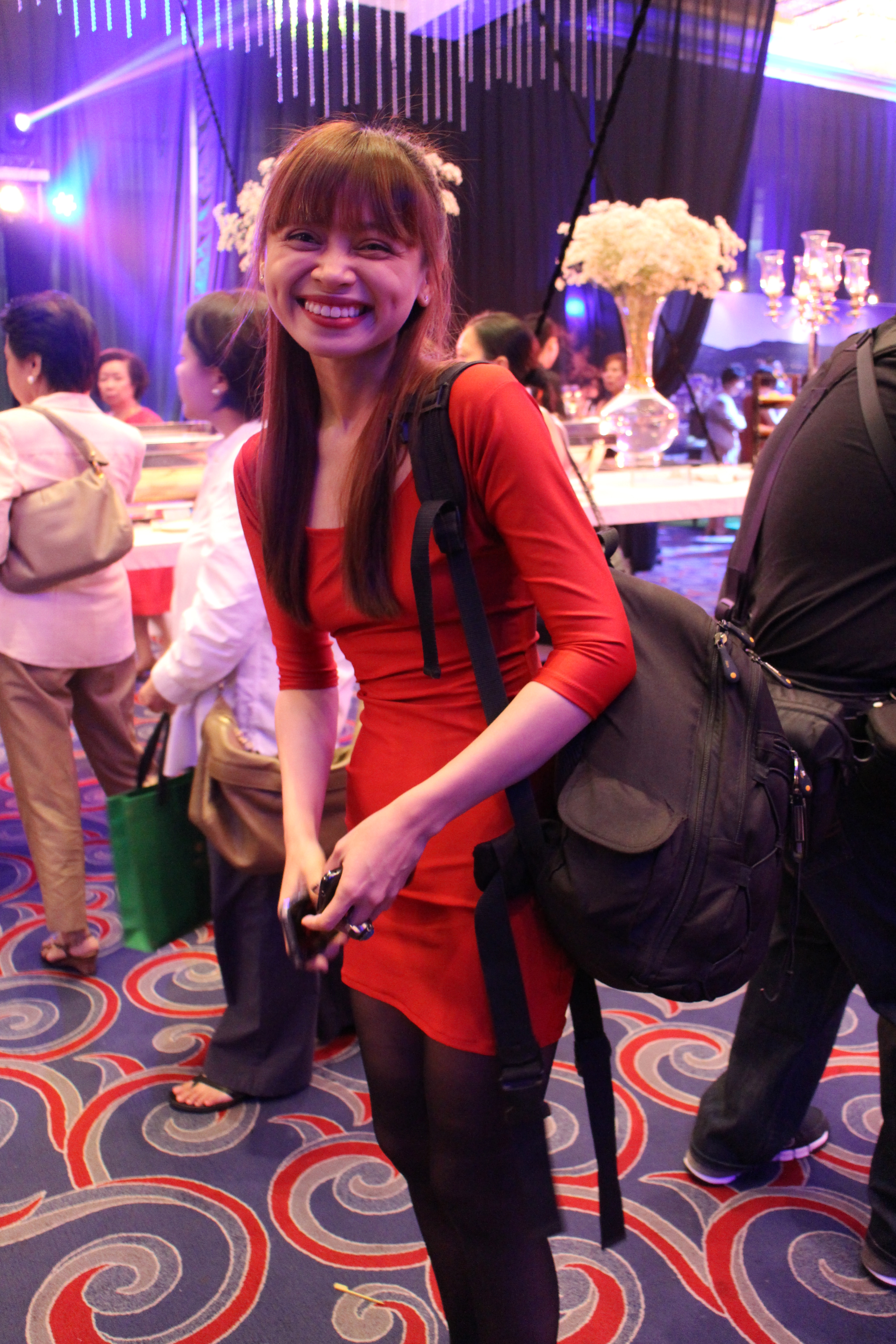
- Luna in July 2013
- Born: Shaira Ana Teresiana Luna; September 20, 1986 (age 39); Malate, Manila, Philippines
- Occupation: Photographer
- Known for: Gifted child Promil kid

Shaira Ana Teresiana Luna (born September 20, 1986) is a Filipina photographer. She, among others, was known as a "gifted child" and a "Promil kid", having been featured in Wyeth's infant formula ad in 1995.

== Early life and education ==
Shaira Luna was born on September 20, 1986, in Malate, Manila, to businessman Bong Luna and Centro Escolar University dentistry graduate Jenny Luna. Both her parents were in their middle 20's when she was conceived. As an infant, Luna reportedly began speaking fluently as early as six months, and could read and write the alphabet at age one. At age two, Luna became knowledgeable in different branches of science and played various musical instruments including the piano and the violin. While she spoke English fluently, she also developed interests in learning the French and Spanish languages.

Luna's parents then sought professionals' help due to these abilities their daughter experienced. A personnel from the Department of Education, Cultural Studies (DECS) discovered that Luna had the IQ of a sixth grader, similar to that of a high-school student. According to Jenny Luna, her daughter's intelligence might have been a result of heredity, as her family consists of achievers who graduated from school with honors. She was then advised to have her daughter attend a sixth-grade class at the Philippine Christian University (PCU), as she would easily get bored in a kindergarten class. Another reason Luna was enrolled at PCU was to improve her social skills, since she had the tendency to be reserved.

Luna was 13 years old when she enrolled at De La Salle University, to earn a Bachelor of Science in human biology. After shifting to different courses, she dropped out in 2006.

== Career ==
While a student at De La Salle University, Luna bought a Canon EOS 350D (her first digital single-lens reflex camera) and dabbled in photography for six months, during which she would "literally shoot everything: I tried portraits, I tried food... I would shoot events, birthdays, binyag (Christening), fiesta, basketball ng liga (basketball leagues). Minsan libing din (Sometimes funerals too)." In a 2015 interview with When In Manila, she said that "Photography was really just a hobby during college. My career developed very gradually and organically—I really went through everything before it even occurred to me that this was something that could be done for a living!" She described her expertise in the field as "self-taught".

== See also ==
- Xyza Cruz Bacani
