= Linda Vojtová =

Czech model (born 1985)

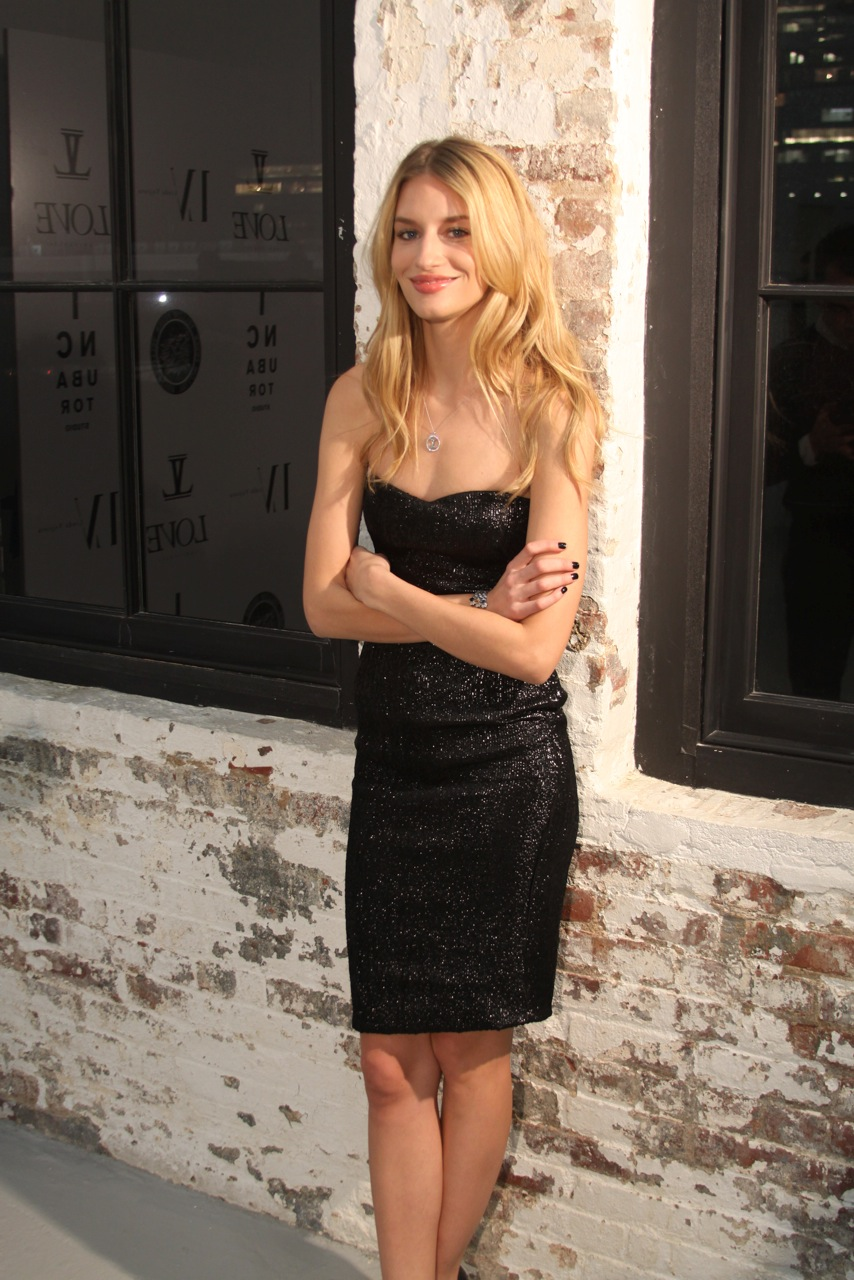
- Linda Vojtová
- Born: Linda Vojtová; 22 June 1985 (age 41); Prague, Czech Republic
- Other name: Baby Gisele
- Modeling information
- Height: 1.78 m (5 ft 10 in)
- Hair color: Dark Blonde
- Eye color: Blue
- Agency: Women/360 Management (New York); Oui Management (Paris); Monster Management (Milan); The Squad (London); Elite Model Management (Amsterdam, Copenhagen); Traffic Models (Barcelona); Modelwerk (Hamburg); Public Image Management (Montreal); MP Stockholm (Stockholm)

Linda Vojtová (born 22 June 1985 in Prague, Czech Republic) is a Czech model. She was the winner of the world final of Elite Model Look in 2000, held in Geneva, Switzerland. Since then, she has appeared in various international magazine publications including Vogue, ELLE, Harpers Bazaar, Glamour, Amica, Surface, Marie Claire and others. She is best known for her collaborations with Victoria's Secret, Max Mara, Giorgio Armani, La Perla, L'oreal, Escada, Diesel. Her maternal grandfather is composer Vadim Petrov.

== Early life ==
Vojtova was born in Prague, Czech Republic. Her mother Tatjana Vojtová was a lawyer and her father Karel Vojta was a lawyer and high school teacher. She grew up with her older brother Martin.

== Modelling career ==
In 1999, aged 14, Vojtová was scouted at a shopping mall in Prague. Her first modelling trips were to Milan and Vienna, while she was still a mid-teen.

In 2000, Vojtová finished first in the Czech national Elite Model Look of the Year contest, and went on to win the World Elite Model Look contest in Geneva, Switzerland, signing a three-year contract with Elite Model Agency Worldwide.

At the age of 15, while still in high school, Vojtová began travelling all over the world to work. During this time, photographer Ellen von Unwerth chose her to be the face of the fashion brand Miss Sixty, which gave Vojtová her first break into the fashion industry.

In 2002, she attended her first New York Fashion Week, and was booked for her first American Vogue photo shoot with photographer Steven Meisel. She has appeared at 14 consecutive fashion week seasons in New York, Milan and Paris, and has been the face of many fashion brands and cosmetics campaigns.

== Music projects ==
Vojtová is the curator of her grandfather Vadim Petrov's music. Together with her mother Tatjana, she organizes concerts of his music in the Czech Republic.

== Personal life ==
As well as Czech, she speaks Slovak and English. She lives in New York City.
