= Arizona Muse =

American fashion model (born 1988)

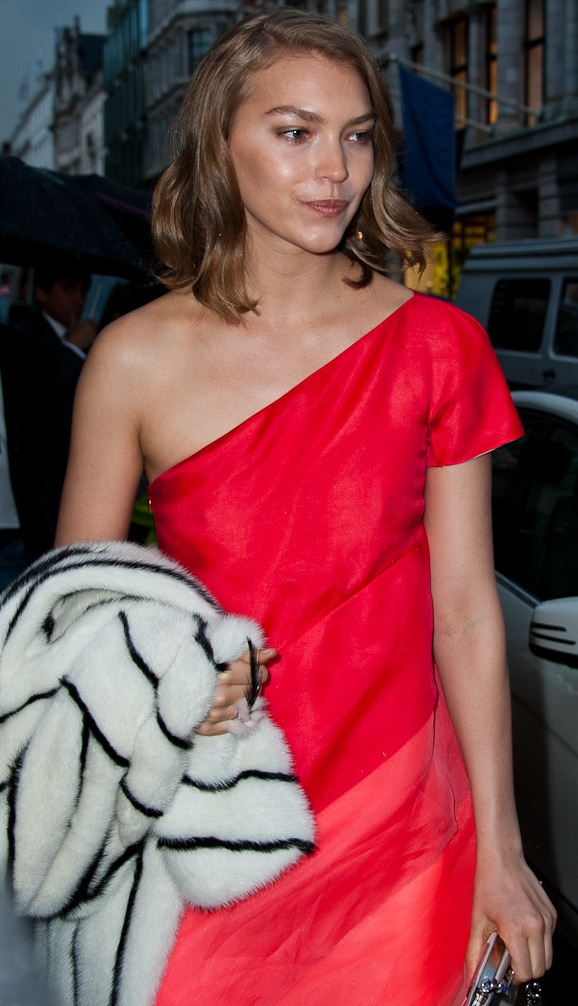
- Muse in London; 2014
- Born: Arizona Grace Muse; September 18, 1988 (age 38); Tucson, Arizona, U.S.
- Spouse: Boniface Verney-Carron (m. 2017)
- Children: 2
- Modeling information
- Height: 1.78 m (5 ft 10 in)
- Hair color: Brown
- Eye color: Green
- Agency: DNA Model Management (New York); Oui Management (Paris); Premier Model Management (London); Next Management (Milan, Los Angeles); Red Eleven Model Management (Auckland); Le Management (Copenhagen); Modelwerk (Hamburg); Stockholmsgruppen (Stockholm); Chic Management (Sydney)

Arizona Grace Muse (born September 18, 1988) is an American model.

== Early life ==
Muse was born in Tucson, Arizona, and raised in Santa Fe, New Mexico. Her father is American and her mother is British.

== Career ==
Muse began modeling as a teenager but her career did not begin until 2009 after she had her son Nikko.

Muse has appeared in editorials in French, American, Chinese, British, Korean, Spanish, Portuguese, Russian, and Italian Vogue, W, V, Numéro, and Dazed & Confused. The March 2011 issue of Dazed & Confused was dedicated to her.

Muse has appeared on the cover of the Chinese, Australian, Spanish, Greek, Korean, Mexican, Portuguese, Russian, Turkish and Ukrainian Vogue and Numéro (shot by Karl Lagerfeld), and Dazed & Confused. She appeared on the November 2011 cover of Vogue Paris (shot by Inez van Lamsweerde and Vinoodh Matadin).

In 2013 she appeared in a Louis Vuitton ad along with David Bowie.

== Personal life ==
Muse has a son named Nikko Quintana Muse (born April 14, 2009), with ex-fiancé Manuel Quintana. She married Boniface Verney-Carron in London in 2017. Their daughter was born in 2018.
