= Vogue Greece =

Greek fashion magazine

- Cover of the April 2024 issue, Naomi Campbell by Nick Knight
- Editor-in-Chief: Elis Kiss
- Categories: Fashion
- Frequency: Monthly (11x per year)
- Publisher: Alexia Koronaiou
- Total circulation: 478,000 (2012)
- First issue: April 2000; 26 years ago
- Company: Lyberis Publications (2000–2012); Kathimerines Ekdoseis (2019–present)
- Country: Greece
- Based in: Athens
- Language: Greek
- Website: vogue.gr
- ISSN: 1108-6653

Vogue Greece (stylised in all caps), previously published as Vogue Hellas, is a Greek monthly fashion magazine that covers ready-to-wear fashion, haute couture,

beauty, lifestyle, and weddings. Previously published by Lyberis Publications, since 2019 the magazine is published under licence by Kathimerines Ekdoseis. Since 2024, Elis Kiss has served as editor-in-chief.

Based in the Piraeus neighbourhood of Athens. Vogue Hellas began publication in 2000 as the Greek edition of Vogue, it ceased publication in 2012. In 2019, it re-started publication as Vogue Greece.

== History ==
In March 2000, Vogue Hellas started publication in Greece by Lyberis Publications. In 2012, Lyberis went bankrupt and the magazine ceased publication. Elena Makri served as the editor-in-chief for the entirety of the original publication run of Vogue Hellas.

In April 2019, the Greek edition of Vogue was relaunched as Vogue Greece. The magazine is published under licence by Kathimerines Ekdoseis. Thaleia Karafyllidou served as editor-in-chief from 2019 to 2024. Elis Kiss was appointed editor-in-chief in 2024.
