= Willie Christie =

British photographer and film director (born 1948)

- Born: William Lawrence Christie; 14 November 1948 (age 77)
- Occupations: Photographer; film director
- Spouses: Grace Coddington (m. 1976; div. 1980) Amanda Nimmo (m. 1991)
- Relatives: Carolyne Christie (sister); Lawrence Dundas, 3rd Marquess of Zetland (uncle)
- Website: williechristie.com

William Lawrence Christie (born 14 November 1948) is a British fashion photographer and film director.

== Early life ==
Christie was born in 1948. He left Eton aged 17. At 19 he worked on Richard Burton and Elizabeth Taylor's yacht, Kalizma for a month, before working, aged 19, as assistant to fashion photographer David Anthony. In 1973 he appeared on Top of the Pops 'playing' bass with Roxy Music.

== Fashion photography ==
In 1969 he was asked by the journalist BP Fallon to photograph the Rolling Stones who were rehearsing in the Beatles' Apple Studios for their concert in Hyde Park following the death of Brian Jones.

Clive Arrowsmith took him under his wing later that year. He stayed for a year whilst Clive worked for UK Vogue and others. Christie met his future wife, Grace Coddington during this period.

In 1970 Christie went freelance as a photographer. Commissions were slow but over the next three years he built a portfolio with work from Harpers Queen, Honey and Over 21 amongst others.

Christie continued photographing both fashion and celebrities. Cary Grant, Douglas Fairbanks Jnr and Grace Jones being just three.

He produced portraits for David Bowie, Cliff Richards, King Crimson and many more. In 1983, he directed a four-song video for Pink Floyd's The Final Cut album, whose sleeve also featured his photography. The band's bassist Roger Waters was at the time married to his older sister, Lady Carolyne Anne Christie. He also designed and took photographs for the sleeve of the 1973 Robert Fripp and Brian Eno album "(No Pussyfooting)".

In 1982, he began directing commercials. Many of which won various awards including Creative Circle, Lions @ Cannes, Clio, International Film and TV Festival of New York.

Willie Christie's work has been showcased in Vision Gallery (Arizona), the Little Black Gallery, selected for the RA's Summer Exhibition 2011 and his Mick Jagger portrait of 1969 was selected for the international tour of Recontres D'Arles' 2010 exhibition. Still rolling, this exhibition moved from the Da Vinci Museum, Tokyo on 29 July 2013.

He wrote and directed the 1998 film The Whisper, based on a short story by Anton Chekhov starring Michael Gough, Jamie Glover and fourteen-year-old Emma Pierson. It showed at Festivals around the world and made it to the BAFTA short list that year.

He directed a limited run of Siren by David Williamson at London's Grace Theatre in 2000.

in 2012 Christie was named as one of Justin de Villeneuve's influences, along with Avedon and Bert Stern.

In 2012, he was one of eighty artists selected to decorate a BT Artbox. The box sold on eBay for £620, in aid of the charity Childline.

== Recent life ==
An original contemporary drama-thriller, 'Woman in a Black Hat' and his adaptation of Peter Cheyney's mystery spy thriller, Ladies Won't Wait are both currently in development.

In October 2013 Willie Christie was confirmed as the director and headline presenter of a docu-reality TV show currently in development focusing on style photography.

== Personal life ==
Christies's parents were Hector Lorenzo Christie and Lady Jean Agatha Dundas. His mother's father was Lawrence John Lumley Dundas, 2nd Marquess of Zetland and so he is nephew to Lawrence Aldred Mervyn Dundas, 3rd Marquess of Zetland, and a cousin to both Mark Dundas, 4th Marquess of Zetland and Lord David Dundas. His nephew, through Carolyne and Roger Waters, is the musician Harry Waters.

He was first married to Grace Coddington. The marriage was dissolved in 1980. Christie has been married to his current wife Amanda, daughter of the actor Derek Nimmo, since 1991. They have two children. He also has an older daughter Scarlett and Amanda has a son.
