= Art Partner =

Creative talent agency in New York City, US

- Industry: Fashion, Luxury
- Founded: 1992
- Founder: Giovanni Testino
- Headquarters: New York City, United States
- Key people: Amber Olsen Testino, Candice Marks, Brigitte Sondag
- Website: artpartner.com

Art Partner is an international creative agency specialising in the fashion, luxury, and beauty sectors. Founded in 1992, the agency operates offices in London, Paris, Milan, New York, and Shanghai, and represents a global roster of creative talent. Art Partner works with fashion and luxury brands such as Prada, Miu Miu, Saint Laurent, Gucci, Calvin Klein, and Zara, as well as editorial publications including Vogue, Harper’s Bazaar, The Gentlewoman, Dazed, i-D, and Self Service. The agency offers services including artist representation, creative direction, brand strategy, content production, cultural programming, and consulting.

== History ==
Art Partner was founded in 1992 by Giovanni Testino and his brother, fashion photographer Mario Testino. Prior to establishing the agency, Giovanni Testino worked in the shipping industry during the 1980s, gaining experience in logistics and operations. The concept for the agency emerged following a chance meeting between the brothers in Los Angeles. With initial backing from Yasuko Austin, the brothers launched Art Partner in New York.

By the mid-1990s, Art Partner represented photographers including Mario Testino, Mert Alas & Marcus Piggott, Glen Luchford, and Steven Klein, along with stylists such as Camilla Nickerson and Melanie Ward, and beauty creatives like Charlotte Tilbury and Didier Malige. In the late 1990s, senior agent Amber Olsen Testino opened a liaison office in Paris, marking the agency’s first formal expansion beyond New York.

During the 2000s, Art Partner broadened its services to include creative direction, styling, hair and makeup representation, and in-house content strategy and production. It later opened offices in London, positioning itself as a key talent and creative consultancy for global fashion and luxury brands. The agency continued to work with major fashion houses and editorial publications worldwide.

== Artists ==
Art Partner represents a roster of internationally recognised photographers whose work has been central to the development of contemporary fashion imagery. Among its represented artists are David Sims, Mario Sorrenti, and Mert Alas & Marcus Piggott, who emerged as significant figures in luxury advertising and editorial photography throughout the 1990s. A younger generation of image-makers, including Harley Weir, Tyler Mitchell and Drew Vickers, reflect the agency’s continued engagement with emerging voices in fashion and culture. Their work is noted for its intimate, socially conscious, and multidisciplinary approach, bridging fine art and commercial practice. In addition to photographers, Art Partner represents talent across related creative fields, including styling, creative direction, beauty, casting as well as a cultural architect division dedicated exclusively to Hans Ulrich Obrist.

== Earth Partner ==
Earth Partner is the sustainability division of Art Partner, established to promote environmentally responsible practices across the agency's operations and creative projects. Certified Carbon Neutral® since 2017, the division promotes sustainable production on set and in offices across New York, London, and Paris. Earth Partner also supports creative climate action through year-round initiatives and partnerships with artists, policymakers, businesses, and organisations. Supported by Marina Testino, its partners include the United Nations, GEF, World Land Trust, Flourishing Diversity, and the Ellen MacArthur Foundation.

Its central program, the Earth Partner Prize (previously #CreateCOP), is an international competition inviting young creatives to address environmental and social challenges through any artistic medium. Eight finalists receive cash prizes of $10,000, $5,000, or $2,000. Past judges include Anja Rubik, Marcelo Vieira da Silva Junior, Gabriela Hearst, Livia Firth, Francisco Costa, Wilson Oryema, Dr. Subodh Kerkar, and Lidia Arthur Brito. The initiative has been covered in publications such as Vogue, the Financial Times, Document Journal, Atmos, and Fast Company. Its finalists’ works have been exhibited globally at events including the United Nations, Photo London, and Shanghai Climate Week. In 2025, the Prize was presented at the Vatican’s Borgo Laudato Si’, featuring 55 works from past editions in dialogue with Pope Francis’ vision of integral ecology.
