= Tatjana Patitz =

German fashion model (1966–2023)

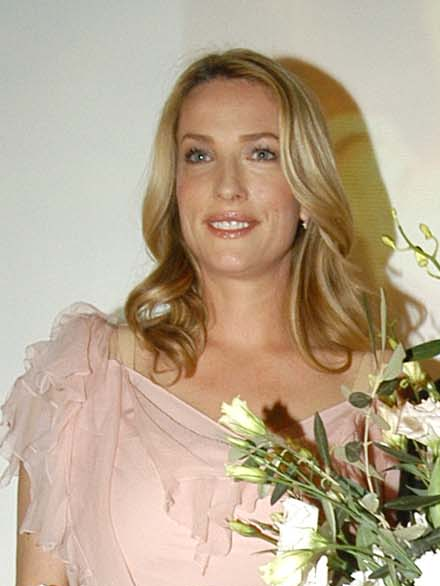
- Patitz in 2005
- Born: May 25, 1966; Hamburg, West Germany
- Died: January 11, 2023 (aged 56); Santa Barbara, California, U.S.
- Spouse: Jason Randall Johnson
- Children: 1
- Modeling information
- Height: 5 ft 11 in (1.80 m)
- Hair color: Dark blonde
- Eye color: Blue
- Agency: Next Management (New York, Los Angeles); VIVA Model Management (Paris, London, Barcelona); d'management group (Milan); Elite Model Management (Amsterdam); Mega Model Agency (Hamburg); Munich Models (Munich)

Tatjana Patitz (25 May 1966 – 11 January 2023) was a German fashion model. She achieved international prominence in the 1980s and 1990s representing fashion designers on runways and in magazines such as Elle, Harper's Bazaar, and Vogue. She was one of the "Big 5" supermodels who appeared in the 1990 music video "Freedom! '90" by George Michael, and she was associated with the editorial, advertising, and fine-art works of photographers Herb Ritts and Peter Lindbergh.

In the book Models of Influence: 50 Women Who Reset The Course of Fashion, author Nigel Barker reviewed Patitz's career during the height of the supermodel era in the 1980s and 1990s, writing that she possessed an exoticism and broad emotional range that set her apart from her peers. In her 2012 memoir, Vogue creative director Grace Coddington called Patitz one of the original supermodels and a must in photographs and on the catwalk. Harper's Bazaar wrote, "Patitz's features almost confuse. Like Garbo or the Mona Lisa, the inexplicable gifts of line and luminescence defy definition." Vogue editor-in-chief Anna Wintour stated that Patitz had always been one of her favourite models. Patitz's work bridged the eras of the exhibitionist 1980s and the minimalist 1990s in an enduring way, as Barker concluded, "The most lasting images of her are when she was really looking like herself." Author Linda Sivertsen noted that Patitz is greatly responsible for establishing the acceptance of statuesque and curvaceous beauty in an industry of extreme thinness.

Patitz was an avid horsewoman who continued her lifelong passion for animals and the environment by campaigning for ecological causes and animal rights. Her design aesthetic for residential architecture and home design in her adoptive home state of California was recognised internationally.

== Early life ==
Patitz was born in Hamburg in West Germany. Her father was a German travel writer, and her mother was an Estonian dancer. Patitz grew up primarily in Skanör, Sweden. She learned to ride horses at the age of seven and spent summers at her family's vacation home on Mallorca in Spain, where she participated in horse camps. About her love of horses, Patitz said, "I have been riding since I was a small child. For me, it means freedom, connectedness, and dedication. Horses transform stress and worry for me. They are genuine and spiritual. They make me happy and relaxed, especially if I feel pressured or tense."

== Career ==
=== 1980s ===
In 1983 at the age of 17, Patitz entered and became a finalist in the Elite Model Look (formerly known as Elite Models' "Look of the Year" contest), and based on a Polaroid, she was placed third by Elite Model Management founder John Casablancas. Patitz won a contract and moved to Paris to begin working as a model. Though not an immediate success, by 1985, Patitz worked regularly and at the end of that year, she modelled for the cover of British Vogue, her first major cover.

Also that year she began to work with photographer Peter Lindbergh with whom she cultivated a 30-year collaborative relationship which contributed to the launch of the supermodel era. In his book, 10 Women, Lindbergh wrote, "I admire Tatjana because she always stays herself. She's very soft, but at the same time she's very strong and knows how to stand up for what she thinks, and it's always very enriching to be with her. It's impossible not to admire her and over the years not to be just a little bit in love with her."

Patitz's success in Europe, which included an editorial for the 1985 September issue of French Vogue by master photographer Horst P. Horst, led her to New York City where she worked for American Vogue and such photographers as Irving Penn, Helmut Newton, Steven Meisel, Denis Piel, Sheila Metzner, and Wayne Maser. She also worked with Gilles Bensimon at Elle and Francesco Scavullo at Cosmopolitan.

The December 1985 issue of Vogue featured Irving Penn's photograph, "Colored Contact Lenses", showing Patitz wearing contact lenses over closed eyelids. The image would later be featured in the 1992 book On The Edge: Images from 100 Years of Vogue as one of the iconic photographs of the era.

In 1986, she appeared on two covers of the Italian edition of Vogue and continued to be featured in editorials in the American and British editions of Vogue. Patitz appeared in campaigns for Calvin Klein photographed by Bruce Weber, and in 1987 for Revlon's "The Most Unforgettable Women in the World" campaign photographed by Richard Avedon. Avedon also photographed Patitz for her first cover of American Vogue (May 1987), which is regarded as one of the definitive covers of the 1980s. Vogue began regularly including Patitz's name on the pages of fashion editorials as early as 1987, familiarising readers not only with her face, but also with her personality. "What immediately strikes me about her is her extraordinary kindness and her star quality," stated photographer Antoine Verglas.

When Tiffany's celebrated its 150th anniversary in 1987, Patitz appeared on the cover of their magazine's special issue with ballet dancer Mikhail Baryshnikov and she was named the model discovery of the year for her gleaming and radiant looks.

During this period, Patitz met Los Angeles-based photographer Herb Ritts, with whom she shared another significant and enduring collaboration in fashion, fine art, and commercial work, like a muse playing any role he suggested—mermaid, sprite, surfer girl, plainswoman, movie star. Ritts said of Patitz, "Her features are a bit off; she's not a typical, commercial beauty, but when I shoot her, I'm never bored. Her looks have power, strength, intensity." Patitz is the subject of Tatjana Veiled Head (Tight View), Joshua Tree 1988, one of Ritts' most celebrated works.

As Patitz's career escalated, she was credited with expanding ideals of female beauty. Patitz and a select group of individual-looking, business-minded, high-profile fashion models emerged and came to be known as the original supermodels. An image of Patitz with other models laughing on the beach was photographed by Peter Lindbergh for Vogue during this period. Titled "White Cotton Shirts", the photograph is regarded as an iconic fashion photograph and was accompanied by an article that singled out Patitz for her "astonishing presence", praising her "uncosmeticised womanliness, new and important in the 1980s."

At just shy of six feet tall, Teutonically self-composed, and dominating any room she cared to walk into [sic], Tatjana was the biggest beast in the seething jungle; Vogue amplified the comparison by fixating on her lynx-like eyes, impossibly blue and curved around the temples like a cat's.

— Vogue Model: The Faces of Fashion.

In another 1988 Vogue article titled "Tatjana: Million Dollar Beauty", Patitz's creative team shared their impressions of her: "In pictures, her sensitivity is what comes through; something delicate, fragile, exciting. It's a strange mixture of lazy sensuality and moments of intense emotion," said John Casablancas, president of Elite Model Management. "It's hard to get a bad picture of Tatjana. She's very photogenic, which is very rare, and she looks different in every light," added photographer Patrick Demarchelier. "While some models develop one look, she has many."

Her versatility was exemplified by her ever-changing hair color and style with each passing year – from short-haired brunette to tawny mane to long and blond. For an April 1989 editorial titled "Earthly Powers" in British Vogue, hair stylist Didier Malige cut and restyled Patitz's foot-long blonde hair into a cropped shag just above her shoulders. Considered by some industry insiders as a drastic mistake, the risk paid off. "Once I cut my hair – I cried for two months," Patitz told Esquire. "People said, 'We can't believe she cut her hair.'" But the move won Patitz covers of British and French editions of Vogue featuring her new look.

The pinnacle of that year came in July and August when Patitz was awarded with consecutive covers of American Vogue. Being on Vogue's cover two months in a row was a rare achievement for a model of that time and an innovation for the recently revamped Vogue under the leadership of new editor-in-chief Anna Wintour. This period was the zenith of Patitz's career, known as "the era of Tatjana" in the fashion industry – a whirlwind time when she seemed destined to walk away with the title of supermodel herself. Britain's SKY Magazine called Patitz the first German supermodel and noted that her success led the Elite agency to open a branch in Germany."

At this point, being in such demand required constant travel for Patitz, who flew 40 flights in one month alone. In an effort to live a healthier and more balanced lifestyle, Patitz began slowing down her modelling career to focus on other creative pursuits such as writing, acting, and meditation. She relocated to California and made Los Angeles her homebase. The move afforded Patitz, who had always searched for creative and spiritual growth, the time and space to develop other aspects of her life.

I don't want to do anything for fame or money or glamour or anything like that...I think people are coming to a higher awareness in the world. Everything is polluted – the oceans, the forests ... and people are killing each other all over the place without realizing that we all belong together and have to share this place. Maybe I'm dreaming, but I'm hopeful.

— Tatjana Patitz, Model Magazine, December 1989.

=== 1990s ===
In the final months of 1989, Patitz was photographed with her peers in two group portraits that would become defining images of the forthcoming supermodel era of the 1990s: Stephanie, Cindy, Christy, Tatjana, Naomi, Hollywood by Herb Ritts; and Peter Lindbergh's cover of the January 1990 issue of British Vogue. The international press began recognising supermodels as the icons of the day, noting that female ideals were no longer only dictated by fashion editors or reflective of male fantasies – but representative of where women stand now and what they aspire to.

1990 began with Patitz gracing the January covers of both American and British Vogue. She shared the British Vogue cover with Naomi Campbell, Cindy Crawford, Linda Evangelista, and Christy Turlington; the portrait of the five women is regarded as the cover that sparked the supermodel phenomenon of the 1990s, helping each woman attain global appeal. The accompanying article proclaimed that each woman – in her early 20s and already million-dollar-plus a year earners – was emphatically individual, conforming less to a formula, and united by a confidence born of maturity.

The January British Vogue cover inspired singer George Michael to cast Patitz, Crawford, Evangelista, Turlington, and Campbell in his music video for the song "Freedom! '90" which was directed by David Fincher. Michael did not appear in the video; instead, each woman would lip-synch the song in Michael's place. While Patitz and her co-stars were already the top stars in the fashion world, they won major recognition for their beauty and charisma outside of it too. The music video was programmed into heavy rotation on MTV, going on to transcend the worlds of pop culture, music, and fashion in the 1990s and remaining influential and iconic in the decades to come. The media dubbed Crawford, Campbell, Turlington, Evangelista, and Patitz "the big five."

"Like other famous beauties before her, Tatjana Patitz possesses a certain extraterrestrial quality, an aura of exquisite otherworldliness only too effortlessly capable of freezing mere mortals in their tracks...She's the fitting embodiment of the nineties ideal: a cool customer who knows what she wants and knows how to get it. Rarely have blonde hair and blue eyes managed to look quite so exotic – with her trademark world-weary gaze and her loose-limbed aristocratic bearing, Patitz often seems as if she's just been awakened from a divinely decadent dream."

— Elle, April 1990

Settled in Los Angeles, Patitz continued to manage her modelling career while studying acting. She worked with Ritts, Lindbergh, and Maser but was sought after by the industry's leading female photographers such as Peggy Sirota, Ellen Von Unwerth, Pamela Hanson, and Sheila Metzner as well as new photographers such as Mario Sorrenti and Juergen Teller. Los Angeles-based photographers Phillip Dixon and Matthew Rolston also frequently photographed Patitz for Harper's Bazaar. Rolston said of Patitz: "I look for more than beauty. There must be a memorable quality. Tatjana has it more than anyone else. She sticks in your mind. There's a depth, an emotional quality to her that's truly extraordinary. She's very dear, charming and extremely feminine. She's very open and her priorities are natural things – animals, the sea, the environment. That's what's so interesting about her. She's not what she seems."

As the decade progressed, Patitz worked in advertising campaigns and on runways for fashion houses as Chanel, Versace, Salvatore Ferragamo, Valentino, Karl Lagerfeld, Helmut Lang, Donna Karan, Jean Paul Gaultier, and Vivienne Westwood. Perhaps most notably, Patitz was the long-standing face of Jil Sander, representing the designer's minimalist style in ad campaigns photographed by Nick Knight.

Patitz shared another cover with the supermodels of the era for the centennial issue of Vogue (April 1992) photographed by Patrick Demarchelier. Also in 1992, it was announced that Patitz had won an exclusive cosmetics contract with Germaine Monteil makeup and perfumes. In an interview with Harper's Bazaar, Monteil's Vice-President of Marketing Worldwide, Susan Wells noted that the cosmetics company searched for a woman with a globally recognised name and beauty who had an accessible face that women could relate to. That year, New York magazine named Patitz one of the top 10 supermodels in the world, epitomising modern beauty and grace – and changing monolithic ideals of perfection.

As of 1997 Patitz had appeared on over 200 magazine covers worldwide, including seven covers of American Vogue and thirteen covers of British Vogue. French, Italian, German, Spanish, and Australian editions of Vogue have also featured Patitz on their covers and in editorials photographed by photographers such as Max Vadukul, Sante D'Orazio, Mikael Jannson, Arthur Elgort, Hans Feurer, Walter Chin, and Javier Vallhonrat. International editions of Vogue and Elle have also profiled Patitz for her signature home design and decor style including a cover story for the April 1997 edition of Elle Decor UK.

=== 2000s ===
Patitz began the new millennium continuing to work with top photographers at major fashion magazines such as the 2000 editorial in Vogue Italia titled, "Magnetic" by Paolo Roversi. In the May/June 2000 issue of V magazine, Patitz was photographed by Inez and Vinoodh in a series of portraits with fellow supermodels Christy Turlington, Stephanie Seymour, and Iman. Patitz joined Chinese supermodel and actress Qu Ying at an exhibition in Beijing for Longines, a brand Patitz would represent throughout the decade. She also returned to the cover of Harper's Bazaar for its Chinese edition.

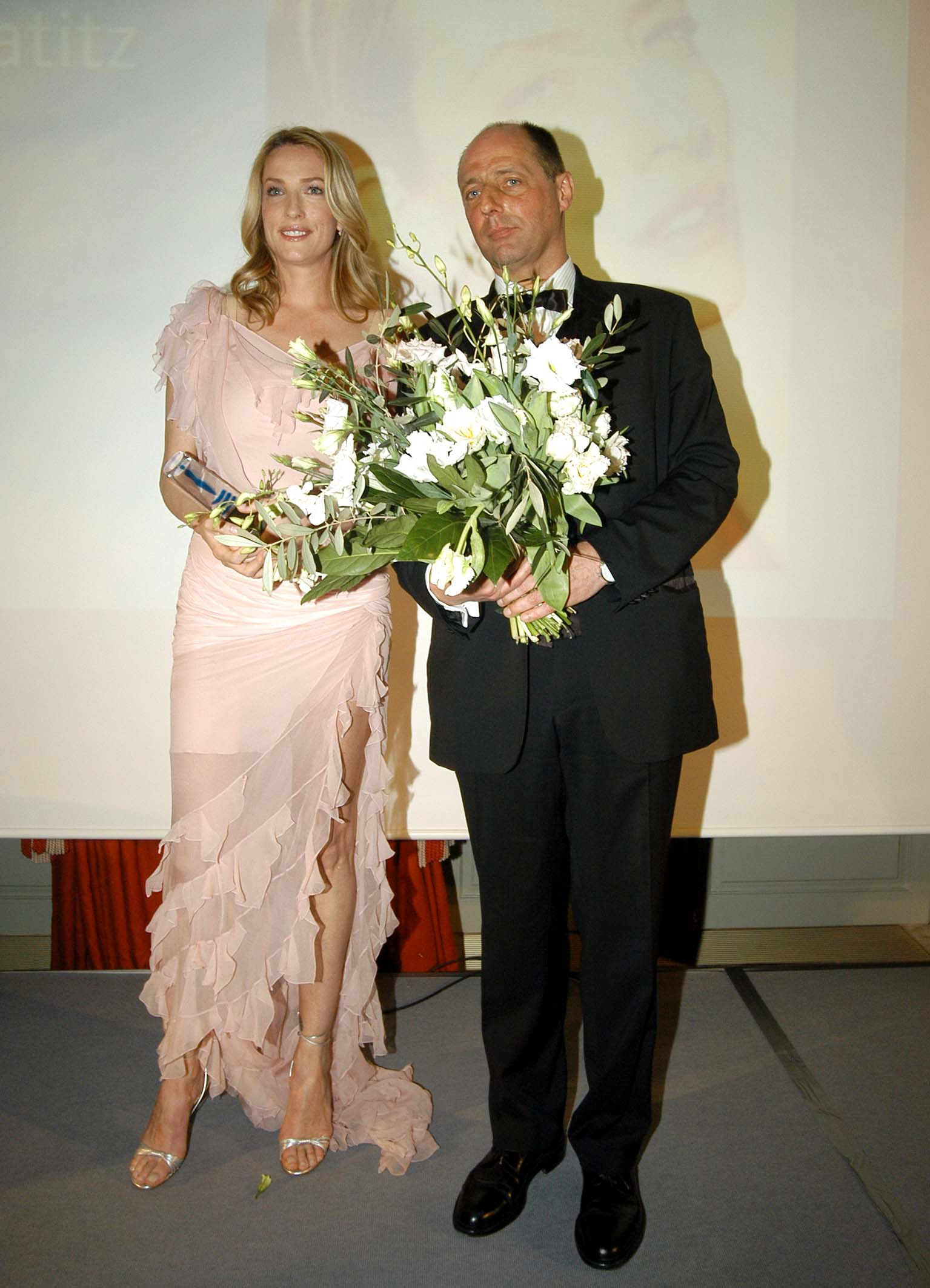
Tatjana Patitz – Personality Award, 2005

In 2001, she was the face of the Jil Sander No. 4 fragrance campaign as well as being the cover star of the July issue of Elle UK and the September issue of Italian Elle. Peter Lindbergh, Patitz's most frequent collaborator, photographed her for the Spring/Summer 2003 Kookai campaign.

In 2004, Patitz starred in the Fall/Winter campaign for Jigsaw, photographed by Juergen Teller and Sand Copenhagen. Teller would include Patitz in his portfolio on fashion's original cover models for the September 2006 issue of W magazine. The series of portraits is notable for the inclusion of fashion icons throughout different eras and decades, including Cheryl Tiegs, Christie Brinkley, Paulina Porizkova, and Shalom Harlow. Patitz's contemporaries such as Naomi Campbell, Stephanie Seymour, Cindy Crawford, and Christy Turlington are also included.

Patitz continued to be an advocate for animal rights by filming a PSA in 2007 for Orangutan Outreach and appealing for the protection of orangutans in the rain forests of Borneo, Indonesia.

Still representing cosmetics brands and designers such as L'Oréal and Uniqlo, Patitz returned to the runway for Helmut Lang, including his Fall/Winter 2000 presentation, regarded by Vogue as one of the most unforgettable fashion shows of all time.

In July 2008, Patitz's interior design style was celebrated in the publication Livingetc for using recycled materials such as reclaimed timber and stone which she found by scouring salvage yards – from limestone kitchen floors to wooden ceiling beams and staircase. It was reported that she lived on her ranch with her five-year-old son Jonah, four horses, four dogs and two cats ("I needed nature around me").

Patitz closed out the decade by returning to the runway in 2009 for designer Jean Paul Gaultier, closing his Fall/Winter collection for Hermes during the finale.

=== 2010s ===
In the 2010s, the scope of Patitz's work focused on issues relating to inclusivity, HIV awareness, LGBTQ rights, ageism, and gender equality while remaining in the pages and on the covers of Vogue, Marie Claire and Elle. Notably, Patitz's work and career were examined in articles by a new generation of distinguished writers such as Chloe Malle and Janelle Okwodu, who recognised Patitz for her enduring legacy in projecting different representations of women.

When Karl Lagerfeld staged his "Coco on the Lido" 2010 cruise collection on the boardwalk along the Venice Lido, he cast Patitz as an Edwardian mother to poetically reinvent the mystique of Coco Chanel's favourite locales. At the conclusion of the show, Lagerfeld escorted Patitz for the finale.

In 2011 and now in her 40s, Patitz made industry headlines when she was chosen as the spokesmodel to front the cosmetics campaign for the global brand Shiseido. That year, Patitz was featured in Sarah Brokaw's book Fortytude, telling the author, "I believe in aging gracefully because it celebrates me as a woman...In the end – for me, as for every woman – beauty is what one emanates. It comes from feeling good about who you are with your flaws (and we all have them), and being at peace with yourself."

The following year, Vogue Paris included Patitz in a black and white portfolio with Lauren Hutton, Stephanie Seymour, and Daria Werbowy that celebrated examples of timeless elegance and beauty. Photographed by Inez and Vinoodh, the editorial was highlighted in the media by such publications as W magazine.

Numéro China featured Patitz on its cover for its February 2013 issue. The simple yet powerful headline read Woman and was accompanied by a 20-page editorial photographed by Philip Dixon. The age-defying traits of femininity, strength of character, and enterprising talent were lauded the next year in a special issue of Vogue Italia titled "Women of Today" that placed Patitz among her colleagues such as Anjelica Huston, Julia Ormond, and Karen Alexander.

In 2014, Patitz starred in an international advertising campaign with actress Jane Fonda and model Doutzen Kroes for L'Oreal Age Perfect that celebrated three generations of timeless women.

For Vogue Italia's September 2015 issue, Patitz was reunited with Peter Lindbergh for a new group editorial commissioned by editor-in-chief Franca Sozzani. Titled "In Love With..." the pictorial celebrated Lindbergh's most frequent subjects, the 1990s supermodels. As noted by writer Suzy Menkes in French Vogue, "This set of pictures ... seems more intense in the refusal to follow the tools of today's beauty trade – postproduction, a computerized smoothing, hair tidied, wrinkles removed. Refusing to bow to glossy perfection is Peter Lindbergh's trademark – the essence of the images that look into each person's unvarnished soul, however familiar or famous the sitter." A short film, titled "The Reunion", was also produced and made headlines worldwide for Lindbergh's celebration of maturing beauty. The following year, Lindbergh advanced his mission of expanding ideals of beauty and representation when he grouped Patitz with actress Andie MacDowell and models Helena Christensen, Karen Alexander, and Amber Valletta to front a campaign for cosmetics brand L'Oréal Paris, saying "It should be the responsibility of photographers today to free women and finally everyone, from the terror of youth and perfection." In an interview about the shifting norms in the advertising industry, Patitz commented, "You don't want to see the plastic-fantastic faces of some celebrities today. That's not a role model for young girls; that's not a role model for an older woman, either."

Patitz appeared on the catwalk for the last time in 2019, after being diagnosed with breast cancer. This was for Etro's fall/winter 2019 show during Milan Fashion Week. For Etro's Fall 2019/2020 collection titled "Aristoindies", Patitz appeared at the Conservatorio Giuseppe Verdi in Milan in a collection that made headlines for bringing together A-list supermodels, including Farida Khelfa and Alek Wek.

=== Assessment and recognition ===
Patitz's first show was in Paris for Azzedine Alaia in 1984, according to Elle magazine. Thereafter, Patitz appeared in many seminal fashion collections of each decade, including Helmet Lang's Fall 1994 latex and lace collection as well as Lang's March 1998 collection which was the first fashion show to ever be shown online and on the internet. As much as Patitz was associated with Azzedine Alaia and his cadre of models in the 1980s, she was also distinctly associated with Helmut Lang in the 1990s and 2000s. As one of the "Original Supermodels", she remained in demand as of 2015 on covers and in campaigns – returning to the runway for select brands and designers, such as Etro, Jean-Paul Gaultier and Chanel. and as of 2017 did not stop working.

In 2009, Vanity Fair called Patitz a catwalk queen of the 1990s. In March 2009 Vogue declared, "Hermès flies high with the return of nineties supermodel Tatjana Patitz to the runway" and in a tribute to aviator Amelia Earhart, Patitz closed the show walking the finale with designer Jean Paul Gaultier. Patitz then starred in Chanel's 2010 Resort Collection as the picture-hatted Edwardian mother in "Death in Venice", walking the finale with designer Karl Lagerfeld. Patitz was a mainstay in Lagerfeld's fashion shows including Chanel, Chloe, Fendi, as well as his own collections.

In a 2014 edition of Musee Magazine, artist Slater Bradley told editor-in-chief Andrea Blanch that Patitz's collaboration with artist Charles Ray titled "The Most Beautiful Woman in the World, 1993 (for Parkett 37)" in which the supermodel was depicted as the girl next door, had achieved what social media would do decades later - but in 1993 - and called it extraordinary and genius.

In 2020, Marie Claire magazine celebrated Patitz as one of the top supermodels who ruled the runway in the 1990s. The same year, Patitz was recognised for her work with Vogue articles such as "Who Was Tatjana Patitz, The Most Mysterious of the Original Supers?", "'True West' Is the Fashion Fix You Need After Months of Lockdown", and Harper's Bazaar's "The 21 Top Supermodels That Dominated Fashion in the '90s" that were published during the global pandemic of 2020. The year also marked the 30th anniversary of George Michael's "Freedom! '90", regarded by Spin magazine as the 15th most iconic music video of all time and by Rolling Stone as the 11th best music video of all time.

In early 2021, the Frankfurter Allgemeine Zeitung named Patitz, Claudia Schiffer, and Nadja Auermann as the only three Germans who still hold the title of supermodel.

A 2021 article in L'Officiel about the supermodel phenomenon of the 1990s singled out Patitz for having the most beautiful face of the decade.

== Acting and other appearances ==
In 1987, she appeared in the Duran Duran music video for "Skin Trade" which charted on Billboard's Hot 100. In 1988, she appeared in the Nick Kamen music video for "Tell Me". Patitz then starred in George Michael's "Freedom! '90" music video with Cindy Crawford, Christy Turlington, Linda Evangelista, and Naomi Campbell in 1990, regarded as one of the greatest videos of all time by Spin, Parade, and Billboard. In 2000, she appeared in the Korn music video for the song "Make Me Bad," a top 10 hit on Billboard's Mainstream Rock Songs chart.

Patitz appeared in international television commercials for Cartier, Revlon, Levis, DuPont Luxura, Pantene, Dockers, Ralph Lauren, and the Vauxhall Corsa commercial directed by Tarsem Singh and starring supermodels Campbell, Turlington, Evangelista, and Kate Moss.

Her first major film appearance was as a murder victim in Rising Sun (1993). Following this, Patitz had appearances on television series such as The Single Guy and The Larry Sanders Show. Her largest role was in the 1999 thriller Restraining Order.

Along with Michael J. Fox, she appeared in the 2011 Carl Zeiss AG calendar, photographed by Bryan Adams in New York City in the summer of 2010.

== Personal life ==
Patitz was married to businessman Jason Randall Johnson and in 2004, gave birth to her son, Jonah Johnson, who joined his mother on many editorial shoots including "The Great Escape" for American Vogue's August 2012 issue and "Family Matters" in the December 2019 issue.

In a 2019 interview for Mercedes-AMG's 63Magazine, Patitz stated, "My son is my source of happiness in life. My friends, my animals, and nature give me balance and satisfaction – the feeling of being connected ... I would like to send an empathetic person with a big heart out into the world. Jonah should always have the self-belief to be himself and to embody and articulate his own attitude and opinions... . Having compassion and care for everything that exists. For our planet, animals, nature, and people." Patitz shared her philosophy about growing older in the beauty, fashion and entertainment industries: "I am proud of my wrinkles. I worked for each one and they belong to me. Growing older is beautiful. You become wiser and more mature. For me, giving away or changing that gift is not an option ... Beauty means being a good person and being there for others. In my opinion, beauty is not only about looks, but everything that makes up a person."

On January 11, 2023, Patitz died of metastatic breast cancer in Santa Barbara, California, at age 56.

== Catalogue of noted works in auctions, galleries, exhibitions and museums ==
Partial List
Title	Artist	Year	Venue
Tatiana Patitz, Cafe de Flore, Paris, 1985	Peter Lindbergh	1985	Sotheby's
Tatjana in Swimsuit 3, Malibu, 1987	Herb Ritts	1987	Fahey/Klein
Estelle Lefébure, Karen Alexander, Rachel Williams, Linda Evangelista, Tatjana Patitz, Christy Turlington, Santa Monica, California, USA	Peter Lindbergh	1988	Sotheby's
Tatjana Veiled Head (Tight View), Joshua Tree 1988	Herb Ritts	1988	Christie's
Naomi Campbell, Linda Evangelista, Tatjana Patitz, Christy Turlington, Cindy Crawford, British Vogue, New York, 1989	Peter Lindbergh	1989	Christie's
Stephanie, Cindy, Christy, Tatjana, Naomi, Hollywood	Herb Ritts	1989	Christie's
The Wild Ones: Cindy Crawford, Tatjana Patitz, Helena Christensen, Linda Evangelista, Claudia Schiffer, Naomi Campbell, Karen Mulder & Stephanie Seymour', Brooklyn, for American Vogue (May 1991)	Peter Lindbergh	1991	Sotheby's
Tatjana Patitz, Paris 1992	Ellen Von Unwerth	1992	Immagis
The Most Beautiful Girl in the World (Tatjana Patitz), 1993	Charles Ray	1993	Dorotheum
Leonardo DiCaprio and Tatjana Patitz, 1990s	Helmut Newton	1990s	Artnet
Heaven, Tatjana Patitz And Cayla, Dolphins, 2000	Nomi Baumgartl	2000	Ira Stehmann
Crying Portrait of Tatjana Patitz as A Renaissance Madonna with Holy Child (After Raffaello), 2010	Francesco Vezzoli	2010	Gagosian
Tatjana Patitz for Jil Sander, 1992—printed 2016	Nick Knight	2016	Phillips

== Cited sources ==
- Barker, Nigel (2015). Models of Influence. New York, US: Harper Collins Publishers. ISBN 978-0-06-234584-4.
