= Ryan Saranich =

- Born: Ryan David Saranich; February 16, 1987 (age 39); Danbury, Connecticut, United States
- Genres: Funk, jazz, fusion
- Occupations: Musician, composer, clinician
- Instruments: Saxophone, drums, bass, piano
- Years active: 1992 onward
- Website: www.ryansaranich.com

Ryan Saranich is an American jazz fusion saxophonist. Aside from being a saxophonist, he is also a drummer, bassist, and pianist.

== Education ==
Ryan attended Northwest School of the Arts, in Charlotte, North Carolina. For higher education, Ryan attended the University of North Carolina at Wilmington and Berklee College of Music.

== Performances ==
Since 2016, Ryan has been a member of the tribute band Brit Floyd. Since joining, Ryan has performed on Saxophones, Clarinet, Keyboards, Bass, Guitars, and Percussion.

In addition, Ryan has performed soundtracks and recordings for internationally released major motion pictures and documentaries.

Ryan is an active writer and arranger, primarily in the jazz and pop settings.

== Solo recordings ==
Ryan released his first album, "Doc's Blues" on April 28, 2008 with the help of keyboardist Joseph Wooten, "The Voice" drummer Nate Morton, and Brazilian musicians Raphael Du Valle (bass) and Ronaldo Pizzi (keyboards). His second work was released December 21, 2010. It is entitled, "All By Myself" where all instruments are played by him. A third release, "Story" was released March 28, 2013 featuring many talented musicians from the Boston area, but also including French vocalist Guillaume Eyango, a frequent collaborator. A fourth release, "Foodventure", was a collaboration of Charlotte, NC musicians that released February 19th, 2016 with Ryan as a leader. "Others' Odysseys" was released on Sept 25th, 2018, with Ryan playing all instruments on the recording.

His newest release, "Exceptional Chaos" arrived on July 26th, 2024. It is a jazz-fusion recording, which pays homage to Chick Corea. On this recording, Ryan is joined by local Charlotte musicians Marcus Jones, Michael D'Angelo, and Troy Conn, Korean pianist Jamie Song, and special guests Manuel Valera from Vital Information as well as organist Harry Waters.

== Endorsements ==
Ryan plays Légère Reeds, P. Mauriat Saxophones, Theo Wanne Classic Mouthpieces, Latin Percussion, Fodera Guitars, EBS Bass Amplification, Godin and Seagull Guitars, BG Franck Bichon Accessories, Neotech Straps, Key Leaves, NBO, and Mono Cases

== Discography ==
=== As leader ===
- Doc's Blues (2008)
- All By Myself (2010)
- Story (2013)
- FoodVenture (2016)
- Others' Odysseys (2018)
- Exceptional Chaos (2024)

=== As a sideman ===
Artist	Title	Year of Release	Role	Awards and Nominations
Alex Bailey	Searching for Something	2017	Tenor Saxophone	
Analise Scarpaci	Pathetic Little Dreamer	2022	Tenor Saxophone	
Ann Adams	All the You's and Me's	2022	Tenor Saxophone	
Brit Floyd	Live USA 2020	2021	Saxophones, Percussion, Guitars, Bass, Keyboards	
Chris Heaven	Pure Chocolate	2008	Tenor Saxophone	
Danny Go!	Jazz-ma-Tazz	2023	Tenor Saxophone, Bass, Piano, Arrangement	
Edo Scordo	On the Ferry Through the North	2020	Bass	
Elin Lee	Breathing	2014	Tenor Saxophone	
Georgia English	In the Fog	2012	Tenor Saxophone	
How To Dance In Ohio	How To Dance In Ohio	2023	Drums, Bass	
Martin Musaubach	All Kinds of Good	2016	Tenor Saxophone, Co-Producer	2017 Golden Melody Award, Jazz Album of the Year
Matzka	Matzka Station	2018	Saxophone, Horn Arrangements	
Maurice Williams and the Zodiacs	Carolina's Best, Volume III	2009	Tenor Saxophone	
Monet Sable & The Charlie Rosen Big Band	Monet Sable & The Charlie Rosen Big Band	2012	Baritone Saxophone	
Randy Rainbow	A Little Brains, A Little Talent	2021	Alto, Tenor, Baritone Saxophones	2022 Grammy Nominee; Best Comedy Album
Raphael Du Valle	Cada Dia Mais	2009	Tenor Saxophone	
