= Carolyne Christie =

British aristocrat

Carolyne Anne Christie
- Born: 27 December 1946 (age 79)
- Other names: Carolyne Scully; Carolyne Waters
- Spouses: John Julian Reynolds (m. 1966; div. 1970) Rock Scully (m. 1974; div. 1975) Roger Waters (m. 1976; div. 1992)
- Children: Harry Waters; India Waters
- Relatives: Willie Christie (brother); Lawrence Dundas, 3rd Marquess of Zetland (uncle)

Carolyne Anne Christie (born 27 December 1946) is a member of the British aristocracy, known for having been married to Rock Scully, manager of the Grateful Dead, and later to Roger Waters of Pink Floyd, who wrote songs about her. Their son Harry Waters is also a musician.

== Family ==
Christie's parents were Hector Lorenzo Christie and Lady Jean Agatha Dundas. Her mother's father was Lawrence John Lumley Dundas, 2nd Marquess of Zetland and so she is niece to Lawrence Aldred Mervyn Dundas, 3rd Marquess of Zetland, and a cousin to both Mark Dundas, 4th Marquess of Zetland and Lord David Dundas. She has a brother, Willie Christie. Through Harry, she has grandchildren.

== Early marriages ==
Christie married John Julian Reynolds in 1966; however they divorced in 1970. She married Rock Scully in 1974, but they separated and divorced the following year. Scully's brother has subsequently expressed doubts about the legality of the union, which Scully misrepresented to his common-law wife as a green card marriage. Sources gave different dates for these divorces.

== Roger Waters ==
After her divorce from Scully, Christie married Roger Waters, the bassist and main song writer of the English rock band Pink Floyd; this was his second marriage. Their wedding cake was a gift from her friend, Sarah Ferguson, later Duchess of York. They had two children, Harry (born 16 November 1976), a keyboard player in his father's band as well as other groups, and India Rose (born 25 April 1978), a model, before divorcing in 1992.

The two-part song "Pigs on the Wing" on Pink Floyd's Animals album is a love song from Waters for Christie, and a hidden message in the song "Empty Spaces", on the subsequent album The Wall, refers to her. The character "The wife" in the album The Wall, and subsequent cinematic adaptation is likely intertwined with Rodger Waters marriage at that time To Carolyne as the main character of the album "Pink" largely follows Rodger's own life, And many parts of the album are used to vent Rodgers personal frustrations with the world around him. It was Christie's suggestion that Bob Ezrin be asked to produce the album.

Waters employed Christie's brother Willie to take photographs for the cover of his last album with Pink Floyd, The Final Cut, and to direct the accompanying short film.
