= Stephanie, Cindy, Christy, Tatjana, Naomi, Hollywood =

1989 photograph by Herb Ritts

Stephanie, Cindy, Christy, Tatjana, Naomi, Hollywood is a black and white photograph taken in 1989 by photographer and director Herb Ritts (American, 1952–2002). The subject of the photograph is a group of five women coyly entwined together in an embrace.

Each of the five women – Stephanie Seymour, Cindy Crawford, Christy Turlington, Tatjana Patitz and Naomi Campbell – was a noted muse, friend, and frequent subject of the photographer's fashion and fine art work. The photograph is one of the original images that ushered in the 1990s pop-cultural phenomenon of the supermodel.

As with Ritts' other notable works, the photograph functions as a fashion picture, celebrity portrait and fine art.

The photography session was originally for a May 1989 pictorial in Rolling Stone magazine "The Hot Issue", and included the byline: "Four sizzling fashion models prove clothes don't always make the woman." In that issue, Turlington was not included due to an exclusivity contract with Calvin Klein. As Turlington recalled in the book, Herb Ritts: The Golden Hour :

"There's that one image Herb did for Rolling Stone, which I wasn't a part of. When I started working for Calvin Klein, I wasn't allowed to work with anybody else, so I had a couple of years where I lived out in California, but I wasn't actually allowed to work, except with Bruce Weber. I would go and visit Herb when we were in town, and I went to his house on Hillside, to go hang out for the day, and they were doing this beautiful portrait on the deck of this guest bedroom...They said, "Oh, just for the last picture, just pop in for a second," and that's an image that I love. Herb made it into postcards...That's one thing he did early on. He started selling his images without anybody knowing. That image is really another grouping of a supermodel group. Sometimes Stephanie's in it, sometimes she's not. Tatjana is in it, sometimes she's not. And there's one that's just Stephanie, Cindy, Naomi, me and Tatjana."

As Campbell recalled for Time Magazine, "We said, 'How can you not be in this picture?' And she jumped in, and that was it!"

Crawford has suggested to the New York Times that Ritts invented the "supermodel" when he captured the photograph of the five women together.

The group image of all five women came to light in the early 1990s, thereby publicly revealing Stephanie, Cindy, Christy, Tatjana, Naomi, Hollywood for the first time and representing not only the rise of the supermodel but also the rise of Los Angeles as a fashion capital, as noted by Ritts' contemporary, photographer Matthew Rolston. In Rolston's tour through the Getty Museum for the Icons of Style exhibition, he said of Stephanie, Cindy, Christy, Tatjana, Naomi, Hollywood: "The late 1980s saw several other major changes in the literal landscape of fashion. One was a move of venue. Los Angeles, believe it or not, began to take an important place in the hierarchy of fashion capitals. The fashion media focus began to turn away from models and on to celebrities (in many ways thanks to Andy Warhol and his fetishization of fame). Celebrity was on the rise. It wasn't enough to be a beautiful but unrecognizable model anymore. By the end of the decade, in order to compete with the culture of celebrity, the models had to become celebrities themselves. Thus, the '80s supermodel was born. A particular group of models, the so-called 'supers,' seen here in an iconic image by Los Angeles-born photographer Herb Ritts from 1989 entitled Stephanie, Cindy, Christy, Tatjana, Naomi, Hollywood, marks that moment indelibly. And as the ethos of Hollywood and celebrity became primary in the worlds of fashion, beauty and luxury, Los Angeles itself began a slow rise."

In a 2007 article in Forbes magazine, it was noted that there had been no auction sales of Stephanie, Cindy, Christy, Tatjana, Naomi, Hollywood in a large-scale format and that the print had been sold out on the private market for years; furthermore, a price of $54,000 was paid for an 18 inch by 20 inch version of the image in 2006. In 2019, Christie's Auction House realized a selling price of approximately $230,000 (USD) for a similarly sized print.

The photograph has been included in the following exhibitions:

Herb Ritts: L.A. Style (April 3, 2012 to May 19, 2013)
Museum	Date of exhibition
The J. Paul Getty Museum at the Getty Center (Los Angeles)	April 3 to September 2, 2012
Cincinnati Art Museum (Cincinnati)	October 6, 2012 to January 1, 2013
The John and Mable Ringling Museum of Art (Sarasota)	February 23 to May 19, 2013

Icons of Style: A Century of Fashion Photography, 1911-2011 (June 26, 2018 to September 22, 2019)
Museum	Date of exhibition
The J. Paul Getty Museum at the Getty Center (Los Angeles)	June 26 to October 21, 2018
Museum of Fine Arts, Houston	June 23 to September 22, 2019

The famed image is regularly included in retrospectives of Ritts' works in such publications as Harper's Bazaar and Vanity Fair.
