= Verglas =

Verglas may refer to:

- Verglas, a thin coating of glaze ice on rock
- Verglas Music, a record label that has released works such as Jabberwocky, a 1999 rock album
- Antoine Verglas (born 1962), a photographer
- Petit Verglas, a novel by Riad Sattouf, a French writer and cartoonist
