= House of King Ali =

Historical landmark in Baghdad, Iraq

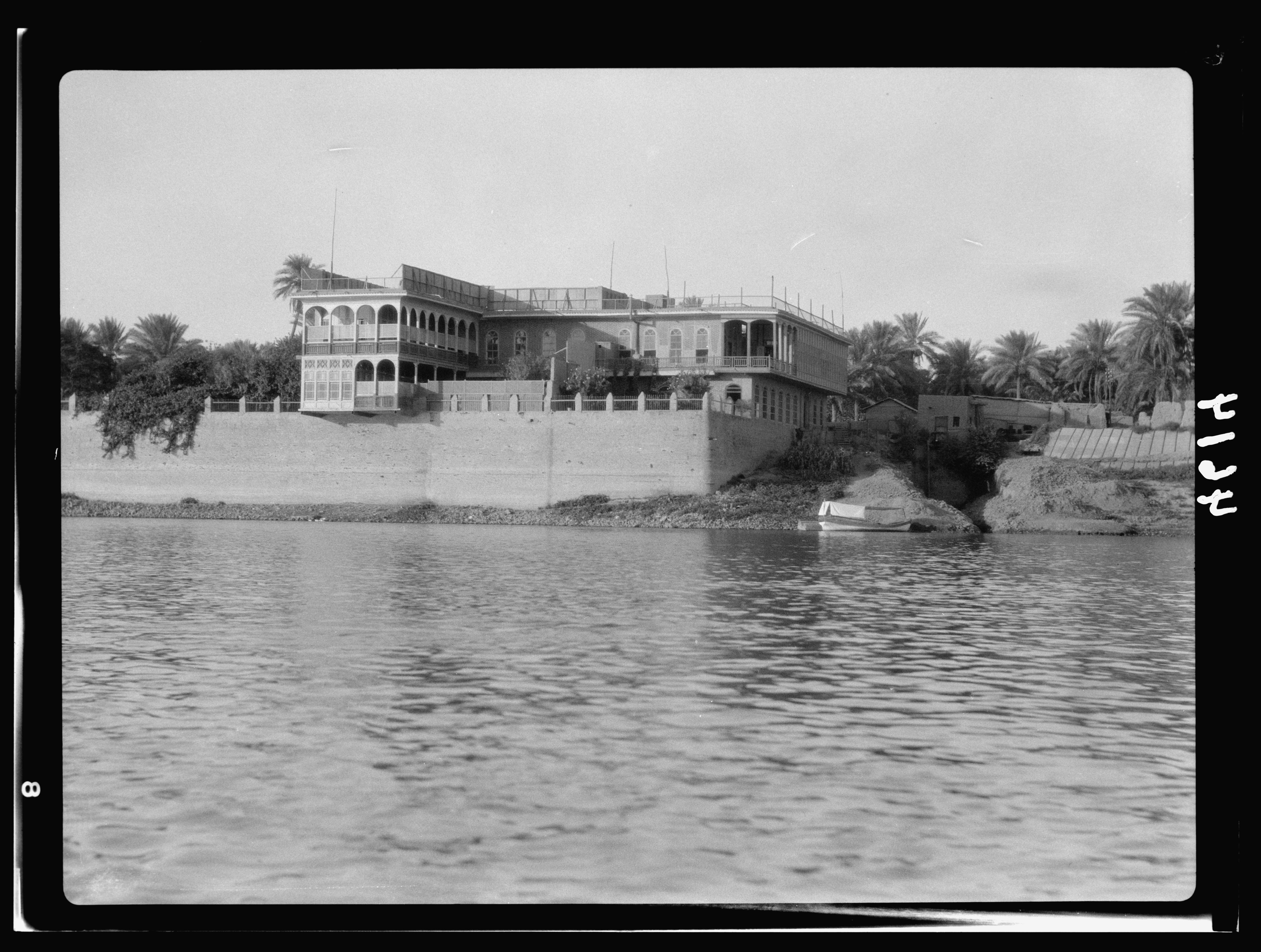
The actual house of King Ali, as photographed in 1932, the current house on the banks of the Tigris River is rumored to have been part of this complex and is also named after it.

The House of King Ali (Arabic: بيت الملك علي, romanized: Bayt al-Malik Ali) is a name given to an Ottoman-era house located on the banks of the Tigris River in Baghdad, Iraq. The house is famous in Baghdad because it was owned by the famous English author Agatha Christie during her stay in Iraq. Due to this, the house was named after "Beit Melek Ali," a house mentioned in her 1951 novel They Came to Baghdad. As well as rumors that the house was once part of King Ali of Hejaz's house when he was exiled to Baghdad in 1925. In recent years, the house has suffered from severe neglect and has sparked debates on its historicity and cultural preservation in Iraq.

== History ==
The house is said to have been part of a complex owned by King Ali after being deposed from the Kingdom of Hejaz in 1925. However, it is doubtful that this complex was ever related to the one in which Agatha Christie resided in as there are no mentions of this palace in any of her books. The more well-known name comes from Beit Melek Ali, which is a location also located on the banks of the river mentioned in the novel that Victoria Jones regularly passes by.

Agatha Christie does mention the house in Agatha Christie: An Autobiography which was published in 1977 near the end of the book:

"We had an old Turkish house on the West bank of the Tigris. It was thought a very curious taste on our part to be fond of it, and not to want one of the modern boxes, but our Turkish house was cool and delightful, with its courtyard and the palm-trees coming up to the balcony rail."

The house was an Ottoman-era house that Christie, alongside British archaeologist and academic Sir Max Mallowan, stayed in throughout the 1940s and 1950s. At the time, Iraq was considered a historical and cultural hub which many British travelers visited at the time. Since she first visited Iraq in 1928, Christie had been involved with archeology throughout Iraq and frequently stayed in this house between archaeological expeditions. During her stay, she also wrote They Came to Baghdad in this house. Palestinian writer Jabra Ibrahim Jabra also mentioned that he visited the house to meet Mallowan in his book Princesses' Street: Baghdad Memories.

=== Present day ===
The house is located next to the Jumhuriyya Bridge on the banks of the Tigris opposite the Karrada Maryam area. However, it is currently suffering from neglect and collapse. Due to the fact that its private property, the Iraqi government couldn't buy it to preserve it. As such many activists who live around the area and are part of heritage groups call for attention to it.

According to Iraqi historian Yasser al-Abidi, he claims that the house wasn't owned by Christie, but rather it was a "distortion of facts."
