= Tatjana Veiled Head (Tight View), Joshua Tree 1988 =

Tatjana, Veiled Head, Tight View, Joshua Tree, 1988
- Artist: Herb Ritts
- Year: 1988
- Medium: Photograph
- Subject: Tatjana Patitz

Tatjana, Veiled Head, Tight View, Joshua Tree, 1988 is a black and white photograph by American photographer Herb Ritts (1952–2002). A close-up framing the thinly veiled face of a woman, the image was photographed in Joshua Tree, California, in 1988.

The woman in the photograph is fashion model Tatjana Patitz (1966–2023), a subject of many of Ritts' commercial and fine art photographs. The image, in which the subject's face is veiled with black chiffon, originally served as the cover of the October 1988 issue of British Vogue with an accompanying editorial titled "Metamorphosis of the Body".

Tatjana, Veiled Head is one of the earliest and finest examples of Ritts' work bridging the world of contemporary high fashion photography and fine-art photography. It was selected as one of Ritts' 10 most iconic images by Harper's Bazaar in 2015. The image has been featured in such books as Herb Ritts L.A. Style by Paul Martineau (Getty Publications, USA, 2012) and Models of Influence by Nigel Barker (HarperCollins Publishers, USA, 2015).

It has appeared in the following exhibitions (partial list):

- Icons of Glamour and Style: The Constantiner Collection (New York, Rockefeller Plaza), December 16 to 17, 2008
- The J. Paul Getty Museum, Los Angeles, April 3 to September 2, 2012
- Herb Ritts: L.A. Style, April 3, 2012, to May 19, 2013
- Cincinnati Art Museum, October 6, 2012 to January 1, 2013
- The John and Mable Ringling Museum of Art, Sarasota, February 23 to May 19, 2013
- Museum of Fine Arts, Boston, March 4 to 8, 2015
