= Shirley Ritts =

American interior designer (1920–2008)

Shirley Ritts (October 28, 1920 – February 24, 2008) was an American interior designer whose company helped to popularize rattan furniture in the United States during the 1950s and 1960s. Ritts was the mother of photographer and music video director, Herb Ritts (August 13, 1952 – December 26, 2002).

== Early life ==
Shirley Ritts (Roos) was born in Baltimore, Maryland on October 28, 1920. Her father, Martin Roos, was an ophthalmologist and she had two sisters. Ritts was raised Jewish. She married her husband Herb Ritts, Sr. in 1950, who happened to own a furniture company at the time.

== The Ritts Company ==
The Ritts Company benefited from the popularity of rattan furniture during the post-World War II era. Herb Ritts acted as the company's furniture designer, and Shirley was in charge of sales and marketing. The couple had four children whom they raised in a 27-room, Spanish-style house in Brentwood, California. Ritts assisted with the set design on Elvis Presley's 1961 film Blue Hawaii, in which she used rattan furniture and Polynesian design. Ritts often traveled extensively once her company introduced a line of high-end Lucite furniture.

== Personal life ==
Ritts was married three times, and had five children. Her first husband was Leo Arthur Herringman (1916–1991), and they had one daughter Susan Herringman Ritts who was later adopted by Herb Ritts Sr. Her third husband was Herb Ritts Sr., and they had 4 children; Herb Ritts, Rory Ritts, Gary Ritts, and Christina Ritts. Ritts and her husband Herb divorced during the late 1970s. They remarried in the 1990s. She was also known for introducing Cindy Crawford and Richard Gere to each other. Shirley Ritts died of emphysema at her home in Brentwood, California on February 24, 2008 at the age of 87.

== Popular culture ==
In the first installment of Lethal Weapon film series, the Ritts Co. store can be seen from a rooftop where Mel Gibson's character Martin Riggs is trying to subdue a suspect.
