= Northwest School of the Arts =

American public school in North Carolina

Location
- 1415 Beatties Ford; Charlotte, North Carolina 28216; United States; 35°15′26″N 80°51′22″W

Information
- Other name: NWSA
- Type: Public
- Motto: "Northwest is simply the best"
- School district: Charlotte Mecklenburg Schools
- CEEB code: 340706
- Principal: Katy Coffelt
- Campus Director: Andrew Lawler
- Teaching staff: 62.16 (FTE)
- Grades Offered: 9–12
- Enrollment: 993 (2024-2025)
- Student to teacher ratio: 15.97
- Athletics: None
- Mascot: Dragon
- Yearbook: 80's
- Website: northwesths.cmsk12.org

Northwest School of the Arts is a high school arts magnet school in Charlotte, North Carolina. The school enrolls around 1100 students.

In order to get accepted into this school, Students must choose a major class from one of four categories. The categories are Theatre, Music, Dance, and Visual Arts. These students must display their skills to the staff who teach these majors and must be selected in order to attend the school. Northwest also prioritizes academic excellence, offering 22 AP classes and external college courses. Students are active in organizations such as Student Leadership, Diversity Club, Yearbook, Literary Magazine, and various honors societies. These students can also be seen doing things relating to their major outside of school such as acting in theatre shows, submitting their work into competitions, performing at orchestras, and so much more.

Many arts faculty are active industry professionals, such as 2015 Tony Award-winner Corey Mitchell, master artist Bryan M. Wilson, and professional dancer Amelia Binford.

== Major Classes ==
There are four categories of majors each with their own sub categories and classes.

Majors
Dance	Music	Theatre	Visual Arts
Ballet	Audio recording	Film production	2d media
Dance class	Band	History of theatre	Ceramics
Jazz dance	Choir	Improvisational	Digital art
Modern dance	Music comp	Musical theatre	Photography
	Music theory	Play production	Printmaking
	Orchestra	Play writing	Sculpture
	Recital	Repertoire	
		Stage management	
		Theatre arts	
		Tech Theatre	
		Voice dictation	

== AP Classes ==
The 22 AP classes NWSA offers are listed below. Note that some of these courses are virtual but they do provide credit upon scoring either a 3, 4, or 5 on the AP exam nonetheless.

- AP English Language and Composition
- AP English Literature and Composition
- AP Precalculus
- AP Calculus AB
- AP Calculus BC
- AP Physics 1
- AP Biology
- AP Environmental Science
- AP European History
- AP Human Geography
- AP Psychology
- AP United States History
- AP United States Government and Politics
- AP World History: Modern
- AP Computer Science Principles
- AP French Language and Culture
- AP Japanese Language and Culture
- AP Spanish Language and Culture
- AP Art History
- AP Music Theory
- AP Studio Art 2-D
- AP Studio Art 3-D
- AP Studio Art Drawing

== History ==
Northwest School of the Arts is named after "Northwest Junior High," which was renamed from West Charlotte High School in 1954. It is one of Charlotte’s first and only all-black junior high schools. The school currently occupies the original historical West Charlotte High School campus, with the original 1938 building's facade and interior intact.

In the early twentieth century, Charlotte suburbs began to expand but remained segregated under Jim Crow laws. As the Black middle-class expanded and Johnson C. Smith University grew, White real estate developers Walter S. Alexander, John M. Scott, and A.M. McDonald bought farmland along Beatties Ford Road under Freehold Realty Company in June 1912 and created Washington Heights in 1913, a planned community with no race restriction on owning property. By June 1913, 43 lots had been sold and the expansion continued until the WWI economic depression in 1919.

During this time, Washington Heights high school students (considered grades 7 to 12) had to travel to Second Ward High School, the city's only high school for Black students. To solve the issue, West Charlotte High School, present-day Northwest School of the Arts' campus, was built in 1938 by the city on Thaddeus "Thad" L. Tate's old farm, a Black civic leader and prominent business man.

In 1954, West Charlotte High School moved further down Beatties Ford, expanding into a new building in the University Park neighborhood, and its original building remained active under the new name Northwest Junior High. After the Supreme Court’s 1971 landmark ruling Swann vs. Charlotte-Mecklenburg Board of Education, West Charlotte High School was integrated. Charlotte-Mecklenburg became a national symbol of major school desegregation and cross-town busing policies in the United States.

During the 1970s, parts of Washington Heights was demolished for Brookshire Freeway (I-277). Land originally set aside for a park sold for redevelopment. In Second Ward between 1960 and 1967, the city office developments demolished 1,480 homes, displacing 1,007 predominantly Black families.

The Washington Heights neighborhood is a vibrant historical Black community, but segregation policies and historical displacement constantly deteriorate the neighborhood. However, Northwest School of the Arts began in the1993-94 school year under the guidance of Charlotte-Mecklenburg School superintendent Dr. John Murphy and arts educator Dr. Charles LaBorde, with the mission to revitalize the area's failing school system. The school's popularity grew quickly expanding from middle school into high school, and the first high school class graduated in 1997, with only 25 students.

Northwest School of the Arts now remains one of the top-ranked and most diverse schools in the district.

== Notable alumni ==
- Tre' Booker, former NFL cheerleader and dancer in the off-Broadway production Bull Durham
- Ashlei Sharpe Chestnut, actress and writer who made her Broadway Debut in the Tony nominated revival of Arthur Miller's The Crucible, and was in the company of the Tony nominated play A Doll's House, Part 2 on Broadway. She also has starred in several Primetime Television shows, a few of her credits include: Homeland, Rap Shit, Gotham, and Cruel Summer
- Abby Howard, creator of Junior Scientist Power Hour and The Last Halloween
- Eva Noblezada, two time Tony Award nominee and actress who starred as Eurydice in the Broadway musical Hadestown from 2018 to August 2023, and has previously starred as the lead Kim, in Miss Saigon on West End
- Reneé Rapp, singer-songwriter and actress who played Regina George in the Broadway musical Mean Girls and movie adaptation Mean Girls (2024) and was the winner of Best Performance by an Actress at the 2018 Jimmy Awards
- Ryan Saranich, jazz fusion saxophonist
- Prettifun, rapper and producer
