= Olive Snell =

English artist

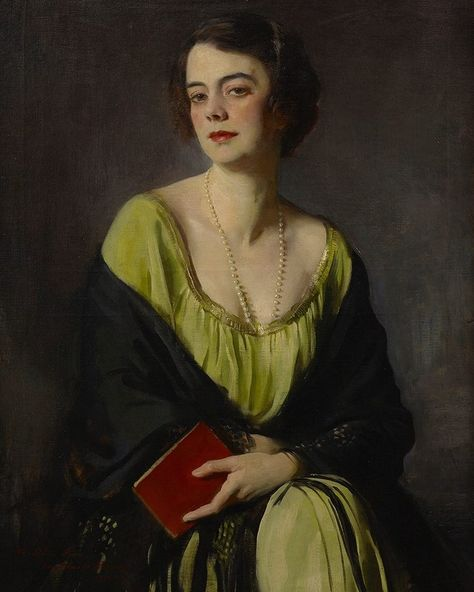
- Olive Snell by Oswald Birley
- Born: Olive Constance Snell; 3 April 1888; Durban
- Died: 23 May 1962 (aged 74)
- Occupation: Painter
- Spouse(s): Ebenezer John Lecky Pike
- Children: 4

Olive Constance Snell (3 April 1888 – 23 May 1962) was an English artist, known for her portraiture.

Snell was born in the Colony of Natal, South Africa, the daughter of Constance Louisa and Edward Snell of Monkokehampton, Devon, England. She arrived in England in 1912, already a competent painter.

In the 1920s, she painted portraits for the front covers of several issues of The Sketch, and The Bystander, working mainly in crayon & watercolour. During this period, she made two visits to the United States, making use of introductions made by Sir Joseph Duveen at the behest of Oswald Birley. Her subjects included American celebrities such as Tallulah Bankhead and Amelia Earhart, and their British equivalents, such as Madeleine Carroll and Cathleen Nesbitt. Her portrait of Agatha Christie was used on the cover of Agatha Christie: An Autobiography. She also painted Mrs. Walter Rosen (Lucie Bigelow Dodge), and other sitters.

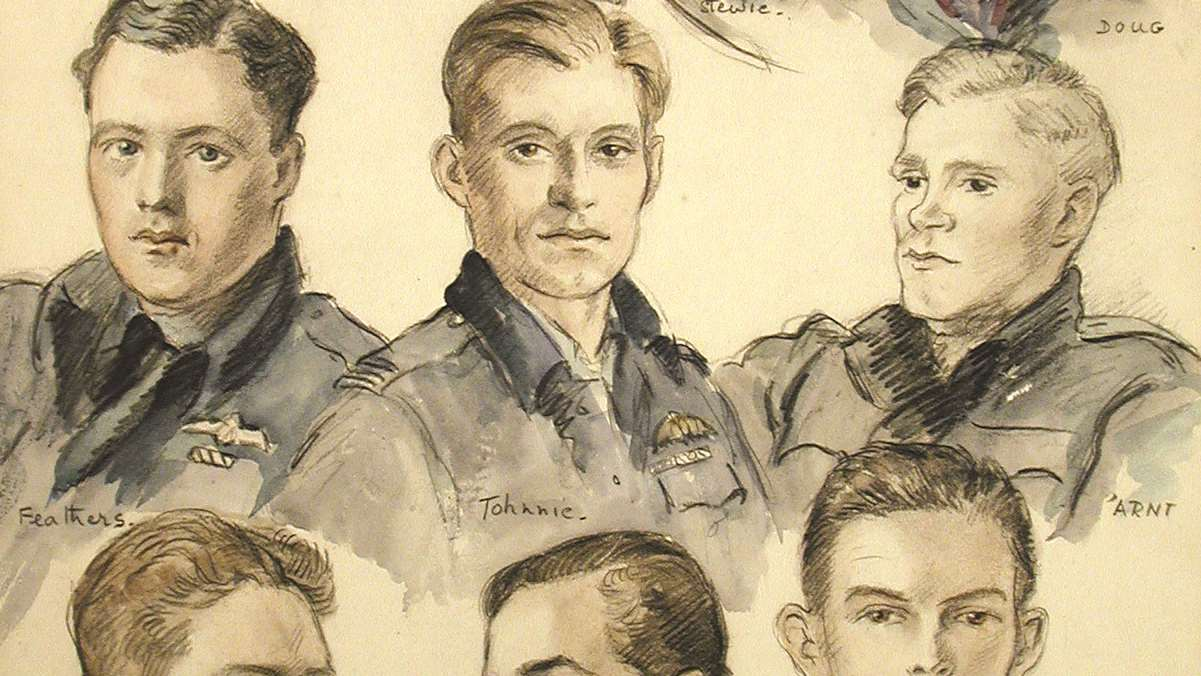
Watercolours of pilots by Olive Snell

During World War II, she turned to military subjects, including Battle of Britain pilots, as an unofficial war artist attached to the Royal Air Force. Her 1943 painting of pilots of 610 Squadron at RAF Westhampnett is now in the Goodwood collection on the same site. Four of the eighteen pilots depicted were killed within months of its completion. The War Artists' Advisory Committee issued her with a permit to sketch in public during wartime.

She married Ebenezer John Lecky Pike, CBE, MC (1884–1965), an officer (later a colonel) in the Grenadier Guards, on 16 April 1913. They had four children, the youngest of whom, David Ebenezer (born 9 June 1925), a lieutenant in the Grenadier Guards, was killed in action on 5 March 1945 and is buried at Reichswald Forest War Cemetery. Their eldest child, Helena Christian, married Lionel Brett, 4th Viscount Esher. The middle daughter Katherine Mary Penelope married Lawrence Dundas, 3rd Marquess of Zetland. A third daughter, Jane Rosemary (1923–1934), died in childhood.

She exhibited at the Fine Art Society, Grosvenor Gallery, New English Art Club, Royal Institute of Oil Painters and the Society of Women Artists. Her works are in public collections, including the Imperial War Museums and Royal Air Force Museum.

Her portrait was painted in 1922 by Oswald Birley. As of 2017, the picture was in private ownership. Birley subsequently painted Ebenezer Pike, and later married Pike's sister, Rhoda, after painting her also. Another portrait was painted circa 1927 by Augustus John. This work was sold by Boningtons in June 2018. The Illustrated London News noted in 1927, that Snell "was lucky enough to have some lessons from that celebrated artist Augustus John, who was interested in her work".
