= Roberta Freeman =

American singer

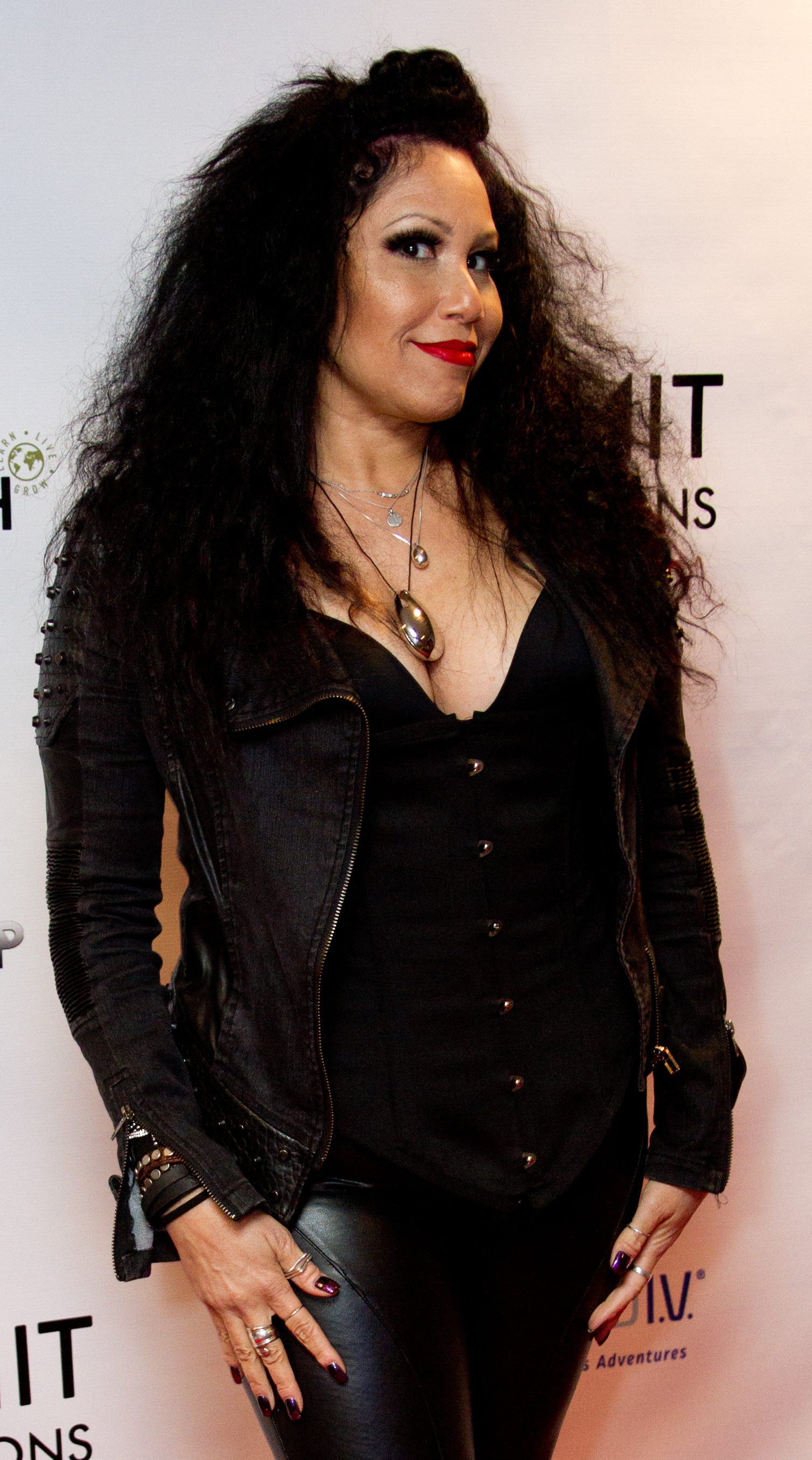

Background information
- Origin: New York City, U.S.
- Genres: Rock; Blues; R&B
- Occupation: Singer
- Website: robertafreeman.com

Roberta Freeman is an American singer, best known for her work with Guns N' Roses, Pink Floyd, Cinderella, Engelbert Humperdinck, and Mary Wilson's Supremes. According to Rolling Stone, "Freeman was one of six women brought into the madness of GN’R for their marathon ‘Use Your Illusion’ tour." Fellow female musicians include Tracey Amos, Cece Worrall, Lisa Maxwell, Anne King and Diane Jones.

"All were brought on board in the early stages of the Use Your Illusion tour in the summer of 1991, and they stuck around until it wrapped up two years later. As touring members... they played a huge role in shaping the band’s sound during their commercial peak."

== Vocal work ==
In 2022, Freeman performed with Jon Batiste on We Are, which won a Grammy Award for Album of the Year during the 63rd Annual Grammy Awards. In 2021, Freeman released a cover of Pink Floyd's "Wish You Were Here", which featured Classless Act's Derek Day, Guns N' Roses', Teddy Andreadis, Jane's Addiction's Stephen Perkins, and Gwen Stefani's Derek Frank. The accompanying music video was filmed at the Teragram Ballroom in Los Angeles, California, and shot by award-winning cinematographer Michael Franks. Freeman performed at the 2022, 90th Annual Hollywood Christmas Parade supporting Marine Toys for Tots with The Jet Velocity Holiday All Star Band led by Jason Ebs (Peter Criss) and Janea Chadwick Ebs (Joe Cocker), featuring Teddy Andreadis, Glen Sobel (Alice Cooper), Britt Lightning (Vixen), Mitch Perry (Cher and Edgar Winter), and Adam Kury (Candlebox).

Freeman serves as vocal director, arranger, and choreographer with Scott Page's all-star celebrity rockstar Pink Floyd Tribute Band, Think:EXP featuring Stephen Perkins, Norwood Fisher (Fishbone), Kenny Olson (Kid Rock), Derek Day, Tony Franklin (The Firm), Kitten Kuroi (Elvis Costello), Melonie Taylor (Bette Midler), and Carol Hatchett, and The Voice's Will Champlin.

== Personal life ==
A native of New York City, Freeman spent her early childhood in Brooklyn, then later moved to Co-op City with her family. She was the second of two girls born to African-American father, James Freeman, and Russian-Jewish mother, Gertrude. Her sister is the children's book illustrator, Laura Freeman.

== Associated acts ==
- Annabella Lwin
- Bee Gees
- Bernard Fowler
- Black Veil Brides
- Cinderella
- Engelbert Humperdinck
- Enrique Bunbury
- Foxy Shazam
- Freda Payne
- Gavin Christopher
- Gin Wigmore
- Gilby Clarke
- Guns N' Roses
- Hanni El Khatib
- Jerry Harrison
- Joe Cocker
- John Mellencamp
- Johnny Kemp
- Mark Collie
- Mary Wilson
- Nick Waterhouse
- Pink Floyd
  - Brit Floyd
- The Pretty Reckless
- RDGLDGRN
- Secondhand Serenade
- Stevie Salas
- Sugaray Rayford
- Weezer

== Live performances ==
=== Think:EXP (2018 - ) ===
- "Great Gig IN The Sky" - Live at The LA WisDome (2019)
- "Great Gig IN The Sky" - Live at The LA WisDome (2019)
- "Great Gig IN The Sky" - Live at The LA WisDome (04/19)
- "Great Gig IN The Sky" - Live at The LA WisDome (12/18)
- "Money" (1/31/20)

=== Nick Waterhouse (2014 - ) ===
- "Holly" - Promo (Full Length LP)
- Morning Becomes Eclectic - Live on KCRW
- "Wreck the Rod" - Official Video ft. Danny Trejo

=== Weezer (2019) ===
- The Black Album - Crush Music/Atlantic Records
- "Can't Knock the Hustle" - Weezerpedia album credit
- "Can't Knock the Hustle" - Official music video

=== Annabella Lwin's Bow Wow Wow (2019) ===
- "I Want Candy" - Live in LA (5/25/19)

=== Sugaray Rayford (2019) ===
- "Somebody Save Me" - Forty Below Records
- "You and I"/"Somebody Save Me"/"Is it Just Me"/"Dark Night of the Soul"

=== Nasty Housewives (2017–2018) ===
- “45 Shades Of Blue”
- “Alternative Facts” (Lead Vox: Roberta Freeman)
- “Legend Of Narcissus”
- “Overrated”
- “Not My President”
- “Massacre At Bowling Green”
- “Mar- A- Lago”

=== Brit Floyd (2014–2018) ===
- Official band website
- “Great Gig In The Sky” (01/2015)

=== The Pretty Reckless (2017) ===
- Performance on Conan -TBS (2/28/17)

=== Engelbert Humperdinck (2011–2012) ===
==== (International) Released Tour ====
- "Quando, Quando, Quando" - Tel Aviv 1/12/11
- Concert Review - Manilla
