= Brit Floyd =

British tribute band to Pink Floyd

- Origin: Liverpool, England
- Genres: Progressive rock, psychedelic rock
- Years active: 2011–present
- Members: Damian Darlington; Ian Cattell; Rob Stringer; Arran Ahmun; Jamie Humphries; Randy Cooke; Jessie Lee Houllieru; Shannon Robinson; Gareth Darlington; Bryan Kolupski
- Past members: Amy Smith; Jay Davidson; Rosalee O'Connell; Carl Brunsdon; Ryan Saranich; Ola Bienkowska; Emily Jollands; Angela Cervantes; Edo Scordo; Thomas Ashbrook; Genevieve Little; Roberta Freeman; Bobby Harrison; Robyn Cage; Chess Galea; Matt Riddle; Eva Avila
- Website: www.britfloyd.com

Brit Floyd is a Pink Floyd tribute band formed in 2011 in Liverpool, England, by Damian Darlington.

== History ==
Brit Floyd originated in 2011 on the initiative of guitarist and singer Damian Darlington "simply because he felt he could do it one better" than his previous band, The Australian Pink Floyd Show. He continued: "There is much more attention to details in every aspect of the show, from the music to the visuals to the lighting. Everything is that much more perfected and there's a passion coming off that stage ... It's a coherent, emotional journey through Pink Floyd's catalog."

Darlington began following Pink Floyd's work after hearing The Wall at the age of 13 and he saw the band live for the first time in 1988 during the A Momentary Lapse of Reason Tour. "Since then, he has seen the band in 1994 and in different incarnations, after its split, including its 2005 reunion."

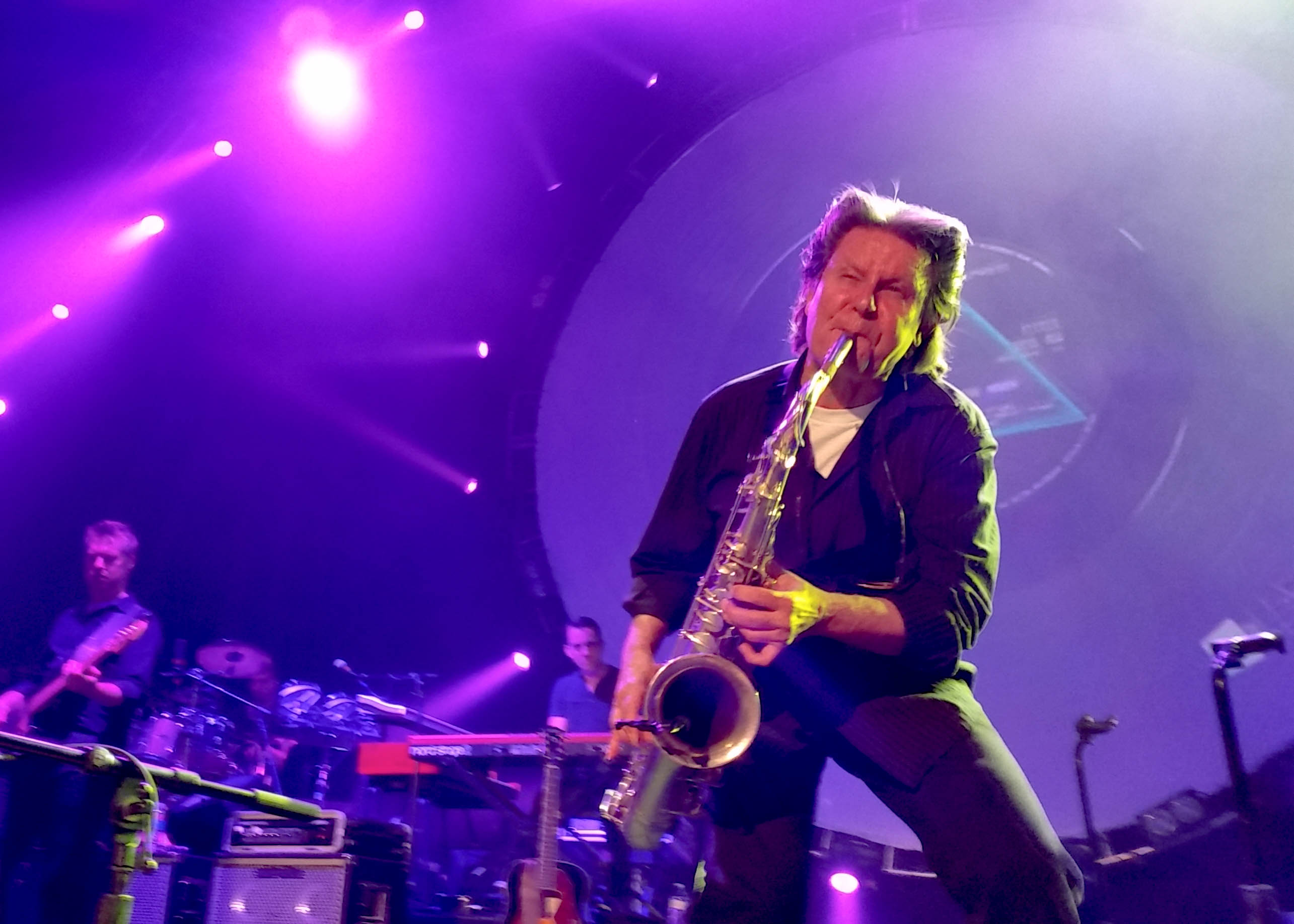
Pink Floyd saxophonist and rhythm guitar player Scott Page, during a surprise guest performance with Brit Floyd in 2015.

Regarding his growing up listening to the band, Darlington stated: "I definitely listened to Pink Floyd. I remember 'Another Brick in the Wall' being No. 1 in the UK. It was December 1979. Probably my first memory of Pink Floyd. Then I actually heard The Wall album in its entirety and that's what particularly drew me to Pink Floyd about the age of 12 or 13. I was fascinated by the record that told a story, and all these sound effects linking songs together, and also the wonderful guitar work. I was already learning to play guitar and I wanted to learn to play some of these wonderful guitar solos. That was my introduction to Pink Floyd. I was a fan from quite an early age."

After playing in a number of bands over the years covering a wide range of music including country, western, and even jazz, Darlington played with The Australian Pink Floyd Show from 1994 to 2011 (Darlington is not the only veteran of The Australian Pink Floyd Show in Brit Floyd, "several others in Brit Floyd" have been a part of the band as well). Darlington wanted to parlay his experience with The Australian Pink Floyd Show into something more nuanced: "I felt it was time to do it in a different way with a different group of musicians — to strike out on my own, I've had a lot of experience and have learned how to do this correctly." Darlington says the show pays greater attention to detail, presenting a more polished show: "If you've seen the Australian show, you'll notice a difference in a big way — a difference for the better, we make the extra effort to re-create as much as we can and it's not just the songs: It's the visuals, as well."

The Band has toured extensively since 2011 and has featured guest musicians from Pink Floyd's studio and touring band line-ups. Pink Floyd bass player and vocalist Guy Pratt joined Brit Floyd on stage at Echo Arena Liverpool on 9 November 2013, and saxophonist and rhythm guitarist Scott Page joined them at Los Angeles's Orpheum Theatre on 17 June 2015, playing "Money" and "Us and Them" with the band.

In 2016 the band embarked on "a massive 76-date US tour" featuring "an extended career-spanning setlist" that included a performance of Pink Floyd's 24-minute epic "Echoes" and featured a "million dollar stage design". At the conclusion of their 2022 world tour, a press release announced that Brit Floyd had parted ways with their longtime management (a small British production company called CMP Entertainment) and partnered with Palladium Entertainment. Due to the split, the band made new social media profiles along with a brand new website. With the announcement of the management change, the band also confirmed their plans for a 2023 world tour celebrating the 50th anniversary of Pink Floyd's 1973 album, The Dark Side of The Moon.

In 2024, the band embarked on an international tour, P·U·L·S·E, celebrating 30 years of The Division Bell. The tour includes shows in the United States, Latvia, Norway, Sweden, Denmark, Germany, Italy, Switzerland, Belgium, The Netherlands and England. With special appearances by Durga McBroom, Scott Page, Harry Waters and P. J. Olsson. The Pulse tour was a commercial and public success, leading the band to record one of the shows performed during the tour.

In 2026, the band announced the first dates of their latest tour of North America. Titled "Brit Floyd – The Moon, The Wall and Beyond," it will honor the albums The Dark Side of the Moon and The Wall. There are more than 50 dates currently scheduled.

== Band ==
Various musicians have played in Brit Floyd since its inception in 2011. The present band members and key crew members are:

- Damian Darlington – guitarist, lapsteel, vocalist, and musical director (2011–present)
- Ian Cattell – vocals, bass (2011–present)
- Arran Ahmun – drums, percussion (2011–present)
- Rob Stringer - Keyboards, Hammond B3, Vocals (2011 - present)
- Randy Cooke – drums, percussion (2021–present)
- Rhiannon Dewey - Saxophones, percussion, keyboards, guitar, bass
- Jesse Lee Houllier – backing vocals (2022–present)
- Shannon Fayth – backing vocals (2025–present)
- Angela Cervantes - backing vocals (2014 - 2016, present)
- Hannah El Ayadi - backing vocals (2025 - present)
- Lilian Ximenes - backing vocals (2016, present)
- Liza Melfi - backing vocals (2025 - present)
- Gareth Darlington – Sound Designer and Front of House Engineer (2011–present)
- Bryan Kolupski – Media Director – Animation and Video (2011–present)

Past members

- Amy Smith – backing vocals (2011)
- Rosalee O'Connell – backing vocals (2013)
- Carl Brunsdon – saxophone, percussion, guitar, bass guitar (2011–2015)
- Bobby Harrison – guitar, vocals (2011–2015)
- Ola Bienkowska – backing vocals (2011–2022)
- Emily Jollands – backing vocals (2011–2016)
- Jacquie Williams – backing vocals (2011–2022)
- Angela Cervantes – backing vocals (2013–2017)
- Thomas Ashbrook – keyboards, vocals (2013–2017)
- Roberta Freeman – backing vocals (2013–2017)
- Karl Penny – drums (2014–2019)
- Andy Robbins - bass, acoustic guitars (2015)
- Jay Davidson – saxophones, guitars, percussion, keyboards (2015–2018)
- Jenn Kee – backing vocals (2016–2019)
- Ella Chi – backing vocals (2018–2020)
- Chess Galea – backing vocals (2023–2024)
- Edo Scordo – guitars, vocals (2015–2025)
- Matt Riddle – keyboards, synths, Hammond, vocals (2017–2025)
- Ryan Saranich – saxophone, percussion, guitars, bass, keyboards (2016–2025)
- Eva Avila – backing vocals (2017–2025)
- Genevieve Little – backing vocals (2021–2025)
- Robyn Cage – backing vocals (2024–2025)
