= Rock Scully =

American music manager (1941–2014)

Rock Robert Scully (August 1, 1941 – December 16, 2014) was an American music manager, best known as one of the managers of the rock band the Grateful Dead from 1965 to 1985.

Living in Haight-Ashbury as a graduate student prior to the Summer of Love, Scully first saw the Grateful Dead play at one of Ken Kesey's Acid Tests, and signed on as the band's manager almost immediately. He started to book the band at local venues, like the Fillmore Auditorium and the Avalon Ballroom, where other bands such as Jefferson Airplane, Big Brother and the Holding Company, and Quicksilver Messenger Service got their start. Within a few years, the Dead became more successful, and Scully helped negotiate their initial contract with Warner Bros. Records. He also got them booked into larger concerts (including the Monterey Pop Festival and Woodstock) and was one of the principal organizers of the Altamont Free Concert.

Although he developed an opiate addiction alongside several others in the Grateful Dead's social network in the late 1970s, Scully was employed by the group in various capacities (including stints as director of advance, road manager and publicist) until 1984, when he was fired by the group, in part for enabling Jerry Garcia's cocaine and heroin addictions. For several years, he also served as manager of the Jerry Garcia Band and Garcia's housemate. Alleged embezzlement from the Garcia Band played a role in the group's decision to fire him. Following rehabilitation, he returned briefly in 1985.

Scully was the author of a 1995 memoir, Living with the Dead: Twenty Years on the Bus with Garcia and the Grateful Dead (written with David Dalton).

== Personal life ==
Rock Scully was born on August 1, 1941, in Seattle, Washington. His stepfather was journalist and academic Milton Mayer. Due to Mayer's multifarious career, Scully was raised in Carmel, California (where he cultivated a close friendship with future politician Sam Farr) and various locales in Europe. He finished his secondary education at a Swiss boarding school, where he acquired a passion for skiing, a lifelong avocation.

After studying psychology at the University of Vienna, Scully graduated with a degree in history and literature from Earlham College in 1963. Although he provisionally accepted an administrative post with Farr's father (a member of the California State Senate), Scully refused to remit the required loyalty oath and was unable to assume his duties. Beginning in the fall of 1963, he completed graduate work in history at San Francisco State University, where he coordinated student dances.

Following a month-long jail sentence for participating in a civil rights demonstration in 1965, Scully determined that aiding the incipient 1960s counterculture would provide "musical relief" to the civil rights movement. He dropped out of graduate school to manage The Charlatans and worked with other groups as a member of Chet Helms's Family Dog collective before joining the Grateful Dead's organization.

Although they never legally married, Scully was in a relationship with Kemetic priestess Nicki Scully from 1969 to 1984; they had a daughter, Sage. He also raised her daughter from a previous relationship (Acacia, also known as Spirit) and fathered a son (Luke) in a previous relationship. Luke died in the 2004 Indian Ocean earthquake and tsunami while vacationing in Thailand. During the Grateful Dead's 1974 European tour, he engaged in a brief liaison with and may have married Lady Carolyne Christie, the niece of Lawrence Dundas, 3rd Marquess of Zetland. Scully's brother has subsequently expressed doubts about the legality of the union, which Scully misrepresented to his common-law wife as a green card marriage. Christie later married Roger Waters of Pink Floyd.

Following his separation from the Grateful Dead, Scully worked as a concert promoter near Lake Tahoe before moving to Louisville, Kentucky, where he operated an automotive paint shop for three years with his longtime companion, former Grateful Dead associate Amy Moore. Shortly after relapsing, he broke up with Moore and returned to California in 1992 where he attempted to reclaim his old position but found his job "had been usurped by others." Nevertheless, he remained on amicable terms with the group, as evidenced by a 2010 group interview with Scully, Phil Lesh and Bob Weir.

Scully died of lung cancer at age 73 on December 16, 2014, in Monterey, California. He spent his final years in Monterey serving as caregiver to his ailing mother following the death of his second wife, Frankie, while also participating in local civic life after regaining his sobriety. In a series of tweets, Grateful Dead lyricist John Perry Barlow eulogized his friend, culminating in the following observation: "Though occasionally fraudulent, you were always the real thing." He was remembered by the Rolling Stone as the "manager of the Grateful Dead from their early Haight-Ashbury days up until 1985."
