= Herb Ritts =

American photographer

- Born: Herbert Ritts Jr. August 13, 1952; Los Angeles, California, U.S.
- Died: December 26, 2002 (aged 50); Los Angeles, California, U.S.
- Education: Bard College
- Occupations: Photographer, music video director
- Awards: GLAAD Media Awards; Pioneer Award 2008

Herbert Ritts Jr. (August 13, 1952 – December 26, 2002) was an American fashion photographer and music video director known for his photographs of celebrities, models, and other cultural figures throughout the 1980s and 1990s. His work concentrated on black and white photography and portraits, often in the style of classical Greek sculpture, which emphasized the human shape.

== Early life and education ==
Ritts was born on August 13, 1952, in Brentwood, Los Angeles. His father, Herb Ritts Sr. (née Rittigstein), was a furniture designer and his mother, Shirley Ritts (née Roos), was an interior designer. Together, their furniture business helped to popularize rattan furniture in the 1950s and 1960s. Raised in an affluent Jewish family, he and his three younger siblings lived next door to actor Steve McQueen, whom he considered to be "like a second father".

At his bar mitzvah, his father gave him a Kodak Brownie camera. He attended Palisades High School and moved to upstate New York in 1972 to study at Bard College, where he received a degree in economics with a minor in art history. Upon graduation in 1975, he moved back to California to work as a sales representative in the family business.

"I’m glad I didn’t go to school for photography. Other photographers I know, Helmut Newton and Bruce Weber didn’t either. Even Steven Meisel didn’t, really—he went to fashion school. For me, the most important thing I learned was just honing my eye. [...] I was tutoring myself, I suppose. Many people who excel are self-taught".

Ritts bought his first camera in 1976, a 35mm Miranda DX-3.

== Career ==
Later, while living in Los Angeles, he became interested in photography when he and friend Richard Gere, then an aspiring actor, decided to shoot some photographs in front of an old Buick. The picture gained Ritts some coverage and he began to be more serious about photography. He photographed Brooke Shields for the cover of the October 12, 1981 edition of Elle and he photographed Olivia Newton-John for her Physical album in 1981. Five years later he replicated that cover pose with Madonna for her 1986 release True Blue. That year he photographed Tina Turner for the album Break Every Rule.

During the 1980s and 1990s, Ritts photographed celebrities in various locales throughout California. Some of his subjects during this time included musical artists. He also took fashion and nude photographs of models Naomi Campbell, Stephanie Seymour, Tatjana Patitz, Christy Turlington, and Cindy Crawford, including "Tatjana, Veiled Head, Tight View, Joshua Tree, 1988." Ritts' work with them ushered in the 1990s era of the supermodel and was consecrated by one of his most celebrated images, "Stephanie, Cindy, Christy, Tatjana, Naomi, Hollywood, 1989" taken for Rolling Stone.

He also worked for Interview, Esquire, Mademoiselle, Glamour, GQ, Newsweek, Harper's Bazaar, Rolling Stone, Time, Vogue, Allure, Vanity Fair, Details, and Elle. Ritts took publicity portraits for Batman, Batman Forever, and Batman & Robin which appeared on magazine covers and merchandise throughout the 1990s. He published books on photography for various fashion designers.

From 1996 to 1997 Ritts' work was displayed at the Boston Museum of Fine Arts in Boston, attracting more than 250,000 people to the exhibit, and in 2003 a solo exhibition was held at the Daimaru Museum, in Kyoto, Japan.

== Personal life ==
Ritts was openly gay. He was in a relationship with entertainment lawyer Erik Hyman from 1996 until his death in 2002. His parents were accepting and supportive of his sexuality. Ritts was HIV-positive. He was diagnosed in 1989, and used alternative herbal treatments to fight his condition. He never publicly disclosed his diagnosis.

== Death ==
On December 26, 2002, Ritts died in Los Angeles from pneumonia at the age of 50. According to Ritts' publicist, "Herb was HIV-positive, but this particular pneumonia was not PCP (Pneumocystis pneumonia), a common opportunistic infection of AIDS. But at the end of the day, his immune system was compromised."

== Music videos ==
Year	Title	Artist	Notes
1989	"Cherish"	Madonna	
1990	"Love Will Never Do (Without You)"	Janet Jackson	with Antonio Sabàto, Jr. and Djimon Hounsou
1991	"Wicked Game"	Chris Isaak	second version of music video; with Helena Christensen
1991	"Way of the World"	Tina Turner	two slightly different versions, one for the American market and the other European
1992	"In the Closet"	Michael Jackson	with Naomi Campbell
1994	"Please Come Home for Christmas"	Jon Bon Jovi	with Cindy Crawford
1996	"Let It Flow"	Toni Braxton	
1998	"My All"	Mariah Carey	
1999	"Baby Did a Bad Bad Thing"	Chris Isaak	Remix version, with Laetitia Casta
2000	"Telling Stories"	Tracy Chapman	
2001	"Don't Let Me Be the Last to Know"	Britney Spears	
2001	"Ain't It Funny"	Jennifer Lopez	
2001	"Gone"	NSYNC	
2002	"Underneath Your Clothes"	Shakira	

== Publications ==
- Pictures, Twin Palms, 1988
- Men/Women, Twin Palms, 1989
- Duo, Twin Palms, 1991
- Notorious, Little, Brown and Company/Bulfinch, 1992
- Africa, Little, Brown and Company/Bulfinch, 1994
- Work, Little, Brown and Company/Bulfinch, 1996
- Herb Ritts, Fondation Cartier pour l'Art Contemporain, 1999
- Herb Ritts L.A. Style, Getty, 2012

== Exhibitions ==
- Herb Ritts: The Rock Portraits, Chrysler Museum of Art, Norfolk, VA, 2016.
- Herb Ritts: The Rock Portraits, Rock and Roll Hall of Fame, Cleveland, OH, 2015/16
- Herb Ritts, Museum of Fine Arts, Boston, MA, 2015
- Herb Ritts: Super, Hamilton's Gallery, London, 2016/17
- Herb Ritts: Super II, Hamilton's Gallery, London, 2017
