= Harry Waters =

British piano and Hammond organ player (born 1976)

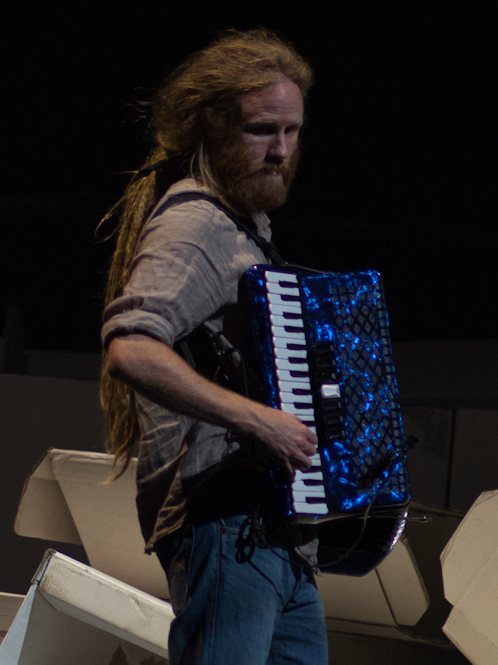
- Waters performing with Roger Waters in 2012

Background information
- Born: 16 November 1976 (age 49)
- Genres: Jazz; progressive rock
- Instruments: Keyboards; Hammond organ; piano; guitar
- Years active: 2002–present
- Website: harrywaters.com

Harry William Waters (born 16 November 1976), sometimes known as Hal Waters, is a British piano and Hammond organ player, associated with progressive rock and jazz.

== Life ==
Waters is the son of songwriter and lyricist Roger Waters, who co-founded the rock band Pink Floyd, and his second wife Carolyne Christie, the niece of the 3rd Marquess of Zetland.

He is married to visual artist Richelle Rich. They reside in Los Angeles.

== Musical career ==
A two year old Harry Waters is heard in the original recording of "Goodbye Blue Sky" on Pink Floyd's 1979 album The Wall. The song opens with him saying "Look, mummy, there's an aeroplane up in the sky". Harry and India Waters are credited as "children in the garden" in the liner notes of Roger Waters' 1987 solo album Radio KAOS

Waters joined his father's touring band in 2002, replacing keyboardist Jon Carin on the In the Flesh tour; he later playing alongside Carin since The Dark Side of the Moon Live in 2006. Harry was fired from the band (alongside several other band members) by his father shortly before Christmas 2016.

In 2004, he toured with Marianne Faithfull and Ozric Tentacles. He is a fan of Phish and The Grateful Dead and has played in several jam band cover bands.

Waters is also a jazz musician who has teamed with the likes of Ian Ritchie (saxophone player for Roger Waters), forming the Harry Waters Quartet. Some demos of his jazz work are available to download from Waters' official website. In November 2008, the first Harry Waters Band album was released.

On 19 June 2011, Waters played a Pink Floyd song "In the Flesh" (from The Wall) with Primus during the band's concert at the Effenaar in Eindhoven.

On 17 September 2015, Dean Ween announced on his Facebook page that Harry Waters was the new keyboard player of his namesake group, the Dean Ween Band.

He is a member of the band McNally Waters with singer-songwriter Larry John McNally. He has scored for TV and film.

In 2022, Waters joined Israeli Pink Floyd tribute band Echoes to perform The Wall alongside other former members of his father's touring band. In 2023, he joined Colonel Les Claypool's Fearless Flying Frog Brigade on their "Summer of Green" touring, playing Pink Floyd's 1977 album Animals each night. Later in the year, he agreed to perform three shows with English tribute band Brit Floyd.

== Discography ==
=== Albums ===
- Harry Waters Band (2008)
- McNally Waters (2018)
- Bang Bang (2021)

=== Film scores ===
- More Human Than Human
- The Birth of the Cobra
- The Halcyon
- The Look
- Proxy
- Retrospekt

=== TV Work ===
- Comedians in Cars Getting Coffee
- Baywatch
- At Home with Amy Sedaris
- Stage Mother
- Lose a Stone in 21 Days
- Chelsea
- The Beauty Inside
- The Way Home
- Himalaya with Michael Palin

=== Video games ===
- Pirate Pop - dadako

=== Harry Waters Band ===
The lineup is as follows:

- Harry Waters: Piano
- Yarron Stavi: Bass
- Seb Rochford: Drums
- Roger Beaujolais: Vibraphone
- Ian Ritchie: Tenor Saxophone
- Alan Barnes: Alto/Baritone Saxophone, Clarinet
- Quentin Collins: Trumpet
