= Agatha Christie: An Autobiography =

1977 book of recollections of Agatha Christie

An Autobiography by Agatha Christie
- Dust-jacket illustration of the first UK edition
- Author: Agatha Christie
- Cover artist: Olive Snell
- Language: English
- Genre: Autobiography
- Publisher: Collins
- Publication date: November 1977
- Publication place: United Kingdom
- Media type: Print (hardback & paperback)
- Pages: 544 pp (first edition, hardback)
- ISBN: 0-00-216012-9
- OCLC: 3473421
- Dewey Decimal: 823/.9/12 B
- LC Class: PR6005.H66 Z512 1977b
- Preceded by: Sleeping Murder
- Followed by: Miss Marple's Final Cases and Two Other Stories

An Autobiography is the title of the recollections of crime writer Agatha Christie published posthumously by Collins in the UK and by Dodd, Mead & Company in the US in November 1977, almost two years after the writer's death in January 1976. The UK edition retailed at £7.95 and the US edition at $15.00. It is by some considerable margin the longest of her works, the UK first edition running to 544 pages. It was translated and published in Greek, Italian, Polish, Portuguese, Hungarian, German and Spanish.

== Overview ==
She wrote this allegedly from 2 April 1950 - 11 October 1965 meaning it took her 15 years. Christie provides a foreword and an epilogue to the book in which she very clearly states the beginning and end of the composition. The book was supposedly started on 2 April 1950 at the expedition house at Nimrud where she was working on the excavation of that ancient city with her second husband, the archaeologist Max Mallowan. The narrative was then completed on 11 October 1965 at one of the Mallowans' homes, Winterbrook House in Wallingford, Berkshire where Christie's death occurred eleven years later. Collins included a preface to the book in which they admitted that repetitions and inconsistencies had been "tidied up", but they continued to impress on readers that the text had been composed over a fifteen-year period and was then left untouched by Christie for the remainder of her life. Christie's official biography revealed that the truth was more complicated and while many notes and short diaries had been made between 1950 and 1965, Christie's intention had been for a more ad hoc series of smaller books in the style of the 1946 publication Come Tell Me How You Live (which concentrated fully on her life on one of her husband's digs and the personalities and events involved). In the early 1960s Christie was being approached more and more often for permission to write biographies of her, all such requests being firmly turned down. In February 1962 she informed her literary agent, Edmund Cork of Hughes Massie, that she did not want any account of her life written, but exactly three years later she seemed to recognise the inevitability of such works being composed and, determined to undercut such efforts, started work in earnest to bring her notes into a more cohesive narrative, although she remained determined that publication would not occur during her lifetime. The writing was finished by the end of 1966 with the draft being sent to Cork for his suggestions and a request for a copy to be typed for Christie's daughter Rosalind Hicks in order that she could offer her opinions.

After Christie's death in 1976, the text was edited by Philip Ziegler of Collins in conjunction with Rosalind and her husband, Anthony. There is no record of Christie herself making any further alterations to the text in her lifetime. In the 1965 epilogue she stated that, "now that I have reached the age of seventy-five, it seems the right moment to stop…I live now on borrowed time, waiting in the ante-room for the summons that will inevitably come…I am ready now to accept death." Consequently, there is no mention of her later works, the award of the DBE in 1971 or successes such as the 1974 film of Murder on the Orient Express. She also admitted that she didn't follow a strict chronological and detailed order of the events of her life, instead wanting to "plunge my hand into a lucky dip and come up with a handful of assorted memories". The published work does mostly follow a chronological order (although how much of that is due to the work carried out in 1976–77 is not known); however, the book is by no means comprehensive. Upon publication there was an expectation that an explanation would be offered of her famous 1926 disappearance but none is forthcoming. The publisher's preface anticipates any disappointment felt when they admit to this omission on the first page but state, "the references elsewhere to an earlier attack on amnesia give the clue to the true course of events."

Christie was enamoured all her life with the happiness of her childhood and her loving relationship with her mother and this is reflected in the text of An Autobiography. Within the 544 pages, the first appearance of her first husband, Archie Christie, does not take place until page 212 (as opposed to page 57 out of 394 in her official biography) and the death of Christie's mother in April 1926 (an event which triggered the events of that calamitous year in her life and which happened in her thirty-fifth year), does not occur until page 346. Christie deals sympathetically with her first husband, relating details of the initial happiness of their courtship and married life and devoting an entire chapter to the events of their round the world trip between 20 January to 1 December 1922. Christie tells of the events of 1926 with the death of her mother, her slow breakdown, her husband's adultery and the end of her marriage in just seven pages admitting when she begins the passage that, "The next year of my life is one I hate recalling" and concluding, "So, after illness, came sorrow, despair, and heartbreak. There is no need to dwell on it. I stood out for a year, hoping he (Archie) would change. But he did not. So ended my first married life." In contrast, Christie's official biography devotes three entire chapters out of twenty-six to the events of that year.

Christie confines the events of 1945 to 1965 to just twenty-three pages. Most of her works are mentioned in passing but no great detail is given of any of them apart from the ones that are firm milestones in her career (e.g. The Mysterious Affair at Styles, The Murder of Roger Ackroyd, The Mousetrap). Her concentration is on her love of travel and the people in her life. By not writing at length about some of her works she caused some annoyance or disappointment, such as that described by Hubert Gregg, the director of six of her plays who, in his 1980 memoir Agatha Christie and All That Mousetrap, spoke with some disparagement of Christie, stating at one point, "She owed an enormous debt to Peter Saunders yet in her autobiography she gives him scant mention. Speaking of The Unexpected Guest (which Gregg directed) she says quite simply that she wrote it. I think perhaps she didn't like to confess – to herself, even – that her theatrical accomplishments could not be achieved without help." However, Janet Morgan, Christie's official biographer, considered the Autobiography to be "an enchanting book, fluent, pungent, clear-eyed about the times and circumstances in which she lived, funny about herself and other people".

The first edition contains four pages of colour plates of oil paintings of Christie and her family from the late 19th and early 20th century which do not appear in later editions.

== Publication history ==
- 1977, William Collins and Sons (London), November 1977, Hardcover, 544 pp ISBN 0-00-216012-9
- 1977, Dodd, Mead and Company (New York), Hardcover, 529 pp, ISBN 0-396-07516-9
- 1977, Scherz (Bern, Munich, Vienna), named "Meine gute alte Zeit" (My good old times) and translated into German by Hans Erik Hausner. Paperback, 539 pp., ISBN 3-502-51515-8
- 1978, Fontana Books (Imprint of HarperCollins), Paperback, 576 pp
- 1978, Editorial Molino (Barcelona). The book was published Hardcover named "Autobiografía" and translated to Spanish by Diorki. 564 pp ISBN 84-272-1801-X
- 1978, Ballantine Books, Paperback, ISBN 0-345-27646-9
- 1978, Ulverscroft Large-print Edition, (2 volumes) Hardcover, 611 pp (Volume 1) and 535 (Volume 2), ISBN 0-7089-0255-3 (Both volumes)
- 2002, Lyhnari (Greece), named "Η Αυτοβιογραφία μου" (My autobiography) and translated into Greek by Hilda Papadimitriou. Paperback, 528 pp ISBN 960-517-258-5
- 1993, HarperCollins (London), Paperback, 559 pp, ISBN 9780006353287
- 2003, Arnoldo Mondadori Editore (Italy), named "La mia vita" and translated to Italian by Maria Giulia Castagnone. 560 pp., ISBN 8804522259
- 2008, Partvonal (Hungary) named "Életem" (My Life) and translated to Hungarian by Tibor Kállai. 652 pp. ISBN 9789639644953 and the 2nd ed. Helikon (Hungary) 2021, 692 pp. ISBN 9789634796091
