= Lawrence Dundas, 3rd Marquess of Zetland =

British tennis player (1908–1989)

Lawrence Aldred Mervyn Dundas, 3rd Marquess of Zetland (12 November 1908 – 5 October 1989), was a British hereditary peer, known before 1961 as the Earl of Ronaldshay. He was also a lawn tennis player of some note in the 1940s.

== Early life and education ==
Lord Zetland was born in 1908, the elder son of Lawrence Dundas, 2nd Marquess of Zetland, and his wife Cicely Archdale. Like his father and grandfather before him, he was educated at Harrow School and Trinity College, Cambridge. He succeeded to the marquessate and other titles upon the death of his father in 1961.

== Later life ==
Zetland competed at the All England Championships, Wimbledon. He was chairman of Catterick Bridge Racecourse and Redcar Racecourse for many years. He lived at Aske Hall, near Richmond, North Yorkshire. He had been chosen as the Conservative candidate for the seat of Bath had an election been held in 1939/1940.

== Marriage and children ==
On 2 December 1936, Zetland married Katherine Mary Penelope Pike, daughter of Colonel Ebenezer John Lecky Pike and his wife, the artist Olive Snell. They had four children:

1. Lawrence Mark Dundas, 4th Marquess of Zetland (28 December 1937 – 24 January 2026)
2. Lady Serena Jane Dundas (10 September 1940 – 22 November 2012), married Captain Nigel Ion Charles Kettlewell.
3. Lord David Paul Nicholas Dundas (born 2 June 1945) married, firstly, on 17 December 1971 to Corinna Maeve Wolfe Scott and secondly on 21 November 1997 to Taina Bettina Breuckmann.
4. Lord Richard Bruce Dundas (born 6 January 1951), married firstly on 15 June 1974 to Jane Melanie Wright, secondly on 9 April 1983 to Sophie Caroline Lascelles, and thirdly on 30 June 1995 to Ruth Anne Kennedy.

Lord Zetland's niece, Carolyne Christie, was married to Rock Scully, manager of The Grateful Dead, and later, in 1976, to Roger Waters of Pink Floyd. His nephew, Carolyne's younger brother Willie Christie, is a photographer and film director.

== Death ==
Lord Zetland died in 1989 at the age of 80 and was succeeded in the marquessate and other titles by his eldest son, Mark.

== Arms ==
Coat of arms of Lawrence Dundas, 3rd Marquess of Zetland
Coronet A Coronet of a Marquess Crest A Lion's Head affrontée struggling through an Oak Bush all proper fructed Or crowned with an Antique Crown of the last Escutcheon Argent a Lion rampant within a Double Tressure flory counter-flory all within a Bordure Azure Supporters On either side a Lion proper crowned with an Antique Crown Or and gorged with a Chaplet of Oak leaves Vert fructed Gold with a Shield pendent from each, the dexter being charged with Argent a Saltire and Chief Gules on a Canton of the field a Lion rampant Azure for Bruce, and the sinister being charged with lozengy Argent and Gules for Fitzwilliam Motto Essayez (Try)

Peerage of the United Kingdom
Preceded by Lawrence Dundas	Marquess of Zetland; 1961–1989	Succeeded by Mark Dundas
