= Antoine Verglas =

American photographer (born 1962)

- Born: 1962 (age 63–64); Paris, France
- Occupation: Photographer
- Known for: Documentary-style fashion photography
- Website: antoineverglas.com

Antoine Verglas (born in Paris, 1962) is a New York City-based photographer who obtained popular acclaim for his uninhibited documentary-style fashion photographs of 1990s supermodels such as Claudia Schiffer and Stephanie Seymour.

== Early life ==
Antoine Verglas was born and raised in Paris, France, where he attended E.S.C School of Business and, on occasion, worked as a model for television commercials. Through this, he got his start hosting a TV show called Cinq sur Cinq [Five on Five] for teenagers, presenting video clips, movie trailers and interviewing celebrities, including Sharon Stone among many others. Verglas started taking photographs of his college girlfriend, Ford model Catherine Ahnell and in 1990 moved to New York City to become a photographer.

== Career ==
Over the years, Verglas went on to have successful career in commercial photography creating images for Victoria's Secret, Revlon and Maybelline, among many others, as well as magazines such as Vogue, Elle, Maxim, Sports Illustrated, GQ and Playboy. On the art scene, one of Verglas's photographs broke records at Philipps De Pury auction in London, selling for 15,000 GBP in 2015. Verglas spends his time between St. Barth, Paris, Montauk and New York City.

Along with Christiane Celle, Verglas was a co-founder of Calypso St. Barth, a Caribbean-accented multi-brand retailer with more than 35 stores, including stores in Manhattan, the Hamptons, Paris, St. Tropez and St. Barth. In 2007, Calypso Christiane Celle and Antoine Verglas sold majority interest in the company to Solera Capital LLC, a private equity investment firm. Verglas is now invested in concept store Clic and Hudson studios. As of December 2013, Mindy Meads is CEO of Calypso St. Barth. In the 1990s, Verglas introduced a new style of fashion photography when he captured models Tatjana Patitz, Stephanie Seymour, Claudia Schiffer and Cindy Crawford in a series of intimate, documentary-style photographs that ran in several international editions of Elle magazine. Prior to that, fashion editorials were highly poised. Verglas's photographs were more candid and uninhibited, with natural light. This intimate style of capturing a personality has become known as the "Verglas Signature". It is highly sought after to this day by all the top fashion magazines such as Elle, Vogue, GQ, Esquire, Maxim, and Sports Illustrated.

== Epstein Files ==
Verglas has publicly appeared in the Epstein Files after the February 2026 release of documents, with numerous emails after Epstein's 2008 arrest with correspondence as late as 2017, including forwarding an email regarding the drug scopolamine, various exchanges of photos and discussing nude photo shoots for Epstein, and asking Epstein for help advising his son Julien in a career in finance. Verglas would deny any wrongdoing and state that “strictly professional in nature.”
