= Grace Coddington =

Welsh former model and creative director (born 1941)

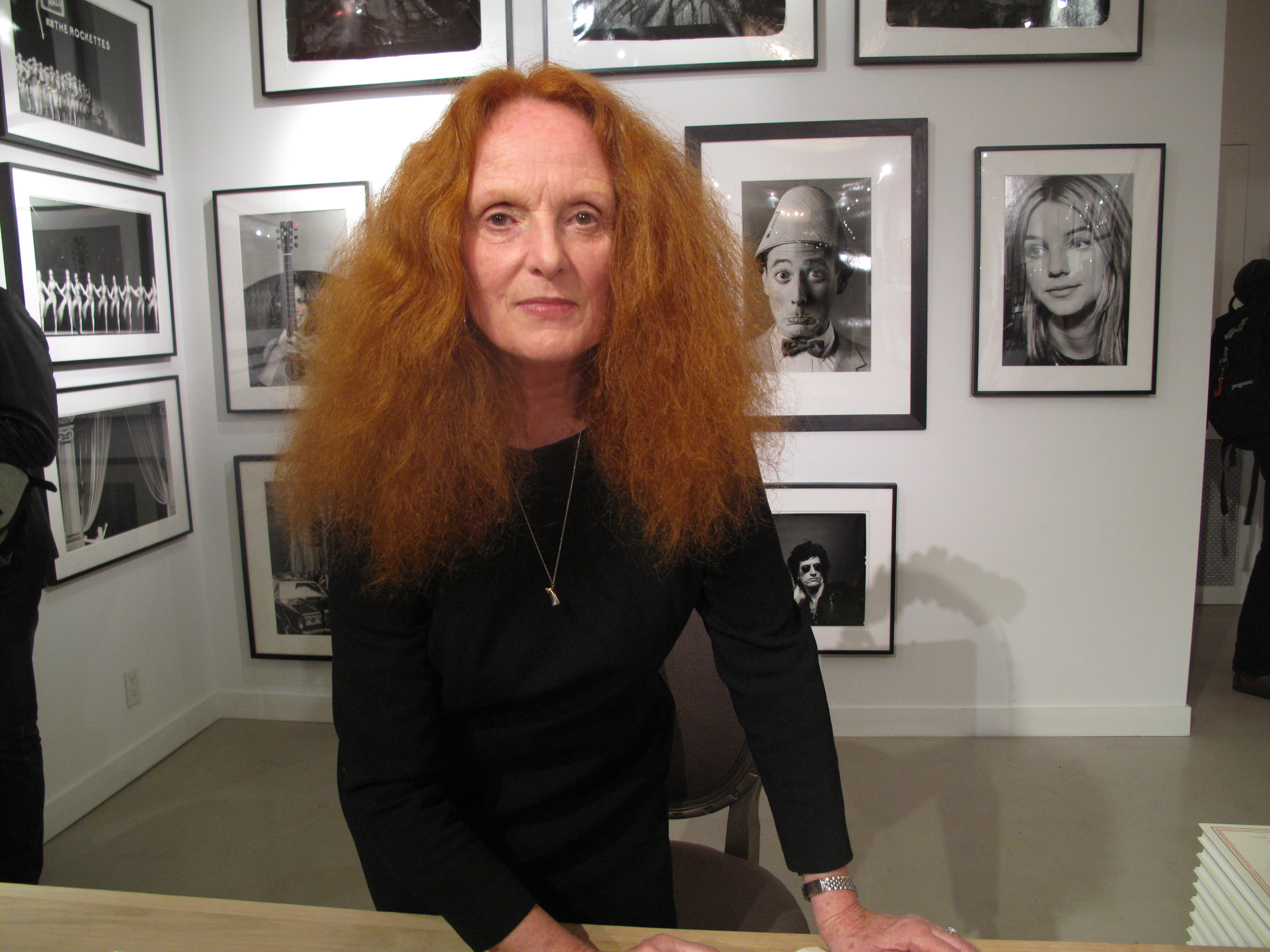
- Born: Pamela Rosalind Grace Coddington; 20 April 1941 (age 85); Anglesey, Wales
- Occupations: Stylist; fashion editor; photographer
- Title: Creative Director for US Vogue
- Spouses: Michael Chow (m. 1968; div. 1969) Willie Christie (m. 1976; div. 1980)
- Partner: Didier Malige (1986–present)
- Website: GraceCoddington.com

Pamela Rosalind Grace Coddington (born 20 April 1941) is a Welsh former model and former creative director at-large of American Vogue magazine. Coddington is known for the creation of large, complex and dramatic photoshoots. A Guardian profile wrote that she "has produced some of fashion's most memorable imagery. Her pictures might be jolly and decadent or moody and mysterious."

== Early life ==
Coddington was born on the island of Anglesey in Wales, to hotelier parents. Her interest in fashion began in her teens, when she would anxiously await the arrival of a current issue of Vogue magazine, which was at least three months outdated because she needed to order it on "rush-copy". Coddington lived many miles away from any designer shops, so Vogue was her only connection to the fashion world. She says that she loves "the whole sort of chic thing ("Italianate culture") [about Vogue] that was so entirely out of context compared to the lifestyle that [she] led." As a teen, she was pale-skinned, convent-educated and never went anywhere on her holidays, so she just looked at Vogue.

== Career ==
=== Modeling ===
In 1959 at the age of 18, there was a Vogue model competition, and someone submitted her pictures. She ended up winning the Young Model section and was featured in the October issue in a photograph by Norman Parkinson. She then began her modelling career for Vogue.

In 1967 at the age of 26, she was in a car accident that left her with head injuries and a removed eyelid, which was later reconstructed through plastic surgery. She was seven months pregnant at the time, but lost the baby the day after the accident. Coddington stated in her autobiography that this was the only time she had been able to conceive. She characterized the incident as one of the most traumatic of her life.

=== Editor ===
In 1969 at the age of 28, she was interviewed by British Vogue's Editor Beatrix Miller, and was employed as a Junior Editor. After 19 years as Photo Editor with British Vogue, in 1988, she moved to New York City to work for Calvin Klein.

In July 1988 at the age of 47, she joined Anna Wintour at American Vogue, where she worked as the magazine's creative director.

In January 2016 at the age of 75, Coddington announced that she would be exiting her role as creative director at Vogue to pursue other projects. It was announced on 9 May 2016 that Coddington would be working with Tiffany & Co.

Later that year, Coddington's new campaign for Tiffany & Co. A/W 16, featuring Elle Fanning launched. The campaign was sparse of product shots and traditional models. With direction from Coddington, Tiffany opted instead to feature celebrities and close up imagery of the jewelry styled on the body.

In 2018, Coddington also partnered with Louis Vuitton on a capsule collection, featuring many designs incorporating her cats.

== The September Issue ==
Coddington came into the public eye in 2009 with the release of The September Issue, a fly-on-the-wall documentary about the making of the September 2007 issue of Vogue. She plays a prominent role in the film as she is heavily involved in the styling and production of the issue. Her often-tense relationship with editor Anna Wintour is also highlighted.

== Popular culture ==
In the season 3 of the anthology series American Horror Story, American actress Frances Conroy plays the character of Myrtle Snow, an eccentric witch. The character's red hair, as well as her passion for fashion, are considered as a tribute to the ex-model Grace Coddington.

== Personal life ==
Coddington was married in 1968 to Michael Chow, a restaurateur. They divorced a year later. She later married the photographer Willie Christie. They divorced in 1980.

She raised her nephew, after the death of her sister Rosemary.

In 1986, she moved to New York City to work for Calvin Klein. She has since then lived with her partner, hair stylist Didier Malige, and several cats.

In 2010, she announced plans to write a memoir with her collaborator Jay Fielden. The two had previously worked together on the 2002 photo book, Grace: Thirty Years of Fashion at Vogue. The book was reissued by Phaidon in 2015. After Fielden took a job as the editor of Town & Country, Coddington had to postpone writing the book until 2011, after she decided to write it with Michael Roberts. The book deal is reported to have been worth $US1.2 million. Her memoir, Grace, was published in November 2012. In 2015, film production company A24 optioned the rights to Coddington's memoir.

== Works and publications ==
- Coddington, Grace (art direction and photo editing); Roberts, Michael (art direction and photo editing) (2002). Felden, Jay (ed.). Grace: Thirty Years of Fashion at Vogue. Paris: Edition 7L. ISBN 978-0-714-87059-5. OCLC 863491683. – first volume of collected work
- Wintour, Anna (introduction by); Talley, André Leon (essay by); Galliano, John (essay by); Blahnik, Manolo (essay by); Roberts, Michael; Mangerson, Sarah (art direction by) (2005). Coddington, Grace (ed.). The Snippy World of New Yorker Fashion Artist Michael Roberts. Paris: Edition 7L. ISBN 978-3-865-21151-4. OCLC 62735193.
- Coddington, Grace (drawings & dialogue); Malige, Didier (photographs) (2006). The Catwalk Cats. Paris: Edition 7L. ISBN 978-3-865-21344-0. OCLC 85892968.
- Coddington, Grace; Roberts, Michael (with) (2012). Grace: A Memoir. New York: Random House. ISBN 978-0-307-36276-6. OCLC 820839600.
- Coddington, Grace (foreword by); Gordon, Michael (foreword by); Gordon, Heather (supplementary writing and editing by) (2012). Vidal Sassoon: How One Man Changed the World with a Pair of Scissors. New York: Rizzoli. ISBN 978-0-847-83859-2. OCLC 783165292.
- Muir, Robin (text by); Coddington, Grace (foreword by) (2012). Donovan, Diana; Hillman, David (eds.). Terence Donovan Fashion. London: Art/Books. ISBN 978-1-908-97002-2. OCLC 805020848.
- Coddington, Grace (2014). "The Lipizzaner". In Armstrong-Jones Snowdon, Antony (Earl of) (ed.). Snowdon: A Life in View. New York: Rizzoli. ISBN 978-0-847-84328-2. OCLC 884743826.
- Coddington, Grace (art direction and photo editing); Roberts, Michael (art direction and photo editing) (2016). Grace: The American Vogue Years. London: Phaidon Press Limited. ISBN 978-0-714-87197-4. OCLC 949911080. – second and final volume of collected work
- Frankel, Susannah; Jones, Stephen (with); Coddington, Grace (foreword by) (2016). Stephen Jones: Souvenirs. New York: Rizzoli. ISBN 978-0-847-84879-9. OCLC 940933243.
- Coddington, Grace (art direction and photo editing); Roberts, Michael (art direction and photo editing) (2016). Saving Grace: My Fashion Archive 1968-2016. London/New York: Phaidon Press Limited. ISBN 978-0-714-87371-8. OCLC 978709796. – combined volumes one and two of collected work
- Roberts, Michael; Coddington, Grace (foreword by) (2017). GingerNutz: Memoir of a Model Orangutan. New York: Distributed Art Publishers. ISBN 978-0-998-70180-6. OCLC 1063480497.
- Roberts, Michael; Coddington, Grace (foreword by) (2018). GingerNutz Takes Paris: An Orangutan Conquers Fashion. New York: Distributed Art Publishers. ISBN 978-0-998-70183-7. OCLC 1042076917.
