= Lidia Brito =

Mozambiquan forestry expert and engineer

- Born: Mozambique
- Education: Eduardo Mondlane University, Colorado State University
- Engineering career
- Institutions: Eduardo Mondlane University, Colorado State University

Lidia Arthur Brito (born 13 March 1961) is a Mozambiquan forestry expert and engineer. She was the first Minister of Higher Education, Science and Technology of Mozambique. Arthur Brito is an international civil servant since 2009 and was appointed UNESCO Assistant Director General for Natural Sciences in November 2023..

== Bibliography ==
Lidia Arthur Brito is a Mozambiquan forestry expert and engineer and university lecturer, researcher and consultant for Eduardo Mondlane University. Born in Cabo Delgado, Mozambique, Dr Brito has over three decades of professional experience in Science Policy, STI development plans, monitoring and assessment of STI policies and instruments, forestry, traditional energy (Biomass and Charcoal), Higher Education management, Technical-Vocational Education, ICT for Development, as a university professor, researcher, consultant, and senior management at national, regional, and international institutions blending academic and practical experience to advance sustainable development.

Brito holds an undergraduate degree in Forest Engineering by Eduardo Mondlane University (Mozambique) and received M.Sc. and Ph.D. degrees in Forest Sciences from Colorado State University (USA). She served as the first Minister of Higher Education, Science and Technology of Mozambique (2000–2005) and was Deputy Vice-Chancellor of Eduardo Mondlane University (1998–2000). Brito has served as Advisor of the Mayor of Maputo for Strategic Planning and External Relations in the capital of Maputo (2005–2008) . Internationally, she is a recognized academic promoting sustainable development, and community–based management in Africa in general. Brito is the director of science policy and capacity building at UNESCO and a co-chairman of the conference, titled Planet Under Pressure.

She is also an active participant and speaker in many international summits and conferences.

== UNESCO career ==
Joining UNESCO in November 2009, she became the Director for Science Policy and Sustainable Development at the Natural Science Sector in Paris, then she was designated as the UNESCO Regional Director for Sciences in the Latin America and Caribbean region (UNESCO Montevideo Office) in 2014. Over the period of 2018 to 2021, she helmed the organizing committee for the Open Science Forum for Latin America and the Caribbean (CILAC), a crucial regional platform that facilitates discussions and interactions aimed at fostering sustainable policies across the fields of science, technology, and innovation. Brito assumed office as UNESCO Regional Director for Southern Africa based in Harare in 2022.. At UNESCO, Brito leads global programmes across biosphere reserves, hydrology, earth sciences, science policy, and basic sciences, guiding the organization’s work on sustainability, climate resilience, and science capacity worldwide.

Lidia Arthur Brito was appointed UNESCO Assistant Director General for Natural Sciences in November 2023.
