= Didier Malige =

French hairstylist

Didier Malige (born September 5, 1948) is a French hairstylist. Raised in Paris, France, Malige has been called a hair visionary by The New York Times and other commentators.

== Biography ==
Malige's career began in the mid-1960s when, as a teenager, he joined Carita Paris's premier salon as an apprentice. He went on to work at the salon of former Carita stylist, Jean Louis David, who made him part of a small group of young hairdressers for magazine work. Malige worked with photographers Helmut Newton, who he credits for his first big break on a French Vogue assignment; Bob Richardson; and Guy Bourdin. In the 1970s, Malige set off to launch his career in New York where he first worked with Bruce Weber for Seventeen magazine, Mademoiselle, and GQ.

Over the decades Malige has become known for his collaborations with photographers, including Patrick Demarchelier, Arthur Elgort, Hans Feurer, Annie Leibovitz, Mario Testino, Mario Sorrenti, Craig McDean, Mert Alas & Marcus Piggott, Inez van Lamsweerde & Vinoodh Matadin, David Sims, and Terry Richardson. In addition, he has collaborated with fashion houses including Dior, Dior Homme, Helmut Lang, Jil Sander, Raf Simons, Hedi Slimane, and Ralph Lauren.

Some of the fashion brands who have worked with Malige for their runway presentations and advertising campaigns include Proenza Schouler, Giorgio Armani, Dior Homme, Prabal Gurung, Philosophy, Band of Outsiders, Rachel Zoe, Prada, Miu Miu, Yves Saint Laurent, Louis Vuitton, Bottega Veneta, Bulgari, Calvin Klein, Ermenegildo Zegna, Giorgio Armani, and Net-a-Porter. Malige's work has appeared in fashion magazines including American, English, and Italian Vogue, W Magazine, Harper's Bazaar, Allure, Vanity Fair, Self Service, i-D, and Interview (magazine).

His relationship with the Frederic Fekkai brand has spanned over two decades.

== Personal ==
Malige has been living with his partner, Grace Coddington, former creative director of US Vogue, and their collection of cats for over 25 years. In 2006, they released a book The Catwalk Cats for which Malige took photographs of their home and cats and Coddington wrote and illustrated how she perceived the cats' personalities to be.

Didier Malige is currently represented by Art Partner.
