= Mark Dundas, 4th Marquess of Zetland =

British peer (1937–2026)

The Most Honourable The Marquess of Zetland DL

Member of the House of Lords
- Lord Temporal
- as a hereditary peer 5 October 1989 – 11 November 1999
- Preceded by: The 3rd Marquess of Zetland
- Succeeded by: Seat abolished (Note: Under the House of Lords Act 1999.)

Personal details
- Born: Lawrence Mark Dundas; 28 December 1937
- Died: 24 January 2026 (aged 88)
- Party: Conservative
- Relations: David Dundas (brother)

Lawrence Mark Dundas, 4th Marquess of Zetland, DL (28 December 1937 – 24 January 2026), informally known as Mark Zetland, was a British hereditary peer, known before 1989 as Earl of Ronaldshay. He was a member of the House of Lords from 1989 to 1999.

== Early life and education ==
Lord Zetland was the eldest son of Lawrence Dundas, 3rd Marquess of Zetland, and Penelope Pike. He was educated at Harrow School, where he was deputy head boy to Robin Butler and 12th man for the Eton-Harrow cricket match, and then read law at Christ's College, Cambridge, where he was a Half-Blue for Real tennis. He then joined the Grenadier Guards.

In 1981, he took his father's place as chairman and managing director of Redcar Racecourse, a tradition going back to the creation of the course on the family's land in 1872. There he oversaw a redevelopment of the course and in 1989 launched the Two-Year-Old Trophy, a £100,000 handicap run over six furlongs, with the handicap weights calculated according to the value of the sire's offspring, thus benefitting smaller owners.

He succeeded to the marquessate and other peerages upon the death of his father in 1989.

He was the elder brother of rock musician Lord David Dundas.

== Later life ==
Lord Zetland was appointed a Deputy Lieutenant (DL) of the County of North Yorkshire on 6 May 1994. On 28 December 2012 he was moved to the retired list upon reaching the mandatory retirement age of 75. Lord Zetland appeared as a contestant on the 4 August 1959 episode of To Tell the Truth. He resided at Aske Hall.

Lord Zetland was a significant figure in the administration of horse racing. He carried on as chairman and managing director of Redcar Racecourse until 2013, was a member of the Jockey Club, and was one of the founding directors of the British Horseracing Board in 1993. He was also a director of Aintree and Catterick racecourses and a steward at a number of other courses. Zetland also took part in horse racing as a racehorse owner and breeder.

== Marriage and children ==
Lord Zetland married Susan Chamberlin on 4 April 1964. They had four children:

- Robin Lawrence Dundas, 5th Marquess of Zetland (born 5 March 1965).
- Lord James Edward Dundas (born 2 May 1967)
- Lady Henrietta Kate Dundas (born 9 February 1970)
- Lady Victoria Clare Dundas (born 2 January 1973)

== Death ==
Lord Zetland died on 24 January 2026, at the age of 88. He was succeeded in the marquessate and other titles by his elder son, Robin.

== Arms ==
Coat of arms of Mark Dundas, 4th Marquess of Zetland
Coronet A Coronet of a Marquess Crest A Lion's Head affrontée struggling through an Oak Bush all proper fructed Or crowned with an Antique Crown of the last Escutcheon Argent a Lion rampant within a Double Tressure flory counter-flory all within a Bordure Azure Supporters On either side a Lion proper crowned with an Antique Crown Or and gorged with a Chaplet of Oak leaves Vert fructed Gold with a Shield pendent from each, the dexter being charged with Argent a Saltire and Chief Gules on a Canton of the field a Lion rampant Azure for Bruce, and the sinister being charged with lozengy Argent and Gules for Fitzwilliam Motto Essayez (Try)

== Notes ==
Peerage of the United Kingdom
Preceded by Lawrence Dundas	Marquess of Zetland; 1989–2026; Member of the House of Lords (1989–1999)	Succeeded by Robin Dundas
