= Chanel ready-to-wear collection =

Chanel collection showcased biannually

The Chanel ready-to-wear collection is a showcase held by luxury fashion house Chanel biannually for spring-summer and autumn-winter seasons during Paris Fashion Week to an audience of media, retailers, buyers, investors, and customers, under the auspices of the Chambre Syndicale du Prêt-à-Porter des Couturiers et des Créateurs de Mode.

== Chanel Ready-to-Wear Spring 2012 Runway Show ==
The Chanel Ready-to-Wear Spring 2012 Runway Show was presented on October 4, 2011 at the Grand Palais in Paris. With a massive seascape production, which Vogue described as spectacular and risk-taking, Creative Director Karl Lagerfeld unveiled 84 new looks with unconstructed jackets, cutaway backs, ostrich feather skirts, and sequined dresses in a lighter, iridescent palette of whites, creams, nudes, and metallics that shifted to pinks, corals, and blacks.

For a sportier element, Lagerfeld added drawstring waists and bomber jackets. The collection featured a variety of fabrics ranging from tweed, organza, lace, chiffon and lamé to knit, silk, and leather. With a slight 1920s influence, design details included drop-waists, pearl belts, seaweed panniers, boxy tweed jackets, and ruffles that mimicked sea sponges. There were also aquatic-themed accessories with handbags, shoes, and jewelry shaped as seashells, conch shells, and coral.

The production included stylized, oversized installations of giant sea life sculptures: stingray, sea horse, shark, anemone, and coral branches in a variety of matte, glossy, and sparkly finishes.

Florence Welch provided the soundtrack with a live performance of "What the Water Gave Me." Saskia de Brauw opened the runway show. Freja Beha Erichsen, Arizona Muse, Karlie Kloss, Tao Okamoto, Heidi Mount, Fei Fei Sun, Lindsey Wixson, Miranda Kerr, Joan Smalls, Candice Swanepoel, and Liu Wen were amongst the models who also walked the show. Stella Tennant closed the presentation.

Fashion Critic Tim Blanks described the runway presentation as "a magical underwater environment." Following the October 4, 2011 presentation, Blanks asked Lagerfeld at what point did the theme of the undersea world assert itself on the collection. Lagerfeld replied, "Nothing is more modern than the shapes in the ground of the sea who have billions of years. The sea is the same all over the world; so it's a manualization in a very modern, graphic way—and where pollution hadn't reached yet."

Blanks noted the paradoxical metaphor of creating something very modern out of something very old. "I'm happy you say that," noted Lagerfeld. "In fact, the oldest things are the most modern in a way."

== Chanel Ready-to-Wear Fall 2012 Runway Show ==
The Chanel Ready-to-Wear Fall 2012 Runway Show was presented on March 5, 2012 at the Grand Palais in Paris. Vogue Runway described the runway set as the Fortress of Solitude. Karl Lagerfeld transitioned from the depths of the ocean to the center of the Earth with 68 new looks.

The presentation's featured silhouette focused on a three-piece ensemble of jacket, shirt, and pants. The collection's dichotic inspiration sources were mineralogical and cubist. Embroidered crystals along the hemlines and cuffs referenced the former influence, while color-blocking and the angularity of the design details evoked the latter. Even the models' eyebrows were embellished by the couture embroidery house, Maison Lesage.

Vogue UK described the collections as a feast of color and texture with a feel of sorcery; this season's palette included petrol green, purple, emerald, amethyst, and sapphire. Michel Gaubert provided the runway soundtrack. Kati Nescher opened the runway show. Stella Tennant, Caroline Brasch Nielsen, Karmen Pedaru, Cara Delevingne, Edie Campbell, Lily Donaldson, Magdalena Frackowiak, and Bette Franke were amongst the models who also walked the show. Maria Bradley closed the presentation.

Tim Blanks described the pieces as new, seductive, yet wearable. Vogue Italia Editor in Chief, Franca Sozzani remarked of the collection, "It's so different from anyone, because it makes you feel like you're dreaming, but at the same time, you know that you could wear." When characterizing the runway design to Blanks, Lagerfeld said, "What is more modern? This looks like a city of skyscrapers that has exploded, in a way—so I think, nature is not such a bad designer, no? And the other inspiration in terms of cuts and shapes and embroideries is Czech cubism. I thought it was an interesting expression."

== Chanel Ready-to-Wear Spring 2013 Runway Show ==
The Chanel Ready-to-Wear Spring 2013 Runway Show was presented on October 1, 2012 at the Grand Palais in Paris. Vogue Runway described the set as having an architectural modernism. With an installation of 13 oversized wind turbines and solar panels across the length of the catwalk signifying a message of sustainable energy, Lagerfeld unveiled 80 new looks. The set was designed to underscore the collection's theme of ease and serenity.

This season's featured silhouette statements were boleros and A-line skirts, dresses, and jackets. The creative director used three-dimensional chiffon cut-outs to create more lightness, volume, and movement. He eschewed his typical use of braids, buttons, and chains in favor of a more liberal placement of pearl embellishments for a look that he described to WWD as fresh and light, with different proportions and volumes. Lagerfeld, who is approaching his 30th anniversary as Creative Director of Chanel, continues to modernize the house, without reinventing its core aesthetic. This season, he showed cropped jackets, cocoon shapes, trapeze cuts, bell sleeves, wide-cut jackets, skirt-dresses, embroidered flowers, and organza pinwheels.

Kati Nescher opened the runway show. Yumi Lambert, Lily McMenamy, MacKenzie Drazan, Stella Tennant, Jacquelyn Jablonski, Iselin Steiro, Lindsey Wixson, Montana Cox, Kaitlin Aas, Aymeline Valade, and Cara Delevingne were amongst the models who also walked the show. Marte Mei van Haaster closed the presentation.

"No braids, no classic channel buttons, no chains—just pearls, pearls, and pearls, and that's all," as Lagerfeld described his new collection to Style.com's Blanks. "It's all about volume and lightness, because normally volume and lightness don't go together. Everything is airy."

When asked if this was the biggest thing he'd ever done, in terms of the production scale, the designer responded, "I don't judge my things in terms of size. Energy is the most important thing in life. The rest comes later."

== Chanel Ready-to-Wear Fall 2013 Runway Show ==
The Chanel Ready-to-Wear Fall 2013 Runway Show was presented on March 4, 2013 at the Grand Palais in Paris. The House of Chanel marked its centennial anniversary with a production designed to celebrate the brand's market strength. An illuminated oversized globe spun in the center of the venue, with at least 300 pinned branded flags, one for every Chanel boutique, as the creative director ushered out 80 new looks to the soundtrack of Daft Punk's "Around the World."

The collection featured loose, bulky jackets, A-shapes, dropped-torsos, asymmetric hems, and statement sleeves. Fabrications included tweed, quilted silk, boucle wool, cashmere, chiffon. This season's palette featured black, white, teal, red, and grey. The darker collection was offset by glittering tweeds and woven metallics.

Ashleigh Good opened and closed the runway show. Xiao Wen Ju, Marine Deleeuw, Iris van Berne, Josephine Le Tutour, Nadja Bender, Daphne Groeneveld, Meghan Collison, Shu Pei Qin, and Louise Parker were amongst the models who also walked the show.

Actress and model Milla Jovovich said of the collection, "I love how he really brought in a lot of the essence of Coco Chanel into this collection, whether it was some of those more billowy coats—that was just so quintessentially Coco. I love how he is always able to take history and meld it with the future in the most beautiful, sensible way."

As told to Style.com, Lagerfeld noted of his collection, "It was dark, but I don't think it was sad. It's not easy to run around in pink all day. It's a very cosmopolitan, international look. It's a global look women can wear all over the world… An interesting thing is that today it's not that Europe, as big as the amount of shops, it's the rest of the world, it's the new world. And that's very interesting, because French luxury industry survives doing so well because there are all of those new fortunes in a new part of the world. And this is something I wanted to show too, that they see all the flags there in this new world… It's globalization, a fashion globalization."

== Chanel Ready-to-Wear Spring 2014 Runway Show ==
The Chanel Ready-to-Wear Spring 2014 Runway Show was presented on September 30, 2013 at the Grand Palais in Paris. This season, Lagerfeld staged an art exhibit reminiscent of Andy Warhol, the designer referenced Pop Art for a Pop Fashion collection, ushering out 89 new looks. The Grand Palais was transformed into a huge gallery of paintings and sculptures. The pieces included iconic Chanel symbols such camellias, pearls, and a bottle of No.5.

Ensembles included shrunken sweaters, leather pants, flared skirts, and voluminous tweed jackets. Accessories varied from graffiti-style backpacks, canvas shoppers with bead appliqué, metallic leather mini purses, and logo-emblazoned plexiglass bags. This season's palette varied from white and black to pink and purple. As explained to WWD, Lagerfeld noted that the show's concept began several months ahead of the collection as satire and the idea that people overact to art today. The designer created an art installation of 75 pieces as a backdrop to his presentation.

Cara Delevingne opened runway show. Devon Windsor, Ming Xi, Ieva Laguna, Grace Hartzel, Holly Rose Emery, Grace Mahary, and Josephine Skriver were amongst the models who also walked the show. Lindsey Wixson closed the presentation.

When asked about the art installation, Lagerfeld replied, "I designed it. I made small models, and then they make it bigger. Yes, I made everything. It's not different young artists; only one old artist—it's me… And I think it was right for today, no? Because life is not a red carpet. This is for daily life; that was the idea in fact."

== Chanel Ready-to-Wear Fall 2014 Runway Show ==
The Chanel Ready-to-Wear Fall 2014 Runway Show was presented on March 3, 2014 at the Grand Palais in Paris. This season, Lagerfeld's team transformed the Grand Palais into a 139,930-square-foot supermarket labyrinth, one that took each model 4.5 minutes to traverse. Monikered by Elle as the world's most luxurious and chicest supermarket, the Chanel Shopping Center was stocked with Chanel-branded merchandise, everything from doormats, paint pots, and chainsaws to Pringles, Coco Pops, and bath salts— even the guests' seats were fashioned out of cardboard boxes.

Remixes of Lady Gaga and Rihanna provided the runway soundtrack. A closing announcement created a bit of a fashion stampede, when the frenzied audience ran towards the runway clamoring for giveaways, "The shopping centre will be closing shortly, please help yourself to the complimentary fruit and veg and please come again."

The season's silhouette was anchored by hourglass shapes and strong shoulders. Most outfits were layered over leggings. Corseted waistlines and knee-length skirts were paired with trapeze coats. Fabrications included tweed, cashmere, jersey, knitwear, silk, leather, and chiffon. The multi-hued palette varied from pink, orange, yellow, and green, to burgundy purple, grey, and black. Featured accessories ranged from padlock necklaces and quilted headphones to sneakers and sneaker boots. With a sportier vibe, the show's setting made a commentary on everyday consumerism.

Interviewed post-show, Rihanna said, "I think the show was fun. It was young… I loved the silhouettes. I really, really loved the layering, the colors, the tweed—I wanted so many pieces right away… Everything was brilliant. I think was very me. I feel like I could wear everything in the collection."

"We saw the punk girl. I think I saw the sophisticated, the very young teenagers—they were all there, it feels like a brand that you can wear throughout any age," noted Alicia Vikander.

"I think that's one of the most extraordinary things about Karl," added Keira Knightley, "For however long he's been doing this, he continues to reinvent and continues to be forward-thinking, and always about the present and the future."

Cara Delevingne opened runway show, which featured 78 looks. Lindsey Wixson, Julia Nobis, Binx Walton, Kati Nescher, Malaika Firth, Stella Tennant, Pauline Hoarau, Lexi Boling, Anna Ewers, Kendall Jenner, Fei Fei Sun, and Marine Deleeuw were amongst the models who also walked the show. Nastya Sten closed the presentation.

== Chanel Ready-to-Wear Spring 2015 Runway Show ==
The Chanel Ready-to-Wear Spring 2015 Runway Show was presented on September 30, 2014 at the Grand Palais in Paris. The production was a 130-meter-long catwalk set as Boulevard Chanel staging a fashion protest. Lagerfeld's team recreated an urban cityscape with building facades, wrought-iron terraces, pavements, and puddles. This season's underlying theme was female empowerment. This was a collection about individuality and self-expression, which is why there were so many mix and match pieces.

This feminine fashion expressionism was that women should be able to dress exactly how they want. The silhouettes included everything from double-breasted suits, utility field jackets, and flared trousers to polo shirts with jogging pants, box-pleated skirts, and evening gowns. This season's fabrications were knits, silk, lace, chiffon, tweed, and leather.

Some of the finale protest signs read, "Tweed is Better Than tweet," "Be Your Own Stylist," "Make Fashion not War," "Free Freedom," "Ladies First"

"Women's Rights Are More Than Alright," and "History is Her Story." Chaka Khan's "I'm Every Woman" provided the runway soundtrack.

Cara Delevingne opened the runway show, which featured 86 looks, with a megaphone in hand. Melina Gesto, Josephine Le Tutour, Sanne Vloet, Charlotte Free, Daphne Groeneveld, Georgia May Jagger, Sam Rollinson, Lexi Boling, Zlata Mangafic, Valery Kaufman, Taylor Hill, Gigi Hadid, Kendall Jenner, Joan Smalls, and Gisele Bündchen were amongst the models who also walked the show. Lindsey Wixson closed the presentation, culminating in a feminist march protest.

As told to Tim Blanks of Style.com, Lagerfeld noted, "I like the idea to show the clothes in the street, girls walking like as if they were walking in the street. And also, there are all kinds of pieces; everybody can use, play with. It's not professional… There are no 70s, no 60s—it's more of a Mod de Viv than mod."

W Magazine's Editor-in-Chief Stefano Tonchi said of the presentation, "Karl is such a great social commentator. It's true that fashion is supposed to be the mirror of society, but he really put the mirror on our faces and he reflects the feeling and the mood and the ideas that people have in their mind.

== Chanel Ready-to-Wear Fall 2015 Runway Show ==
The Chanel Ready-to-Wear Fall 2015 Runway Show was presented on March 10, 2015 at the Grand Palais in Paris. Titled the "French Collection," this season the Grand Palais was transformed into Brasserie Gabrielle, a Left Bank cafe, with polished wood, leather, brass, and an oval bar. Ensembles focused on layering separates: blouses, cardigans, sweater gowns, oversized anoraks, leather joggers, lace leggings, pencil skirts, tweed suits, cap-toe slingbacks, origami quilted puff coats, and sheer cocktail dresses. The production included waiters and baristas serving coffee and croissants. During the presentation, models entered through a revolving door before sitting in the banquettes.

Cara Delevingne opened and closed the runway show, which featured 98 looks. Mica Arganaraz, Kendall Jenner, Joan Smalls, Grace Mahary, Sasha Luss, Taylor Hill, and Lily Donaldson were amongst the models who also walked the show.

Style.com described the runway show as Lagerfeld's love letter to Paris, "This was for the attitude, for the femininity, for the spirit of Chanel, for a kind of renewed sexiness from another age, to make it more modern," the designer explained to Tim Blanks post-show.

"The message of Chanel that evolved in something bigger, more futuristic, which I thought was interesting," noted Caroline de Maigret. "What I'm always amazed in Karl's work for Chanel is the relationship he has with France. Last time we had the demonstration in the streets that belonged to us. Now we have the French brasserie, and it moves me in a way. It's like my cultural roots that come out."

"The whole brasserie side was lovely because it is like being at my corner cafe and the feeling of being very French... And there were loads of tweeds and silhouettes that reminded me of France, reminded me of the 1960s in France and this whole culture of cafes at the time." said Lou Doillon.

"I'm a stranger so I have a distorted view on French life, because you know I'm a little tired also of people saying 'Oh France isn't good anymore.' Even the French, the famous French-bashing—so I wanted to show that are few things are not that bad and typically French, and they should enjoy what they have," Lagerfeld added. "The minute I finish one, I have to think about the next one, eh? That's why so many designers think the speed is too big and I don't think so. It's a nonstop dialogue, and if you are not ready to have a nonstop dialogue with fashion, you should do another job."

== Chanel Ready-to-Wear Spring 2016 Runway Show ==
The Chanel Ready-to-Wear Spring 2016 Runway Show was presented on October 6, 2015 at the Grand Palais in Paris. This season the venue was transformed into an airport terminal with double C luggage carts and airline staff. The Chanel Airlines Terminal included a departures board highlighting destinations for upcoming events in Shanghai, Salzburg, New York, London, and Rome.

Ensembles included tweed suits, pencil skirt, dropped shoulder jackets, and knitted skirts. Accessories this season varied from quilted carry-on bags and velcro sandals to driving gloves and aviator sunglasses. This season's palette featured white, black, silver, pink, and powder blue. Fabrications ranged from wool, leather, denim, lurex, and PVC to sequins, crystals, silk, chiffon, and tulle.

Edie Campbell opened the presentation, which featured 95 looks. Lexi Boling, Lauren de Graaf, Josephine Le Tutour, Greta Varlese, Lineisy Montero, Chiara Scelsi, and Kendall Jenner were amongst the models who also walked the show. Mica Arganaraz closed the runway show.

Lagerfeld told Style.com post-show, "Getting to the skies, you have to go through an airport... So I wanted to make the perfect airport, where boarding is a pleasure and not a nightmare, like it is now."

"This airport was like we needed more Utopian than real things; we wanted to avoid security alerts, missed luggage, all that kind of stuff. So, it was more like a happy airport," observed Michel Gaubert.

"We're flying high class and it was beautiful," said Audrey Marnay. "All the prints at the beginning and the look with the long skirts, it's always a new thing."

"I thought the collection was very fresh and colorful. There were a lot of twists at first. And I love the way the fabrics, they were like graphism on the tweed of red and blue and white. It's always a surprise with Karl, I never know where I'm going to end up."

"I like the shape of airplanes. I love airplanes. It's like a kind of butterfly," Lagerfeld added. "They also wear very formal things with nothing. The Chanel suits, there's no buttons, no braids, no pockets and it just looks Chanel. I think that's fun."

== Chanel Ready-to-Wear Fall 2016 Runway Show ==
The Chanel Ready-to-Wear Fall 2016 Runway Show was presented on March 8, 2016 at the Grand Palais in Paris. While the presentation didn't include some of the more elaborate sets that the house has been known for in recent seasons, the runway show did give every one of its 3,000 guests a gilded front seat along a 600-meter runway. Vogue UK described the collection as Chanel for the new generation.

Influenced by elevated streetwear, the silhouettes were less ladylike with a utilitarian luxe, with more deconstructed and frayed pieces. The collection featured a leaner silhouette with suits, shrunken jackets, metallic skirts, and trench coats. Accessories were oversized with jeweled belt buckles, long knitted gloves, and layered pearl necklaces. This season's palette included white, grey, black, silver, fuchsia, and red. Materials ranged from tweed, jacquard, matelasse, and leather to lamé, chiffon, organza, and lace.

Mica Arganaraz opened the presentation, which featured 93 looks. Edie Campbell, Sarah Brannon, Selena Forest, Natalia Siodmiak, Felice Veen, Julia Bergshoeff, Frederikke Sofie, Bhumika Arora, Alanna Arrington, Vittoria Ceretti, Gigi Hadid, Bella Hadid, and Kendall Jenner were amongst the models who also walked the show. Ondria Hardin closed the runway show.

Pharrell Williams told Vogue Magazine, "This show was like synchronized swimming. We got to experience his thoughts manifested, to have all of the models walk a half a mile was a huge proposition—but he pulled it off."

Lagerfeld explained, "I think the dream of a lot of people is to be on the front row for once in their life. Because the people in row number five, they don't see the detail with half a mile of runway, but the music was made that they could walk quickly and everything; it's for a fast life, you can move, you can travel..."

== Chanel Ready-to-Wear Spring 2017 Runway Show ==
Monikered "Intimate Technology" as a celebration to all things digital, the Chanel Ready-to-Wear Spring 2017 Runway Show was presented on October 4, 2016 at the Grand Palais in Paris which had been converted to a giant mainframe computer clicking, whirring, and flashing away with brightly wired circuit boards. This Chanel Data Center was the technological backdrop to robot attendants (CocoBots) in Chanel suits who welcomed show guests.

Vogue Italia described the science-fiction influenced setting as having a server room palette of white, blue, purple, green, pink, and black. Fabrications included cotton, lace, silk, tweed, leather, and lurex. Silhouettes were oversized and layered; puff jackets were paired chiffon dresses in techno and laser optic prints, while tweed jackets were worn over lace dresses. Lagerfeld created a dichotomy between the modern, metallic tweeds, which he juxtaposed against delicate underpinnings: slips, camisoles, lace shorts, and bed jackets. Accessories were metallic and embellished from ballet pumps, crystal belts, and bold necklaces to fluorescent bags with Chanel spelled out in LED lights; circuit-board clutches, and baseball caps, worn sideways.

Amanda Sanchez opened the presentation, which featured 86 looks to Donna Summer's "I Feel Love." Teddy Quinlivan, Greta Varlese, Josephine Le Tutour, Jasmine Tookes, Romee Strijd, Jing Wen, Vittoria Ceretti, Taylor Hill, Lia Pavlova, Sarah Brannon, and Odette Pavlova were amongst the models who also walked the show. Cris Herrmann closed the runway show.

Lily-Rose Depp said of the collection, "I loved the suits with the oversized coasts and skirts, and also the back-to-front jackets. You could see the little chain down the back with the Chanel logo."

"I found the mixture of tradition and technology fascinating," noted Caroline de Maigret post-show. "The classic chic, the jackets, but reworked in innovative fabrics. I loved the little wires, the computer cables that echoed the thread in the clothes."

"My favorite thing was the colorful tweed suits," explained Nana Komatsu. "I also liked how the models wore their caps to the side. It's very street style."

"A house like Chanel has these iconic pieces, which are renewed by Karl in a totally different way each time," observed Gaspard Ulliel. "I think it's a very young collection."

"The set was a perfect backdrop for the collection with its play on light and color," stated Anna Mouglalis. "There was a mixture of delicacy, modernity, and tradition that was really beautiful."

== Chanel Ready-to-Wear Fall 2017 Runway Show ==
The Chanel Ready-to-Wear Fall 2017 Runway Show was presented on March 7, 2017 at the Grand Palais in Paris. Vogue heralded Creative Director, Karl Lagerfeld as fashion's astronomer-in-chief with his starship themed-presentation, when at the finale a giant Chanel-branded rocket, measuring 35 meters or 115 feet high appeared to jettison off the catwalk to the soundtrack of Elton John's "Rocket Man." The inspiration came from local news, specifically an obsession with Thomas Pesquet, a French aerospace engineer, pilot and European Space Astronaut, who was part of ESA's Expedition 50 and 51 from November 2016 to June 2017.

The Los Angeles Times described the collection as a launchpad for interstellar luxe. This style space odyssey's, silhouettes featured boxy tweed jackets, Bermuda shorts, silver leather suits, foil quilted capes, glitter boots, and diamanté collars. The ensembles were accessorized with

bejeweled ear warmers, sparkly arm warmers, silver backpacks, and minaudière in the shape of a rocket. This season's palette was black, silver, white, grey, and blue. Fabrications included tweed, leather, shearling, wool, silk, lurex, chiffon, and jersey, embellished with crystals and sequins.

Cara Taylor opened the presentation, which featured 96 looks. Birgit Kos, Camille Hurel, Catherine McNeil, Frederikke Sofie, Kendall Jenner, Gigi Hadid, Josephine Le Tutour, and Arizona Muse were amongst the models who also walked the show. Ondria Hardin closed the runway show.

Business of Fashion Editor-at-Large Tim Blanks noted that after shows in Tokyo and Cuba, that Karl Lagerfeld had taken his collection to space, the final frontier.

"I just was thinking to myself how much it's elevated over the years," noted Rita Ora. "And just how now we can just have fun with glitter and sparkles. And like the models are all young and just it's kind of like really refreshing to see someone like Karl still really embrace kind of the new generation."

"He likes new things!" observed Ines de la Fressange, "He's never turned to the past and he never wants to talk about the past and he hates nostalgia. And it's funny, how he's a visionary."

== Chanel Ready-to-Wear Spring 2018 Runway Show ==
The Chanel Ready-to-Wear Spring 2018 Runway Show was presented on October 3, 2017 at the Grand Palais in Paris. Vogue Runway described the outdoors scenario production as an indoor Gorges du Verdon. The famous southeastern natural wonder was a metaphor for the themes of optimism, handcraft, and forward-looking fashion.

Lagerfeld showed plastic coats and capes; fringed tweed; and lurex textures with crystal-jeweled accents. The collection also featured plastic boots, hats and other protective gear layered over tweed suits and dresses, with space-age accents. With comparisons to Andre Courreges and Paco Rabanne, the collections had 1960s futurism references with 1980s undertones. Donna Summer's "I Feel Love," provided the soundtrack. Materials used included tweed, macramé, chiffon, PVC, denim, georgette, silk, and leather. The palette ranged from ivory, straw, navy, and black to turquoise, emerald, and pink.

Each season, Lagerfeld transforms the Grand Palais into a new world; previous productions have been morphed into an art gallery, a supermarket, and a rocket launching pad, but this season it was an outdoor oasis landscaped with towering cliffs, waterfalls, rocks, manmade lagoons, and sculpted panels, measuring 50' tall by 275' wide.

With 89 looks, Kaia Gerber opened the show, while Grace Elizabeth closed it. For beauty, Sam McKnight styled the models in ponytails and Tom Pecheux referenced the 1980s with blue eyeshadow and red lipstick.

== Chanel Ready-to-Wear Fall 2018 Runway Show ==
The Chanel Ready-to-Wear Fall 2018 Runway Show was presented on March 6, 2018 at the Grand Palais in Paris. Vogue Runway described the backdrop as a forest, with a runway blanketed by leaves, branches, and moss. The mood of the show was romantic and nostalgic, evoking 1980s movie star glamour.

Women's Wear Daily noted that Lagerfeld was channelling his inner Thoreau with 21 oak and poplar trees lining the "Chanel woods" production.

With 81 looks, Grace Elizabeth opened the show, while Luna Bijl closed it. The collection featured outer pieces ranging from tweed jackets to chubby fur coats and quilted puffers and closed with a finale of twelve black lace dresses. The hemlines varied from mini to knee and ankle-length. The pallette included black, grey, rust, dark green, cobalt, burgundy, gold, and ivory. The designs incorporated tweed, lame, mohair, jacquard, velvet, leather, fur, satin, and lace. For the most part, the silhouettes were clean, with elongated jackets, a-line coats, and voluminous skirts.

== Chanel Ready-to-Wear Spring 2019 Runway Show ==
The Chanel Ready-to-Wear Spring 2019 Runway Show was presented on October 2, 2018 at the Grand Palais in Paris. Monikered by Vogue Runway as the “C-side,” the Spring 2019 Ready-to-Wear collection was set against a backdrop of a tropical beachside runway, complete with a tiki hut and mini boardwalk. Transitioning from previous seasons of forests and waterfalls, this season's Chanel beachscape featured sand, turf, waves, and lifeguards. For those concerned about the lavishness or potential waste of the production, the program notes assured guests that the water used to create the 25 centimeter depth and 131 x 32 meter surface would be “reprocessed via the common sewage system operated by Eau de Paris,” while every grain of sand would be “put back into the usual circuit of the construction industry, for which it was initially intended.” The production design was said to be reminiscent of Karl Lagerfeld's childhood holidays on the island of Sylt.

As reported by Vogue Italia, “It is the beach of one of my favourite places—nothing is going on there— no boats because the sea is too rough,” Lagerfeld explained. “I went as a child – and back once for a campaign with Claudia Schiffer and Shalom Harlow,” he continued. “It's the least polluted place on earth in the middle of the North Sea—in my childhood you had to take little fishing boats to go over. But the same landscape changes every day—the dunes move with the wind.”

As told to WWD, Poppy Delevingne said post-show. “It was like going to the most glamorous beach party of all time.” She continued, “I loved all the pastel colors, all the tweeds, all the raffia hats and sandals. I loved all the models barefoot, I loved all the sunshine-y looks,” she said. “I feel like I’ve just taken a holiday, so ‘thank you, Karl.’”

The collection of 82 pastel looks in shades of mint, yellow, white, and pink, referenced late 1980s and early 1990s with oversized blazers and bike shorts. Accessories included beach ball minaudières, terry cloth handbags, and oversized straw hats. The models carried two crossbody bags simultaneously. Embroideries, playful prints, and logo-emblazoned tweed vests, caftans, and tunics were also featured.

== Chanel Ready-to-Wear Fall 2019 Runway Show ==
The Chanel Ready-to-Wear Fall 2019 Runway Show was presented on March 5, 2019 at the Grand Palais in Paris set against a snowy, alpine backdrop, monikered a miniature Gstaad by Cathy Horyn. The show was especially somber, following the passing of longtime Creative Director & Visionary, Karl Lagerfeld on February 19, 2019. The Wertheimer family appointed Lagerfeld in 1983 to spearhead the collection; for nearly four decades, he guided the house through pop cultural, political, and technological shifts. The runway collection opened with a moment of silence and a voiceover from one of Lagerfeld's podcasts.

This season the production team transformed the Grand Palais into Chalet Gardenia, a vast, snowy mountain retreat with chiming bells. The palette included black, white, tan, fuchsia, teal, and dark orange . Fabrications and prints ranged from houndstooths and tweeds to striped and fair isle. Silhouttes varied from floaty chiffon dresses, leather pants, jumpsuits, heavy capes, highwaisted pants, and puffer jackets embellished with fur, feathers, and snowflakes. David Bowie's “Heroes,” provided the runway soundtrack.

Cara Delevingne opened the runway presentation of 72 looks, while Luna Bijl closed it. Camille Hurel, Mica Arganaraz, Carolina Thaler, Anok Yai, Jing Wen, Selena Forrest, Soo Joo Park, Anna Ewers, Kaia Gerber, and Penelope Cruz also walked in the show.

== Chanel Ready-to-Wear Spring 2020 Runway Show ==
The Chanel Ready-to-Wear Spring 2020 Runway Show was presented on October 1, 2019 at the Grand Palais in Paris. It was Virginie Viard's first ready-to-wear collection since the passing of Karl Lagerfeld on February 19, 2019. This season was set against a Parisian backdrop of Rue Cambon reimagined rooftops, drainpipes and airvents included. The designer debuted tweed playsuits, coatdresses, bell-shaped skirts, tiny shorts, and sequined jackets. Jackets with flounced collars, ruffled tops with balloon sleeves, and voluminous skirts with petticoats were the more prominent design details. Day looks were accessorized with two-tone, embellished sandals, little hats, and large silk and tweed handbags. Jewelry pieces included pearl brooches, cuff bracelets, and crystal necklaces. For evening, tiered dresses and skirts were constructed of chiffon, organza, and feathers. Stripes, checks, and color blocking were featured in a palette of red, orange, pink, blue, black, and white.

Many critics noted Viard's desire to stay true to the brand's iconic, signature tweeds and Lagerfeld's grand production values, while injecting her sense of wit and youthfulness, reinterpreting the tweed suit as a romper for spring and pairing metallic shorts with camellia-laden jackets.

As told to the Italian Bureau of Fashion Network by Bruno Pavlovsky, President of Fashion at Chanel, “It's a collection that is the image of Virginie, very young, full of energy. It especially highlights her exceptional knowledge of the brand; 30 years with Karl; a perfect understanding of Mademoiselle Chanel's contribution and in addition her own inspiration.”

According to Vogue, Viard drew inspiration from the French New Wave Cinema of the 1950s and 1960s or the atmosphere of the Nouvelle Vague. She cited Brand Ambassador Kristen Stewart's biopic Seberg, along with Jean-Luc Godard's Breathless as reference points. Notably, French YouTuber and comediene Marie Benoliel caused a stir, by crashing the presentation, when she jumped up onto the runway from the audience. She was promptly escorted off the runway by Gigi Hadid.

Fashionista noted the brand's inclusivity with model casting. Maike Inga opened the runway presentation of 83 looks, while Rianne van Rompaey closed it. Sacha Quenby, Anna Ewers, Jing Wen, Gigi Hadid, Kaia Gerber, Lexi Boling, Felice Noordhoff, Sara Grace Wallerstedt, and Vittoria Ceretti also walked the show.

Hubert Barrere, Artistic Director of Lesage, also observed. “You know that with Virginie, everything is simple and obvious. I think that's maybe the message of this collection. Simpler, less fuss-one fabric that we can texturize, make lighter, more flexible, maybe even a bit more shiny, like the zinc roofs of Paris and the like lights of Paris and that simply makes everyone dream.”
