= Marine Deleeuw =

French model

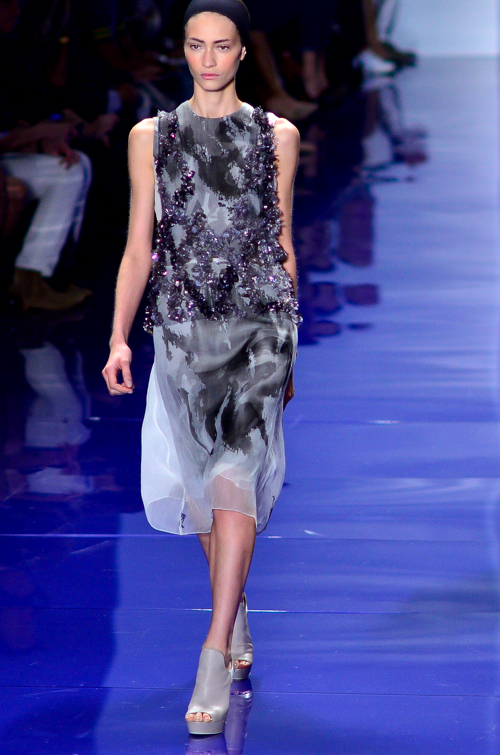
- Marine Deleeuw in a Vera Wang fashion show
- Born: 8 August 1994 (age 32); Valenciennes, France
- Occupation: Fashion model
- Years active: 2012–present
- Modeling information
- Height: 1.76 m (5 ft 9 1/2 in)
- Hair color: Brown
- Eye color: Hazel brown
- Agency: Elite Model Management (New York City, Los Angeles, Paris, Toronto); Wonderwall Management (Milan); The Squad (London); Uno Models (Barcelona); Dominique Models (Brussels); Scoop Models (Copenhagen); M4 Models (Hamburg); MIKAs (Stockholm); Vivien's Model Management (Sydney)

Marine Deleeuw (born 8 August 1994) is a French model.

== Career ==
Marine Deleeuw was discovered at a Belgian model contest called Future Top Model. She started her career in the 2012/2013 doing shows for Trussardi, Tommy Hilfiger, Thakoon Panichgul, Hervé Leger, Belstaff, Louis Vuitton, Moschino, Francesco Scognamiglio, and Missoni. She opened Rag & Bone, BCBG Max Azria, and Giambattista Valli. She closed Rag & Bone, Marc by Marc Jacobs, John Galliano, and Jill Stuart; she also walked for Chanel, Dior, Prada, Valentino and Zuhair Murad that season.

She has appeared in advertisements for Carven, Zara, Dolce & Gabbana, Louis Vuitton, Givenchy, J. Crew, Iceberg, Tory Burch, and Jil Sander among others.
