= Grace Mahary =

Canadian model (born 1989)

- Born: May 23, 1989 (age 36); Edmonton, Alberta, Canada
- Occupation: Model
- Years active: 2006–present
- Known for: VS Fashion Show 2014
- Modeling information
- Height: 1.80 m (5 ft 11 in)
- Hair color: Black
- Eye color: Brown
- Agency: IMG Models (Worldwide); SPIN Model Management (Hamburg); Stockholmsgruppen (Stockholm); Elmer Olsen Model Management (Toronto)

Grace Mahary (born May 23, 1989) is a Canadian model.

== Early life ==
Mahary was born in Edmonton, Alberta, Canada, to Eritrean parents. When she was young she played basketball with her two older brothers at the Archbishop O'Leary Catholic High School where she was studying. She can speak English, French and Tigrinya.

In 2005, she won the Elle Canada/Quebec Model Search and began modeling locally the following year.

In 2009, she starred in Trey Songz's I Invented Sex/Say Aah music video.

In 2011, she travelled to Paris in order to start an international career in modeling. Her breakthrough came in March 2012, when she walked for Givenchy as an exclusive.

== Career ==
In 2014, she walked the Victoria's Secret Fashion Show.

She has advertised Bergdorf Goodman, Carolina Herrera, Gap, Hugo Boss, Michael Kors, Nordstrom, Opening Ceremony and Prabal Gurung.

Throughout her career, she walked more than 200 runways including 3.1 Phillip Lim, Alberta Ferretti, Alexander Wang, Alexandre Vauthier, Altuzarra, Balenciaga, Balmain, BCBG Max Azria, Bottega Veneta, Céline, Chanel, Christopher Kane, Diane von Fürstenberg, Diesel Black Gold, Dior, DKNY, Dries van Noten, Dsquared2, EDUN, Emilio Pucci, Erdem, Ermanno Scervino, Fendi, Francesco Scognamiglio, Gareth Pugh, Giles, Giorgio Armani, Givenchy, H&M, Helmut Lang, Hervé Léger, Hugo Boss, Hussein Chalayan, Isabel Marant, Jill Stuart, Jonathan Saunders, Kenneth Cole, Kenzo, L'Wren Scott, Lacoste, Lanvin, Loewe, Louis Vuitton, Maison Martin Margiela, Marc Jacobs, Mary Katrantzou, Matthew Williamson, Max Mara, Michael Kors, Miu Miu, Moschino, Narciso Rodriguez, Nina Ricci, Oscar de la Renta, Paco Rabanne, Paul & Joe, Peter Som, Philip Treacy, Philipp Plein, Prabal Gurung, Prada, Proenza Schouler, Reed Krakoff, Richard Chai, Richard Nicoll, Roberto Cavalli, Salvatore Ferragamo, Tommy Hilfiger, Topshop, Valentino, Vera Wang, Victoria's Secret, Viktor & Rolf, Y-3, Yigal Azrouël, Yves Saint Laurent, Zac Posen.

She was featured on the cover of The Edit and Elle (Canada), and appeared in editorials for Bon, CR Fashion Book, Dressed to Kill, Elle, Garage, Glamour, i-D, Interview, Lurve, Numéro, Pop, Portrait, Vogue (Germany, Italia, US) and W.
