= Chiara Scelsi =

Italian fashion model

- Born: 14 June 1996 (age 30); Sesto San Giovanni, Lombardia, Italy
- Occupation: Model
- Years active: 2015–present
- Modeling information
- Height: 1.72 m (5 ft 7 1/2 in)
- Eye color: Brown
- Agency: Women Management (New York, Paris, Los Angeles); Supreme Management (Milan); Models 1 (London); Future Faces Management (Amsterdam); View Management (Barcelona); Iconic Management (Berlin); Public Image Management (Montreal); Le Management (Copenhagen); Joy Management (São Paulo)

Chiara Scelsi (born 14 June 1996) is an Italian fashion model.

== Career ==
When Scelsi was discovered, she was encouraged to go into acting, being considered too short for a high fashion model. Scelsi debuted as an exclusive at Chanel Spring/Summer 2016 show in Paris, October 2015. She is considered Karl Lagerfeld's muse. She has also modeled for DKNY, Vanessa Seward, Alberta Ferretti, Dolce & Gabbana, Polo Ralph Lauren, H&M, Diesel, Nike, Inc. and Juicy Couture.

Scelsi has appeared in InStyle magazine, Harper's Bazaar, Jalouse, Porter magazine, British Vogue, Vogue Germany, Vogue Mexico, V Magazine, Nasty Magazine, i-D magazine, Vogue Paris, Vogue Brasil, Vogue Japan, and Lui Magazine among others.

She has been on the cover of Vogue Portugal, Elle Italy, Woman Madame Figaro Spain, The Daily Front Row, WSJ, Vogue Mexico & Latin America, and Interview Germany.

She walked for the likes of Chanel, Alberta Ferretti, Dolce & Gabbana, Francesco Scognamiglio fashion shows among others.

She currently ranks on models.com's "The Money Girls" list.

In 2019, she became the new face of Chanel S/S 2019 make-up campaign shot by Karim Sadli alongside top models Vittoria Ceretti, Liu Wen, and Imaan Hammam.

During the same year she won the "Chi è Chi" Award as Top model of New Generation in Milan alongside other top names of the fashion industry as photographer Giampaolo Sgura and stylist Sissy Vian.

In 2021 she was confirmed again face of Dolce & Gabbana beauty campaign shot by photographers-duo Mert and Marcus and she graced Madame Figaro France September multiple covers lensed by photographer David Roemer.

== Personal life ==
Scelsi's father is from Calabria, Italy, and her mother is from Brazil.
