= Malaika Firth =

Kenyan-born British model

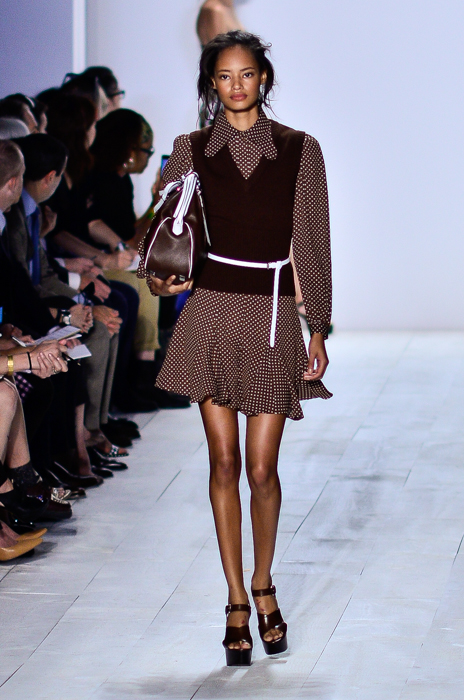
- Firth walking for Michael Kors Spring/Summer 2014 during New York Fashion Week
- Born: 23 March 1994 (age 32); Mombasa, Kenya
- Occupation: Model
- Children: 1
- Modeling information
- Height: 1.74 m (5 ft 8 1/2 in)
- Hair color: Black
- Eye color: Brown
- Agency: Marilyn Agency (New York); Oui Management (Paris); Women Management (Milan); Premier Model Management (London); R1 Mgmt (Barcelona); Le Management (Copenhagen, Stockholm); Model Management (Hamburg); Folio Montreal (Montreal); Chic Management (Sydney); DT Model Management (West Hollywood)

Malaika Firth (born 23 March 1994) is a Kenyan-born British model. In 2013, Firth attracted attention for being the first black model in nearly 20 years to appear in a Prada advertising campaign.

== Early life ==
Firth was born in Mombasa, Kenya and brought up in Barking, a suburban town in East London. Her family in Kenya belongs to the ethnic group of the Giriama. Her father, Eric, is of British, Seychellois and Ugandan descent, and mother, Jecinta, is half-Kenyan and half-Swiss. Malaika was born in Kenya and lived there until she was seven, when the family moved to Barking. Eric worked as a French polisher at the Four Seasons. When Malaika talks about her family you get a glimpse of her ambition, but also of a rootedness that might save her from her industry's worst excesses. She says, "I don't come from a posh or high-class background. We lived in flats in the ghetto, our version of 'the Bronx'. We weren't poor, but there wasn't a lot of money. I shared a room with my sister and my auntie. I struggled getting by in school, with £2 for my lunch. When the EMA (Education Maintenance Allowance) came out I was so excited – £20 a month! I appreciate everything that has happened. For me to have this career is life-changing for my family". Home is Kenya or New York – maybe Los Angeles, one day. "Everywhere is home. I am like a gypsy!" she says. She has not been back to Barking since she "blew up" – the family has all moved to Kenya, so there are no ties to east London left. "I only had one or two friends in sixth form anyway. I was bullied a lot at school. People were like – "she's so shy, she's so boring, I don't want to talk to her. But – ha! – now look where I am. I see people's comments on Instagram, talking about how well I am doing. When I think about stuff like that I just think: "Thank you, God".

== Career ==
Firth was encouraged by her mother to try out modeling, after watching an episode of "The Model Agency", which featured a documentary about the Premier Model Management. Her mother called up the agency and arranged a meeting with them. After attending an open-call casting, Firth was signed on the spot.

Beginning her modeling career at age 17, Firth soon began modeling internationally: She gave her runway-debut at the New York Fashion Week SS2012 for Odilon. She gained attention from the fashion industry after walking in the SS2014 Prada menswear show and starring in the Prada-fall 2013 campaign, which also featured Christy Turlington, Catherine McNeil, Cameron Russell, Freja Beha Erichsen, Fei Fei Sun and Rachel Williams and was shot by Steven Meisel. With this feat, she became the first Black model in 19 years to score a Prada campaign. The last Black model to book a Prada campaign was Naomi Campbell for the fall 1994 campaign.

Meanwhile, Firth experienced her runway-breakthrough with the fashion week for the Spring/Summer 2014 collections, walking more than 40 shows, including shows from Jean Paul Gaultier, Bottega Veneta, Marc Jacobs, Kenzo, Dolce & Gabbana among others. In November 2013, she debuted at the Victoria's Secret Fashion Show.

For the Spring/Summer 2014 campaign season, Firth booked campaigns from Valentino, Burberry and Prada for the second-consecutive time.

== Personal life ==
Firth is currently based in London. If it was not for modeling, Firth would have tried out acting. She acted in several amateur productions in Barking local theatre. Her grandmother runs a restaurant in Kenya.
