= Mica Argañaraz =

Argentine model and artist (born 1992)

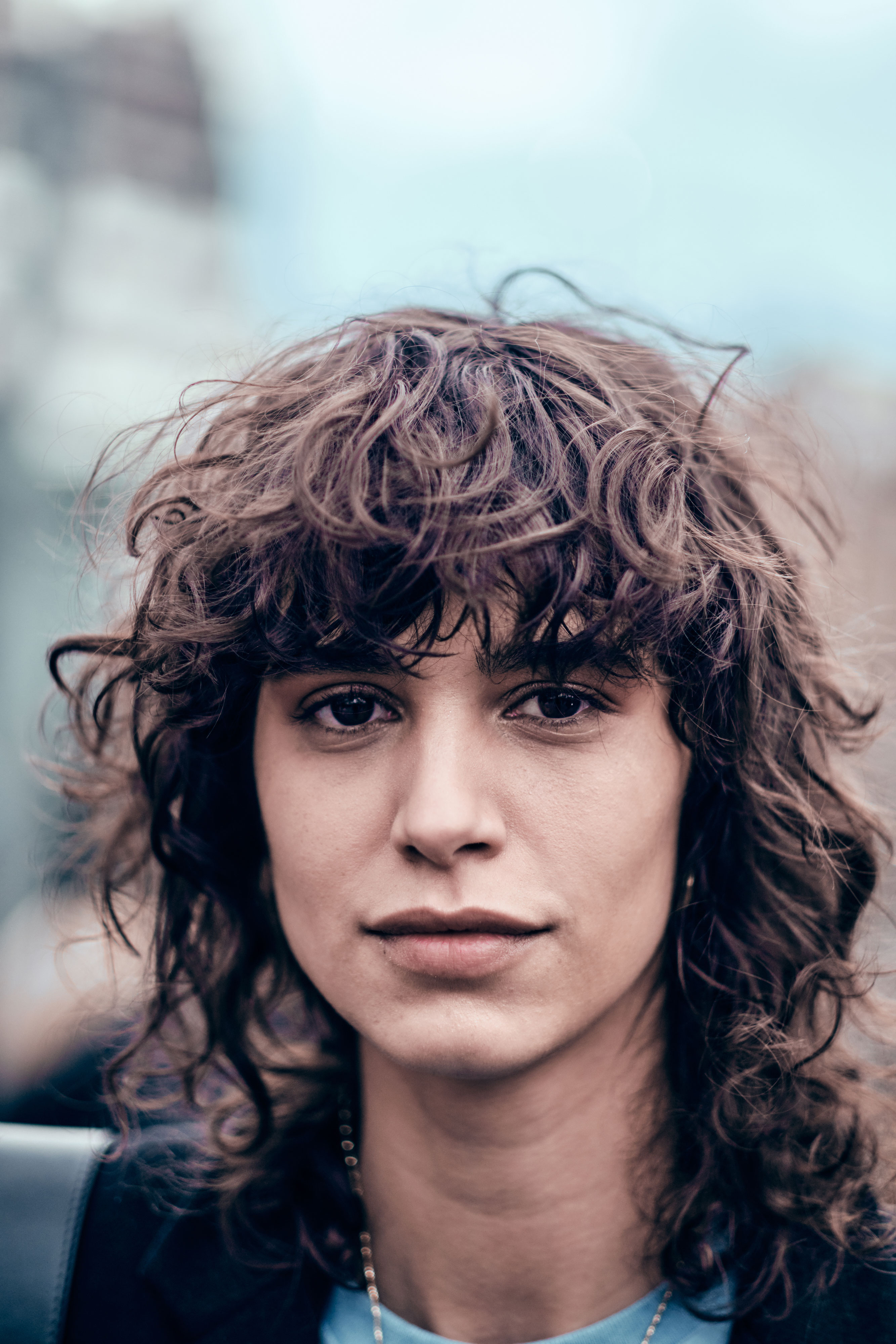
- Argañaraz in 2019
- Born: Micaela Argañaraz; 16 May 1992 (age 34); Buenos Aires, Argentina
- Occupation: Model
- Years active: 2012–present
- Modeling information
- Height: 1.78 m (5 ft 10 in)
- Hair color: Brown
- Eye color: Brown
- Agency: DNA Model Management (New York); VIVA Model Management (Paris, London, Barcelona); Why Not Model Management (Milan); LO Management (Buenos Aires)

Micaela "Mica" Argañaraz (born 16 May 1992) is an Argentine model and artist. She is best known for being a Chanel and a Versace muse, having been referred to as an it girl and "fashion force to be reckoned with". She is currently ranked as an "Industry Icon" by models.com.

== Early life and career ==
Argañaraz was born in 1992 in Buenos Aires to Gloria Ebbeke, a photographer. Her father is an agricultural producer. She has a brother named Rafael "Rafa", who is a cinematographer, and two sisters, Milagros, who works as a yoga instructor, and Ximena "Xime", who is also a model. Before modeling, Argañaraz studied cinematography. At the age of two she went to live in the fields of the Laprida district, near Olavarría. Argañaraz and her siblings attended a rural school and in the afternoons Mica took art classes. At 14, she moved to Olavarría because there was no secondary school in the country.

Argañaraz was scouted in the street, but since she was still in school she decided not to pursue a career in modeling. While attending university, Argañaraz sent polaroids to the Buenos Aires agency LO and they called her for a meeting. Argañaraz began her career in 2012, walking for Christopher Kane and appearing in the Spanish and Italian editions of Glamour and Elle respectively.

In 2014, Argañaraz starred Prada Fall/Winter womanswear campaign. In 2015 she opened the Versace Fall/Winter show and walked 61 shows that season. For the next season Spring/Summer 2016 she walked in 55 shows opening and closing five of them (including for Chanel), and in that same season she appeared in the Tom Ford campaign with Lady Gaga and other models like Lexi Boling and Aymeline Valade.

In 2016 during the Haute Couture Chanel Collection, Argañaraz was presented as the "Chanel Bride".

By 2017 she appeared in the Versace Fall/Winter campaign next to Gigi Hadid, Vittoria Ceretti, and Taylor Hill. She also starred in the Fendi campaign in 2018. In April, Argañaraz appeared on the inaugural cover of L'Officiel in her native Argentina.

In 2020, she opened her second Versace show in the Spring/Summer 2021 season.

She has been on the cover of British Vogue, Vogue Italia, Vogue Brasil, Vogue Japan, Vogue China, Vogue Paris, Vogue Germany, Vogue Russia, and Vogue Ukraine.

In advertising campaigns, she has modeled for Michael Kors, Versace, Louis Vuitton, Tom Ford, Calvin Klein, Yves Saint Laurent, Prada, Miu Miu, Chanel, Mango, Alexander McQueen, H&M, and Givenchy.

On the runway, she has walked for designers including Prada, Miu Miu, Lacoste, Michael Kors, Valentino, Fendi, Alexander Wang, Dries Van Noten, Altuzarra, Jason Wu, Stella McCartney, Hugo Boss, Tom Ford, Chanel, Dior and Louis Vuitton. She has frequently been compared to supermodel Gia Carangi, who Argañaraz considers a beauty icon.

== Personal life ==
Argañaraz is a painter, plays the guitar, and practices meditation. She lives in Paris, France. Argañaraz was in a relationship with British photographer Jamie Hawkesworth from 2014 to 2017.

== Filmography ==
Films
Year	Title	Role	Notes
2019	Lux Æterna	Mica	
2020	Saint Laurent - Summer of '21	Herself	Short film
