= Li Jingwen =

Li Jingwen, may refer to:

- Jing Wen, Chinese model.
- Li Jingwen (economist), Chinese economist.
