= Jin Wen =

Jin Wen or Jinwen may refer to:

- Chinese bronze inscriptions, Chinese scripts on ritual bronzes from around 1000 BC
- Jinwen University of Science and Technology, a university in New Taipei, Taiwan
- Jinhua–Wenzhou railway, colloquially known as Jin-Wen railway, railway in Zhejiang, China

== People ==
- Marquis Wen of Jin (805–746 BC), ruler of Jin during the Spring and Autumn period
- Duke Wen of Jin (697–628 BC), ruler of Jin during the Spring and Autumn period
- Raden Patah (1455–1518), Javanese sultan of Demak Sultanate, possibly of Chinese ancestry, known as Jin Bun or Jin Wen in Chinese

== See also ==
- Jing Wen (born 1993), Chinese fashion model
