= Meici =

Chinese online clothing retailer

MEICI (Chinese: 美西时尚) is an online retailer of clothing, based in Shanghai, China and aimed at Chinese consumers. It was established in 2008 by Jeffrey Wang, former digital marketing director of OgilvyOne China.

Designers featured on the site range from large brands like Fendi and Miu Miu, to smaller designers like Jenny Ji (La vie) and Elysee Yang. The selection is geared towards young professional women in China.

Meici claims more than 200,000 visitors a month and over a ¥1 million in sales.
