= Frederikke Sofie =

Danish fashion model (born c. 1997)

- Born: Frederikke Sofie Falbe-Hansen c. February 15, 1997 (age 29); Copenhagen, Denmark
- Occupation: Fashion model
- Years active: 2014–present
- Modeling information
- Height: 1.76 m (5 ft 9 1/2 in)
- Hair color: Blonde
- Eye color: Blue
- Agency: Oui Management (Paris); DNA Model Management (New York); The Fabbrica (Milan); Select Model Management (London); 2pm Model Management (Copenhagen)

Frederikke Sofie Falbe-Hansen is a Danish fashion model. She has notably starred in campaigns for Céline, Chloé, Ralph Lauren, and H&M. Her beauty has been compared to the Greek goddess Aphrodite and she is known for her fashionable "geeky" eyeglasses. In 2016, she was a nominee for Models.com Model of the Year Award's Breakout Star of the Year and was runner-up for Street Style Star of the Year.

== Career ==
Frederikke Sofie was scouted at a concert in Copenhagen, Denmark and became a model in order to travel the world and make money. Her first fashion shows were walking for Paul Smith, David Koma, Christopher Kane, and Peter Pilotto. She has also walked in fashion shows for Céline, Altuzarra, Jason Wu, Thakoon, Fenty x Puma, DKNY, Marchesa, Narciso Rodriguez, Tommy Hilfiger, Stella McCartney, Jill Stuart, Chanel, Kenzo, Sonia Rykiel, Mugler, Isabel Marant, Lanvin, Giambattista Valli, Missoni, Dolce and Gabbana, Etro, Bottega Veneta, Fendi, Michael Kors, Vera Wang and Carolina Herrera.

In magazines she has appeared in American Vogue, Vogue Italia, Vogue China, Vogue Germany, Vogue Paris, British Vogue, i-D Magazine, W Magazine, L'Officiel, WSJ, and CR Fashion Book.

== Image and style ==
In the fashion world, Frederikke Sofie is well known for her wavy blonde hair and her street style which has been celebrated by magazines like Vogue, Vogue Paris, W, and Women's Wear Daily.
