= Freja Beha Erichsen =

Danish fashion model (born 1987)

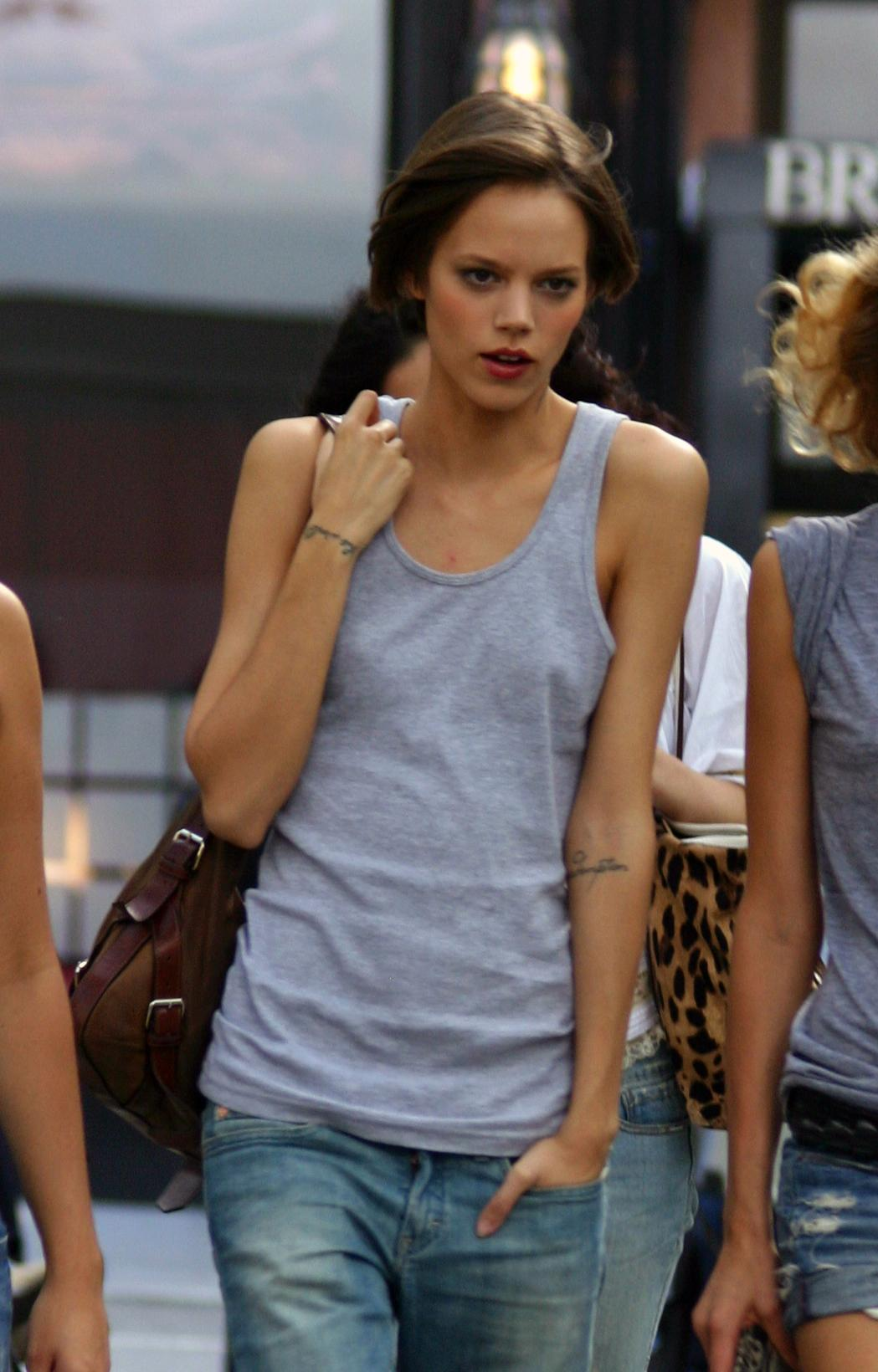
- Erichsen in September 2007
- Born: 18 October 1987 (age 38); Roskilde, Denmark
- Occupation: Model
- Years active: 2005–present
- Modeling information
- Height: 1.79 m (5 ft 10 in)
- Hair color: Brown
- Eye color: Brown
- Agency: DNA Models (New York); Dominique Models (Brussels); UNIQUE DENMARK (Copenhagen); Louisa Models (Munich)

Freja Beha Erichsen (born 18 October 1987), also known as Freja Beha, is a Danish model. Dubbed as the "Queen of Cool", she is known for her androgynous look and for being one of the muses of the late Karl Lagerfeld.

== Early life and education ==
Erichsen was born in Roskilde, Denmark. She was educated at Frederiksberg Gymnasium high school.

== Career ==
Discovered on the streets of her native Denmark by a modeling agent passing by, Erichsen made her debut as a model in 2005 at the fall Paris and Milan shows of Prada, Louis Vuitton and Miu Miu (which she opened). She continues to walk the runways of New York, Paris, Milan and also London, both in the Ready-to-wear and Haute Couture seasons. She has appeared in editorials for American, French, Italian, Australian, German, British, Chinese, Japanese, Korean, and Russian editions of Vogue, Interview, W, American and Russian Harper's Bazaar, French and Korean Numéro, i-D, V, and Purple. She has also appeared on the cover of Italian, French, and British Vogue, Korean Numéro, i-D, V, and W. In 2008, casting agent James Scully said of Erichsen:

The queen of cool. Probably one of the most-requested models of all my clients. She is the perfect old-school clothes-hanger with a little eighties androgyny thrown in.

Erichsen has walked the runways for Miu Miu, Dolce & Gabbana, Tom Ford, Shiatzy Chen, Chanel, Dior, Gucci, Versace, Burberry, Anna Sui, DKNY, Jean Paul Gaultier, Oscar de la Renta, Michael Kors, Dior, Kenzo, Just Cavalli, Versace, Marc Jacobs, Paco Rabanne, Carolina Herrera, Givenchy, Proenza Schouler, Alexander McQueen, Loewe, Céline, Diane von Fürstenberg, Zac Posen, Salvatore Ferragamo, Emilio Pucci, John Galliano, Giambattista Valli, Moschino, Tommy Hilfiger, Elie Saab, Alexander Wang, Blumarine, Dries Van Noten, Fendi, Vera Wang, Stella McCartney, Prada, Balenciaga, Diesel, Balmain, Jil Sander, Alberta Ferretti, Derek Lam, Balenciaga, Christian Lacroix, Sonia Rykiel, Lanvin, and Louis Vuitton.

She has appeared in advertising campaigns for Karl Lagerfeld, Balenciaga, Gucci, Bottega Veneta, Harry Winston, Inc., Yves Saint Laurent, Moncler, Georg Jensen, Hugo Boss, Missoni, Louis Vuitton, rag+bone, Anthony Vaccarello, Calvin Klein, Bally, Tiffany & Co., Hermès, Isabel Marant, Coach, Zara, Chanel, Michael Kors, Gianfranco Ferré, Pringle of Scotland, Emporio Armani, Jil Sander, Roberto Cavalli, Chloé, MaxMara, Valentino, Jaeger, H&M, GAP, Prada Tom Ford, and Pollini. She is one of the faces of the fragrance Gucci by Gucci alongside Natasha Poly and Raquel Zimmermann, and starred in the television advertisement directed by David Lynch. She was also the face of the Calvin Klein fragrance IN2U. In 2011, she became the face of the fragrance Valentina by Valentino.

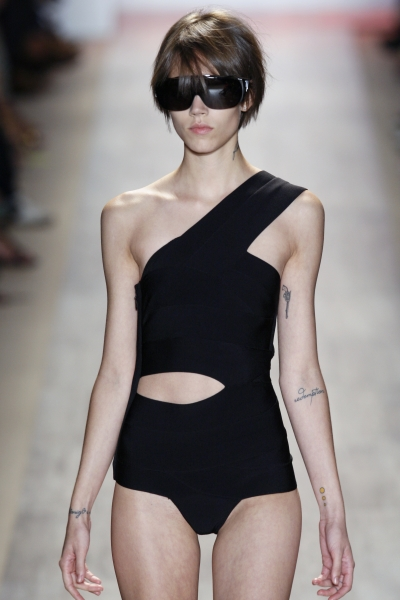
Erichsen on the runway at the Herve Leger Summer 2009 show in New York

Erichsen has had a number of fashion items named after her, including the Jill Stuart Freja handbag, the Chloé Freja clutch, and the Alexander Wang Freja Lace-Up Stiletto Boot with Zip Detail.

At the height of her career she was ranked second on the Top 50 Models Women list by models.com, along with Natasha Poly. As of October 2013, she is listed as one of the "Industry Icons". Vogue Paris declared her one of the top 30 models of the 2000s.

Erichsen is featured in the 2011 edition of the Pirelli Calendar, photographed by Karl Lagerfeld. Erichsen is part of history, in what marks the magazine's first multi-cover in the publication's 95-years, landing one of the three May Vogue UK covers in celebration of the most anticipated wedding of the year - the Royal wedding.

In 2020, Erichsen appeared in the Prada Fall-Winter campaign.

In 2022, she had a cameo appearance as Bente in the Swedish Netflix mini series Clark.

== Personal life ==
Erichsen enjoys listening to the music of PJ Harvey, the Danish group Kira and the Kindred Spirits, Janis Joplin and Jeff Buckley. She currently resides in New York City. Erichsen is a lesbian.
