= Kätlin Aas =

Estonian fashion model (born 1992)

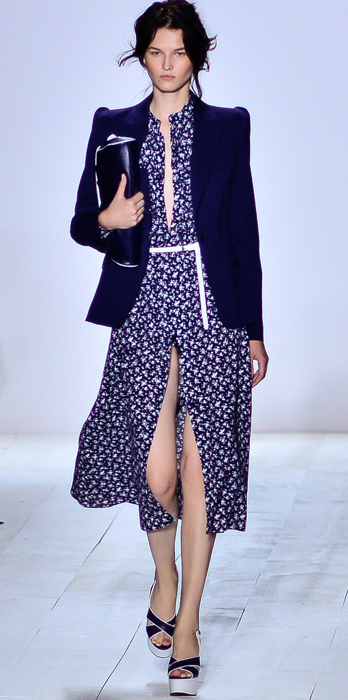
- Michael Kors Spring-Summer 2014
- Born: Kätlin Aas; 26 December 1992 (age 33); Tallinn, Estonia
- Modelling information
- Height: 5 ft 10 in (1.78 m)
- Hair colour: dark brown
- Eye colour: green
- Agency: Supreme Management (New York, Paris); Women Management (Milan); TESS Management (London); R1 Mgmt (Barcelona); Modelwerk (Hamburg); Public Image Management (Montreal)

Kätlin Aas (/ˈkeɪtlɪn/; Estonian pronunciation: [kætlin ɑːs], born 26 December 1992) is an Estonian fashion model.

== Career ==
Aas was scouted at age fourteen while dancing with an ensemble at a summer music festival in Tallinn by a representative for an Estonian modeling agency. Aas initially declined the offer, but took the representative's business card home with her and showed it to her parents, who suggested she try modeling. Accompanied by her parents, Aas went to the agency and a short time later signed a contract.

Aas made her London modeling debut in 2009, first opening the show for Christopher Kane, then opening and also closing for Prada, and then in Paris, exclusively modeling for Miu Miu. In a 2009 article titled "Meet the new girl: Kätlin Aas," The Cut remarked on her Prada "runway coup."

She has also modelled for many other brands, such as Valentino, Versace, Dior, Dolce & Gabbana, Fendi, Hermès, Balmain, Givenchy, Bulgari, Balenciaga, Tom Ford, Yves Saint Laurent, Alexander McQueen, Michael Kors, Moschino, Missoni, Jean-Paul Gaultier, Oscar de la Renta, Marc Jacobs, Haider Ackermann and GAP.

In 2013 Aas was ranked as one of Models.com's top 50 models. The same year, she appeared on the cover of Ukrainian Vogue with Eugene Hütz of Gogol Bordello. In 2014, she appeared on the June/July cover of Numéro. and the July cover of Vogue Turkey with Devon Windsor and Jeneil Williams. In February 2017 she appeared on the cover of Vogue Portugal, and in July of the same year, she was featured on the cover of Harper's Bazaar UK magazine. In 2018, she appeared on the December cover of Dutch Vogue. Aas has also appeared in Mexican, Spanish, Japanese, and Italian editions of Vogue.

In addition to her modeling work, Aas appeared as an actress in Dior's 2014 campaign "Secret Garden." She, Daria Strokous, and Fei Fei Sun were portrayed as The Three Graces in the gardens of Versailles.

According to Italian Vogue, Aas stands out "for her features that are at the same time modern and retro, but also for her great versatility that have earned her a starring role in the spring/summer 2012 ad campaigns for Francesco Scognamiglio and Ter et Bantine."

== Controversy ==
On 4 August 2014, Gap Inc. posted a photograph of Aas modeling a plaid shirt on Twitter that received a backlash over Aas' thin appearance. Twitter users responded to the image, in part, by calling Aas a "zombie", a "concentration camp prisoner," and "anorexic." Gap representative Edie Kissko responded to the criticism by stating that Gap's goal was to always promote diversity and to support people as they are, adding, "Customer feedback is important to us, and we think this conversation is a valuable lesson." The company, however, refused to remove the image. Aas responded to the criticism by posting a photograph of herself on her Instagram page posed as though she is about to consume a plate of pills, cotton, and cigarettes, with the caption, "Given everyone's opinion, should this be my breakfast?"
