= Jalouse (magazine) =

French youth culture magazine

- Cover of the magazines first issue, with model Jenny Knight (May 1997)
- Frequency: Monthly
- Publisher: Éditions Jalou
- First issue: 1997
- Final issue: 2020
- Country: France
- Based in: Paris
- Language: French
- ISSN: 1281-0282

Jalouse was a French youth fashion and culture magazine created in 1997 by Éditions Jalou which ceased publication in 2020.

== History ==
On 24 April 1997, Jalouse was launched with a circulation of over 100,000 after its first three issues. The magazine targeted women aged 18 to 30 and the first issue had 170,000 issues printed, with 44 pages of advertising and 120 pages of content which was a mix of fashion and travel.

Jalouse USA launched in early 2001 based in New York City and edited by Stephen Todd. The magazines first issue had 100,000 copies printed. In October 2001 the magazine was reported to have ceased publication however it was confirmed that the magazines frequency was being changed.

In 2002, Jalouse USA folded citing a drop in advertising following the events of the September 11 attacks. In late 2002 it was announced that the magazine would relaunch in a partnership with Empire Media, however the relaunch never eventuated.

In 2005 the magazine launched a different light weight format which was cheaper than the normal version of Jalouse and aimed at attracting younger readers.

The December 2005 issue featured a free vibrator as a gift which came with 40,000 copies of the magazine available on newsstands.

For the magazines 10th anniversary in 2007 a short film called Jalouse was directed by Matthew Frost starring Léa Seydoux (as Lauréne), Marissa Berenson (as Belinda Jones-Rostand), Nora Zehetner (as Jane Morris), Caroline de Maigret (as Prudence), Alexia Landeau (as Sarah), Anne Charrier (as Louise) and more.

It was announced in May 2013 that by the end of the year the magazine would launch Chinese and Russian editions. The Chinese edition was launched in late 2013 as Jalouse 艺术时尚 however it ceased publication in 2014.

Anne Sophie Thomas left the magazine in 2014 and became editor-in-chief of Marie Claire.

The magazines publisher and parent company Éditions Jalou was placed into receivership in 2015 after being ordered to pay €4.2 million to the former licence holder to L'Officiel in Russia.

The Chinese edition was relaunched in 2019 as Jalouse China. The first issue had a variety of covers featuring Blackpink, Z.Tao and Zheng Shuang. The magazine ceased publication in 2020 after only two issues.

It was reported by WWD (Women's Wear Daily) in 2020 that freelancers for the magazine had not been paid.

After the magazines Spring 2020 issue it ceased publication, it became digital-only before closing in 2021. Jalouse China also ceased its print edition in 2021 and continued with a presence on Chinese social media platforms until around 2025.

== Circulation ==
Total Circulation (France and internationally)
Year	2013	2014	2015	2016
Circulation	579,556	585,706	449,836	391,928

== Editions ==
Country	Circulation Dates	Editor-in-Chiefs	Start year	End year
France (Jalouse)	1997–2020	Alexandra Senes	1997	2006
France (Jalouse)	1997–2020	Daphné Hézard	2006	2010
France (Jalouse)	1997–2020	Jennifer Eymère	2010	2020
United States (Jalouse USA)	2001–2002	Stephen Todd	2001	2002
Russia (Jalouse)	2001–2006	Alla Belyakova (Алла Белякова)	2001	
China (Jalouse China)	2013–2014			
China (Jalouse China)	2019–2024 or 2025	Hanqing Zhang (张寒青)	2019	
China (Jalouse China)	2019–2024 or 2025	Rain Lu (陆桂雨)	2021	2021
