= Joséphine Le Tutour =

French model (born 1994)

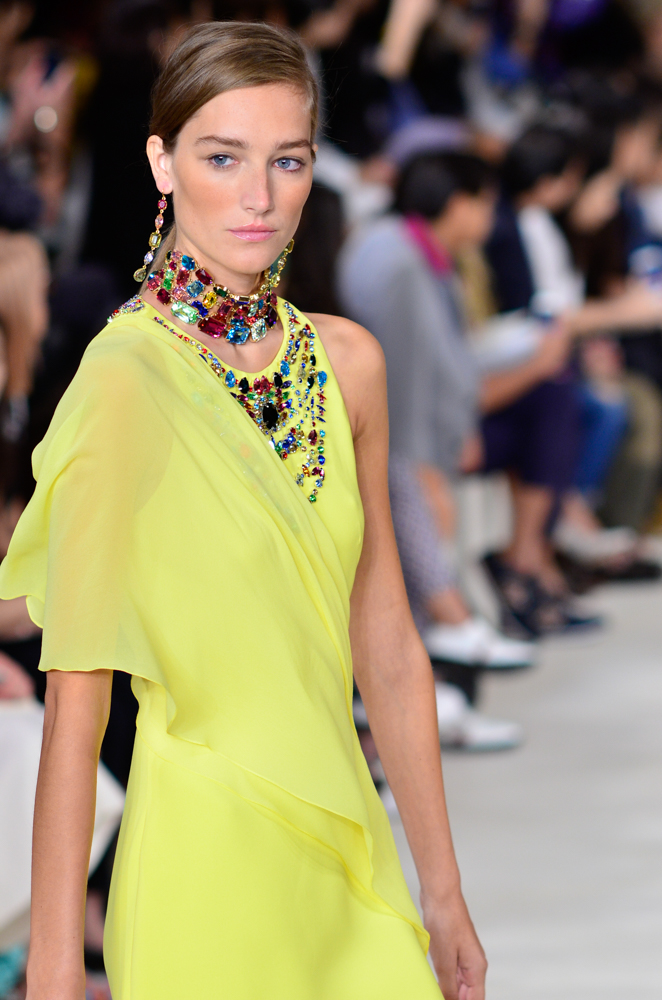
- Joséphine Le Tutour walking the runway for Ralph Lauren in 2014.
- Born: November 20, 1994 (age 31); Camors, France
- Occupation: Model
- Modeling information
- Height: 1.79 m (5 ft 10 in)
- Hair color: Dark blonde
- Eye color: Blue-green
- Agency: Women Management (New York); Elite Model Management (Paris, Milan, London, Barcelona, Copenhagen); BE MODELS MANAGEMENT (Brussels); Model Management (Hamburg); Munich Models (Munich); MP Stockholm (Stockholm); THE.mgmt (Sydney)

Joséphine Le Tutour (born November 20, 1994) is a French model.

== Early life ==
Joséphine Le Tutour won the French edition of Elite Model Look and represented her country for the international contest where she placed seventh. She has a baccalauréat ES. Not long after graduating, she was sent to Australia in order to learn how to pose and walk the runway.

Her brother Jules is also a model signed to Elite Model Management. They walked for Sonia Rykiel together in 2015.

== Career ==
Throughout her career, she advertised Alberta Ferretti, Bottega Veneta, Carolina Herrera, Chloé, Derek Lam, Diane von Fürstenberg, Dior, Donna Karan, Etro, Giorgio Armani, Gucci, Hugo Boss, Iceberg, Jil Sander, Joe Fresh, Michael Kors, Mugler, Ports 1961, Tiffany & Co., Vera Wang, VINCE., Y-3 and Zara.

She walked more than 300 fashion shows including Alexander McQueen, Anthony Vaccarello, Calvin Klein, Carven, Cédric Charlier, Céline, Chanel, Elie Saab, Fendi, Giambattista Valli, Gianfranco Ferré, John Galliano, Marni, Missoni, Nina Ricci, Saint Laurent, Sonia Rykiel, Stella McCartney, Valentino, Vanessa Bruno, Véronique Leroy,
