= Lindsey Wixson =

American model (born 1994)

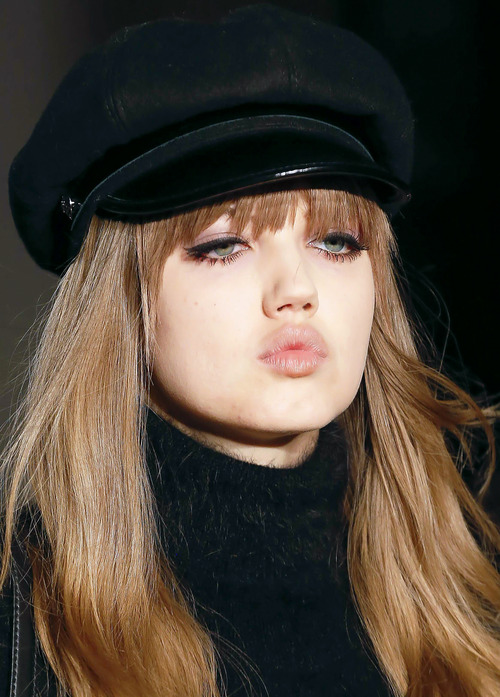
- Lindsey Wixson at Emilio Pucci F/W 2013
- Born: Lindsey Wixson; April 11, 1994 (age 32); Wichita, Kansas, U.S.
- Years active: 2009–present
- Spouse: Brion Starr (m. 2024)
- Modeling information
- Height: 5 ft 10 in (1.78 m)
- Hair color: Blonde
- Eye color: Blue
- Agency: The Society Management (New York); Elite Model Management (Paris, Copenhagen); d'management group (Milan); Storm Management (London); Model Management (Hamburg); VISION (Los Angeles) (mother agency)

Lindsey Brooke Wixson (born April 11, 1994) is an American model. She is known for her unique looks, defined in part by her "bee-stung lips", "rosebud pout", and gapped front teeth. She is best known for her campaigns with designers such as Chanel, John Galliano, Versace Vanitas, Miu Miu, Jill Stuart, and Alexander McQueen.

== Early life ==
Wixson was born in Wichita, Kansas on April 11, 1994, to Thomas, who works installing satellite dishes, and Michele, a school bus driver. She has a sister, Kirsten. Wixson inherited her gapped teeth from her father. As a young girl she wanted to be either a chef or a lawyer.

In middle school Wixson was bullied having her tooth gap called a "parking lot", making her self-conscious about her looks. At 12 years old and 5'7", strangers would come up to her to tell her she could be a model, so she started researching it as a possible career. Around the same time, she was inspired by an article in the Reader's Digest about Bill Gates and other millionaires, stating that "it was talking about how they took the chance and they took their opportunities and they took it to a whole other level". Wixson decided to become a model, and studied old copies of Vogue, looking at the careers of supermodels like Gisele, Christy and Kate.

Wixson first signed with an agency in Kansas, Models and Images, who connected her with Vision LA. Her parents made the decision to take out a loan and drive down to Los Angeles.

== Career ==
=== Breakthrough, 2009–2010 ===
Wixson began her modeling career in 2009 when she signed with Vision Models in Los Angeles. In June 2009, she went to New York where she was rejected by IMG Models and several other agencies because casting directors thought her looks would not translate well on and off the runway, except for one: Marilyn Agency. At just 15, she was hand-selected by Steven Meisel after finding a video of her on Models.com and booked her for Vogue Italia, her first job. Her runway debut was at the Spring 2010 New York Fashion Week walking for Cynthia Steffe. Wixson then went to Milan where she opened the spring 2010 Prada show and then closed for Miu Miu in Paris, both as exclusives, thus making her one of the most successful newcomers that season. By September, W editor Stefano Tonchi ran a full-page close-up of her lips and the gap in her teeth, her two most arresting features, in his first issue of W magazine. She then became the face of Miu Miu's Spring 2010 campaign shot by Mert Alas and Marcus Piggott. A press release about the campaign called her the "embodiment of a free-spirit on the cusp of womanhood" (she would stay with the brand for a two-season run). But, Wixson has her limits in what she models, during a W editorial shoot titled "Run of Show" shot by Craig McDean she requested a bra because her top was see-through, W notes that a lot of models wouldn't have done that. Photographer Gabrielle Revere was commissioned by LIFE magazine to photograph Wixson as she worked at New York Fashion Week. The story chronicles the life of how a 15-year-old teen model navigates her way through fittings, hair, makeup and the runway. A selection of 10 unpublished photographs from the LIFE magazine shoot were displayed at Sotheby's in Photographer Gabrielle Revere's exhibition titled "I Remain, You Desire" in 2010. She ended the season with the fall/winter campaigns for Miu Miu, Jill Stuart Beauty, Barney's, Versace Vanitas Fragrance, and Galliano. She also walked in a combined 44 shows in New York, Paris and Milan in the fall. And booked her first major magazine cover, for the i-D fall 2010 issue.

=== Rising star, 2011–2014 ===
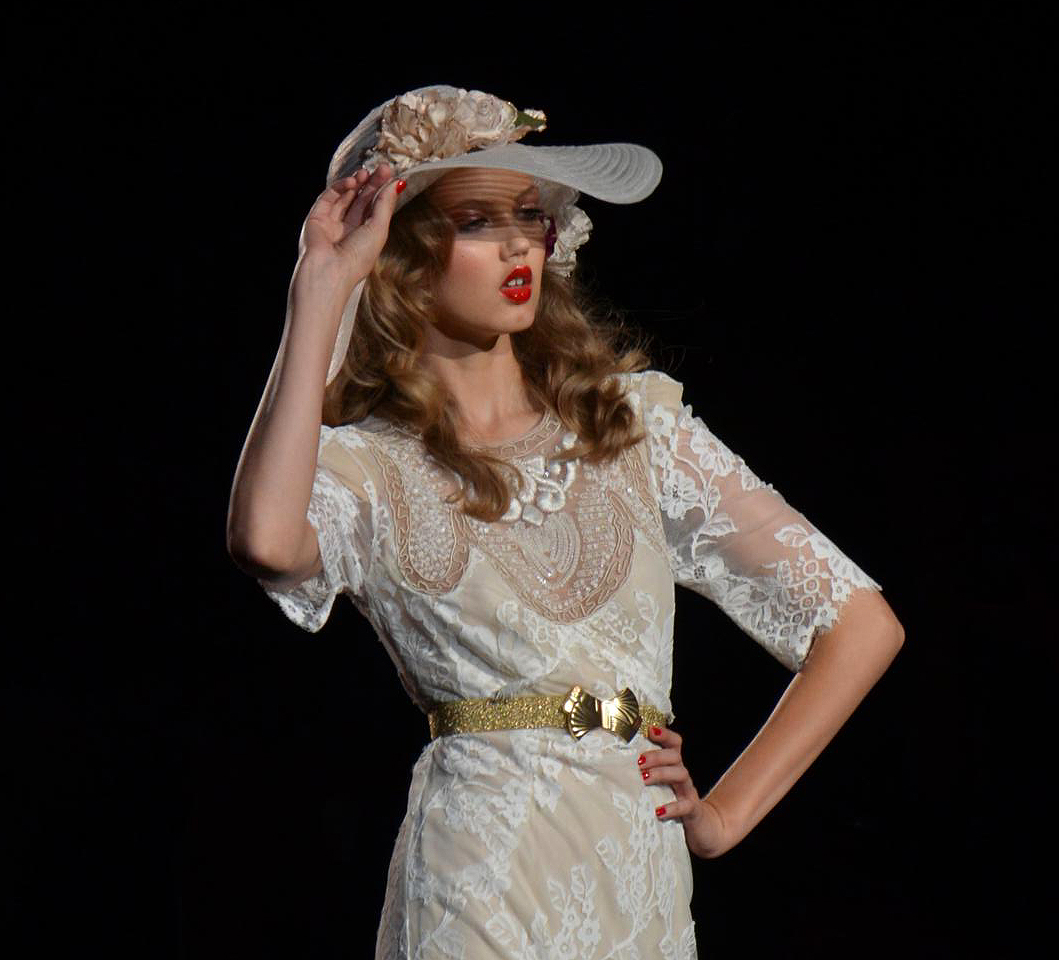
Lindsey Wixson in November 2011

Proclaimed as the modelling world's biggest rising star, Wixson started off the spring/summer 2011 season in campaigns for Mulberry, Barney's, Alexander McQueen, Jill Stuart, Jill Stuart's Night Jewels Fragrance, Jill Stuart Beauty, and Versace Vanitas Fragrance. As well as modeled for Chanel’s spring makeup collection. She did her first editorial work for Vogue, a two-model shoot with Coco Rocha. Her agent, Cheri Bowen at Marilyn Agency, said that Wixson is more interested in quality than quantity, "She's incredibly intelligent about the business. She's not about selling out". Wixson made her national television appearance on CNN, being introduced a "teen supermodel" at 17, as the cameras and reporter Alina Cho followed her home to Wichita to film her prom experience. Wixson has walked for a number of key labels this season, from Rodarte in New York to Zac Posen and Gaultier in Paris, but due to an allergic reaction to the make-up she had to cut her stint short at Paris Fashion Week, missing out on a number of the city's big shows.

In 2013, Wixson joined The Society Management in New York and Elite Model Management in Paris. In January of the same year she was also featured in the psychedelic band Animal Collective's video for their song Applesauce from Centipede Hz. During the 2014 Paris Fashion Week, she modelled for Elie Saab and Atelier Versace, and for the Chanel Haute Couture show in Salzburg. She also appeared on the covers of Russian, Korean, Japanese and Ukrainian Vogue. In December, Wixson was photographed for the cover of Elle Japan, by Karl Lagerfeld.

=== Continued Success, 2015–2017 ===
In 2015, Wixson appeared in campaigns for Chanel, Versace, Urban Outfitters, H&M and Fendi. She again appeared on the covers of Korean and Russian Vogue as well as Vogue Turkey. That season, she walked for designers including Chanel, Fendi, Roland Mouret, Michael Kors, Vera Wang, Balmain, Diane von Fürstenberg, Max Mara and Tom Ford.

In 2016, Wixson fronted campaigns for Jill Stuart and River Island. She walked the Chanel Resort wear show in Cuba, Chanel, Balmain and Gaultier at Paris Fashion Week and Moschino and Max Mara at Milan Fashion Week. She also modelled for the cover of Russian Harper's Bazaar.

Wixson began 2017 fronting a campaign for Dior, walking the Spring 2017 Chanel Haute Couture Show as well as appearing on the cover of Mexican Harper's Bazaar.

=== Hiatus, 2017–2018 ===
In July 2017, Wixson had announced that she would retire from modeling due to an "injury [that] has put me in a position to retire from this high-heel business." Wixson had suffered a foot injury that required her to refrain from continuing her modeling career, and decided to focus on "designing interiors, pottery, sculpting, carving, and inventing for the future."

=== Return, 2018–present ===
After recovering from her injury Wixson returned to further solidifying her supermodel status by walking for such designers as Fendi, Miu Miu, and Marc Jacobs as well as starring in campaigns for Vivienne Westwood and Fenty.

In 2023, Wixson received news she was expecting a child, she went on to walk shows for Dsquared2 and MSGM while pregnant.

In September 2024, Wixson walked the runway at Paris Fashion Week S/S 2025 for Maison Yoshiki Paris, the high fashion brand created by Japanese rock star Yoshiki.

== Personal life ==
Wixson's hobbies include art and writing. When she finishes modeling Wixson said she would love to become a pilot. Her model friends include Daphne Groeneveld, Camille Rowe, Ethan James Green and Aymeline Valade. Wixson expressed that modelling really helped build her confidence and is inspired by Kate Moss's fashion style.

In 2011, her prom dress was designed especially for her by Jason Wu, the same designer who designed Michelle Obama's dress for the inauguration.

Wixson and musician Brion Starr were married at New York City Hall on February 14, 2024. The couple have one child together and reside in New York City.
