= Tom Pecheux =

French make-up artist (born 1963)

- Born: 3 February 1963 (age 63); Burgundy, France
- Occupation: Make-up artist

Tom Pecheux (born 3 February 1963) is a French make-up artist and currently the Global Beauty Director for Yves Saint Laurent Beauty.

== Early life ==
Born and raised on a farm in Burgundy, France, Pecheux experienced a childhood deeply connected to nature. His father, a farmer and winemaker, instilled a love for gardening in Pecheux from an early age.

Although his family's agricultural background shaped much of his early life, Pecheux discovered a passion for the culinary arts during his formative years. Initially aspiring to become a pastry chef, he dedicated three years to formal education and training in the field. Cooking became a profound love for Pecheux, who found solace and creativity in the kitchen. After completing his studies, Pecheux relocated to Paris to embark on his professional journey. He secured a position as a pastry chef assistant at a prominent hotel, where he honed his skills and gained invaluable experience.

At age 19, while working in Paris, Pecheux began to explore his interest in makeup artistry, a latent passion that had remained dormant for years. This curiosity led him to experiment with makeup techniques, gradually realizing his talent and eye for aesthetics. The transition from the world of pastries to the realm of beauty seemed natural to Pecheux, who eagerly embraced the new artistic medium.

== Career ==
Pecheux commenced his cosmetics journey as an assistant to acclaimed makeup artist Linda Cantello and quickly established himself as a notable presence in the industry. Over the years, he has worked with a distinguished roster of photographers, including Mario Testino, Patrick Demarchelier, Craig McDean, Peter Lindbergh, and Mert and Marcus.

In 2009, Pecheux was named Creative Makeup Director for Estée Lauder.

From 2014 to 2018, Pecheux served as the key makeup artist for Chanel runway shows.

In 2017, Pecheux was appointed as the Global Beauty Director for Yves Saint Laurent Beauty.

Pecheux has done make-up for runway shows and advertising campaigns for clients like Balmain, Lanvin, Emilio Pucci, Prada and Givenchy.
