= Camille Hurel =

French fashion model (born 1998)

- Born: February 7, 1998 (age 28); Paris, France
- Occupation: Fashion model
- Years active: 2014–present
- Modeling information
- Height: 1.79 m (5 ft 10 1/2 in)
- Hair color: Brown
- Eye color: Brown
- Agency: The Squad (London); Elite Model Management (Barcelona); Unique Models (Copenhagen); Modelwerk (Hamburg); Women Management (New York, Milan, Paris) (mother agency)

Camille Hurel (born February 7, 1998) is a French fashion model.

== Career ==
She participated in the Elite Model Look contest. She debuted as a Givenchy semi-exclusive F/W 2015. (Though Elite Model Management sponsors the contest, she was scouted by Women Management). She had walked in 52 shows during the S/S 2017 season. She has walked the runway for Dior, Valentino, Fendi, Chanel, Versace, Alberta Ferretti, and Versace.

Hurel was one of Karl Lagerfeld's bride for Chanel Haute Couture. Hurel appeared on models.com's "Hot List" in 2018.
