= Caroline de Maigret =

French model

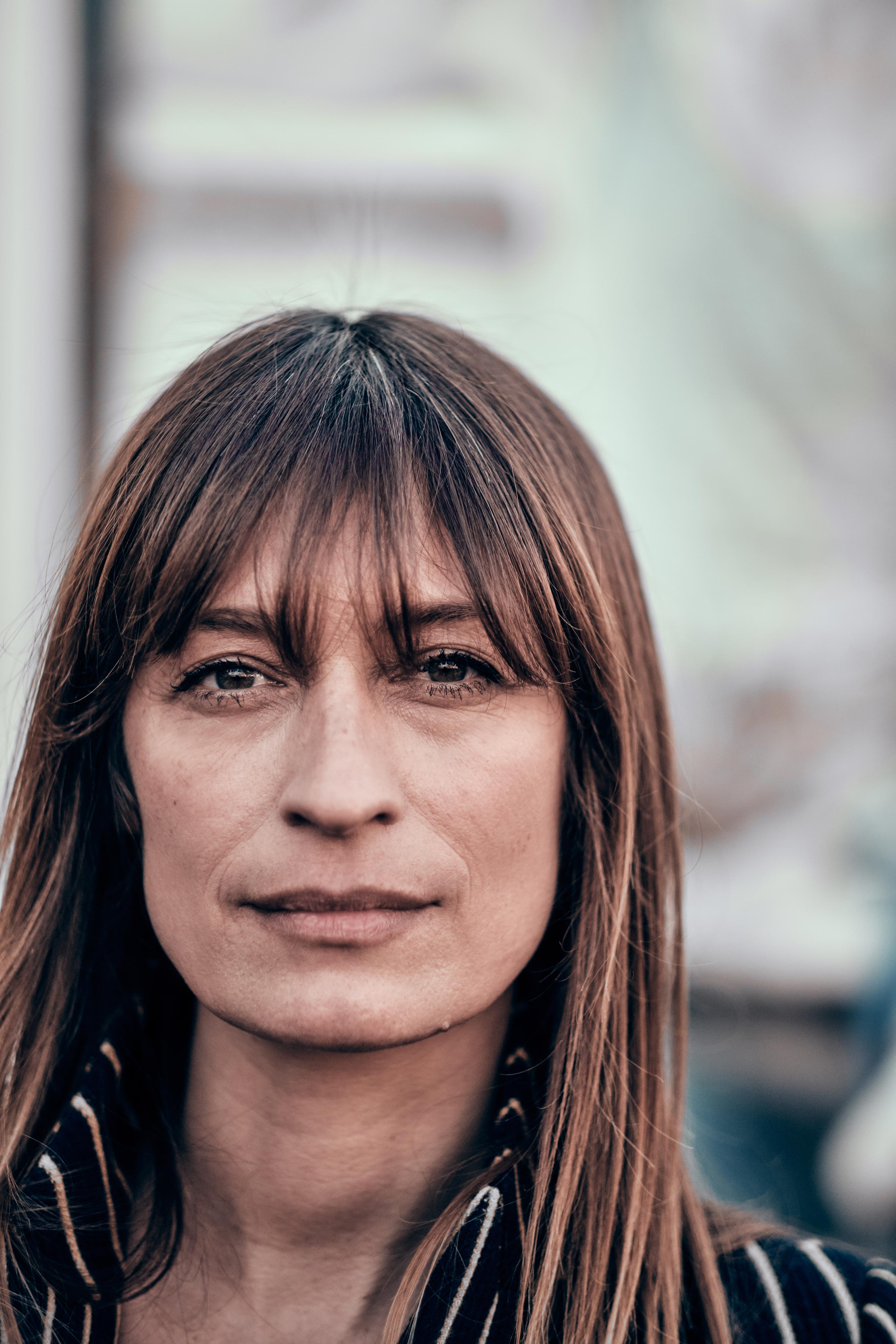
- Born: 18 February 1975 (age 50); Neuilly-sur-Seine, France
- Occupation: Model, music producer, author
- Children: 1

Caroline de Maigret (French pronunciation: [kaʁɔlin də mɛɡʁɛ], born 18 February 1975) is a French international model and music producer who is a member of the families of de Maigret and Poniatowski.

== Private life ==
The granddaughter of former minister Michel Poniatowski, Caroline de Maigret is the daughter of Bertrand de Maigret (former vice-president of the Council of Paris then deputy of Sarthe) and swimming champion Isabelle Poniatowski. She was raised in Paris with her three siblings. In 1993, she passed her baccalauréat in economic and social studies and enrolled at the Sorbonne in Modern Literature. The same year, she was spotted by a modelling agency. She is represented by SAFE Management

She met the musician Yarol Poupaud in 2004 during a concert. They were together until 2021. They have a son.

In 2006, alongside modelling, she created her music label - Bonus Tracks Records - with Yarol Poupaud.

== Career ==
=== Modeling ===
She started with Mario Testino in the magazine Glamour, and then participated in fashion shows for Chanel, Dior, Louis Vuitton, Balenciaga, Marc Jacobs, Hermès, Jil Sander, Lanvin, Valentino or Ann Demeulemeester, Dries van Noten, A.F. Vandevorst, Alexander McQueen, Hussein Chalayan, etc.

She has been photographed for French and international magazines (Vogue Brazil, Vogue Italia, Vogue UK, Numéro, i-D, Elle, Jalouse, Mixte) by (Steven Meisel, Peter Lindbergh, Jean-Baptiste Mondino, Bettina Rheims, Patrick Demarchelier, Karl Lagerfeld, Juergen Teller, Terry Richardson, Inez van Lamsweerde and Vinoodh Matadin, Mikael Jansson, Nathaniel Goldberg, Nathalie Alavoine, Carter Smith, Michel Earl, Arthur Elgort, Rankin).

She is the advertising face of several cosmetic brands, including Garnier, Oil of Olay, Pantene, and Evian Affinity.

in 2013, she was the face for the Prada Fall/Winter campaign photographed by Steven Meisel.

In 2014 she became the face of Lancôme.

She was the face for the Louis Vuitton Spring 2014 campaign, alongside Catherine Deneuve, Sofia Coppola and Giselle Bündchen, photographed by Steven Meisel.

While working with Chanel, she is described by Karl Lagerfeld as “an heiress from Saint-Germain-des-Prés, with a Parisian and intellectual side, without being mundane.”, a Parisian.

In november 2019, she appeared in Clara Luciani’s “Ma Soeur” music video.

She has been a Chanel ambassador since 2016.

=== Music ===
In 2006, de Maigret began producing music and created Bonus Tracks Records, a mainly rock music label with musician Yarol Poupaud.

Productions

1. 2021: Yarol, “Hot Like Dynamite”, Album
2. 2021: Victor Mechanick, “Singer”, Album
3. 2019: Yarol, “Yarol”, Album
4. 2012: "Black Minou", EP
5. 2011: The Parisians, Difficult Times
6. 2011: The Hub, A Sleepless Night
7. 2010: The Parisians, Shaking The Ashes Of Our Enemies
8. 2009: Les Brainbox, Siberia EP
9. 2009: Heartbreak Hotel, Snake Eyes
10. 2009: Bad Mama Dog, Love Gone Bad
11. 2008: Mister Soap and the Smiling Tomatoes, Hawaï EP
12. 2008: Yarol, 2003 Sessions
13. 2008: The Parisians, Alesia E.P.
14. 2008: The Mantis, Where Are You My Generation? E.P.
15. 2006: Adrienne Pauly, Adrienne Pauly (Directed for Warner Music)
16. 2006: Adanowsky, Étoile éternelle (Directed for Dreyfus Motors)
17. 2006: Paris Calling—(Second Sex, The Parisians, Plastiscines, Brooklyn, Les Shades, The Hellboys, The Rolls)
18. 2006: The Hellboys, Mutant Love

B.O. Productions:

- 2010: Bus Palladium by Christopher Thompson which was nominated for the Césars Awards in the “Best Soundtrack” category.
- 2009: La Musique de Papa, Patrick Grandperret, France 2
- 2008: Doom Doom, by Laurent Abitbol and Nicolas Mongin, Canal+

== Publications ==
- How to be Parisian, co-written with Anne Berest, Audrey Diwan and Sophie Mas, Random House, 2013.
- Older, But Better, But Older: The art of growing up, co-written with Sophie Mas, Anne Berest and Audrey Diwan, Doubleday, 2019.
