= Greta Varlese =

Italian fashion model (born 1998)

- Born: 21 August 1998 (age 28); Chiaravalle, Calabria, Italy
- Modeling information
- Height: 1.78 m (5 ft 10 in)
- Hair color: Brown
- Eye color: Green

Greta Varlese (born 21 August 1998) is an Italian fashion model. She was once ranked among the top 50 models in the world by models.com. Vogue has called her a "powerhouse".

== Early life ==
Varlese's mother is German, and her father is Italian. She never considered a serious modeling career before doing the Elite Model Look contest, as she was not interested in fashion.

== Career ==
Varlese was discovered by Elite Models during their Elite Model Look contest in China; although she didn't win, she made it to the top 10.

Just months later she debuted as a Givenchy exclusive in the F/W 2015 Men's Show, personally handpicked by Riccardo Tisci, which catapulted her career. In her first fashion show, she opened for Givenchy. She considers doing three Givenchy campaigns in a row her "greatest achievement".

In her first season she did 75 shows, including Prada, Chanel, Dior, and Versace; she opened Elie Saab, Kenzo, and Rag & Bone.

In 2016, she starred in campaigns for Belstaff x Liv Tyler, Prada, Vera Wang, McQ, Givenchy, Zara, and Valentino.

For the A/W 2017 season she did over 32 shows in one month.

She has appeared in Vogue Italia, Vogue Paris, Teen Vogue, W magazine, and British Vogue and she appeared on the cover of Harper's Bazaar UK, Japan, Korea and Kazakhstan.
