= Vittoria Ceretti =

Italian fashion model (born 1998)

- Ceretti in 2026
- Born: 7 June 1998 (age 28); Brescia, Lombardy, Italy
- Occupation: Model
- Years active: 2012–present
- Spouse: Matteo Milleri (m. 2020; div. 2023)
- Partner: Leonardo DiCaprio (2023–present)
- Modeling information
- Height: 5 ft 10 in (1.78 m)
- Hair color: Brown
- Eye color: Green
- Agency: The Society Management (New York); Elite Model Management (Paris, Milan, London, Amsterdam, Barcelona, Copenhagen); Model Management (Hamburg); MP Stockholm (Stockholm)

Vittoria Ceretti (born 7 June 1998) is an Italian fashion model. Ceretti was discovered in 2012 through the Elite Model Look Model contest. As of 2024, Ceretti has participated in 400 fashion shows and has appeared on the cover of Vogue and its international editions 24 times. As of 2025, Ceretti is one of the highest paid models of her generation.

== Early life ==
Ceretti was born in Brescia, Lombardy, Italy, in 1998. She is the daughter of Giuseppe Ceretti, the owner of a flooring company, and Francesca (née Lazzari), a housewife. When she was 14 years old, she entered the Elite Model Look competition in Italy, where she was chosen as a finalist.

== Career ==
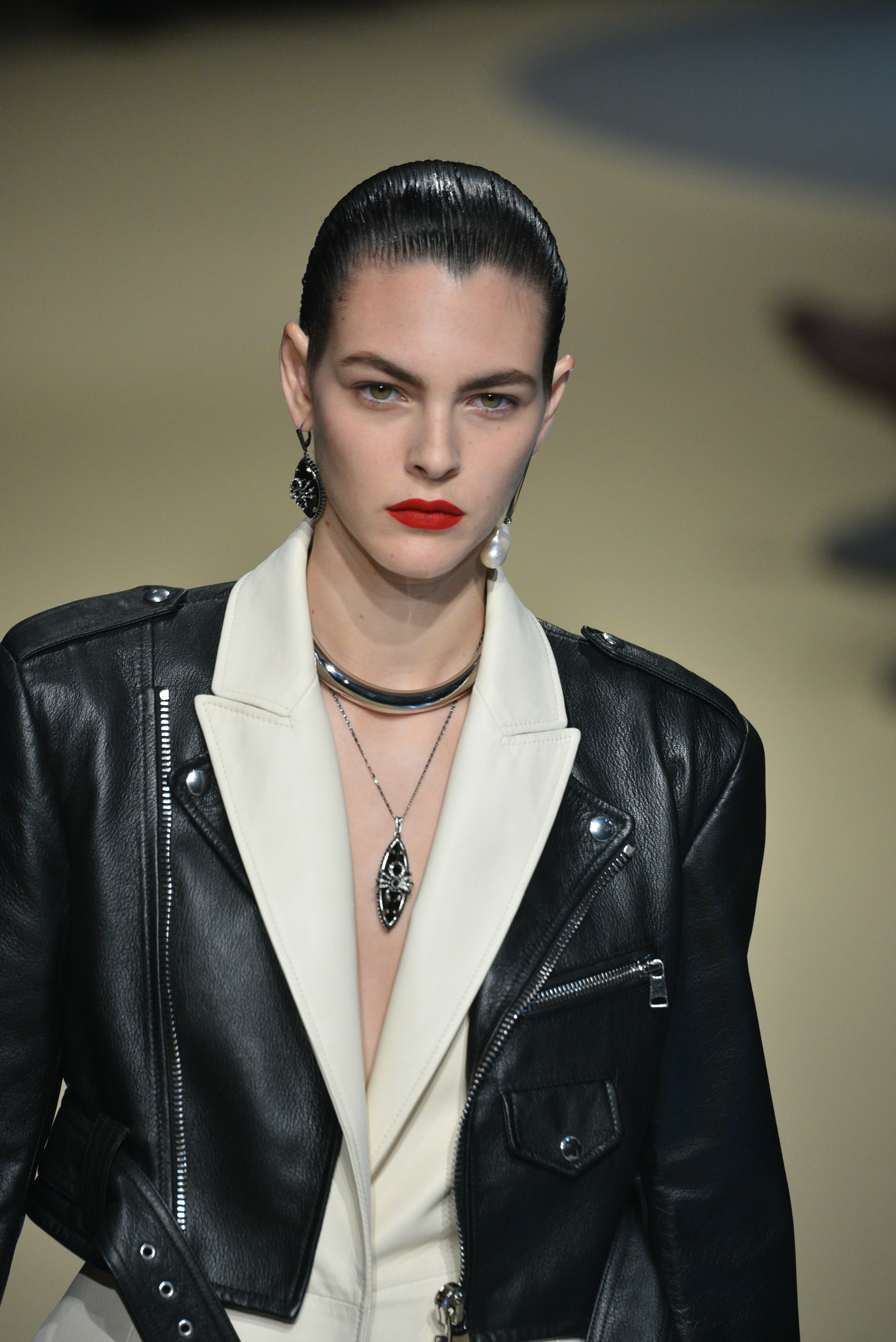
Vittoria Ceretti walking the runway for Alexander McQueen in 2018

=== 2012–2017: Early career ===
Ceretti began her modelling career at the age of 14 and earned a place among the finalists of Elite Model Look Italia. She made her runway debut in the Italian city of Milan, for the designer Kristina Ti.

In 2014, Ceretti was chosen by Dolce & Gabbana as the face of its Autumn/ Winter and Beauty campaigns in 2015 and 2016.

In 2015, Ceretti was selected to be the face of Armani's Autumn/Winter campaign. That same year, she was chosen as the face of Alexander McQueen's Spring/Summer 2017 campaign and appeared with Gigi and Bella Hadid in the Fendi Spring/Summer 2017 campaign.

In July 2016, Ceretti appeared on the cover of Vogue Italia shot by Steven Meisel, who also photographed her for a campaign for Prada. Ceretti was also part of the Givenchy campaign.

In 2017, Ceretti appeared on the covers of Vogue Japan in February, American Vogue in March, and Vogue France in May. That year, she was one of seven models on the cover of American Vogue's March 2017 issue, which celebrated the magazine's 125th anniversary.

=== 2018–present: Rise to prominence ===
After her breakthrough, Ceretti became a muse in the fashion industry. Dolce & Gabbana selected her for their beauty line. Karl Lagerfeld appreciated her for her versatility and chose her for Fendi and Chanel shows. In 2018, Ceretti appeared on the cover of British Vogue, completing the Big Four of the fashion industry. In 2018, she also was part of Tiffany's's campaign and Proenza Schouler's "Arizona Fragrance" campaign. The same year, she was chosen to be one of the faces of Chanel's Coco Neige campaign. According to Vogue Italia, Ceretti was the most searched model on its website in 2018. In 2019, she walked for Métiers d'Art show.

In 2023, Ceretti was the face of the Chanel Beauty Holiday Campaign. In 2024, she became the new face of Pucci. She participated in the 2026 Winter Olympics opening ceremony.

Ceretti has also appeared on the cover of Vogue Germany, Vogue Spain, Vogue Korea, Vogue China, Harper's Bazaar, Elle, Glamour, Grazia, and IO Donna.

== Personal life ==
In an interview for Vogue France, Ceretti said that she would have studied either acting or psychology if she had not begun a career as a model. Ceretti was married to Italian record producer Matteo Milleri, known professionally as Anyma, from 2020 to 2023.
