= Jing Wen =

Chinese fashion model (born 1993)

- 李静雯
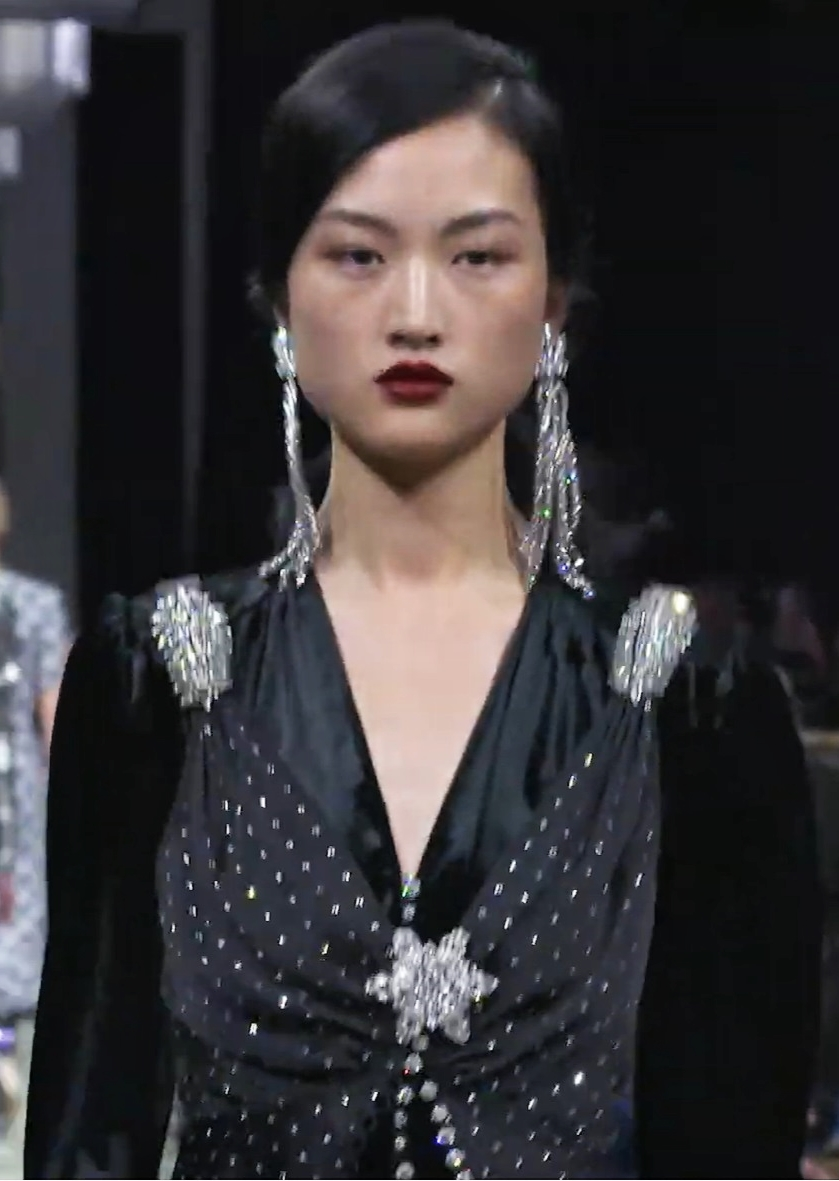
- Jing Wen walks at the Paco Rabanne Fall Winter 2019–20 show
- Born: Li Jingwen; 15 October 1993 (age 33); Guangzhou, Guangdong, China
- Modeling information
- Height: 178 cm (5 ft 10 in)
- Hair color: Black
- Eye color: Brown
- Agency: Women Management (New York, Paris, Milan); Elite Model Management (London); Uno Models (Barcelona); METRO Models (Zurich)

Li Jingwen (Chinese: 李静雯; pinyin: Lǐ Jìngwén; born 1993), professionally known as Jing Wen, is a Chinese fashion model. She is considered by Vogue as one of the top models from China. She is known for modeling for Prada. From July 2017 to 2020, she was ranked as one of the Top 50 models in the fashion industry by models.com. Currently, she is listed on models.com's Money Girls list. Jing Wen has been on the cover of Vogue Italia and Vogue China.

== Career ==
Jing Wen started her career by signing with a local Chinese agency then Supreme Model Management in New York. She is currently signed to Supreme's mother agency Women Management.

=== Advertising ===
In addition to Prada campaigns, she has modeled in advertisements for Calvin Klein, 7 For All Mankind Jeans, Dior, Topshop, Zara, Victoria Beckham, Tommy Hilfiger, Coach, Inc. and Salvatore Ferragamo among others. She also starred in an H&M beauty campaign.

=== Runway ===
Jing has walked for Louis Vuitton, Prada, Chanel, She has walked the runway for Dior, Chanel, Alexandre Vauthier, Elie Saab, Viktor & Rolf, J. Mendel, Giambattista Valli, Valentino, Proenza Schouler, Burberry, Roberto Cavalli, Marc Jacobs, and Marni, among many others. Models.com listed her as a "Top Newcomer" of the 2015 season.

=== Editorial ===
She has appeared in American Vogue, the cover of T: The New York Times Style Magazine, the cover of Vogue China twice, Teen Vogue, Love, the cover of Vogue Italia, Vogue Germany, and Numéro magazine among others.

== Personal life ==
Jing Wen is an amateur photographer; after modeling, she plans to be a restaurateur.
