= Steven Meisel =

American fashion photographer (born 1954)

- Born: June 5, 1954 (age 72); New York City, U.S.
- Education: High School of Art and Design
- Alma mater: Parsons School of Design
- Occupation: Fashion photographer

Steven Meisel (born June 5, 1954) is an American fashion photographer, who obtained popularity and critical acclaim with his work in Vogue and Vogue Italia as well as his photographs of friend Madonna in her 1992 book, Sex. He is now considered one of the most successful fashion photographers in the industry.

He worked regularly for American Vogue (from the 1990s to 2000s), British Vogue (under the editorship of Edward Enninful) and Italian Vogue (from the late 1980s to 2010s).

== Early life ==
Meisel was born in New York City in 1954, to a Jewish family. He studied at the High School of Art and Design, where he attended different courses but, as affirmed in an interview with Ingrid Sischy for Vogue France, he finally majored in fashion illustration.

From an early age, Meisel had a deep interest for fashion; he often preferred to sketch models while looking at fashion magazines rather than play with other things and soon enough attended the High School of Art and Design in New York City. Later, he was admitted at the Parsons School of Design, where he majored in fashion illustration and graduated.

== Career ==
One of his first jobs was for fashion designer Halston as an illustrator. Meisel taught illustration part-time at his alma mater, Parsons School of Design. Later on, while working at Women's Wear Daily as an illustrator, he went to Elite Model Management where Oscar Reyes, a booker who liked his illustrations, allowed him to take pictures of some of their models. In his spare time, Meisel would photograph models. One was future film star Phoebe Cates. She went to a casting for Seventeen magazine to show her portfolio, which held some of his photography, and the staff at Seventeen subsequently contacted Meisel and hired him.

Meisel worked for many different fashion magazines, most notably Interview and US and Italian Vogue. His first Vogue cover was for the August 1986 issue of the British edition. For almost three decades, he captured the photographs for each cover and main editorial spread in Italian Vogue. He also shot many of the covers for Anna Wintour's Vogue from the mid 90s to early 2000s. In 2014, he portrayed 50 models for the 50th anniversary of Vogue Italia. In March 2024 he photographed again another group this time of 40 personalities for Edward Enninful's final issue of British Vogue.

The July 2008 issue of Vogue Italia featured only black models, and was entirely photographed by Meisel. It was a response to increasing criticism of racism in the fashion industry and became the best-selling issue in the magazine's history. When asked about the issue, Meisel said: "Obviously I feel that fashion is totally racist. The one thing that taking pictures allows you to do is occasionally make a larger statement. After seeing all the shows though I feel it was totally ineffective. I was curious—because it received a lot of publicity—whether it would have any effect on New York, London, Paris, or Milan, and I found that it did not. They still only had one token black girl, maybe two. It’s the same as it always was and that’s the sad thing for me."

Meisel has contributed photos for the covers of several popular albums and singles, including two RIAA Diamond-certified albums, Madonna's 1984 album Like a Virgin and Mariah Carey's 1995 album Daydream. His work can be seen on the cover of Madonna's singles "Bad Girl" and "Fever", and Mariah Carey's single "Fantasy" (simply a different crop of the photo on the cover of the Daydream album). He also directed the music video for Deborah Harry's single "Sweet and Low" alongside fashion designer Stephen Sprouse.

=== Fashion campaigns ===
Meisel has shot for Versace, Valentino, Dolce & Gabbana, Balenciaga, Loewe, Calvin Klein, Alberta Ferretti, and Barneys New York. Since 2004 to 2016, Meisel has shot Prada campaigns each season. Then he moved to Zara. In May 2008, he shot Madonna for the cover of Vanity Fair, and later that year he shot her for the 2009 spring campaign by Louis Vuitton.

He is a close friend of designer Anna Sui, for whom he has also shot several campaigns, even though Sui rarely uses advertising to promote her clothing.

=== Influence ===
As one of the most recognised photographers in the fashion industry, Meisel is attributed to unearthing or promoting the careers of many successful models over the last 40 years, including Linda Evangelista, Guinevere Van Seenus, Karen Elson, Amber Valletta, Kristen McMenamy, Stella Tennant, Raquel Zimmermann, Saskia de Brauw, Sasha Pivovarova, Jessica Stam, Naomi Campbell, Christy Turlington, Lexi Boling, Iris Strubegger, Lara Stone, Coco Rocha, Natalia Vodianova, Vanessa Axente, Lindsey Wixson, Elise Crombez, Doutzen Kroes and Snejana Onopka.

=== Controversies ===
Meisel's work often addresses social issues such as racism, addiction, and cultural self-absorption, and the photographer has a history of controversial photoshoots. One example includes an editorial in 2007, where he depicted models in designer outfits being harassed by soldiers, drawing inspiration from the Iraq war. The images were deemed as glamorizing violence and rape. A 2010 article by The Guardian noted that Meisel "clearly considers himself a bit of a provocateur" and questioned his sense of taste and appropriateness. He frequently satirizes the mannerisms and extravagance of the fashion world. One example is the editorial "Makeover Madness," which spanned eighty pages in Vogue Italia in 2005 and depicted models undergoing various body interventions, dressed in couture but wrapped in gauze. Other photoshoots by Meisel have also been met with criticism. In a July 2006 issue of Vogue Italia, he created a controversial photoshoot described as "a fun take on rehab chic". A September 2006 photoshoot for the magazine, entitled "State of Emergency", was also criticized for eroticizing torture and police brutality.

=== Books and exhibitions ===
In 1992, Meisel collaborated with Madonna to develop the controversial book Sex.

A book collecting some of his photographs, titled Steven Meisel, was published by German teNeues Buchverlag in 2003 and sold out.

In 2014–2015, Phillips held an exhibition called "Role Play" that featured some of the photographic work of Meisel throughout the years, and which took place in the cities of Paris, London, New York, and Miami.

In April 2023, it was announced that a new book showcasing the collaborations between Meisel and his longtime muse Linda Evangelista, titled Linda Evangelista Photographed by Steven Meisel, would be released in September 2023 by Phaidon Press.

== Personal life ==
Meisel is known for being a private figure and rarely gives interviews.
