= Miu Miu =

Italian fashion house

- Type: Subsidiary
- Industry: Fashion
- Founded: 1993; 33 years ago in Italy
- Founders: Miuccia Prada
- Headquarters: Milan, Italy
- Products: Luxury goods
- Revenue: ▲€753 million (2023)
- Parent: Prada
- Website: www.miumiu.com

Miu Miu is an Italian high fashion women's clothing and accessory brand and a fully owned subsidiary of Prada. It is headed by Miuccia Prada and headquartered in Milan, Italy. Silvia Onofri is its CEO.

== History ==
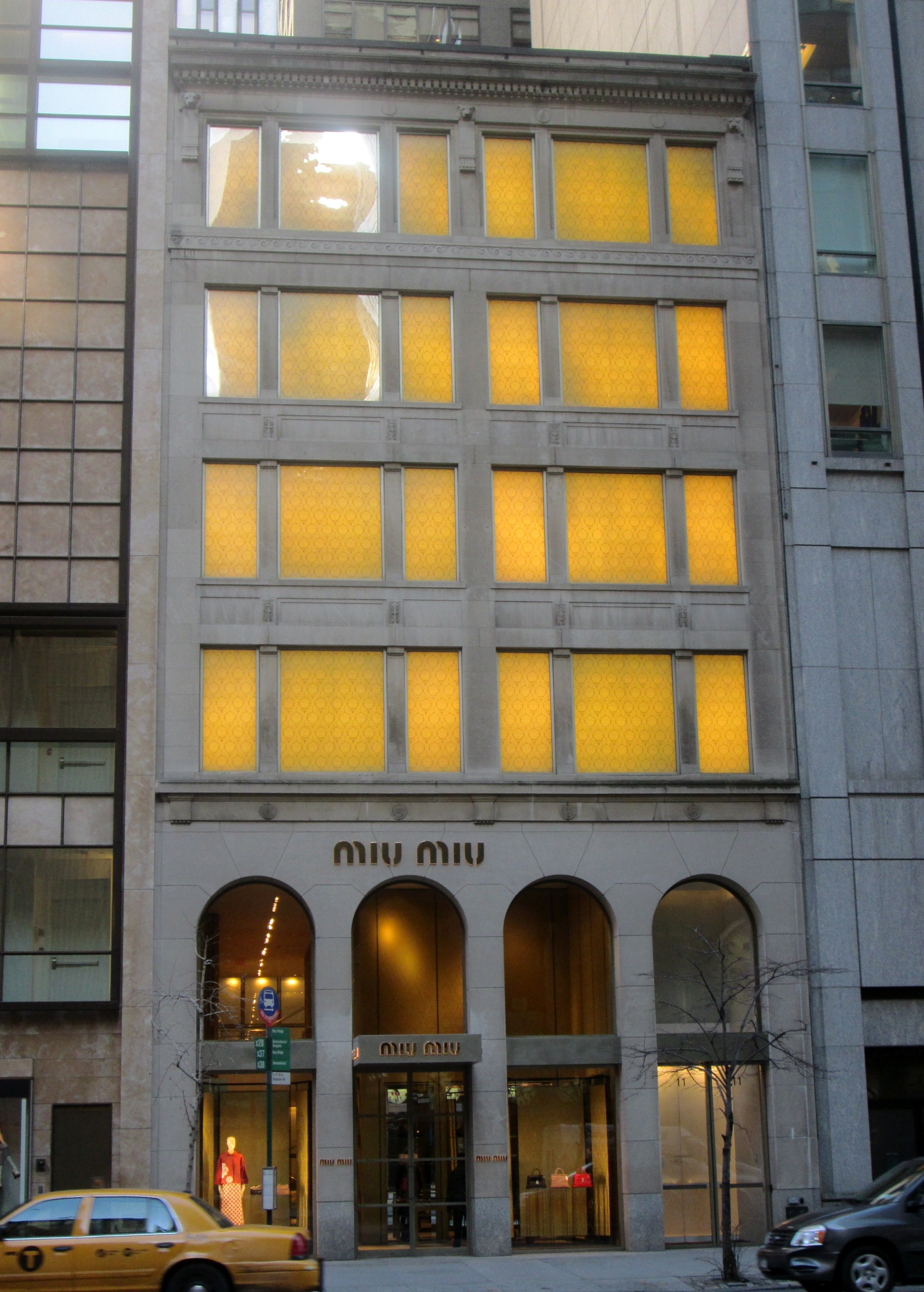
Miu Miu store in New York City

Miu Miu was established in 1992 by Miuccia Prada. The name was conceived from Miuccia Prada's family nickname. It was publicly launched in 1993, with a cowgirl-themed collection of fringed suede jackets and patchwork prairie skirts. Starting in 1994, the brand showed its collections in the US for three seasons. It first showed a womenswear collection during Paris Fashion Week in 2006.

By 2005, Prada worked on distinguishing Miu Miu by setting up a separate showroom for the brand in an Art Nouveau villa that served as Prada’s first Milan headquarters, and using that same location for the men’s fall-winter show in 2006.

In 2020, Miu Miu introduced Upcycled by Miu Miu, a limited collection of vintage dresses from the 1930s through the 1980s that have been tweaked and refashioned. The collection continues to be a major focus for the brand today.

Miu Miu’s Spring 2024 show was chosen as the 'best of the year' at the Impression Awards 2024. In the 2020s, Miu Miu has experienced a renewed interest from younger customers; full year sales figures for 2023 showed an increase of 82% year-over-year.

== Other activities ==
Under an agreement made with Prada, the production and global distribution of Miu Miu's prescription frames and sunglasses have been licensed to Luxottica since 2003.

Backed by a 2013 agreement, between Coty and Prada, Miu Miu launched its first fragrance in 2015, marking the first time the brand expanded outside the fashion and accessories markets.

== Boutiques ==
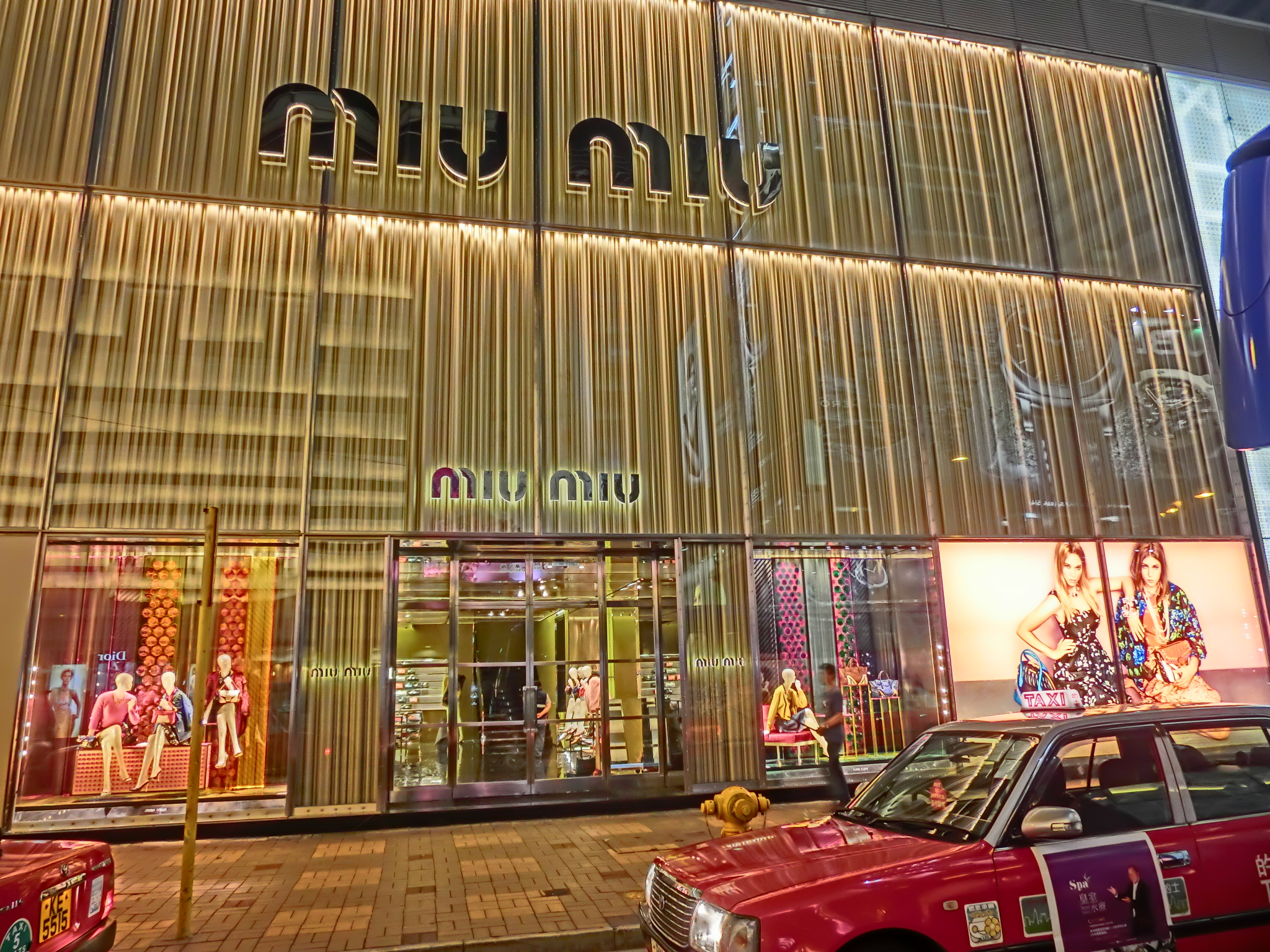
Miu Miu store in Hong Kong

There are Miu Miu boutiques located on a global scale. Architect Roberto Baciocchi developed the blueprint for an early series of stores, which was first applied to the Milan store in 2006. He also created the interiors for Miu Miu stores in Paris, Hong Kong, Florence, London, New York and Taipei.

Miu Miu opened its first independent store in China in The Mixc in Shenzhen in 2009. A new North American store was launched in Houston, Texas, in The Galleria during the summer of 2011 and in Short Hills, New Jersey, in the fall of 2011. Miu Miu also opened their first Australian boutique at Chadstone Shopping Centre in Melbourne. A branch opened in Glasgow, Scotland, in 2010 and is situated in the Fraser's department store. A store designed by Herzog & de Meuron opened in the Aoyama district of Tokyo in 2015.

In 2017, the Miu Miu Sloane Street store in London reopened after a refurbishment, and announced that they would be starting a customisation service to allow customers to design their own heels. It is the only Miu Miu store in the world to offer this service. In 2025, Miu Miu reopened in London with a 7,500 square feet store at 150 New Bond Street and the announcement that Prada Holding would purchase the building for an estimated GBP £250 million.

== Advertising ==
For its advertising campaigns, Miu Miu has been working with renowned photographers including Juergen Teller (1996), Glen Luchford (1996–1998), John Akehurst (1998), Norbert Schoerner (1999), Mario Testino (2003), Inez and Vinoodh (2006–2007, 2014), Bruce Weber (2011), Mert Alas and Marcus Piggott (2012), Alasdair McLellan (2017) and Steven Meisel (2023–2024).

Spokes-models for the brand have included Laetitia Casta, Kirsten Dunst, Maggie Gyllenhaal, Katie Holmes, Ginta Lapina, Lindsay Lohan, Vanessa Paradis, Chloë Sevigny, Siri Tollerod, Lindsey Wixson, Zhou Xun, Dong Jie, Jessica Stam and Joan Smalls. In May 2011, Miu Miu appointed the (then only fourteen-year-old) actress Hailee Steinfeld to be the new younger face of the brand. For the 2012 campaign, a 34-year-old, U.S. model Guinevere Van Seenus was chosen. In 2018, actress Elle Fanning became the face of the brand. In October 2021, South Korean singer and actress Im Yoon-ah was selected as a brand ambassador. The next month, South Korean singer Jang Won-young was announced as a brand ambassador. In June 2023, Japanese singer and dancer Momo Hirai was selected as the brand's Japanese ambassador. In August 2023, (G)I-dle’s Minnie was chosen as a new House Ambassador for Miu Miu.

In 2011, Miu Miu launched the Women's Tales series. The campaign consisted of short films that were produced in conjunction with high-profile female directors. The outcome was a list of short, silent films that featured Miu Miu's collections. The first four short films were directed by Zoe Cassavetes, Lucrecia Martel, Giada Colagrande and Massy Tadjedin and were screened at the 69th Venice International Film Festival. A fifth film that debuted in 2013 was written and directed by Ava DuVernay, who also starred in the film.

In 2015, the UK’s Advertising Standards Authority banned a Miu Miu ad with actress Mia Goth that ran in British Vogue, after having received a complaint that Goth (then 22) looked underage because she wore "minimal make up". MiuMiu stated that Goth wore a "sophisticated outfit, without a low neck-line, and nude make up" and Vogue defended the ad as sophisticated and noted they had received no complaints from readers. The decision was widely criticised with Dazed calling the decision "simply not good enough" and "a disservice".

== Recent developments ==
Miu Miu has experienced remarkable growth, especially among the younger consumers, as a "youthful-leaning sister brand" of Prada. In 2024, the brand's revenues increased by 105% in the third quarter and 97% in the first nine months. Overall, Prada Group's revenues rose 10% during the same period. Miu Miu was recognized for a 93% sales increase in the first half of 2024. CEO Andrea Guerra mentioned the brand's focus on enhancing its identity and expanding retail presence to sustain this.

Growth slowed in 2026: Miu Miu's retail sales fell 3% at constant exchange rates in the third quarter, against a 29% increase in the same quarter of 2025. Over the first nine months of 2026, retail sales rose 1% to €1.15 billion, compared with growth of 41% in the same period a year earlier. Guerra attributed part of the slowdown to weaker demand in some Asian markets, where the brand has a larger share of its sales than Prada.
