= Francesco Scognamiglio =

Italian fashion designer

- Born: 26 June 1975 (age 50); Pompei, Italy
- Occupation: Fashion designer

Francesco Scognamiglio (born 26 June 1975) is an Italian fashion designer and businessman.

== Biography ==
Born in Pompei, the son of a lawyer, Scognamiglio studied at the Istituto Europeo del Design in Naples. After working for Versace, in 1998 he opened his first boutique in his hometown, and in 2000 he made his haute couture debut with a collection presented at Palazzo Barberini in Rome.

In 2009, Scognamiglio launched the male brand Allegri, and in 2013 he founded the Maison Francesco Scognamiglio. In 2021, he sold his brands Francesco Scognamiglio and Maison Francesco Scognamiglio to Y Capital Management and started the haute couture and ready-to-wear brand Monogram. In 2025, he regained ownership of his name-bearing brands.

Celebrities dressed by Scognamiglio include Madonna, Lady Gaga, Rihanna, Beyoncé, Miley Cyrus, Nicole Kidman, Jennifer Lopez, Diane Keaton, Emma Watson, Nicki Minaj, Bjork, Tilda Swinton, Cate Blanchett, Kylie Minogue, Courtney Love, Paris Hilton, Ornella Muti, Zendaya.
