= Giambattista Valli =

Italian fashion designer (born 1966)

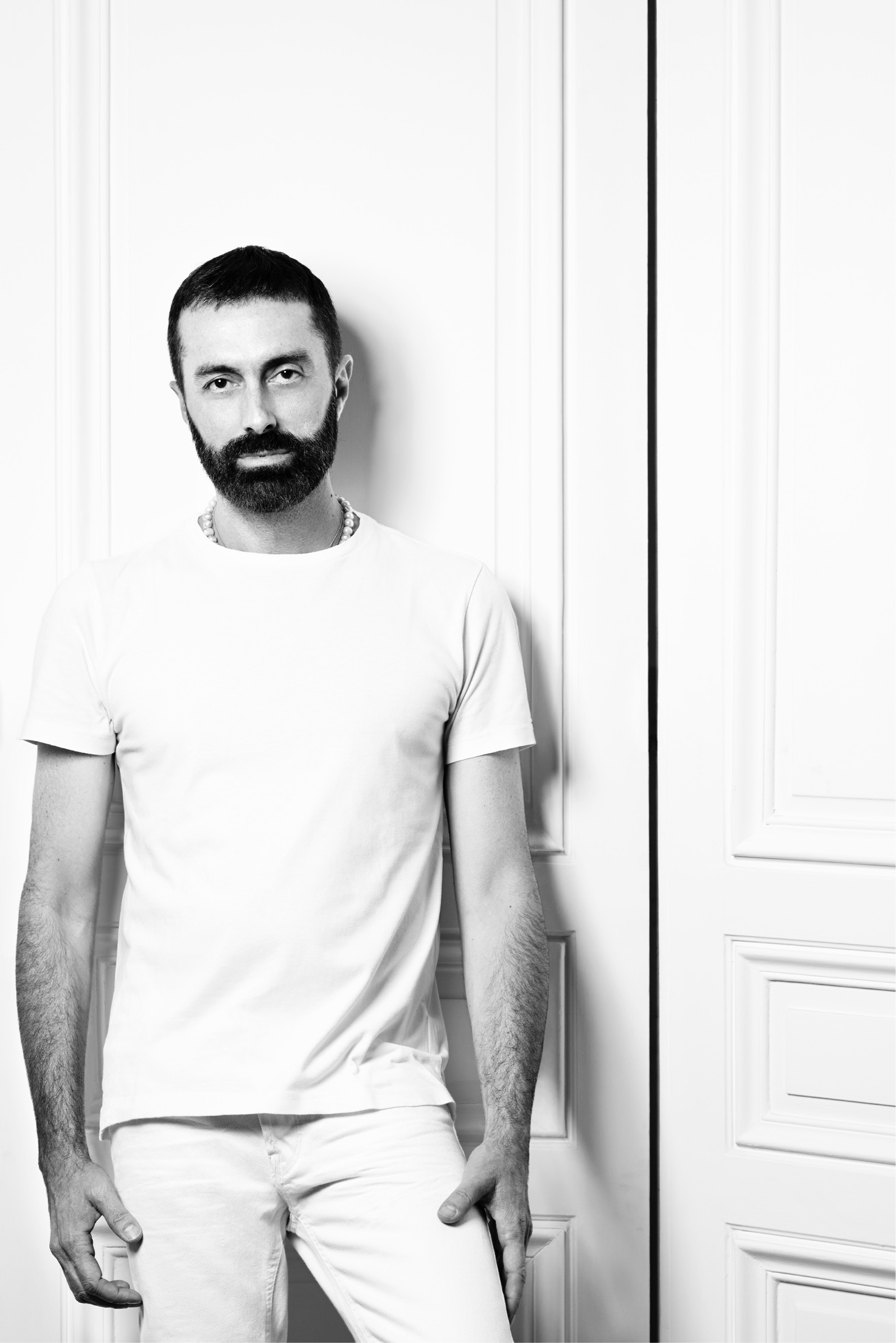
- Valli in 2018
- Born: June 27, 1966 (age 60); Rome, Italy
- Education: Art degree
- Occupation: Fashion designer
- Known for: Shows four times a year during Paris Fashion Week

Giambattista Valli is an Italian fashion designer who has been operating his eponymous fashion brand in Paris since 2004. His collections, both ready to wear and Haute couture, are presented semi-annually during Paris Fashion Week.

== Early life ==
Born and raised in Rome, Valli completed studies at a liceo (an Italian secondary school) and then earned a degree in art. In 1987 he began a foundation course in illustration at Central Saint Martins College of Art and Design in London.

== Career ==
=== Early career ===
After stints at Roberto Capucci (1986–1990), Fendi (1990–1995) and Krizia (1995–1996), Valli moved to Paris and worked as creative director for Emanuel Ungaro from 1998 to 2004. Ungaro credited Valli with revitalizing the house, and named him as his successor when he retired in 2004. Shortly after, the Ferragamo family, which owned Ungaro, dismissed him during an internal struggle.

=== Giambattista Valli ===
Valli launched his eponymous brand in 2004, heralding his first ready-to-wear show in Paris in 2005 where he had moved from Italy. Valli shows both ready-to-wear and haute couture collections semiannually in Paris. Valli is one of the few non-French designers granted membership into the historic Chambre Syndicate de la Haute Couture. He showed his first couture collection in July 2011.

Since 2005, Giambattista Valli has collaborated with MAC Cosmetics. For the production and distribution of its ready-to-wear collection, the brand entered into licensing agreements with Gilmar (2004–2009) and Mariella Burani Fashion Group (2009–2010) By 2012, Valli's ready-to-wear, couture and collaborations generated an estimated $80 million in sales annually. With the expiration of a contract with Italian fur-maker Ciwifurs for the brand’s own fur coats and jackets, Valli brought all production and distribution in-house in 2017.

Since 2014, the Giambattista Valli headquarters have been located in a historic building on Rue Boissy d'Anglas in the 8th arrondissement of Paris, designed by Luigi Scialanga, which also houses the brand's main store. The brand has flagship stores in Paris, London, Milan, Saint Tropez, Doha, Seoul and Beijing, and the brand's international distribution includes more than 245 selling points.

Groupe Artémis took a minority shareholding in the Giambattista Valli brand in 2017, later assuming majority control in 2021. In 2026, Valli reached an agreement to acquire full ownership of the Giambattista Valli brand from Artémis.

=== Other brands ===
In 2014, Valli launched Giamba, a new, younger sister ready-to-wear line, with a runway show in Milan.

In late 2014, Valli designed a spring collection for 7 for All Mankind.

From 2008 to 2017, Valli was Creative Director of Moncler Gamme Rouge, designing activewear for the brand, with a focus on women’s puffer jackets. Immediately after, the Giambattista Valli brand launched its 2017 activewear capsule collection, including coats, puffer jackets, sweatshirts and track suits.

In 2019, Valli released a capsule collection for men and women with H&M, his first foray into designing menswear.

In 2022, Valli teamed up with Moda Operandi for a line of tableware realized with artisans including Augarten Wien, a Viennese porcelain house founded in 1718.

== Recognition ==
Valli is the recipient of a Star Honoree Award from Fashion Group International in 2011 as well as Best Designer of the Year Awards from Elle China in 2013 and from Marie Claire Spain in 2015. In 2025, he was decorated as an Officer of France's Order of Arts and Letters.

== Clients ==
Valli designs have been worn by actresses, models, and royalty including Sarah Jessica Parker, Sonam Kapoor, Hilary Swank, Demi Moore, Ariana Grande, Penélope Cruz, Reese Witherspoon, Naomi Campbell, Mary Kate Olsen, Doutzen Kroes, Iman, Queen Rania of Jordan, Sofia Carson Jelena Karleuša, Clotilde Courau, Rihanna, Anya Taylor-Joy, Kendall Jenner and Gwyneth Paltrow. He designed wedding dresses for Jessica Biel (2012), Amal Clooney (2014), and Charlotte Casiraghi (2019).
