= Jill Stuart =

American fashion designer

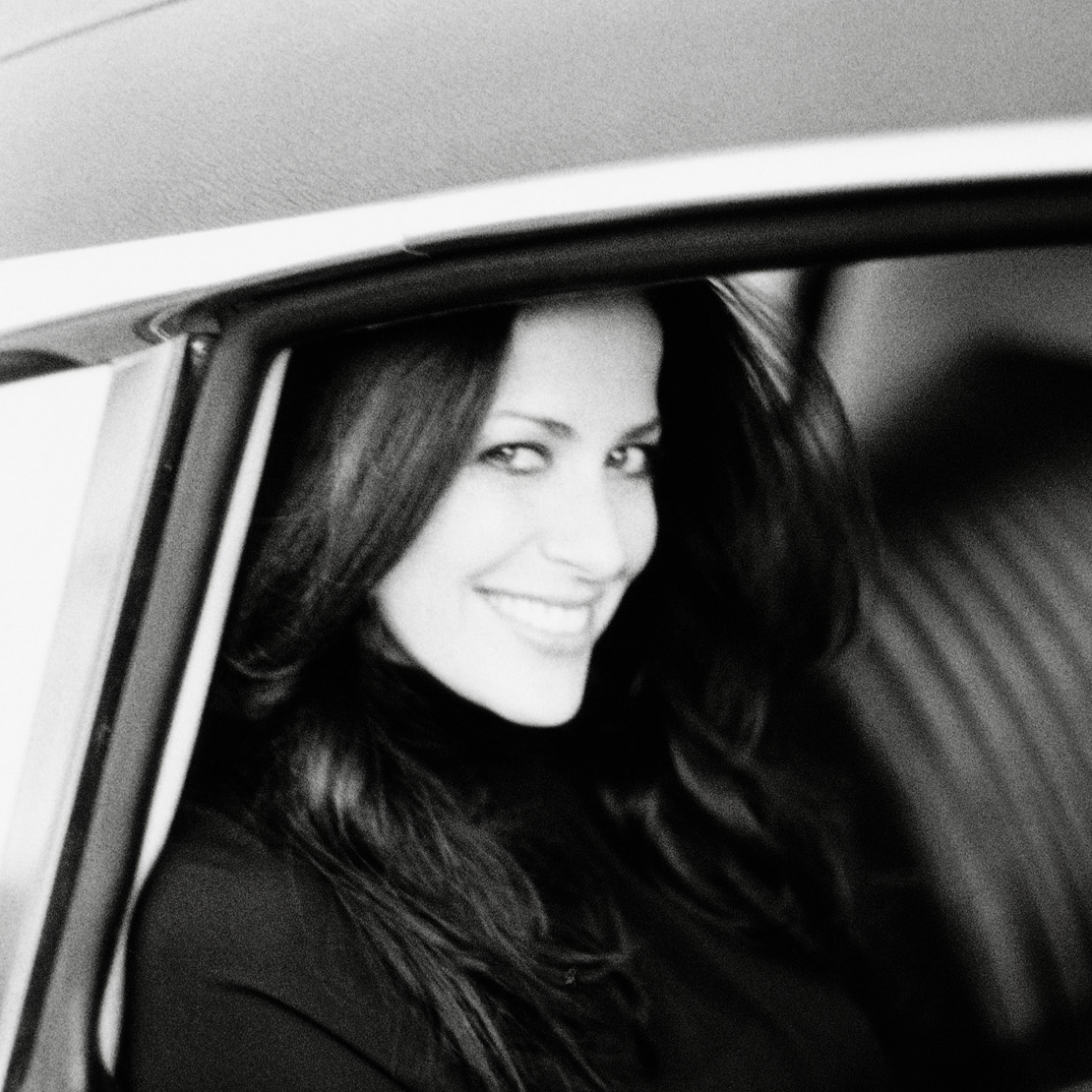
- Born: 1965 (age 60–61); New York City, US
- Education: Dalton School; Rhode Island School of Design
- Occupations: Businesswoman, fashion designer
- Labels: Jill Stuart; Jill Stuart Beauty; Jill by Jill Stuart (Japan and Korea); Jill Jill Stuart (US)
- Children: 3

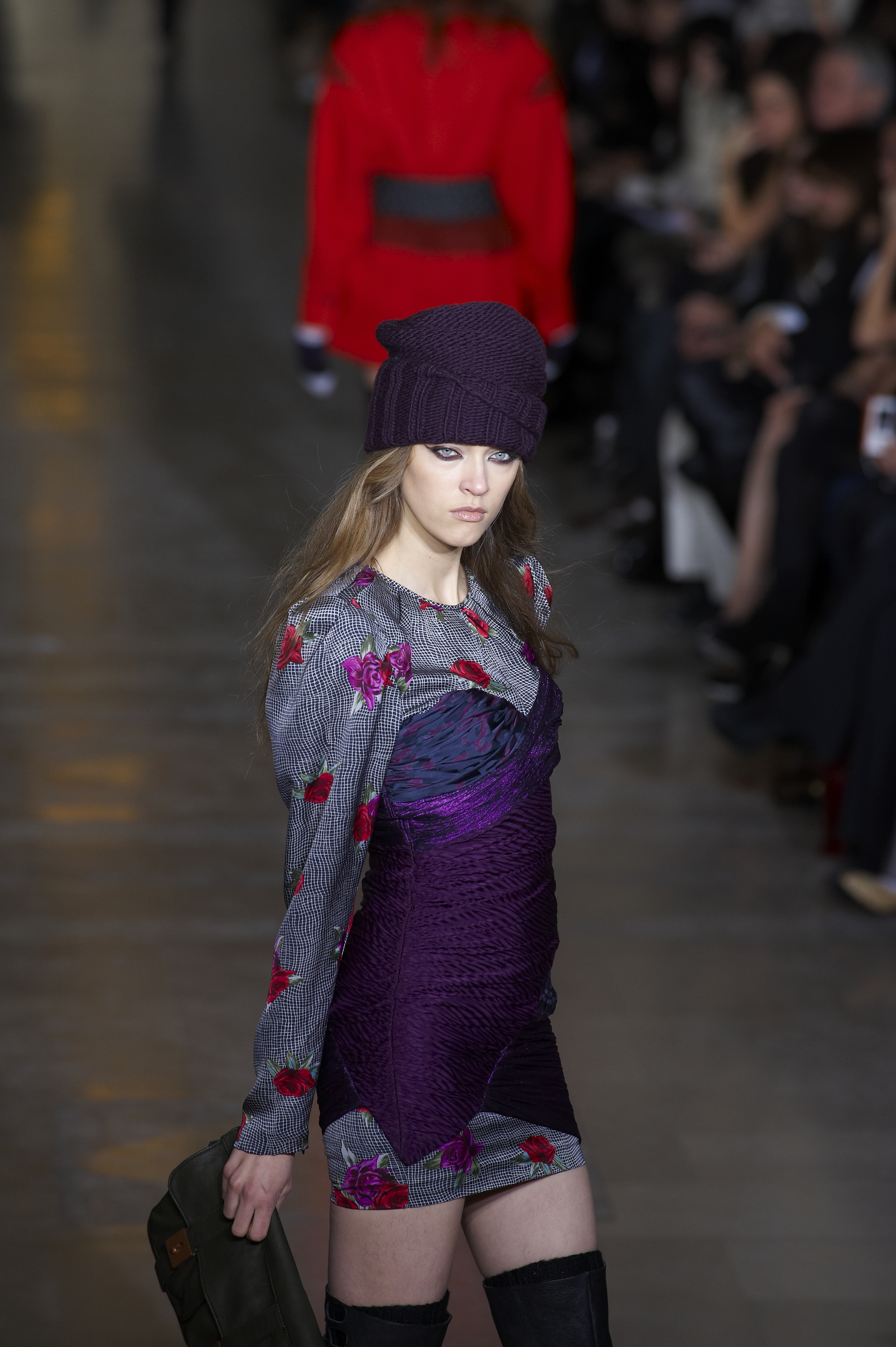
Jill Stuart Fall-Winter 2010 show at New York Fashion Week

Jill Stuart (born 1965) is an American businesswoman and fashion designer based in New York City, where she has been operating since 1988. She established her eponymous label in 1993, which is also popular in Asia.

== Early life ==
Stuart was born in New York City in 1965. Her parents George and Lynn Stuart worked in Manhattan's Garment District and created the label Mister Pants, which was an early creator of women's tailored trousers and trouser suits in men's fabrics. Lynn Stuart also had her own higher end label, and became known for creating outfits for actresses including Lucille Ball, Natalie Wood, and Sheila MacRae.

Stuart attended Manhattan's Dalton School and later Rhode Island School of Design.

== Career ==
Stuart's career began early, having sold her first collection of fashion sets to Bloomingdale's by the age of 15 – suede hobo bags and silver and leather chokers. In 1988, her fashion entrepreneurship career took off as she established her first store, a fashion boutique located on the Upper East Side focusing on accessories such as belts and handbags. By 1990, her stoles, bags and fur accessories could be found in stores such as Neiman Marcus and Bergdorf Goodman.

=== Launch of Jill Stuart ===
Her eponymous label was launched in 1993 and included Skinclothes – a range of leather garments, such as slip dresses, kilts, jeans and jackets. Items from her collection appeared in the 1995 movie Clueless. The following year, Stuart's designs were stocked by Bloomingdale's stores in the US.

From the mid 1990s, Stuart began opening stores in Japan, including branches in Tokyo, Osaka and Kobe, and concessions in some 70 outlets across the country. In 2006, the brand began operating in South Korea. In 2007, Lindsay Lohan was photographed by Mario Sorrenti as the face of the brand in Japan, becoming the subject of some controversy.

As of 2013, the brand is reported to have annual sales of around $30 million in the US, plus Asian sales of nearly $100 million. Customers include Hilary Swank, Kate Bosworth and Leighton Meester.

=== Other labels ===
In 2005, Stuart and Kosé launched Jill Stuart Beauty, which only operated in Asia until 2018. In 2007, she launched Jill by Jill Stuart, now only available in Japan and South Korea. In 2010, she started Jill Jill Stuart, a more affordable dress collection.

== Artistry ==
Stuart is known for her feminine, dress-centric collections. Vogue praised her "90s micro-florals and ruffled party dresses".

== Family ==
Stuart lives in SoHo, New York. She married Ron Curtis, a film producer, and had three daughters. Her eldest daughter, Morgan Curtis, established the Morgan Lane brand of sleepwear and lingerie in 2012 after working for Stuart. She had divorced Curtis.
