= List of people on the cover of i-D magazine =

This is a list of people who have appeared on the cover of i-D magazine from 1980 to the present:

== 1980s ==
Issue	Cover model	Photographer
#1. 1980	no cover model	Terry Jones
#2. 1980	no cover model	Terry Jones
#3. 1981	no cover model	Terry Jones
#4. 1981	no cover model	Terry Jones
#5. 1981	no cover model	Malcolm Garrett
#6. 1981	no cover model	Thomas Degen
#7. 1982	unidentified model	
#8. 1982	unidentified model	Thomas Degen
#9. 1982	unidentified model	
#10. 1982	Moira Bogue	Steve Johnston
#11. 1983	Fiona Skinner	Steve Johnston
#12. 1983	unidentified model	James Palmer
#13. 1983	LA (Lowri-Ann) Richards	Steve Johnston
#14. 1984	Sade Adu	Nick Knight
#15. March/April 1984	Madonna	Mark Lebon
#16. May/June 1984	Sophie Hicks	David Bailey
#17. July/August 1984	Jo Kelly	Mark Lebon
#18. September 1984	Sherron Waugh	Nick Knight
#19. October 1984	Anne Pigalle	Nick Knight
#20. November 1984	Jane Kahn	Monica Curtain
#21. December 1984/January 1985	Mary Emma	Mario Testino
#22. February 1985	unidentified model	Nick Knight
#23. March 1985	Carroll Thompson	Eamonn J. McCabe
#24. April 1985	Katie Westbrook	Nick Knight
#25. May 1985	Patsy Kensit	Mark Lebon
#26. June 1985	Elissa Karin	Martin Brading
#27. July 1985	Kathy Kanada	Robert Erdmann
#28. August 1985	Lizzie Tier	Nick Knight
#29. September 1985	Caryl Dolores	Nick Knight
#30. October 1985	Jeny Howorth	Mark Lebon
#31. November 1985	Blair Booth	Eamonn J. McCabe
#32. December 1985/January 1986	Kate van Z	Nick Knight
#33. February 1986	Corinne Drewery	Nick Knight
#34. March 1986	Scarlett Cannon	Mark Lebon
#35. April 1986	Akure Wall	Robert Erdmann
#36. May 1986	Alice Temple	Nick Knight
#37. June 1986	June Montana	Robert Erdmann
#38. July 1986	Ann Scott	Nick Knight
#39. August 1986	Naomi Campbell	Nick Knight
#40. September 1986	Amanda King	Nick Knight
#41. October 1986	Muriel Gray	Nick Knight
#42. November 1986	Angie Hill	Nick Knight
#43. December 1986/January 1987	Mickey as Betty Boop	Robert Erdmann
#44. February 1987	Paula Thomas	Jamie Long
#45. March 1987	Isabella Rossellini	Fabrizio Ferri
#46. April 1987	Grace Jones	Nick Knight
#47. May 1987	unidentified model	Nick Knight
#48. June 1987	Leigh Bowery	Johnny Rozsa
#49. July 1987	Elizabeth Westwood	Nick Knight
#50. August 1987	Sara Stockbridge	Nick Knight
#51. September 1987	Rachel Weisz	Kevin Davies
#52. October 1987	Alice Walpole	Mark Lebon
#53. November 1987	Mariko Mori	Kevin Davies
#54. December 1987/January 1988	no cover model	Terry Jones
#55. February 1988	unidentified model	Terry Jones
#56. March 1988	Silvia Ros	Willy Biondan
#57. April 1988	no cover model	Judy Blame
#58. May 1988	Wendy James	Wayne Stambler
#59. June 1988	Karen Louise Freeman’’Kar-man Messinjah	Wayne Stambler
#60. July 1988	no cover model	Terry Jones
#61. August 1988	Tamara Dobson	Norman Watson
#62. September 1988	unidentified model	Mark Lebon
#63. October 1988	no cover model	
#64. November 1988	La Camilla	Guido Hildebrand
#65. December 1988	unidentified model	Eddie Monsoon
#66. January/February 1989	Lisa Stansfield	Phil Inkelberghe
#67. March 1989	unidentified model	Philip Sinden
#68. April 1989	unidentified model	Nick Knight
#69. May 1989	unidentified model	Eddie Monsoon
#70. June 1989	Drena	Eddie Monsoon
#71. July 1989	Kayla	Angus Ross
#72. August 1989	Pam Hogg	Kevin Davies
#73. September 1989	Diana Brown	Normski
#74. October 1989	Liza Minnelli	Mark Lebon
#75. November 1989	Judith (Jude) Evans	Kevin Davies
#76. December 1989/January 1990	Queen B	Nick Knight

== 1990s ==
Issue	Cover model	Photographer
#77. February 1990	Billie Ray Martin	Mark Lebon
#78. March 1990	Victoria Wilson-James	Mark Lebon
#79. April 1990	unidentified models	Nick Knight; Craig McDean; Mark Mann
#80. May 1990	Marni	Jean-Baptiste Mondino
#81. June 1990	Jas	Brett Dee
#82. July 1990	Kirsten Owen	Paolo Roversi
#83. August 1990	Christy Turlington	Andrew Macpherson
#84. September 1990	Tasmin & Kerry Shaw	Nick Knight
#85. October 1990	Lady Miss Kier	Nick Knight
#86. November 1990	Mica Paris	Craig McDean
#87. December 1990	Aure Atika	Nigel Shafran
#88. January 1991	Sophie Okonedo	Xajer Guardians
#89. February 1991	Michelle Legare	Mark Lebon
#90. March 1991	Kylie Minogue	Robert Erdmann
#91. April 1991	Moni	Derek Ridgers
#92. May 1991	Sister Souljah	
#93. June 1991	Adeva	Andrew Macpherson
#94. July 1991	Lorraine Pascale	Hugh Stewart
#95. August 1991	Elaine Irwin	Mark Lebon
#96. September 1991	Michelle Geddes	Eddie Monsoon
#97. October 1991	Rozalla	Hugh Stewart
#98. November 1991	Sandra Bernhard	Michel Comte
#99. December 1991	Zoe	Terry Jones
#100. January 1992	Neneh Cherry	Mark Lebon
#101. February 1992	Christie	Simon Martin
#102. March 1992	unidentified models	Takashi Homma
#103. April 1992	N'Dea Davenport	Nick Knight
#104. May 1992	Helena Christensen	Herrik Bulow
#105. June 1992	Kathy Read	Craig McDean
#106. July 1992	Sarah Wietzel	Nick Knight
#107. August 1992	Béatrice Dalle	Craig McDean
#108. September 1992	Nora Kryst	Eddie Monsoon
#109. October 1992	Cecilia Chancellor	Simon Fleury
#110. November 1992	Holly Davis	Simon Fleury
#111. December 1992	Nova	Sivan Lewin
#112. January 1993	Sonic the Hedgehog	—
#113. February 1993	Monie Love	Simon Fleury
#114. March 1993	Jane Horrocks	Matthew R. Lewis
#115. April 1993	Sarah Cracknell	Matthew R. Lewis
#116. May 1993	Björk	Matthew R. Lewis
#117. June 1993	Kristen McMenamy	Juergen Teller
#118. July 1993	Karen Ferrari	Juergen Teller
#119. August 1993	Gillian Gilbert	Donald Christie
#120. September 1993	Naomi Campbell	Jenny Howarth
#121. October 1993	unidentified model	Stefan Ruiz
#122. November 1993	Linda Evangelista	Juergen Teller
#123. December 1993	Kate Moss	Corinne Day
#124. January 1994	Veronica Webb	Steven Klein
#125. February 1994	Justine Frischmann	Juergen Teller
#126. March 1994	Amber Valletta	Craig McDean
#127. April 1994	Courtney Love	Juergen Teller
#128. May 1994	Christy Turlington	Juergen Teller
#129. June 1994	Sonya Aurora-Madan	Craig McDean
#130. July 1994	Kylie Minogue	Ellen von Unwerth
#131. August 1994	Kate Moss & Naomi Campbell	Steven Klein
#132. September 1994	Björk	Ellen von Unwerth
#133. October 1994	Brett Anderson & Stella Tennant	Jean-Baptiste Mondino
# 134. November 1994	Bridget Hall	Steven Klein
#135. December 1994	Heather Small	Christian Wlitkin
#136. January 1995	Kiara Kabukuru	Craig McDean
#137. February 1995	unidentified models	Terry Jones
#138. March 1995	Drew Barrymore	Ellen von Unwerth
#139. April 1995	Nikki Uberti	Terry Richardson
#140. May 1995	Tank Girl	Jamie Hewlett
#141. June 1995	Shalom Harlow	Craig McDean
#142. July 1995	Nadja Auermann	Craig McDean
#143. August 1995	unidentified model	Ellen von Unwerth
#144. September 1995	PJ Harvey	Craig McDean
#145. October 1995	no cover model	Terry Jones
#146. November 1995	Emma Balfour	Craig McDean
#147. December 1995	Stella Tennant	Craig McDean
#148. January 1996	Carolyn Murphy	Terry Richardson
#149. February 1996	Kate Moss	David Sims
#150. March 1996	Kristen McMenamy	Juergen Teller
#151. April 1996	Lorraine Pascale	Craig McDean
#152. May 1996	Guinevere Van Seenus	Mark Borthwick
#153. June 1996	Shirley Manson	Ellen von Unwerth
#154. July 1996	Björk & Goldie	Lorenzo Agius
#155. August 1996	Naomi Campbell	Paolo Roversi
#156. September 1996	Brett Anderson	Nick Knight
#157. October 1996	Iris Palmer	Max Vadukul
#158. November 1996	Angela Lindvall	Juergen Teller
#159. December 1996	Jamie Rishar	Matt Jones
#160. January 1997	unidentified model	Stéphane Sednaoui
#161. February 1997	Annie Morton	Terry Richardson
#162. March 1997	Sharleen Spiteri	Craig McDean
#163. April 1997	Courtney Love	Ellen von Unwerth
#164. May 1997	Gaz Coombes	Lorenzo Agius
#165. June 1997	Susan Carmen	Craig McDean
#166. July 1997	unidentified model	Matt Jones
#167. August 1997	Kate Moss	Terry Richardson
#168. September 1997	Kylie Minogue	Mark Mattock
#169. October 1997	Audrey Marnay	Juergen Teller
#170. November 1997	Mel B	Terry Richardson
#171. December 1997	Laura Foster	David Sims
#172. January/February 1998	Naomi Campbell	Elfie Semotan
#173. March 1998	La Vera Chapel	Donald Graham
#174. April 1998	Alek Wek	Mark Mattock
#175. May 1998	Kirsten Owen	Paolo Roversi
#176. June 1998	Maggie Rizer	Craig McDean
#177. July 1998	Kiara Kabukuru	Jamil GS
#178. August 1998	Erin O'Connor	Juergen Teller
#179. September 1998	Devon Aoki	Ellen von Unwerth
#180. October 1998	Shalom Harlow	Carter Smith
#181. November 1998	Alissa Bennett	Kayt Jones
#182. December 1998	Gisele Bündchen	David Sims
#183. January/February 1999	Melanie C	Donald Christie
#184. March 1999	Amber Valletta	Richard Burbridge
#185. April 1999	Colette Pechekhonova	Richard Burbridge
#186. May 1999	Heidi Klum	Max Vadukul
#187. June 1999	Lisa Ratliffe	Paolo Roversi
#188. July 1999	Bridget Hall	David Sims
#189. August 1999	Oluchi Onweagba	Richard Burbridge
#190. September 1999	Christy Turlington	Richard Burbridge
#191. October 1999	Guinevere Van Seenus	Craig McDean
#192. November 1999	Naomi Campbell	David LaChapelle
#193. December 1999	Milla Jovovich	Matt Jones

== 2000s ==
Issue	Cover model	Photographer
#194. January/February 2000	Chloë Sevigny	Matt Jones
#195. March 2000	Gisele Bündchen	Richard Burbridge
#196. April 2000	Lil' Kim	Steven Klein
#197. May 2000	May Andersen	Richard Burbridge
#198. June 2000	Marleen Berkova	Matt Jones
#199. July 2000	Alek Wek	Richard Burbridge
#200. August 2000	no model cover	Terry Jones
#201. September 2000	Björk	Mert & Marcus
#202. October 2000	Angela Lindvall	Max Vadukul
#203. November 2000	Luciana Curtis	Kayt Jones
#204. December 2000	Ana Cláudia Michels	David LaChapelle
#205. January 2001	Nataša Vojnović	David Sims
#206. February 2001	Chloe Winkel & Robbie Snelders	Willy Vanderperre
#207. March 2001	Kate Moss	Tesh
#208. April 2001	Stella Tennant	Richard Burbridge
#209. May 2001	Jolene Reynolds	Craig McDean
#210. June 2001	Laetitia Casta	Kayt Jones
#211. July 2001	Tom Ford	Terry Richardson
#212. August 2001	Eleonora Bosé	Tesh
#213. September 2001	Aaliyah	Matt Jones
#214. October 2001	Bridget Hall	Tesh
#215. November 2001	Charlotte Gainsbourg	Michel Momy
#216. December/January 2002	Liv Tyler	Matt Jones
#217. February 2002	Gisele Bündchen	Tesh
#218. March 2002	Carolyn Murphy	Craig McDean
#219. April 2002	Devon Aoki	Paolo Roversi
#220. May 2002	Natalia Vodianova	Steven Klein
#221. June/July 2002	Kate Moss	Craig McDean
#222. August 2002	An Oost	Steven Klein
#223. September 2002	Jamie Bochert	Steven Klein
#224. October 2002	Amber Valletta	Craig McDean
#225. November 2002	Liberty Ross	Kayt Jones
#226. December 2002	Christina Ricci	Carter Smith
#227. January 2003	Shannyn Sossamon	Matt Jones
#228. February 2003	Naomi Campbell	Tesh
#229. March 2003	Dewi Driegen	Patrick Demarchelier
#230. April 2003	Kate Moss	Mert & Marcus
#231. May 2003	Jessica Miller	Matt Jones
#232. June 2003	Tilda Swinton	Craig McDean
#233. July 2003	Chloë Sevigny & Terry Richardson	Terry Richardson
#234. August 2003	Louise Pedersen	Ellen von Unwerth
#235. September 2003	Liya Kebede	Tesh
#236. October 2003	Courtney Love	David LaChapelle
#237. November 2003	Kylie Minogue	Tesh
#238. December 2003	Naomi Campbell	Ellen von Unwerth
#239. January 2004	Victoria Beckham	Ellen von Unwerth
#240. February 2004	Eugenia Volodina	Alasdair McLellan
#241. March 2004	Linda Evangelista	Tesh
#242. April 2004	Kate Moss	Tesh
#243. May 2004	Chiaki Kuriyama	Karina Taira
#244. June 2004	Missy Rayder	Richard Burbridge
#245. July 2004	Erin Wasson	Willy Vanderperre
#246. August 2004	Angela Lindvall	Matt Jones
#247. September 2004	Jessica Stam	Richard Burbridge
#248. October 2004	Julia Stegner	Tesh
#249. November 2004	Sienna Miller	Tesh
#250. December 2004/January 2005	Gwen Stefani	Matt Jones
#251. February 2005	Jack McElhone	Alasdair McLellan
#252. March 2005	Ludivine Sagnier	Kayt Jones
#253. April 2005	Isabelle Huppert	Paolo Roversi
#254. May 2005	Isabeli Fontana	Tesh
#255. June 2005	M.I.A.	Wolfgang Tillmans
#256. July 2005	Diana Dondoe	Mario Sorrenti
#257. August 2005	Teairra Marí & Jay-Z	Terry Richardson
#258. September 2005	Carolyn Murphy	Craig McDean
#258. September 2005	Daria Werbowy	Inez & Vinoodh
#258. September 2005	Kate Moss	Tesh
#258. September 2005	Liya Kebede	Matt Jones
#259. October 2005	Gemma Ward	Nick Knight
#260. November 2005	Naomi Watts	Ben Watts
#261. December 2005	Lady Sovereign	Alasdair McLellan
#262. January 2006	Lily Donaldson	Richard Burbridge
#263. February 2006	Oscar	Alasdair McLellan
#264. March 2006	Gisele Bündchen	Matt Jones
#265. April 2006	Patricia Schmid	Richard Bush
#266. May 2006	Lily Cole	Tim Walker
#267. June/July 2006	Snejana Onopka	Richard Burbridge
#268. August 2006	Beyoncé	Matt Jones
#269. September 2006	Claudia Schiffer	Emma Summerton
#269. September 2006	Lindsay Lohan	Matt Jones
#270. October 2006	Angela Lindvall	Richard Bush
#271. November 2006	Coco Rocha; Flash Louis	Alasdair McLellan
#272. December 2006/January 2007	Cassie Ventura & P. Diddy	Magnus Unnar
#273. February 2007	Caio Vaz	Collier Schorr
#274. March 2007	Lily Donaldson	Alasdair McLellan & Mario Sorrenti
#275. April 2007	Clémence Poésy	Paolo Roversi
#276. May 2007	Cat Power	Karl Lagerfeld
#277. June 2007	Björk	Inez & Vinoodh
#278. July 2007	Devon Aoki, Jeremy Scott & Devon Aoki	Jeremy Scott
#279. August 2007	Daisy Lowe & Will Blondelle	Terry Richardson
#280. September 2007	Gemma Ward	Emma Summerton
#281. October 2007	Naomi Campbell	Mario Sorrenti
#282. November 2007	Kate Moss	Emma Summerton
#283. December 2007/January 2008	Cate Blanchett	Matthias Vriens-McGrath
#284. February 2008	Gemma Ward & Lily Donaldson	Emma Summerton
#285. March 2008	Raquel Zimmermann	Emma Summerton
#286. April 2008	Rinko Kikuchi	Matt Jones
#287. May 2008	Agyness Deyn (6 covers)	Alasdair McLellan; Billy Sullivan; Matt Jones (2 covers); Terry Richardson; Walter Pfeiffer
#288. June 2008	Mariah Carey	Vincent Peters
#289. July 2008	Sasha Pivovarova	Emma Summerton (2 covers)
#290. August 2008	Naomi Campbell & Stefano Pilati	Inez & Vinoodh
#291. September 2008	Jourdan Dunn	Emma Summerton
#292. October 2008	Natasha Poly	Emma Summerton
#293. November 2008	Lara Stone	Alasdair McLellan
#294. December 2008	Leona Lewis	Emma Summerton
#295. January 2009	Enikő Mihalik	Inez & Vinoodh
#296. February 2009	Anne Vyalitsyna & Boyd Holbrook	Matt Jones
#297. March 2009	Alice Dellal, Agyness Deyn, Daisy Lowe, Eliza Cummings, Jourdan Dunn, Kate Moss, Lily Donaldson, Naomi Campbell, Stella Tennant, Susie Bick, Twiggy & Yasmin Le Bon	Sølve Sundsbø
#298. April 2009	Miuccia Prada	Francesco Vezzoli
#299. May 2009	Chanel Iman	Kayt Jones
300. #June/July 2009	Tasha Tilberg	Kayt Jones
300. #June/July 2009	Sigrid Agren	Alasdair McLellan
300. #June/July 2009	Raquel Zimmermann	Juergen Teller
#301. August 2009	Lily Allen	Alasdair McLellan
#302. Pre-Fall 2009	Chanel Iman, Sessilee Lopez, Jourdan Dunn & Arlenis Sosa	Emma Summerton
#303. Fall 2009	Frida Giannini & James Franco	Inez & Vinoodh
#303. Fall 2009	Linder Sterling	Tim Walker
#303. Fall 2009	Shakira	Kayt Jones
#304. Winter 2009	Eva Herzigová, Helena Christensen & Claudia Schiffer	Kayt Jones
#304. Winter 2009	Georgia May Jagger	Paolo Roversi
#304. Winter 2009	Lara Stone & Jamie Dornan	Alasdair McLellan

== 2010s ==
Issue	Cover model	Photographer
#305. Pre-Spring 2010	Mariacarla Boscono & Riccardo Tisci	Mert & Marcus
#305. Pre-Spring 2010	Natasha Poly	Emma Summerton
#305. Pre-Spring 2010	Rihanna	Willy Vanderperre
306. Spring 2010	Freja Beha Erichsen & Sasha Pivovarova	Emma Summerton
306. Spring 2010	Natalia Vodianova	Paolo Roversi
307. Summer 2010	Gisele Bündchen	Matt Jones
307. Summer 2010	Jeneil Williams	Daniel Jackson
307. Summer 2010	Miranda Kerr	Willy Vanderperre
308. Pre-Fall 2010	Kate Moss, Lady Gaga & Naomi Campbell	Nick Knight
#309. Fall 2010	Daisy Lowe	Marcel Door
#309. Fall 2010	Joan Smalls, Kristen McMenamy, Liya Kebede & Małgosia Bela	Daniele & Iango
#309. Fall 2010	Lindsey Wixson	Emma Summerton
#310. Winter 2010	Abbey Lee Kershaw	David Bailey
#310. Winter 2010	Dree Hemingway	Matt Jones
#310. Winter 2010	Kanye West	Fabien Montique
#310. Winter 2010	Kate Moss	Alasdair McLellan
#311. Pre-Spring 2011	Ajak Deng	Emma Summerton
#311. Pre-Spring 2011	Liu Wen, Kirsi Pyrhonen, Jeneil Williams, Milou van Groesen & Rose Cordero	Josh Olins
#311. Pre-Spring 2011	Vanessa Paradis	Paolo Roversi
#311. Pre-Spring 2011	Jessica Stam, Hilary Rhoda, Chanel Iman & Erin Wasson	Kayt Jones
#311. Pre-Spring 2011	Dani Tull	Hedi Slimane
#312. Spring 2011	Anja Rubik	Emma Summerton
#312. Spring 2011	Karlie Kloss, Jourdan Dunn, Meghan Collison, Shu Pei & Tatiana Cotliar	Kayt Jones
#312. Spring 2011	Lady Gaga	Mariano Vivanco
#313. Summer 2011	Amber Valletta	Craig McDean
#313. Summer 2011	Stella Tennant	Paolo Roversi
#313. Summer 2011	Kristen McMenamy	Josh Olins
#313. Summer 2011	Daphne Groeneveld	Daniel Jackson
#313. Summer 2011	Behati Prinsloo	Matt Jones
#313. Summer 2011	Patrick O'Donnell	Alasdair McLellan
#314. Pre-Fall 2011	Gisele Bündchen	Emma Summerton
#314. Pre-Fall 2011	Lindsey Wixson	Terry Richardson
#314. Pre-Fall 2011	Riley Keough	Matt Jones
#314. Pre-Fall 2011	Raquel Zimmermann	Josh Olins
#314. Pre-Fall 2011	Natasha Poly	Willy Vanderperre
#314. Pre-Fall 2011	Kreayshawn	George Harvey
#315. Fall 2011	Abbey Lee Kershaw	Richard Bush
#315. Fall 2011	Carine Roitfeld	Terry Richardson
#315. Fall 2011	Fei Fei Sun	Daniel Jackson
#315. Fall 2011	Lara Stone	David Bailey
#316. Winter 2011	Anja Rubik	David Bailey
#316. Winter 2011	Hailey Clauson	Matt Jones
#316. Winter 2011	Jourdan Dunn	Alasdair McLellan
#316. Winter 2011	Saskia de Brauw	Daniel Jackson
#316. Winter 2011	Benjamin Eidem	Willy Vanderperre
#316. Winter 2011	Joan Smalls	Benjamin Alexander Huseby
#317. Pre-Spring 2012	Pan Yan, Meng Lu, Quncuo & Li Zheng	Chen Man
#317. Pre-Spring 2012	Stella Tennant	Sølve Sundsbø
#317. Pre-Spring 2012	Victoria Beckham	Josh Olins
#317. Pre-Spring 2012	Dylan Riley	Hedi Slimane
#317. Pre-Spring 2012	Lara Stone	Alasdair McLellan
#317. Pre-Spring 2012	Lara Mullen & Matt Ardell	Jeff Bark
#318. Spring 2012	Carolyn Murphy, Guinevere Van Seenus, Hahn-Bin, Shalom Harlow & Sui He	Daniele & Iango
#318. Spring 2012	Daphne Groeneveld	Richard Bush
#318. Spring 2012	Georgia May Jagger	Walter Pfeiffer
#318. Spring 2012	Karl Lagerfeld	Karl Lagerfeld
#318. Spring 2012	Vivienne Westwood	Juergen Teller
#319. Summer 2012	Raf Simons	Willy Vanderperre
#319. Summer 2012	Julia Restoin Roitfeld	Mario Sorrenti
#319. Summer 2012	Andrew Garfield & Léa Seydoux	Alasdair McLellan
#319. Summer 2012	Agyness Deyn	Scott Trindle
#319. Summer 2012	Andreja Pejić & Dree Hemingway	Matt Jones
#319. Summer 2012	Arizona Muse	Kayt Jones
#319. Summer 2012	Felicity Hayward	Mark Lebon
#320. Pre-Fall 2012	Cara Delevingne, Charlotte Free & Kelly Mittendorf	Terry Richardson
#320. Pre-Fall 2012	Kel Markey & Herieth Paul	Sølve Sundsbø
#320. Pre-Fall 2012	Meghan Collison	Patrick Demarchelier
#320. Pre-Fall 2012	Ben Drew	Alasdair McLellan
#320. Pre-Fall 2012	Chen Yunxia, Guo Yupei & Li Jia	Chen Man
#320. Pre-Fall 2012	FKA Twigs	Matthew Stone
#320. Pre-Fall 2012	Janice Alida	David Sims
#320. Pre-Fall 2012	Shota Matsuda	Takay
#321. Fall 2012	Amber Valletta, Gisele Bündchen, Guinevere Van Seenus, Isabeli Fontana, Karen Elson, Kolfinna Kristófersdóttir, Kristen McMenamy, Linda Evangelista, Natasha Poly & Stephanie Seymour	Daniele & Iango
#321. Fall 2012	Aymeline Valade, Candice Huffine, Iselin Steiro & Jourdan Dunn	Emma Summerton
#321. Fall 2012	Edie Campbell	Matt Jones
#321. Fall 2012	Fan Bingbing	Chen Man
#322. Winter 2012	Arizona Muse	Richard Bush
#322. Winter 2012	Cara Delevingne	Angelo Pennetta
#322. Winter 2012	Grace Coddington	Arthur Elgort
#322. Winter 2012	Laetitia Casta & Lara Stone	Daniele & Iango
#322. Winter 2012	Lena Dunham	Todd Cole
#322. Winter 2012	Neneh Cherry	Mark Lebon
#322. Winter 2012	Will Chalker	Bruno Staub
#323. Pre-Spring 2013	Kate Moss (4 covers)	Daniele & Iango
#323. Pre-Spring 2013	Karmen Pedaru	Daniel Jackson
#323. Pre-Spring 2013	Suvi Koponen	Kayt Jones
#323. Pre-Spring 2013	Louise Parker, Codie Young, Magda Laguinge & Charlie Bredal	Richard Bush
#324. Spring 2013	Amra Cerkezovic & Karlie Kloss	Matt Jones
#324. Spring 2013	Joan Smalls	Mikael Jansson
#324. Spring 2013	Lara Stone	Tyrone Lebon
#324. Spring 2013	Reuben Ramacher	Hedi Slimane
#325. Summer 2013	Grace Bol	William Baker
#325. Summer 2013	Julia Nobis	Paul Wetherell
#325. Summer 2013	Lily McMenamy	Benjamin Alexander Huseby
#325. Summer 2013	Sam Rollinson	Alasdair McLellan
#325. Summer 2013	Stella Tennant	Josh Olins
#325. Summer 2013	Xiao Wen Ju	Sølve Sundsbø
326. Pre-Fall 2013	Blondey McCoy	Alasdair McLellan
326. Pre-Fall 2013	Catherine McNeil	Collier Schorr
326. Pre-Fall 2013	Jourdan Dunn	Quentin Jones
326. Pre-Fall 2013	Ondria Hardin	Daniele & Iango
326. Pre-Fall 2013	Selena Gomez	Scott Trindle
326. Pre-Fall 2013	Sky Ferreira	Angelo Pennetta
#327. Fall 2013	Amanda Murphy	Willy Vanderperre
#327. Fall 2013	Joan Smalls & Ronald Epps	Matt Jones
#327. Fall 2013	Kate Moss	Craig McDean
#327. Fall 2013	Natalia Vodianova	Willy Vanderperre
#328. Winter 2013	Anna Ewers	Boo George
#328. Winter 2013	Azzedine Alaia	Sølve Sundsbø
#328. Winter 2013	Candice Swanepoel	Matt Jones
#328. Winter 2013	Cara Delevingne	Richard Bush
#328. Winter 2013	King Krule	Alasdair McLellan
#328. Winter 2013	Lily McMenamy	Tyrone Lebon
#329. Pre-Spring 2014	Edie Campbell	Alasdair McLellan
#330. Spring 2014	Daria Werbowy	Karim Sadli
#331. Summer 2014	Julia Nobis	Willy Vanderperre
#332. Pre-Fall 2014	ASAP Rocky & Binx Walton	Daniel Jackson
#333. Fall 2014	Sasha Pivovarova	Glen Luchford
#334. Winter 2014	Mica Argañaraz	Willy Vanderperre
#335. Pre-Spring 2015	Rihanna	Paolo Roversi
#336. Spring 2015	Natalie Westling	Willy Vanderperre
#337. Summer 2015	Anna Ewers, Adrienne Jüliger, Damaris Goddrie, Daria Werbowy, Edie Campbell, Freja Beha Erichsen, Grace Hartzel, Greta Varlese, Lady Jean Campbell, Jourdan Dunn, Karly Loyce, Kate Moss, Lara Stone, Małgosia Bela, Natalie Westling, Rianne van Rompaey, Stella Tennant & Tyler Littlejohns	Alasdair McLellan
#338. Pre-Fall 2015	Willow Smith (2 covers)	Tyrone Lebon
#339. Fall 2015	Elle Fanning	Collier Schorr
#340. Winter 2015	Adele & Justin Bieber	Alasdair McLellan
#341. Pre-Spring 2016	Dilone, Fernanda Ly, Frederikke Sofie & Ruth Bell	Mario Sorrenti
#342. Spring 2016	Lineisy Montero (3 covers)	Harley Weir
#343. Summer 2016	Clara Deshayes	Willy Vanderperre
#343. Summer 2016	Lina Hoss & Selena Forrest	Daniel Jackson
#343. Summer 2016	Yasmin Wijnaldum	Collier Schorr
#344. Pre-Fall 2016	Adwoa Aboah (3 covers)	Harley Weir; Inez van Lamsweerde; Letty Schmiterlow
#345. Fall 2016	Anna Ewers	Mario Sorrenti
#345. Fall 2016	Stormzy	Oliver Hadlee Pearch
#346. Winter 2016	Sasha Lane	Zoë Ghertner
#347. Spring 2017	Mica Argañaraz	Mario Sorrenti
#348. Summer 2017	Adwoa Aboah, Slick Woods & Elliott Jay Brown	Tim Walker
#349. Fall 2017	Mathilde Henning	David Sims
#349. Fall 2017	Paris Jackson	Willy Vanderperre
#349. Fall 2017	Selena Forrest	Zoë Ghertner
#350. Winter 2017	Frank Ocean	Frank Ocean
#350. Winter 2017	Kendrick Lamar	Craig McDean
#350. Winter 2017	Tommy Genesis	Mario Sorrenti
#351. Spring 2018	Adut Akech	Mario Sorrenti
#351. Spring 2018	Adwoa Aboah, Anja Rubik, Cameron Russell, Christy Turlington, Dara Allen, Doutzen Kroes, Hanne Gaby Odiele, Liya Kebede, Paloma Elsesser & Teddy Quinlivan	Inez & Vinoodh
#351. Spring 2018	Binx Walton	Zoë Ghertner
#351. Spring 2018	Cardi B	Oliver Hadlee Pearch
#352. Summer 2018	Cara Taylor	Amy Troost
#352. Summer 2018	Dave	Alasdair McLellan
#352. Summer 2018	Jazzelle Zanaughtti	Daniel Jackson
#352. Summer 2018	Kaia Gerber	Mario Sorrenti
#352. Summer 2018	SZA	Petra Collins
#353. Fall 2018	Adesuwa Aighewi	Oliver Hadlee Pearch
#353. Fall 2018	Adut Akech	Campbell Addy
#353. Fall 2018	Anok Yai	Ethan James Green
#354. Winter 2018	Timothée Chalamet	Mario Sorrenti
#355. Spring 2019	Rebecca Leigh Longendyke	Alasdair McLellan
#355. Spring 2019	Solange	Tim Walker
#355. Spring 2019	Lucien Clarke	David Sims
#356. Summer 2019	Greta Thunberg	Harley Weir
#356. Summer 2019	Ugbad Abdi	Zoë Ghertner
#356. Summer 2019	Steve Lacy	Tyler Mitchell
#356. Summer 2019	Nathan Westling	Collier Schorr
#357. Autumn 2019	FKA twigs	Willy Vanderperre
#357. Autumn 2019	Kevin Abstract	Mario Sorrenti
#357. Autumn 2019	Mona Tougaard	Mert & Marcus
#357. Autumn 2019	Fernando Líndez	Willy Vanderperre
#357. Autumn 2019	Zoë Kravitz	Gus Van Sant
#357. Autumn 2019	Tyshawn Jones	Mario Sorrenti
#358. Winter 2019	Megan Thee Stallion	Ethan James Green
#358. Winter 2019	Noah Carlos	Amy Troost
#358. Winter 2019	Mona Tougaard	Daniel Jackson
#358. Winter 2019	Motherlan	Tyler Mitchell
#358. Winter 2019	Koffee	Mario Sorrenti
#358. Winter 2019	Naomi Campbell	Mario Sorrenti

== 2020s ==
=== 2020 ===
Issue	Cover model	Photographer
#359. Spring 2020	Kate Moss	Mario Sorrenti
#359. Spring 2020	Gigi Hadid	Jamie Hawkesworth
#359. Spring 2020	Adut Akech	Daniel Jackson
#359. Spring 2020	Rianne van Rompaey	Alasdair McLellan
#359. Spring 2020	Binx Walton	Oliver Hadlee Pearch
#359. Spring 2020	Kaia Gerber	Willy Vanderperre
#360. Summer 2020	Pharrell Williams	Mert Alas & Marcus Piggott
#361. Autumn 2020	Kendrick Lamar & Baby Keem	Glen Luchford
#361. Autumn 2020	Björk & Arca	Mert Alas & Marcus Piggott
#361. Autumn 2020	Paloma, Sage & Ama Elsesser	Rahim Fortune
#361. Autumn 2020	Daan Duez & Ilona Desmet	Willy Vanderperre
#361. Autumn 2020	Ned Sims	David Sims
#361. Autumn 2020	Kristen & Lily McMenamy	Alasdair McLellan
#361. Autumn 2020	Stefan, Teenage Precinct Shoppers (1990)	Nigel Shafran

=== 2021 ===
Issue	Cover model	Photographer
#362. Spring 2021	Travis Scott	Spike Jonze
#362. Spring 2021	Naomi Campbell	Luis Alberto Rodríguez
#362. Spring 2021	Kate Moss	Jamie Hawkesworth
#362. Spring 2021	Martha, Gilles, Tijmen, Aäron & Line	Willy Vanderperre
#362. Spring 2021	Maty & Mika	Alasdair McLellan
#362. Spring 2021	Lu Han	Luo Yang
#362. Spring 2021	Imaan Hammam	Mario Sorrenti
#362. Spring 2021	Kaia Gerber	Zoë Ghertner
#362. Spring 2021	Janaya Khan	Mario Sorrenti
#363. Summer 2021	Gigi Hadid	Daniel Jackson
#363. Summer 2021	Precious Lee	Tyler Mitchell
#363. Summer 2021	Phil Foden	Alasdair McLellan
#363. Summer 2021	Celina Ralph	Mario Sorrenti
#363. Summer 2021	Binx Walton	Stef Mitchell
#363. Summer 2021	Digga D	Liz Johnson Artur
#363. Summer 2021	City Girls	Gray Sorrenti
#364. Autumn 2021	Billie Eilish	Glen Luchford
#364. Autumn 2021	Mona Tougaard	Luis Alberto Rodriguez
#364. Autumn 2021	Anok Yai	Amy Troost
#364. Autumn 2021	Rianne Van Rompaey	Colin Dodgson
#364. Autumn 2021	Fran Summers	Alasdair McLellan
#364. Autumn 2021	Mica Argañaraz	Drew Vickers
#364. Autumn 2021	Atlanta Stret Cast	Tyler Mitchell
#365. Winter 2021	Jafa's Le Rage	Arthur Jafa
#366. The Out Of The Blue Issue 2021	Kim Kardashian, Nas, Tyshawn Jones & Imaan Hammam, Young Thug, Lil Baby, ASAP Ferg, Devyn Garcia	Mario Sorrenti

=== 2022 ===
Issue	Cover model	Photographer
#367. Spring 2022	Paloma Elsesser	Sam Rock
#367. Spring 2022	Kendall Jenner	Luis Alberto Rodriguez
#367. Spring 2022	Rosalía	Oliver Hadlee Pearch
#367. Spring 2022	Cruz Beckham	Steven Klein
#367. Spring 2022	Hunter Schafer	Stef Mitchell
#367. Spring 2022	HoYeon Jung	Colin Dodgson
#367. Spring 2022	Binx Walton	Amy Troost
#368. Summer 2022	Vittoria Ceretti	Mario Sorrenti
#368. Summer 2022	Celina Ralph	Zoë Ghertner
#368. Summer 2022	Mica Argañaraz	Stef Mitchell
#369. Fall 2022	Elio Berenett	David Sims
#369. Fall 2022	Rianne Van Rompaey	Willy Vanderperre
#369. Fall 2022	Anok Yai	Mario Sorrenti
#369. Fall 2022	Naomi Campbell and Goldie	Johnny Duffort
#369. Fall 2022	Enya and Tay	Alasdair McLellan
#369. Fall 2022	Awar Odhiang	Amy Troost
#369. Fall 2022	Kiki Willems	Dan Jackson
#369. Fall 2022	Simona Kust	Drew Vickers
#369. Fall 2022	Bella Hadid	Sam Rock
#370. Winter 2022	Nicki Minaj	Luis Alberto Rodriguez
#370. Winter 2022	Stormzy	David Sims

=== 2023 ===
Issue	Cover model	Photographer
#371. Spring 2023	Kristen McMenamy	David Sims
#371. Spring 2023	Lily-Rose Depp	Karim Sadli
#371. Spring 2023	Kaia Gerber	Tyler Mitchell
#371. Spring 2023	Julia Nobis	Stef Mitchell
#371. Spring 2023	Headie One	Bolade Banjo
#371. Spring 2023	Selena Forrest	Daniel Jackson
#371. Spring 2023	Wali Deutsch	Mario Sorrenti
#372. Summer 2023	Anna Ewers	Zoë Ghertner
#373. Fall/Winter 2023	North West	Willy Vanderperre
#373. Fall/Winter 2023	Sampha	Frank Lebon
#373. Fall/Winter 2023	Colin Jones	Zoë Ghertner
#373. Fall/Winter 2023	Rema	Renell Medrano
#373. Fall/Winter 2023	Nyajuok Gatdet	Mario Sorrenti
#373. Fall/Winter 2023	PinkPantheress	Alasdair McLellan
#373. Fall/Winter 2023	Sasha Colby	Willy Vanderperre
#373. Fall/Winter 2023	Alex Consani	Alasdair McLellan
#373. Fall/Winter 2023	Peter and Paul Ohunyon	Tyler Mitchell

=== 2024 ===
Issue	Cover model	Photographer
'Special Zine' September 2024	Charli XCX, Troye Sivan	Eli Russell Linnetz
'Special Zine : Brother's Keeper' October 2024	Akoor Y	Gabriel Moses
'Special Zine : Brother's Keeper' October 2024	Alek Wek	Gabriel Moses
'Special Zine : Brother's Keeper' October 2024	Grace Moses, Gabriel Moses	Gabriel Moses
'Special Zine : Brother's Keeper' October 2024	Mowalola, Adit Priscilla	Gabriel Moses
'Special Zine : Brother's Keeper' October 2024	Nyandeng Makur	Gabriel Moses
'Special Zine : Brother's Keeper' October 2024	Olaolu Slawn, Beau	Gabriel Moses
'Special Zine : Brother's Keeper' October 2024	Olaolu Slawn, Gabriel Moses, Clint 419	Gabriel Moses
'Special Zine : Brother's Keeper' October 2024	Teedemba, Zerai	Gabriel Moses
'Special Zine : Number One' November 2024	Rosé	Larissa Hofmann

=== 2025 ===
Issue	Cover model	Photographer
#374. Spring/Summer 2025	Enza Khoury	Aidan Zamiri
#374. Spring/Summer 2025	Naomi Campbell	Thibaut Grevet
#374. Spring/Summer 2025	FKA Twigs	Arnaud Lajeunie
#375. Autumn/Winter 2025	Deva	Torso
#375. Autumn/Winter 2025	Bad Bunny	Ryan McGinley
#375. Autumn/Winter 2025	Olivier Rousteing	Francesco Nazardo
#375. Autumn/Winter 2025	Teyana Taylor	Jason Nocito
#375. Autumn/Winter 2025	Paris Hilton	Valentin Herfray

=== 2026 ===
Issue	Cover model	Photographer
#376. Spring/Summer 2026	EsDeeKid	Aidan Zamiri
#376. Spring/Summer 2026	Bhavitha Mandava	Inez & Vinoodh
#376. Spring/Summer 2026	Martin Parr	Martin Parr
#376. Spring/Summer 2026	SZA	Torso
'Special Zine' June 2026	Alexa Demie	Petra Collins
#377. Autumn 2026	2hollis	Jamie Heath
#377. Autumn 2026	Gisele Bündchen	Collier Schorr
#377. Autumn 2026	Mia Goth	Angela Hill
#377. Autumn 2026	Katharine Hamnett	
'Special Zine : Cécred Edition' October 2026	Beyoncé	Blair Caldwell
