= Guinevere Van Seenus =

American model (born 1977)

Guinevere van Seenus
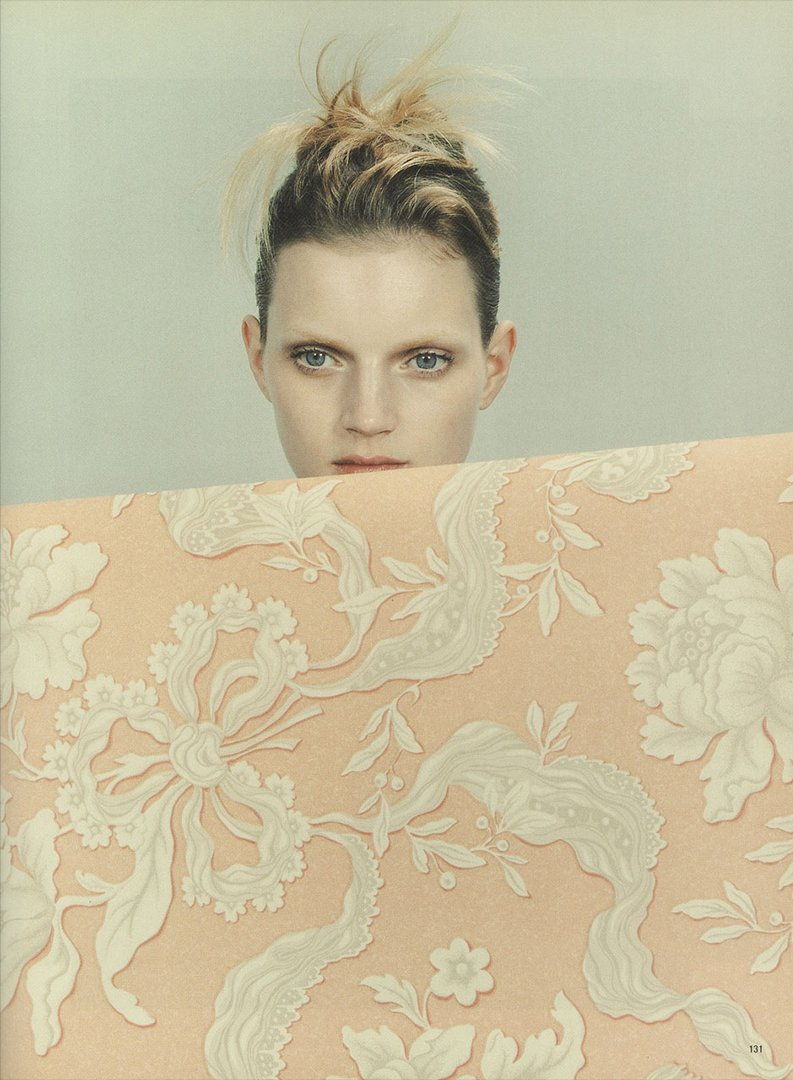
- Photo by Craig McDean
- Born: 1976 (age 49–50); Boston, Massachusetts, U.S.
- Occupations: Model, photographer
- Partner: Beau Friedlander
- Modeling information
- Height: 5 ft 9 1/2 in (1.77 m)
- Hair color: Blonde
- Eye color: Blue
- Agency: DNA Model Management (New York); Next Model Management (Paris); Next Model Management (Milan); Models 1 (London)

Guinevere Edith van Seenus (born 1976) is an American model, photographer and jewelry designer.

Born in Brookline, Massachusetts, Guinevere van Seenus was raised in Washington, D.C., and Santa Barbara, California. She is first-generation American, her parents immigrating to the United States from the Netherlands in the late 1960s.

Van Seenus began modeling at age 15 in Southern California, but did not become an A-list model right away. This happened when the model was living in Paris in 1995. Her debut on the cover of Vogue Italia was shot by Steven Meisel. The following year, she was nominated for Supermodel of the Year in the VH1 Fashion and Music Awards. She was also named on Rolling Stone’s top ten hot list for the year.

== Career ==
She has been photographed by Craig McDean, Karl Lagerfeld, Steven Klein, Mert and Marcus, Tim Walker, Colin Dodgson, Mario Sorrenti, Richard Avedon, Irving Penn, Paolo Roversi, Inez and Vinood, Peter Lindbergh, Bruce Weber, David Sims, Michael Thompson, Zoe Ghertner, Catherine Opie, Philip-Lorca diCorcia, Stephen Shore, Javier Valhonrat, Glen Luchford, Mark Borthwick, Josh Olins, Richard Burbridge, Jürgen Teller, Andres Serrano, Elad Lassry, Jan Saudek, François Nars, Luigi & Iango, Cass Bird, Collier Schorr, Roe Etheridge, Steven Meisel, Yelena Yemchuck and many others.

Van Seenus has walked the runways for Alexander McQueen, Anna Sui, Armani, Balenciaga, Bottega Veneta, Calvin Klein, Chanel, Christian LeCroix, Commes des Garçons, Diane Von Furstenberg, Dolce & Gabbana, Donna Karan, Dries van Noten, Emilio Pucci, Erdem, Etro, Fendi, Giles Deacon, Marithé + François Girbaud, Givenchy, Gucci, Helmut Lang, Hermès, Hugo Boss, Jean-Paul Gaultier, Jil Sander, John Galliano, Lanvin, Loewe, Louis Vuitton, Marc Jacobs, Marni, Martine Sitbon, Max Mara, Michael Kors, Miu Miu, Narciso Rodriguez, Prada, Rick Owens, Roberto Cavalli, Rodarte, Sonia Rykiel, Top Shop, Valentino, Versace, Versus, Vivian Westwood and Yohji Yamamoto.

She has appeared in advertising campaigns for Alaïa, Anne Klein, Alexander McQueen, Banana Republic, Barneys New York, Bergdorf Goodman, Bloomingdale's, Bottega Veneta, Brioni, Calvin Klein, Chanel, COS, Diesel, Eres, Equinox Fitness, François Nars, The Gap, Giorgio Armani, H&M, Hermés, J.Crew, Jil Sander, John Galliano, Jones New York, Kenzo, Kevin Aucoin Beauty, La Perla, Lord & Taylor, MAC Cosmetics, Macy's, Marc Jacobs, Marc O'Polo, Max Mara, Missoni, Miu Miu, Moncler, Moschino, Neiman Marcus, Nordstrom, Paul Ka Paris, the Pirelli Calendar (twice), Prada, Rena Lange, Saks Fifth Avenue, Shiseido, Swarovski, Tiffany & Co., Tom Ford, Tse, Urban Decay, Versace, Versus, Yohji Yamamoto, Zac Posen and Zara among others.

Guinevere van Seenus has appeared on at least twelve Vogue covers in editions around the world, including France, Germany, Italy, Japan, Mexico, Portugal, the Netherlands, and Ukraine, Harper’s Bazaar in the United States, United Kingdom, Spain and Korea, Other covers include W Magazine, Elle, The Face, 10 Magazine, L’Officiel, L’Uomo Vogue, The Edit, M Le Mode, Re-Edition, Dutch Magazine, Intermission, Zoo, Purpose and Perspective, Flair, Purple, Rika, Fat, Acne, Beauty Papers and Dazed.

She has appeared in editorials for American, British, Chinese, Dutch, German, Italian, Japanese, Turkish and Ukrainian Vogue, the U.S., British, Spanish and Japanese editions of Harper's Bazaar, as well as W, i-D, LOVE, V, Numéro, Dazed, CR Magazine, Purple Magazine, SSaw, Gentlewoman, Porter, Self Service, Allure, Marie Claire, Elle and Interview.

She has been a guest editor for 10 Magazine and Muse Magazine. As a photographer, van Seenus shoots with a Leica M6, Leica Minilux, large-format 4x5, 600SE Polaroid, Twin-Lens Rolleiflex as well as a Polaroid SX-70. Her work, sometimes self-portraits, has been described as ethereal. She has shot a cover story for Purpose and Perspective featuring model Kirsten Owen, and has shot for Colville and Self-Service magazine. She has attended the Met Gala with Rodarte, Marni and Vogue.

Special projects include a custom book featuring van Seenus and Saskia de Brauw for Charlotte Dauphin's jewelry creations, and many others. Van Seenus's image hung from the front of New York's Metropolitan Museum of Art to celebrate the Met Gala. That year's theme was Rei Kawakubo / Comme des Garçons: Art of the In-Between. Her image also hung from the outside of the Louvre Museum for a Yohji Yamamoto exhibit in collaboration with A Magazine. Books include a collaboration with Rodarte, Catherine Opie and Alec Soth, as well as books by Yelena Yemchuk, Drew Jarrett, Sofia Sanchez and Mauro Mongiello, and others. The subject of many photography books, she has appeared in major publications, including the book, Amber, Guinevere and Kate featuring Amber Valetta and Kate Moss by Craig McDean. She was also featured in Garden of Earthly Delights by Tim Walker. Van Seenus was one of two models to appear more than once in the J. Paul Getty Museum’s show, Icons of Style: A Century of Fashion Photography. She was also included the “Model as Muse” exhibit at the Metropolitan Museum of Art. Pat McGrath LABS, founded by the legendary British make-up artist, named a shade of lipstick after her. Designer Marc Jacobs also named a bag after van Seenus called the Guinevere Satchel.

Van Seenus is an ardent supporter of animal rescues and service animal rights. In 2018, she hosted the Humane society of New York's Fifth Fine Art Photography Benefit Auction in partnership with Aperture Foundation. The exhibit included works by Edward Steichen, Elliott Erwitt, Vincent van de Wijngard, William Wegman, Bruce Davidson, and many others. Van Seenus appears with her three-legged (tripod) rescue dog Ashley in a 2017 Banana Republic campaign, and also in a 2017 profile of the model that was published in the Sunday magazine section of the British newspaper The Daily Telegraph.

As of September 2019, van Seenus is ranked as an “Industry Icon” on models.com. She is represented by DNA Model Management in New York, Next Management in Paris and Milan, and Models 1 in London.
