= Le Book =

LE BOOK Publishing, Inc.
- Type: Media Group
- Industry: Advertising, Fashion, Photography
- Founded: 1982
- Founder: Hervé Morel, Véronique Kolasa
- Headquarters: London, Paris, New York City,
- Area served: International
- Key people: Véronique Kolasa, Michael Kazam, Fabien Duverneuil
- Products: Web, Trade shows, Books
- Services: Information and image reference
- Number of employees: 30
- Divisions: Web, Events, Print
- Website: www.lebook.com

LE BOOK is a global network and resource that offers exposure to companies and members of the creative community. The company operates three offices in three countries producing five sets of books annually (New York City, Paris, London, Berlin and Los Angeles) that are internationally distributed. The brand is well recognized for connecting the creative community for more than thirty-five years.

== Overview ==
LE BOOK printed edition is published annually in New York, Paris, London, Berlin and Los Angeles. It is considered an international reference for photography, design, production and events by many. The resource for the creative industry covers all needs related to photography, illustration, production, art direction, public relations, advertising, music and fashion. Le Book's collectable editions through the years, have been "dressed" by: Karl Lagerfeld (2002), Yves Saint Laurent (2003), Christian Lacroix (2004), Emilio Pucci (2004–05), Hermès (2005), Yohji Yamamoto (2006), Vogue (2006), Azzedine Alaia (2007), Narciso Rodriguez (2008), Vivienne Westwood (2008), Dries Van Noten (2008), Stephen Sprouse (2009), Gareth Pugh (2010), Martine Sitbon Robert Mapplethorpe (2010) and IB Kamara(2026)

LE BOOK’s website connects top industry professionals in the fashion, beauty, design, entertainment, advertising, and luxury worlds. The online database is open to all for accessing talent.

CONNECTIONS is LE BOOK’s custom-made tradeshow for the creative community. The annual event in New York, Paris and London brings thousands of participants and attendees together for networking, portfolio-viewing, trend-spotting and idea-sharing.

== Quotations ==
- "You can't book without LE BOOK", Karl Lagerfeld.
- "LE BOOK is to style what a dictionary is to a writer, a tool that helps transform the ordinary into the extraordinary...", Christian Lacroix.
