= Sophie Hicks =

British architect and fashion editor

- Born: 18 September 1960 (age 66); London, UK
- Occupation: Architect
- Children: 3, including Edie and Olympia
- Practice: Sophie Hicks Architects Ltd.
- Website: www.sophiehicks.com

Sophie Hicks is a British architect and former fashion editor.

== Early career in fashion ==
Hicks started work at the age of 17, as a guest fashion editor for the fashion magazine Harpers & Queen’s first teenage issue. She remained in fashion for a little over 10 years.

For most of this period, she worked for fashion magazines. She became a fashion editor for British Vogue and Tatler and worked with photographers Peter Lindbergh, Paolo Roversi, Arthur Elgort, Bruce Weber and David Bailey. Early in her career, she undertook a lifeswap with the American journalist and biographer, Bob Colacello, then editor of Andy Warhol's Interview Magazine.

Hicks appeared in the June 1984 cover of i-D Magazine. She was photographed by David Bailey. i-D staff included this cover in their list for the top 35 covers of the history of the magazine.

In 1986, Hicks left the magazine world to work, for two years, with the fashion designer, Azzedine Alaia, styling photographic shoots to record his oeuvre for the Alaia publication, AA.

In the same year, she also had a part in a film directed by Federico Fellini: Intervista.

== Career in architecture ==
In 1988, at the age of 28, Hicks returned to education, studying to become an architect at the Architectural Association in London. She qualified as a chartered architect in 1994.

Hicks set up her architectural practice while still a student. Her architectural career spans private residences, offices, fashion stores and art exhibitions (including, in 1997, SENSATION: Young British Artists from the Saatchi Collection).

In 1998, Hicks designed Paul Smith's first flagship store, Westbourne House in London followed by the Milan flagship store at Palazzo Gallarati Scotti. At the end of 2002, Chloé at the time under the creative direction of Phoebe Philo, asked Hicks to create a concept for their stores. In 2008, Hicks designed Yohji Yamamoto's Paris flagship store. In 2014, the architect contributed a text for the publication Yamamoto & Yohji, published by Rizzoli.

Sophie Hicks Architects' clients include Yohji Yamamoto, Paul Smith, Chloé, Acne Studios and The Royal Academy of Arts.

Hicks has participated in debate panels and talks at the Barbican Center, the Design Museum in occasion of Paul Smith's 2014 touring exhibition, at the Institute of Contemporary Arts for the panel discussion "Culture Shop: The Art of Branding", and the Victoria and Albert Museum. In 2015, Hicks together with Alice Rawsthorn gave the inaugural AA XX 100 lecture at the Architectural Association.

From 1997 to 1999, Hicks was Vice President of the Architectural Association Council.
