= Aya Jones =

French model

- Born: Aya Jones N'Guessan; September 7, 1994 (age 31)
- Occupation: Model
- Years active: 2014 - present
- Modeling information
- Height: 1.78 m (5 ft 10 in)
- Hair color: Brown
- Eye color: Brown
- Agency: The Lions (New York, Los Angeles); Elite Model Management (Paris); Monster Management (Milan)

Aya Jones N'Guessan (born 7 September 1994) is a French model.

== Early life ==
Aya Jones was born from Ivorian father and French mother. She grew up in the 11th arrondissement of Paris where her family owns a restaurant. Growing up, she practiced ballet, modern jazz, and hip-hop.

She was discovered by an agent who stopped her on the street, and led her to sign with her then-mother agency, The Lions.

== Career ==
Her first fashion show was for Prada for whom she was an exclusive at the Spring/Summer 2015 Milan Fashion Week. The following week, she was at Paris Fashion Week where she walked for designers including Giambattista Valli, Miu Miu, Viktor & Rolf, Valentino, Giambattista Valli and Nina Ricci. Katie Grand, Edward Enninful and Bethann Hardison named her one of the best models of the season, British fashion magazine i-D placed her at the fourth position of their top 10 new faces of 2014, and Interview made her one of the 15 faces of 2015.

She was photographed by Steven Meisel for Prada, advertising the brand's Pre-Fall 2015 collection alongside Natalie Westling, Willow Hand and Julia Nobis. According to Vanity Fair, she was the 44th most influent French person in the world in 2015. She was also that same year one of the favorite models of The New York Times.

She was on the cover of the August edition of Teen Vogue, which was titled "Meet the new faces of fashion". This cover made a lot of noise in the fashion industry because the three models featured on it are women of color, and it helps fighting the predominance of white models and the lack of diversity in the industry. She has been on many magazine covers since this one, including Vogue Spain, which titled the cover "Black is beautiful".

Jones was noticeably absent from 2017 fashion weeks, because of a jet ski accident in Thailand where she sustained multiple injuries. She punctured her lung and stomach and fractured her arm, pelvis, leg, and cranium. After a full year of recovery, she returned to modeling with an ad for Mango.
