= Mittendorf =

Mittendorf is a toponymic surname of German origin, referring to someone from Mittendorf, Baden-Württemberg, a neighborhood of Niedereschach, or someone who lived in the center of a village, composed of the Middle High German elements mitte, meaning "middle, center", and dorf, meaning "hamlet, village". Notable people with the surname include:

- Andrew Mittendorf (born 1977), American soccer player
- Kelly Mittendorf (born 1994), American fashion model and public relations coordinator

== See also ==
- Mittendorf's striped grass mouse, a species of mouse
- Windels Marx Lane & Mittendorf, a law firm based in New York City
