= Frédéric Sanchez =

French sound artist and music producer (born 1966)

- Born: 23 September 1966 (age 58); France
- Occupation(s): Sound artist, music producer.
- Years active: 1988–present
- Known for: Prada, Comme des Garçons, Calvin Klein, Martin Margiela, Marc Jacobs
- Style: minimal, innovative, electronic.
- Website: www.fredericsanchez.com

Frédéric Sanchez (born 23 September 1966) is a French sound artist and music producer, best known for his career in the fashion industry. His works include sound collages, mixes, original compositions, and sound installations. Major industry observers such as Vogue, Dazed, AnOther, or Business of Fashion have repeatedly referred to him as "one of the most respected sound designers working today".

In 2005 he was appointed Knight of the Order of Arts and Letters by the French ministry of Culture.

== Career overview ==
=== Fashion ===
Frédéric Sanchez's career began in 1988, when fashion designer Martin Margiela invited him to design the soundtrack for his debut show, and he since worked with various designers and brands such as Prada, Comme des Garçons, Marc Jacobs, Calvin Klein, Hermès, Jil Sander, Jean Paul Gaultier, Givenchy, Louis Vuitton, Martine Sitbon or Helmut Lang. He is a long-term collaborator to the Festival international de mode et de photographie in Hyères, France. Since its creation in 2013 he has been included in Business of Fashion's annual index of the 500 key people shaping the fashion industry.

=== Art and collaborations ===
Sanchez has designed and curated several installations and pieces, which have been displayed or performed in museums and institutions such as the Musée du quai Branly, the Musée du Louvre, the Mudam, the Grand Palais, the Foire internationale d'art contemporain (FIAC), and the parisian gallery Serge Le Borgne. He has collaborated with visual artists Louise Bourgeois, Jack Pierson, Bettina Rheims, Susanna Fritscher, and Orlan; film directors Larry Clark and Ange Leccia, architects Herzog & de Meuron, and Odile Decq. In 2008, he curated the Gainsbourg 2008 exhibition at Paris’ Cité de la Musique. In 2010, he directed his first art film, Le Soldat Sans Visage.

=== Music and film ===
Frédéric Sanchez supervised the music on three feature films, 2000 Deauville American Film Festival's Prix Michel d'Ornano winner Le Secret directed by Virginie Wagon, 2001 Berlin Film Festival's Golden Bear winner Intimacy directed by Patrice Chéreau, and 2008 Filmfest München's German Cinema Award for Peace winner Die Frau des Anarchisten directed by Peter Sehr and Marie Noëlle. In 2001, he released a music compilation featuring artists such as Mirwais, Fischerspooner, Chilly Gonzales, Peaches and Chicks On Speed.

== Selected works ==
=== Installations ===
- La Salamandre (2004) - Sound installation - Contrepoint exhibit - Musée du Louvre, Paris
- Ondes visibles (2004) - Sound installation - Nave reopening - Grand Palais, Paris
- Console (2004) - Sound performance - FIAC - Grand Palais, Paris
- Castles In The Air (2007) - Sound installation - Galerie Serge Le Borgne, Paris
- Gainsbourg 2008 (2008) - Curator - Cité de la Musique, Paris
- une utile illusion (2008) - Sound installation - Galerie Serge Le Borgne, Paris

=== Artistic Collaborations ===
- Epiderm (1999), Larry Clark - Soundtrack - Galerie Kamel Mennour, Paris
- La Vie (2000), Jack Pierson - Sound creation - Galerie Thaddaeus Ropac, Paris
- Less aesthetics more ethics (2000), Odile Decq - Sound creation - Venice Biennale of Architecture, Venice
- Soundshowers (2000), Herzog & de Meuron - Sound creation - Prada Building, Tokyo
- C'est Le Murmure De L'Eau Qui Chante (2003), Louise Bourgeois - Remix - Les Films du Siamois
- La déraison du Louvre (2006), Ange Leccia, starring Laetitia Casta - Original soundtrack - Camera Lucida Productions
- Il y'a ce que je sais (2011), Susanna Fritscher - Sound installation - l'Art dans les Chapelles Festival, Pontivy
- Gender Studies (2011), Bettina Rheims - NRW Forum, Düsseldorf
- une autre pièce : blanc (2012), Susanna Fritscher - Galerie Elisabeth & Klaus Thoman, Wienna
- Art or Sound exhibition (2014), curated by Germano Celant - Musical arrangement - Fondazione Prada, Palazzo Grassi, Venice
