= Eliza Cummings =

English model

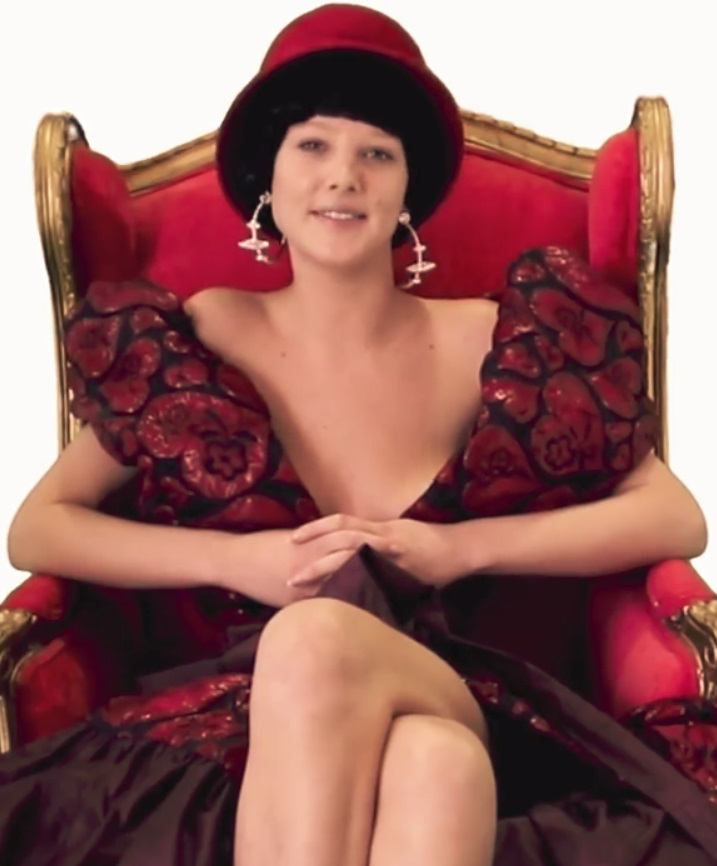
- Eliza Cummings for Love magazine in 2017
- Born: January 25, 1991 (age 35); Portsmouth, England
- Other names: Eliza Presly, Eliza Presley, Eliza Cummins Daisy Cummings
- Occupations: Model; psychologist
- Years active: 2007–present
- Spouse: Greg Williams (m. 2019)
- Modelling information
- Height: 1.75 m (5 ft 9 in)
- Hair colour: Dark brown
- Eye colour: Blue
- Agency: The Lions (New York); Women Management (Paris, Milan); Select Model Management (London); View Management (Barcelona); Longteng Model Management (Beijing)

Eliza Cummings (born 25 January 1991) is an English model. Cummings has appeared on covers of Dazed & Confused, i-D, Sunday Times Style Magazine and Vogue Italia and has appeared in editorials for Dazed & Confused, i-D, Interview, Sunday Times Style Magazine, V magazine, Vogue, Vogue Italia, Vogue Japan, Vogue UK and W Magazine. She has appeared in campaigns for many brands including Balenciaga, Calvin Klein, Coach, Costume National, Juicy Couture, Paul Smith, River Island, Top Shop, Vivienne Westwood and Uniqlo. Cummings starred in a TV commercial for Yves Saint Laurent's men's fragrance YSL L'Homme de Nuit with Vincent Cassel. She has walked in fashion shows for Anna Sui, Custo Barcelona, DKNY, Lanvin for H & M, Katie Grand Loves Hogan, Jeremy Scott, Loewe, Louis Vuitton, Marc Jacobs, Mark Fast, Oscar de la Renta, Rag & bone, Rodarte and Vivienne Westwood.

== Early life ==
Cummings was born at St Mary's hospital in Portsmouth, England, and grew up in Battersea, London. She left school at age 15 because of bullying and worked at Toni & Guy as an apprentice hairstylist.

== Career ==
At the age of 15 Cummings was signed to Select Model Management. She was signed after her mother brought her in to visit the agency. She initially modeled under the name "Eliza Presly" because her agents thought she looked like Elvis Presley. Cummings's career kicked off from the start. Her first job was Vogue Italia. Soon after, she starred in the Top Shop Fall/Winter 2008 campaign. Cummings has appeared on covers of Dazed & Confused, i-D, Sunday Times Style Magazine and Vogue Italia and has appeared in editorials for Dazed & Confused, i-D, Interview, Sunday Times Style Magazine, V magazine, Vogue, Vogue Italia, Vogue Japan, Vogue UK and W Magazine. She has appeared in campaigns for many brands including Balenciaga, ckOne, Coach, Costume National, Juicy Couture, Paul Smith, River Island, Top Shop, Vivienne Westwood and Uniqlo. Cummings starred in a TV commercial for Yves Saint Laurent's men's fragrance YSL L'Homme de Nuit with Vincent Cassel. She has walked in fashion shows for Anna Sui, Custo Barcelona, DKNY, Lanvin for H & M, Katie Grand Loves Hogan, Jeremy Scott, Loewe, Louis Vuitton, Marc Jacobs, Mark Fast, Oscar de la Renta, Rag & bone, Rodarte and Vivienne Westwood.

== Personal life ==
For a number of years, Cummings dated Nat Rothschild. Cummings married photographer and film director Greg Williams in August 2019.
