= Greg Williams (photographer) =

English photographer (born 1972)

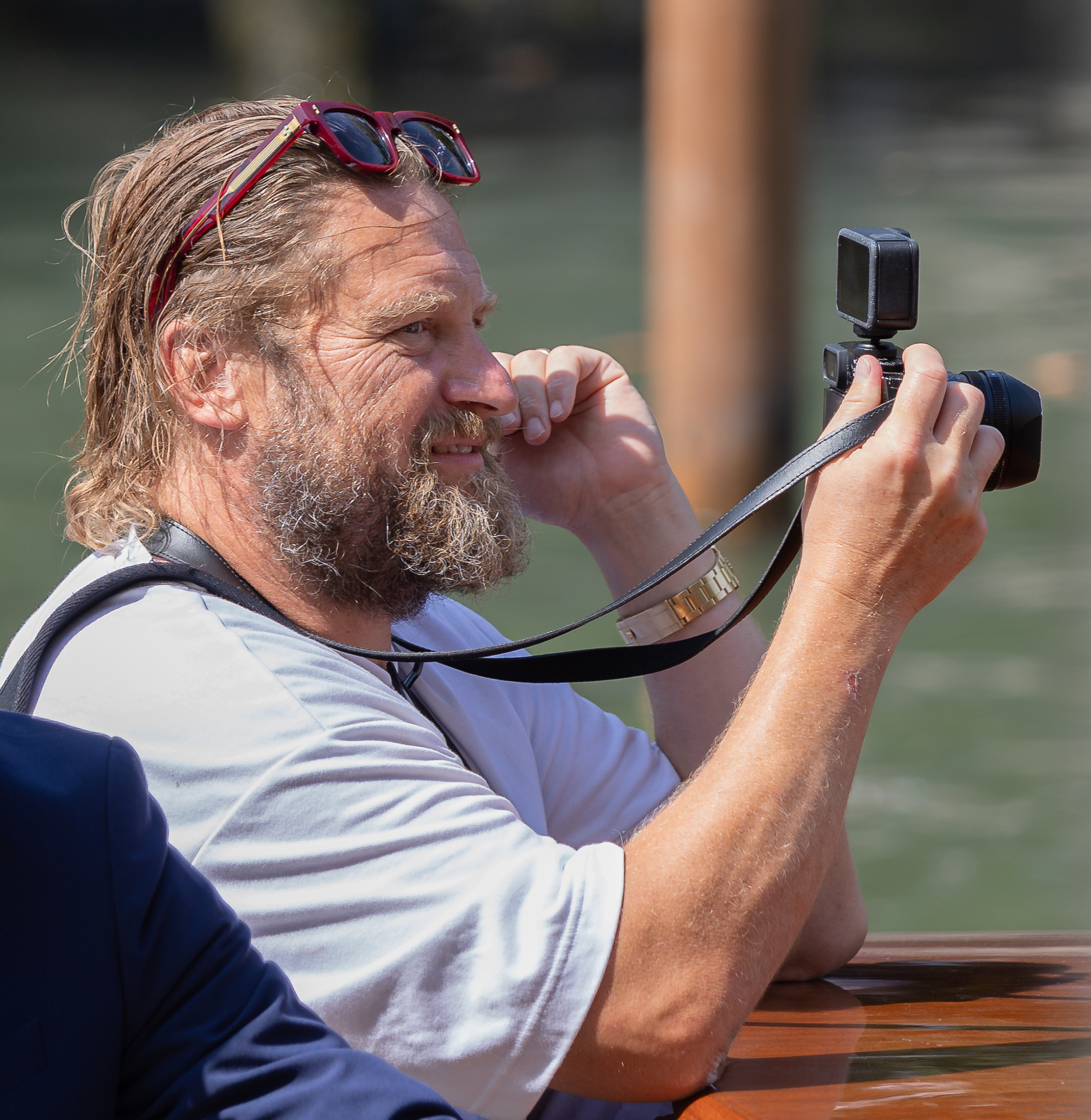
- Greg Williams at the 2024 Venice Film Festival
- Born: August 14, 1972 (age 53)
- Occupations: Photographer, director
- Spouse: Eliza Cummings (2019–present)
- Website: https://gregwilliams.com

Greg Williams (born 14 August 1972) is an English photographer and film director. He has done film and editorial photography and was an early user of digital video technology.

Williams began his career as a war photographer before moving into film and editorial work which has been featured in Vogue Italia, GQ, Vanity Fair and Esquire. He is the official photographer to the British Academy of Film and Television Arts. He has photographed on set and poster campaigns for the films Casino Royale, Quantum of Solace, The Bourne Ultimatum, Robin Hood and King Kong. His portrait subjects include Kate Beckinsale, Daniel Craig, Megan Fox, Robert Downey Jr. and Sean Penn. His advertising work includes poster campaigns for Omega Watches.

== Film director ==
Williams' debut feature film directing debut Samarkand starring Tom Hardy is in development with Solar Pictures. The script has been written by Williams and his brother Olly Williams. It concerns a Special Air Service soldier dealing with the complications of managing post-traumatic stress disorder in his civilian life., Williams previously directed Hardy in the 2011 short film "Sgt. Slaughter - My Big Brother".

== Books ==
Williams has published four books of film photos and one book of art photography. Bond On Set follows the 2002 James Bond film Die Another Day, Bond On Set: Filming of Casino Royale follows the production of 2006 Bond film Casino Royale, Bond On Set: Filming of Quantum of Solace follows the production of the 2008 Bond film Quantum of Solace and Bond On Set: Filming Skyfall follows the production of the 2012 Bond film Skyfall.

== Technology ==
Williams' use of a Red One digital camera to shoot Megan Fox for the cover of Esquire was the first use of a video camera still for portrait photography on a major magazine. His short film Tell Tale was the first project ever shot using a Red Epic camera capable of recording five-thousand lines of resolution. He has produced a number of 'Motos' (Moving phOTOS), for digital distribution. Notable examples include a Dunhill campaign featuring Jude Law, and the cover of Los Angeles Times Magazine's first iPad compatible digital issue.

== Personal life ==
Williams married model Eliza Cummings in August 2019.
