= Olly and Suzi =

British wildlife artists

Olly and Suzi (Olly Williams and Suzi Winstanley) are two British artists who specialise in collaborative painting of endangered wildlife. Olly and Suzi met at Saint Martin's School of Art in London, in 1987, and developed their unique art making technique on an exchange to Syracuse University in New York from 1988 to 1989. Here they graduated with a joint degree, despite protests from the board of directors.

At Syracuse, they learned about the Native American Mohawk/Haudenosaunee belief in "animals as brothers" which has been an integral part of their work since then. Olly and Suzi have spent almost 35 years travelling to the most remote parts of the world to paint and photograph wild animals in their natural habitat. Olly and Suzi collaborate closely with biologists, conservationists, and research scientists during their expeditions, to minimise their impact on the wildlife and to gain a deeper understanding of species they are working with. They value the complexity of mixing art and science and strive to show that the two can coexist and complement one another.

On their website, Olly and Suzi have said "Our art-making process is concerned with our collaborative, mutual response to nature at its most primitive and wild. Through live and direct interaction we aim to document the passing of animals, habitats and tribes that are here now but might not be for much longer. We make all our work in response to the natural world from first-hand experience, from ‘ground-truth’. In this way the bush has become our studio."

== Collaborative art ==
Collaborative art is an art form where two or more artists work together to create a piece. For Olly and Suzi, this also often includes their subject; the animal they are painting. Olly and Suzi travel to remote locations all over the world and track an animal that they eventually paint or draw. It does not always go exactly to their plan, they have had to learn over many years when the line is with big, dangerous animals, and be careful they do not cross it. They paint or sketch the animal on the same canvas at the same time. Their goal is to capture as much of the animal as possible. They try to portray the energy of their subject, whether it is frightened or inquisitive or indifferent to these people that have entered its territory. Olly and Suzi always try to get an interaction from their subject, whether it be a bite mark, lick, footprint, slither, or occasionally ruining the work completely. "One rhino ate the whole thing" Olly told The Guardian in an interview. Each artwork that Olly and Suzi complete is unique and captures the essence of the animal they are observing, and the environment in which they are painting it.

Since meeting in 1987, the pair have always worked around animals but the idea to have the subjects interact with the paintings occurred to them in 1994. For nearly three decades Olly and Suzi have been painting animals and attempting to get an interaction with each one, which can be seen in their first film Instinct which was made in their early years of their expeditions. Instinct is a short, 11-minute video that shows footage from Olly and Suzi’s early expeditions. It shows them creating art pieces, and animals interacting with them. Many of the works shown in Instinct were very successful in their interactions, for example a drawing of an elephant which was complimented with a footprint as the elephant came to have a look at the drawing. Some of the drawings were torn up by their subjects and dragged away into the bush. These interactions make each of Olly and Suzi's works unique, because there is always a chance that the painting will end up torn to shreds or be taken away completely.

== Notable achievements ==
Since 1993, Olly and Suzi have taken part in more than 50 expeditions to remote regions of the Earth to paint predators and prey close to one another in their natural habitats. BBC's Storyville documentary series made an episode about Olly and Suzi called "Wild Art: Olly and Suzi paint predators". The documentary shows their journey from art students in London, to full-time artists who travel and paint together for a living. It involves interviews with Olly and Suzi, and footage of many of their expeditions and paintings.

Olly and Suzi have also written a book called "Olly and Suzi: Arctic, Desert, Ocean, Jungle". They have featured in many newspaper articles, including The Guardian and The Independent.

Olly and Suzi's exhibition "Untamed" was featured in the Natural History Museum in London in 2001 and 2002. Their joint work has also been exhibited internationally in galleries including the Simon Dickinson and Briggs Robinson galleries in New York.

== Major works ==
Olly and Suzi's most famous work is a painting of a great white shark that was bitten in half when they offered it to the shark to get an interaction. This artwork was created by Olly and Suzi pushing the paint into the paper with their hands while they were underwater. After they were finished with the painting, they covered it in fish entrails in order to entice the shark and threw it back into the water. The shark came up and bit a chunk out of the painting, taking Olly and Suzi's signatures with it. Once it realised that the painting was not a fish, the shark spat the painting back out and swam away. Olly and Suzi were left with a painting that had been bitten in half, a spectacular photo taken by Olly's brother Greg Williams, and a very impressive story.

Another example is the work that Olly and Suzi have done in Tanzania. Over more than two decades they have been visiting and revisiting Mkomazi National Park in Tanzania to paint wild dogs. Over this time, they have developed a strong and intimate relationship with preservationists Tony and Lucy Fitzjohn. Suzi said in an interview, "Mkomazi has been incredibly important to us as artists. The park is near Kilimanjaro and last year we started a new body of work focusing solely on the landscape". In 2016 Olly and Suzi started on their work painting the landscapes of Tanzania, Mkomazi in particular. This was completely new to them, as it involved more painting in the studio – something they hadn’t done for more than 12 years. This shift in focus from painting the animals themselves to painting the landscape they live in, came about from a deep and intimate connection and understanding of the land. "[We took] sketches and photographs, and then we came back into the studio and the landscapes just happened" Suzi remembers. The work in Tanzania has shown a more deliberate focus on conservation of habitat alongside the wildlife. Olly and Suzi are still very interested in tracking and painting wildlife, but their Mkomazi landscapes are an example of their interest in more diverse art styles.

== Further examples of wildlife art ==
Visual art that shows endangered species has been an effective tool to capture people’s emotions and rally their support for decades. A particularly famous case of this was an article published by Forest and Stream magazine in 1894. The article was about the illegal poaching of buffalo – which were critically endangered – in Yellowstone National Park. Poaching had been an ongoing problem for many years before this, but nobody had paid it much attention. In 1894, Forest and Stream's article contained three photographs each showing dead buffalo in the snow: the first visual depiction of buffalo poaching. The photographs in this article caught the public eye, and in a matter of weeks legislation was passed to prevent poaching and protect Yellowstone National Park. There have been amendments to this law over time, but the Lacey Act still exists today. Animal art has changed drastically since the eighteenth century, when it primarily focused on the animal in its relation to humans. Most western art showing animals, created in the eighteenth century was of stock in a field, horses alongside men, and occasional depictions of exotic animals such as giraffes or tigers. Contemporary art by artists such as Olly and Suzi has turned this narrative around, giving the animals more depth and personality.

Olly and Suzi's aim is to capture the essence of an animal in their natural habitat. They try to get as much information about the animal as they can into each drawing. The intensity and adrenaline of their interactions with these animals is being captured in the art. Olly and Suzi are recreating what happened with Forest and Stream in the 1890s, giving a visual depiction of animals that the public are unlikely to see for themselves. Olly and Suzi's art is different to the buffalo photos though, as their paintings are full of vibrance and movement, capturing the emotions of the animal and the distress of human impacts.

Olly and Suzi's art style is different from what humans are taught to appreciate as visual art. It is messy, undefined and leaves the subject unframed. It is a celebration of wildness and authenticity, which captures the animal, its environment, and the emotions invoked in Olly and Suzi upon witnessing the animal. Their work goes against the Western world's expectation of art, in an attempt to show a deeper meaning and care for conservation and preservation of these animals they work so closely with.

== Personal life ==
Winstanley was in a long term relationship with English musician Damon Albarn until circa 2023 with whom she has a daughter named Missy.

== Bibliography ==
- Arctic, Desert, Ocean, Jungle, 2003, Harry N. Abrams, Inc. (ISBN 0810942666)
