= Nathan Westling =

American model

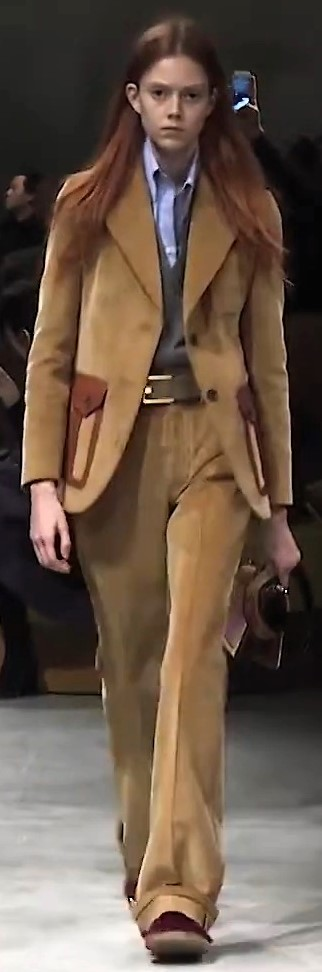
- Westling at the Prada Fall/Winter 2017 Men's & Women's Runway Show in Milan, Italy
- Born: Nathan Westling; June 1, 1996 (age 30); Scottsdale, Arizona
- Occupation: Model
- Years active: 2013–present
- Modeling information
- Height: 6 ft 0 in (1.83 m)
- Hair color: Auburn
- Eye color: Brown
- Agency: The Society Management (New York); Elite Model Management (Paris, Milan, London, Barcelona, Copenhagen); The Agency Arizona (Phoenix)

Nathan Westling (born Natalie Westling, June 1, 1996) is an American fashion model, and the star of the Spring 2014 Marc Jacobs and Saint Laurent Paris ad campaigns. His career began in 2014 when he had his hair dyed red for the Marc Jacobs campaign also featuring Miley Cyrus.

== Early life and career ==
Westling was born in Scottsdale, Arizona, on June 1, 1996, and assigned female at birth. He began his career as a model for female fashion, and was photographed by Steven Meisel for Prada, for the brand's Pre-Fall 2015 collection with Aya Jones, Willow Hand and Julia Nobis. Westling is most notable for dying his hair red for the Marc Jacobs campaign with Miley Cyrus. He also gained major exposure for his red-head tresses during New York Fashion Week 2014.

Westling was scouted by the Agency Arizona in Scottsdale, and soon after signed by The Society Management in New York City. He has walked in shows for Marc Jacobs which included opening the Spring 2014 show as an exclusive, Anna Sui, Céline, Jean Paul Gaultier, Fendi, Prada, Etro, Dries van Noten, Lanvin, Christian Dior, Vera Wang, Tommy Hilfiger, Chanel, Tom Ford, and DKNY amongst others.

In 2017, Westling was chosen as the debut model for their new model Crush series introduced by L'Officiel Malaysia.

== Personal life ==
In an interview with i-D magazine, Westling stated his dedication to the singles lifestyle, with the interview indicating: "Independence is important to Natalie, as it is to any 18-year-old. 'I'm living in my girlfriend's apartment now', [Westling] says, 'I'm glad to come back to New York and sort of have my own place'."

In March 2019, Westling came out as a transgender man. As noted in a CNN Style article, "After a decade spent receiving therapy and medication for depression, anxiety and anger issues, he finally decided to address what he'd always known to be the underlying problem. To do so, he decamped from his base in New York to Los Angeles to begin transitioning."
