= Olympia Campbell =

British fashion model and anthropologist

Olympia Louise Campbell
- Born: Olympia Louise Campbell; 23 October 1995 (age 31); Westminster, London, England
- Occupations: Model; evolutionary anthropologist
- Relatives: Sophie Hicks (mother); Roderick Hugo "Roddy" Campbell (father)
- Modelling information
- Height: 5 ft 8 in (173 cm)
- Hair colour: Brown
- Eye colour: Blue
- Agency: DNA Model Management (New York); VIVA Model Management (Paris, London, Barcelona)

Olympia Louise Campbell (born 23 October 1995) is a British fashion model and an evolutionary anthropologist. She was on the cover of Vogue Italia with her sister Edie.

== Early life ==
Campbell was born in Westminster, to architect and British Vogue editor Sophie Hicks and hedge fund manager Roddy Campbell. Her older sister is fashion model Edie Campbell. Campbell attended City of London School for Girls.

== Career ==
=== Modelling ===
Campbell has walked for Louis Vuitton, Sonia Rykiel, Burberry, Simone Rocha, Céline, Balmain, Chanel, Fendi, Emilio Pucci, Christopher Kane, Hermès, Paco Rabanne, Ralph Lauren, and Acne Studios.

Campbell is a feminist. She has spoken out about sexual harassment by fashion photographers.

=== Anthropology ===
Campbell received a PhD in evolutionary anthropology from University College London in 2023. She currently is a Research Fellow at the Institute of Advanced Studies in Toulouse and explores the correlates of gender-biased outcomes.

In 2025, she received the Margo Wilson award for the best paper published in Evolution and Human Behavior with her article Genetic markers of cousin marriage and honour cultures.
