= Glen Luchford =

British fashion photographer and film director

- Born: 1968 (age 57–58); Brighton, England
- Known for: Fashion photography, film
- Website: glenluchford.com

Glen Luchford (born 1968) is a British fashion photographer and film director. He lives and works in Venice, California.

== Life and work ==
A self-taught photographer, Brighton-born Luchford left school at 15 and moved to London, where he worked at a hair salon.

He worked as a photographer for The Face magazine at age 20. Luchford first signed with New York based agency Art + Commerce at the age of 24. He was one of the first photographers to collaborate with model Kate Moss. In 1997, he signed exclusively to Prada, and has since shot advertising campaigns for Yves Saint Laurent, Givenchy, Chloé, Lanvin, Calvin Klein, Gucci, Supreme_(brand), Willy Chavarria, Valentino_(fashion_house) and LVMH . He has collaborated extensively with British artist Jenny Saville with shows at the Gagosian Gallery. His editorial work has been featured in magazines such as The Face, Arena, i-D, and British, French, American, Italian Vogue magazines, Harper's Bazaar, and Self Service Magazine.

Luchford's style is influenced by his love of cinema. His signature look is to work with cinematic lighting, both on location and in studio.

In 2001, Luchford directed the film Here to Where, about a filmmaker wanting to make a film about a man stranded at an airport. Nominated for the Michael Powell award at the Edinburgh International Film Festival, the film is considered to be an inspiration for Steven Spielberg's The Terminal.

In 2009, Luchford joined artist management agency Art Partner.

Luchford collaborated with Alessandro Michele on the re-branding of Gucci after Michele's appointment as the brand's Creative Director in 2015. He photographed the designer's first campaigns, and created a brand new image of Gucci with Michele. His cinematic approach on the images took Gucci away from the sexualised campaigns of Michele's predecessor Frida Giannini and the Tom Ford era. He photographed Gucci's campaigns until Spring Summer 2020.

== Publications ==
- Jenny Saville & Glen Luchford: Closed Contact, Gagosian Gallery (2002)
- Glen Luchford (Steidl/Dangin, 2009)
- Damaged Negatives (2013)
- Glen Luchford: Pictorialism (2014). A retrospective.
- The Agony and the Ecstasy (2018)
- Glen Luchford: Prada 96-98 (2020)
- Roseland. London: Idea, 2023.

== Films ==
- Here to Where (2001) – director

== Exhibitions ==
- Gagosian Gallery Los Angeles with Jenny Saville, Closed Contact, 2002 https://gagosian.com/exhibitions/2002/jenny-saville-glen-luchford-closed-contact/
- Saddie Coles London, Here To Where, 2002 https://www.sadiecoles.com/exhibitions
- MoMA New York, Fashioning Fiction in Photography since 1990, 2004 https://www.moma.org/calendar/exhibitions/128
- Palais Galliera Paris, Coming Into Fashion, 2014 https://www.palaisgalliera.paris.fr/en/edition/coming-fashion-century-phothography-conde-nast
- Minsheng Art Museum Shagnghai with Gucci, No Longer/Not Yet, 2015 https://wwd.com/fashion-news/designer-luxury/guccis-no-longer-not-yet-exhibition-bows-in-shanghai-10264163/
- Thyssen Museum Madrid, Vogue: Like a Painting exhibition, 2015 https://www.museothyssen.org/en/exhibitions/vogue-painting
- MoMA New York, Björk, 2015 https://www.moma.org/calendar/exhibitions/1458
- Hangaram Art Museum Seul, Vogue: Like a Painting exhibition, 2017 https://www.angloinfo.com/seoul/events/listing/seoul-vogue-like-a-painting/78116
- Somerset House London , North Fashioning Identity, 2017 https://www.somersethouse.org.uk/whats-on/north
- Getty Museum Los Angeles, Icons of Style: A Century of Fashion Photography, 2018 https://www.getty.edu/art/exhibitions/fashion_photography/
- Dallas Contemporary Museum with Self Service magazine, 25 Years Of Fashion People and Ideas Reconsidered, 2019 https://selfservicemagazine.com/exhibition-2
- Museo Franz Mayer Mexico City, Vogue: Like a Painting exhibition, 2019 https://latinflyer.com/if-you-love-vogue-you-need-to-visit-mexico-city-right-now/
- The Civic Barnsley, North Fashioning Identity, 2019 https://fashionunited.uk/news/culture/north-fashioning-identity-to-open-in-barnsley/2019091245229
- Virtual Exhibition with Art Partner, Glen Luchford/Selected Works 1990-2020, 2020 https://www.artpartner.com/glen-luchford-selected-virtual-works-exhibition/
- Corso Como Milan Atlas, 2025 https://10corsocomo.com/en-gb/blogs/news/glen-luchford-atlas?srsltid=AfmBOop4QJfGKfNZP4tAistzr58gjE1u6b1_0pQXWBl6CZT8l8aKmpXh]
- Corso Como Seul Atlas, 2026 https://10corsocomo.com/en-gb/blogs/news/glen-luchford-atlas-arrives-in-seoul?srsltid=AfmBOoranLd92uoHVWQFFG1b8F9rGfprEgoMW1lq8JDrePr03IJF7CRn]
- The Mint Museum, Charlotte NC, Caravaggio, 2026, https://www.charlotteobserver.com/charlottefive/c5-things-to-do/article315397515.html
- Tate Britain London, The 90s: Art and Fashion, 2026 https://www.tate.org.uk/whats-on/tate-britain/the-90s?gad_source=1&gad_campaignid=23828487298&gbraid=0AAAAADxb_sTiSwGp6S9ygvgqM5E7xxBKm&gclid=CjwKCAjwoaLWBhAWEiwAnyitu1h5UpH8nFjVwxezqd33Dr1l6Vo1AvP5WUPA3vMtUYPY8RthocLyYxoChK8QAvD_BwE

== Permanent Collections ==
Luchford's work is held in the following permanent collections:

- Museum of Modern Art, New York: 2 prints (as of 4 January 2023)
- Victoria and Albert Museum, London: 47 prints (as of 4 January 2023)
- J. Paul Getty Museum, Los Angeles: 6 prints (as of 4 January 2023)
- Museum of Contemporary Art, Los Angeles
- The State Hermitage Museum, Saint Petersburg
