= Tyler Mitchell (photographer) =

American photographer (born 1995)

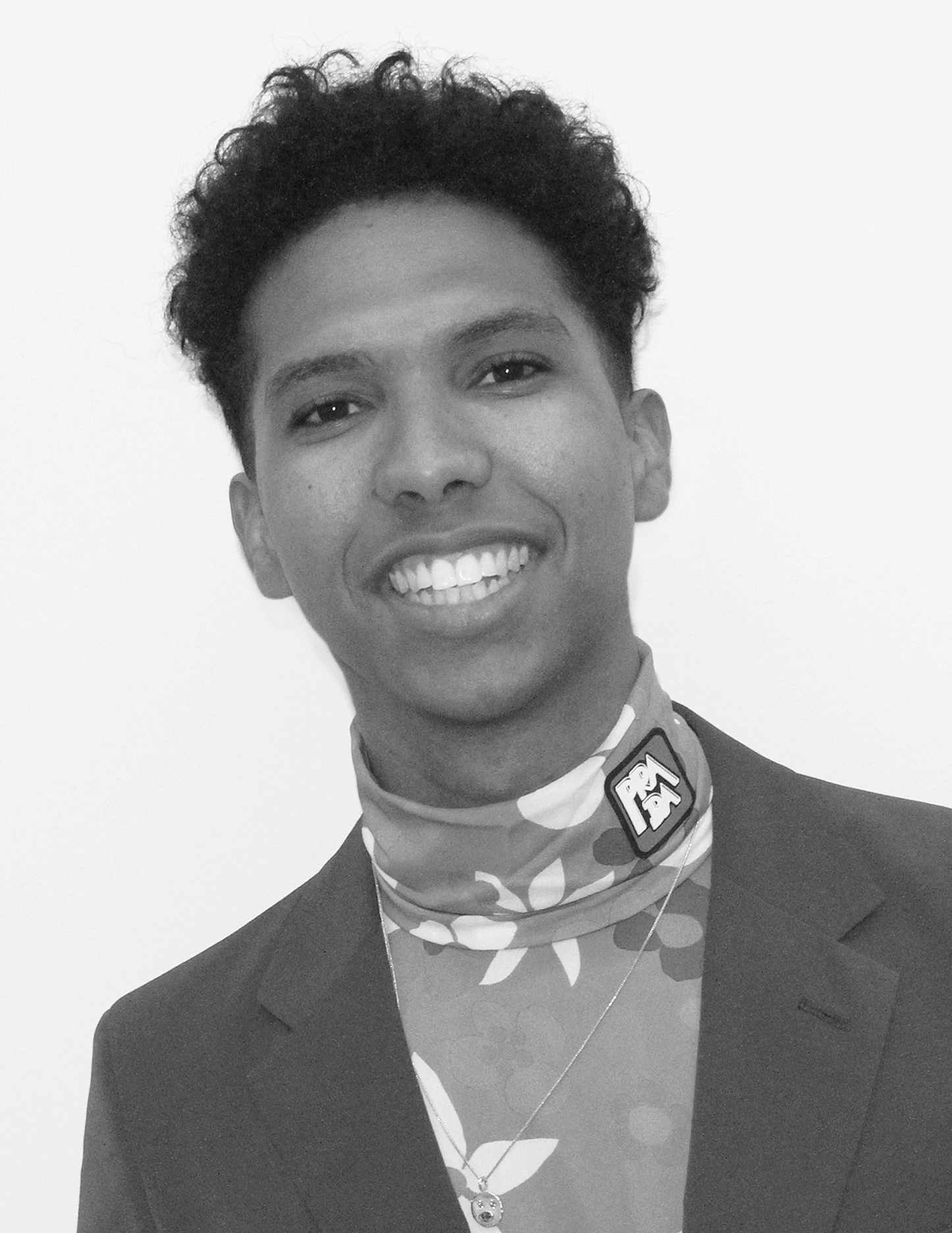
- Mitchell in 2020
- Born: April 12, 1995 (age 31); Atlanta, Georgia
- Education: New York University
- Occupation: Photographer
- Years active: 2014–present
- Website: tylermitchell.co

Tyler Mitchell (born April 12, 1995) is an American photographer. He is based in Brooklyn, New York, and is best known for his cover photo of Beyoncé for the cover of Vogue.

== Early life ==
Mitchell grew up in Marietta, Georgia. In ninth grade, he purchased a Canon camera and taught himself how to make skateboarding videos. He was inspired by Spike Jonze to learn how to make videos and taught himself how to edit through YouTube tutorials. Mitchell attended The Westminster Schools of Atlanta.

In 2015, Mitchell created and published his first book after visiting Havana, Cuba, on a six-week photography program. While there, he documented skateboarding life and the architecture in Havana and turned it into a 108-page book called El Paquete.

Mitchell attended New York University Tisch School of the Arts, where he studied cinematography in film and television. While at Tisch, he studied with Deborah Willis and graduated in 2017.

== Career ==
See Your Halo, the image used by American Vogue in 2018, on display in the National Portrait Gallery, Washington, D.C.

Before photographing Beyoncé for the cover of American Vogue's September 2018 issue, he got experience making and editing short films at home and also shot music videos for rapper Kevin Abstract during his freshman year of college. Additionally, Mitchell worked with Teen Vogue to document and photograph teen gun control activists for the magazine's digital issue. A couple months later, Mitchell became the first African American to photograph for the cover of American Vogue, and also one of the youngest photographers to do so. In 2019, the Smithsonian National Portrait Gallery acquired one of the portraits of Beyoncé by Mitchell for their permanent collection.

Mitchell has also shot for Marc Jacobs, JW Anderson, Converse, Nike, Givenchy and Loewe. His work includes fashion photography, artistic photography, and film projects, which include autobiographical topics and themes of identity.

In 2019, Mitchell had his first solo exhibition at the Foam Fotografiemuseum Amsterdam from April 19 to June 5 called I Can Make You Feel Good, which included video works, photographs, and installations. The exhibition traveled to the International Center of Photography in New York and was shown there until May 2020.

In 2021, Mitchell worked with curator Michael Rooks of the High Museum of Art on an exhibition themed around the culture of the Southern United States and Global South. Called Idyllic Space, it was produced with the help of curator Maria L. Kelly. Idyllic Space features photographs of black men, women, and children in various natural and domestic settings. According to Mitchell, these photographs are meant to evoke a utopian vision of black life, while inviting viewers to imagine their own "unreachable perfect".

Two of Mitchell's artworks, Untitled (Kiki and Stephan Dancing) and Untitled (Group Hula Hoop), appeared in "Worms," a season-four episode of The Bear, as framed pieces in Sydney Adamu's apartment. Mitchell did the photographs for Ayo Edebiri's November 2025 Vogue magazine cover story.

== Legacy and style ==
Mitchell has been praised for documenting nuanced expressions of black life, which he has referred to as a "Black utopic vision". His exhibition I Can Make You Feel Good features photographs of black people enjoying daily life, predominantly outdoors, which The New York Times asserts "challenges the art historical renderings of leisure time as the purview of the white gentry." He explores cultural reclamation in his professional work as fashion photographer.

== Exhibitions ==
- I'm Doing Pretty Hood in My Pink Polo, Red Hook Labs Gallery and Aperture Gallery, 2018
- Labs New Artists II (group exhibition), Red Hook Labs Gallery, Brooklyn, New York, June 2018
- The Way We Live Now (group exhibition), Aperture Foundation, New York City June – August 2018
- I Can Make You Feel Good, Foam Fotografiemuseum Amsterdam, April–June 2019
- I Can Make You Feel Good, International Center of Photography, Jan 2020 – May 2020
- Idyllic Space, High Museum of Art, June 2024 – December 2024
- Wish This Was Real, Maison européenne de la photographie, October 15, 2025 - January 25, 2026

== Books ==
- I Can Make You Feel Good. 2020. ISBN 9783791386089

== Awards ==
- Forbes 30 under 30 - Art & Style 2019
- British Fashion Council - New Wave Creative
- Dazed Digital - Dazed 100 2016
- BET - BET's Future 40 list 2020
