= Edie Campbell =

English model

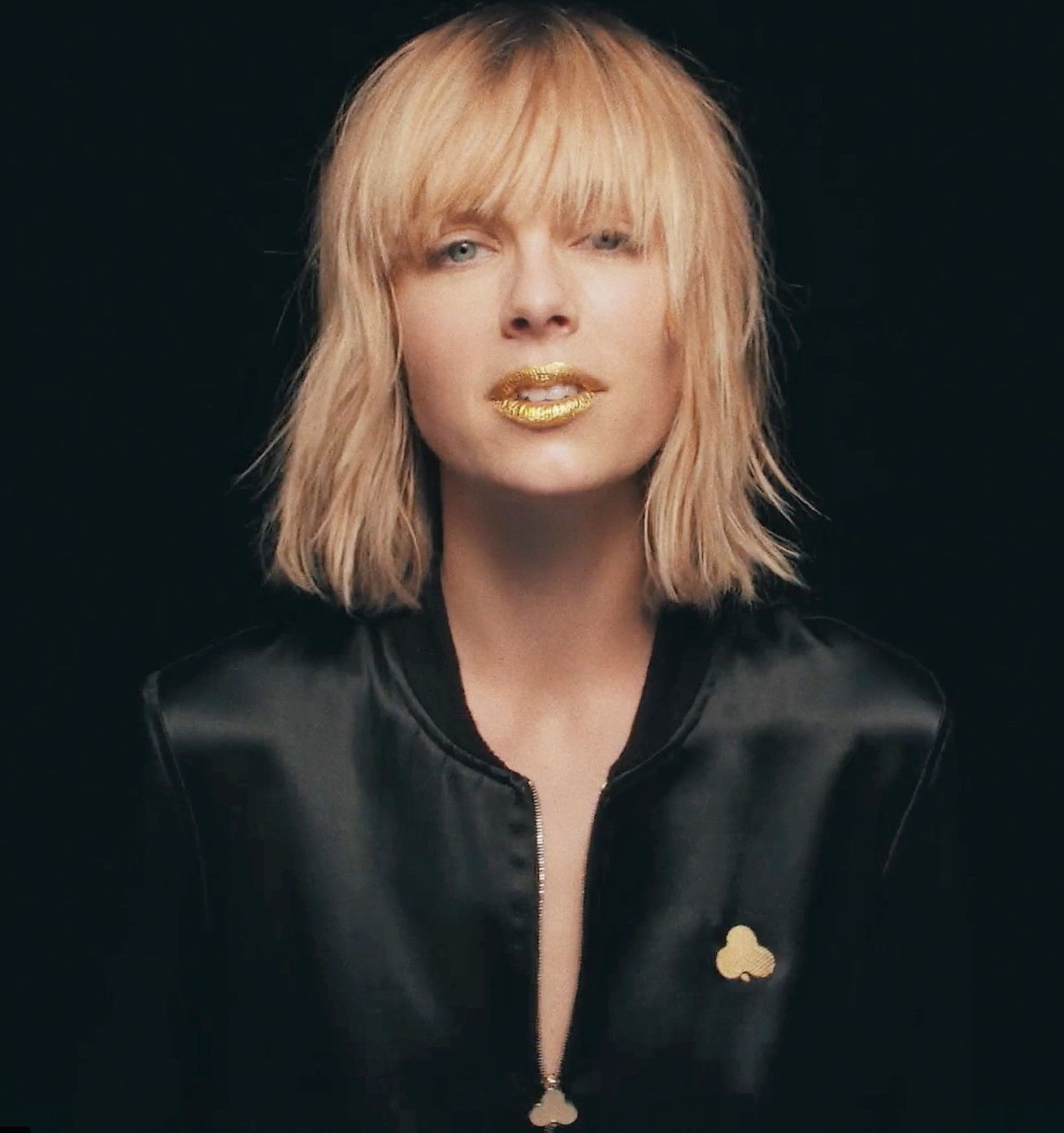
- Campbell in 2016
- Born: Edith Blanche Campbell
- Occupation: Musician
- Relatives: Sophie Hicks (mother); Olympia Campbell (sister)
- Modelling information
- Height: 5 ft 10 in (1.78 m)
- Hair colour: Dark blonde (naturally)
- Eye colour: Blue
- Agency: DNA Model Management (New York); VIVA Model Management (Paris, London, Barcelona); Priscilla's Model Management (Sydney)

Edith Blanche Campbell is an English model. In 2016, she made her second appearance on the cover of British Vogue. She has been a model for Chanel, Burberry and Hermès and is also an accomplished horse rider.

== Career ==
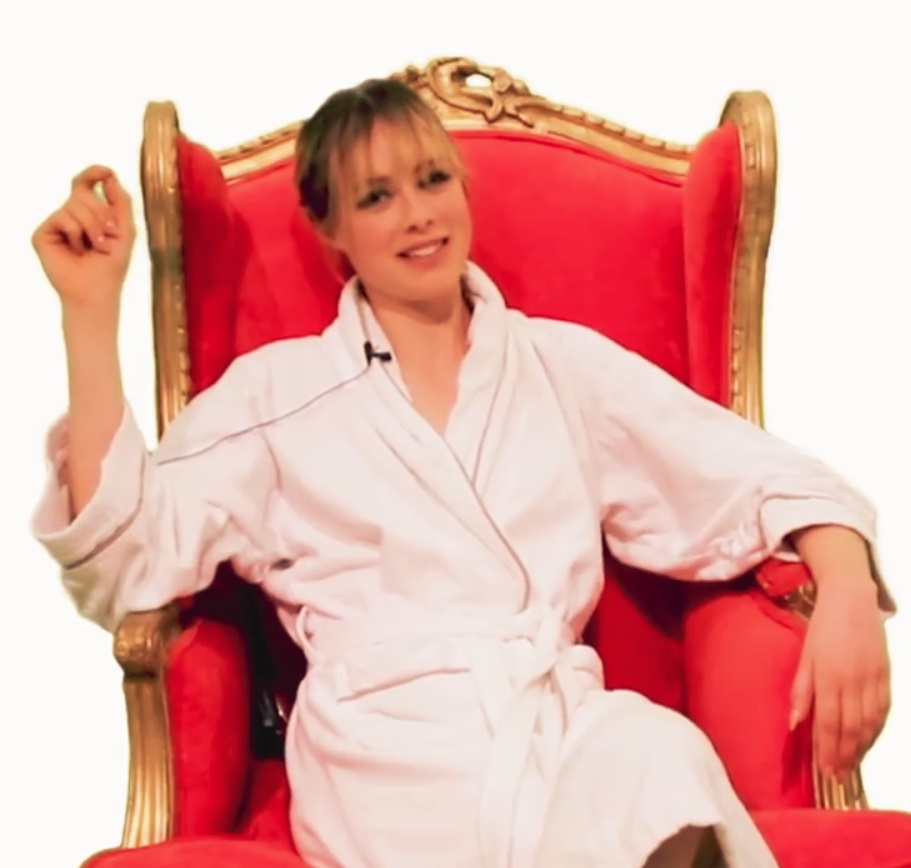
Campbell for Love magazine in 2017

Edith Blanche Campbell is a model. She started modelling after she appeared in a Vogue feature by Mario Testino, in a story about up and coming young Londoners. Mario Testino then went on to use her in a Burberry campaign alongside Kate Moss. Campbell is now represented by VIVA Model Management London.

Campbell has appeared in advertising campaigns for Burberry, Cacharel, Christian Dior, Marc Jacobs, Bottega Veneta, Karl Lagerfeld, Lanvin, Alexander McQueen, Hugo Boss, Yves Saint Laurent, Jil Sander and Louis Vuitton. She has walked the runway for prestigious fashion houses such as Burberry, Hermès, Chanel, Christian Dior, Calvin Klein, Balenciaga, Givenchy, Alexander Wang, Louis Vuitton, Paco Rabanne, Hugo Boss, Valentino, Marc Jacobs, Bottega Veneta, Sacai, Alberta Ferreti, Haider Ackermann, Stella McCartney, Alexander McQueen, Fendi, Versace, H&M, Jil Sander, Lanvin, Loewe, Mugler, Chloé, Celine, John Galliano, Miu Miu, Isabel Marant, Victoria Beckham, DSquared, Giles, Balmain, Etro, Jacquemus, Cacharel and Yves Saint Laurent, and has also been featured in fashion stories and cover shoots for publications such as Numero, Love Magazine, British Vogue, Italian Vogue, W and American Vogue. A long-standing favourite of Karl Lagerfeld, Campbell was given "one of the ultimate modelling accolades" when she closed the Chanel Spring/Summer 2012 couture show as the "bride". In the Autumn/Winter 2013 season, Campbell opened the Marc Jacobs, Jil Sander and Louis Vuitton show, whilst also opening and closing the Burberry show. She also featured in the Giles show in London and the Saint Laurent by Hedi Slimae show in Paris. Campbell opened Marc Jacobs' final show for Louis Vuitton in October 2013.

In 2013, Campbell was photographed for the cover of both the April British Vogue and Vogue Italia, as well as the May cover of Vogue Italia, alongside fellow British model Karen Elson. She was one of four covers of LOVE magazine's Autumn/Winter 2013 issue. Campbell starred on the cover of the German Vogue in the same year. In February 2014 Campbell appeared on four separate covers of Self Service magazine's 20-year special issue, the Spring 2014 cover of i-D magazine and the April cover of Vogue Japan. She also appeared on the July and September 2014 covers of Vogue Italia.

Campbell was named "Model of the Year" at the prestigious British Fashion Awards [BFA] in London, December 2013. The award was presented to her by top fashion photographer, Tim Walker, who has collaborated with her on many occasions. In 2013, Campbell also made her journalistic debut, writing a piece for Harpers Bazaar UK. Campbell has also been named as a Contributing Editor for the A/W 2014 issue of Love magazine. She is the face of the advertising campaign for the Yves St Laurent fragrance Black Opium.

In 2016, she made her second appearance on the cover of British Vogue, wearing pink for the first spring edition of the year for the magazine.

She was ranked by models.com as one of the icons in the fashion industry.

== Open Letter on Model Abuse ==
In November 2017 Campbell penned a historic "Open Letter on Model Abuse" in Women's Wear Daily addressing the fact that "we operate in a culture that is too accepting of abuse, in all of its manifestations" and urging the industry to put an end to systemic abuse and negligence. She deplored that fashion is a closed world, and fiercely self-protective writing “The real story is the enablers: The people who work with the abusers and don’t do anything."

In January 2018 Campbell took part in a question-and-answer season at London's Dover St Market hosted by Love magazine to take this discussion further.

== Personal life ==
Campbell grew up in Westbourne Grove, London. Her father is Roddy Campbell, a hedge fund manager; her mother is the architect, Sophie Hicks Her younger sister, Olympia, is also a model.

Campbell has been horse riding since she was five. She is an accomplished jockey, and took part in Glorious Goodwood in July 2011, becoming the first winner of the inaugural all ladies charity horse race, The Magnolia Cup, a feat she repeated on See the Storm in 2014. Campbell participated in the Gucci Masters equestrian event during December 2013.

She is also a keen event rider and competes in dressage, showjumping and cross country.

Campbell is a Young People Ambassador for The Reading Agency. She supports the MyVoiceUK programme which creates reading and writing experiences for and by young people.

Campbell lives in Northamptonshire with her horses in a home designed by her architect mother.

== Education ==
Campbell attended St. Paul's Girls' School in London. She later graduated from the Courtauld Institute of Art, University of London with a First Class Honours degree in History of Art.
