= Martine Sitbon =

French fashion designer

Martine Sitbon is a French fashion designer.

== Biography ==
After spending her childhood in Morocco and a short stay at the Lycée Chateaubriand in Rome (Chateaubriand High School in Rome), the young Martine Sitbon returned to Paris in the early 1960s with her family. In the early 1970s, Sitbon entered the Studio Berçot in Paris where she studied until 1974. Her appeal for traveling made her work as a freelance designer for various fashion houses around the world. She designed collections in India and Hong-Kong from 1976 to 1980.

In the early 1980s until 1985, Sitbon mainly worked between New York and Paris. Between 1984 and 1986, she designed collections in Milan as a freelance designer for Italian fashion houses. In Milan, Italian investors that had already launched the designer Romeo Gigli and who were scouting new designers to financially aid noticed her. This allowed Sitbon to present her very first fashion show in 1986 in Paris. In 1987, she was invited to present her first collection within the Cour Carrée du Louvre during Paris Fashion Week. That same season, she was invited to present a fashion show at the Palladium in New York City. That same year, Sitbon collaborated with the photographer Javier Vallhonrat and the artistic director Marc Ascoli in order to create catalogues, the visual identity and advertising campaigns for her brand. This collaboration lasted five seasons.

In 1988, she was appointed Creative Director in the luxury ready-to-wear French fashion house Chloé. She designed the collections during nine seasons in parallel to working for her own brand, Martine Sitbon. Sitbon's arrival happened during a time when Chloé was declining and smelled of dust. With Sitbon, the Chloé fashion house got a breath of fresh air: a strong visual identity incarnated by the supermodels of the time: Linda Evangelista, Christy Turlington, Claudia Schiffer, Helena Christensen... "Chloé had this thing where they began to pick up young designers and they carried on. I think it's really become part of the Chloé heritage…I was the first young girl to be a named designer for the house. And for me it was an incredible experience." (Martine Sitbon, interview with Sarah Mower, November 2012)

In 1990, Sitbon began collaborating with English photographer Nick Knight and Ascoli for the visual identity, the creation of the catalogues and the advertising image of her own brand. In 1993, she opened a new showroom in the Marais neighbourhood in Paris, 6 rue de Braque.

In 1996, Sitbon inaugurated her first store rue de Grenelle in a venue of over 200 square meters. She collaborated with graphic designers M/M Paris (Michaël Amzalag and Mathias Augustyniak) for the conception of the logo, the graphic identity and the invitations of the fashion house during eight seasons. Her style, which mixed a "rock attitude", Parisian chic and romanticism later named "rock'n'romantic", collected a faithful clientele. In 1997, Ascoli, M/M Paris, and Craig McDean were responsible for creating the autumn/winter 1997/98 collection catalogue. That same year, Sitbon was made Chevalier des Arts et des Lettres (Knight of Arts and Literature) by the French government. In 1998, she presented her autumn/winter 1998/99 collection during Tokyo Fashion Week at Tokyo Garden Hall in partnership with Onward Kashiyama. In 1999, Sitbon launched her men's collection simultaneously with the womenswear.

In 2000, she was made "President of the jury for Young Designers" during the International fashion and fashion photography festival in Hyères. During the festival, she presented an exhibition of her own work including a video of Jean-Baptiste Mondino featuring model Kirsten Owen. In 2001, she opened a Martine Sitbon boutique in Seoul, South Korea. That same year, and for just one year, Sitbon became Head Designer for Italian Women's ready-to-wear fashion house, Byblos. In 2002, she collaborated with Ascoli and photographer Vanina Sorrenti during three seasons for the Martine Sitbon brand. In 2003, she collaborated with Ascoli and Serge Leblon for the 2003/04 autumn/winter collection. In 2004, the Martine Sitbon label presented its last fashion show in the Matisse room of the Musée des Arts Modernes de la Ville de Paris (Museum of Modern Arts of Paris). In 2004, Sitbon encountered financial difficulties that would lead her to close her studio, her boutique and her label. She subsequently lost the commercial use of her name.

In 2006, she launched the brand Rue du Mail along with Sino-Canadian investor Jimmy K.W. Chan (CEO of Semeiotics Inc). Chan became the founder and CEO of Rue du Mail, and Sitbon its Head and founding Designer. In 2007, the Rue du Mail label opened its headquarters, named after the street where the brand's premises and head office are at, 5 rue du Mail on the right bank of Paris. The boutique, located in the same place as the studio, the showroom and the administrative office, was inaugurated in 2007; a gallery-like space of 700 square meters that gathered and put into sync all of the brand's activities. The boutique Rue du Mail opened in September 2007. The first fashion show of the new label Rue du Mail took place at the Couvent des Cordeliers during the autumn/winter 2007/08 Fashion Week in Paris. In June 2007, Sitbon curated issue number 5 of A Magazine. She was the first woman invited by the issue after Martin Margiela, Yohji Yamamoto, Haider Ackermann, and Undercover (Jun Takahashi) to be its chief editor. Sitbon brought together different artists and friends for this issue: Knight, McDean, M/M Paris, Andrée Putman, Anna Sui, Anita Pallenberg, Sofia Coppola, Marie Rucki, Tilda Swinton, Cédric Rivrain, Frédéric Sanchez, Jimmy Dine, Annette Messager, and Paul McCarthy. In 2008, Rue du Mail presented its collection at the École Nationale des Beaux Arts de Paris (National School of Fine Arts in Paris). In 2009, the label had its runway show for the second time at the Couvent des Cordeliers. However, from 2010 until 2013, Rue du Mail hosted its runway shows in its own headquarters.

In May 2012 Sitbon was named Chevalier de l'Ordre National du Mérite (Knight of the National Order of Merit) by the French government.

In 2013, Rue du Mail decided to suspend their activities until further notice. In 2014, Sitbon sponsored the master's degree of the Chambre Syndicale de la Couture parisienne (French Federation of Couture School). Also in 2014, Sitbon created all the uniforms for the Pullman Hotels in the scope of their repositioning towards high-end hospitality and their new development strategy. Sitbon's designs in her name as well as for the Rue du Mail label have been worn by many leading figures namely Cate Blanchett, Karin Viard, Gwyneth Paltrow, Kirsten Dunst, Scarlett Johansson, Vanessa Paradis, Emma Stone, Clémence Poésy and Swinton, who have all been seduced by her creations.
