= Adrienne Jüliger =

German fashion model

- Born: 6 June 1997 (age 29); Bonn, Germany
- Modeling information
- Hair color: Dark blonde
- Eye color: Blue-green
- Agency: DNA Models (New York); Viva Model Management (Paris, London, Barcelona); Why Not Model Management (Milan); AM Modelmanagement (Dormagen) (mother agency)

Adrienne Jüliger is a German fashion model.

== Career ==
Jüliger was discovered outside a taping of Germany's Next Topmodel and debuted at Prada S/S 2015. In her debut New York Fashion Week she walked in 20 shows.

She has walked for Etro, Vera Wang, Coach, and Michael Kors.

Jüliger has been on the cover of Glamour Germany, Elle U.K., Miss Vogue, and i-D. In addition to Prada, she has appeared in campaigns for DKNY, Red Valentino, H&M, Zara, and John Frieda.

Jüliger was once ranked as a "Top 50" model by models.com.
