= Willow Hand =

American fashion model and equestrian (born 1998)

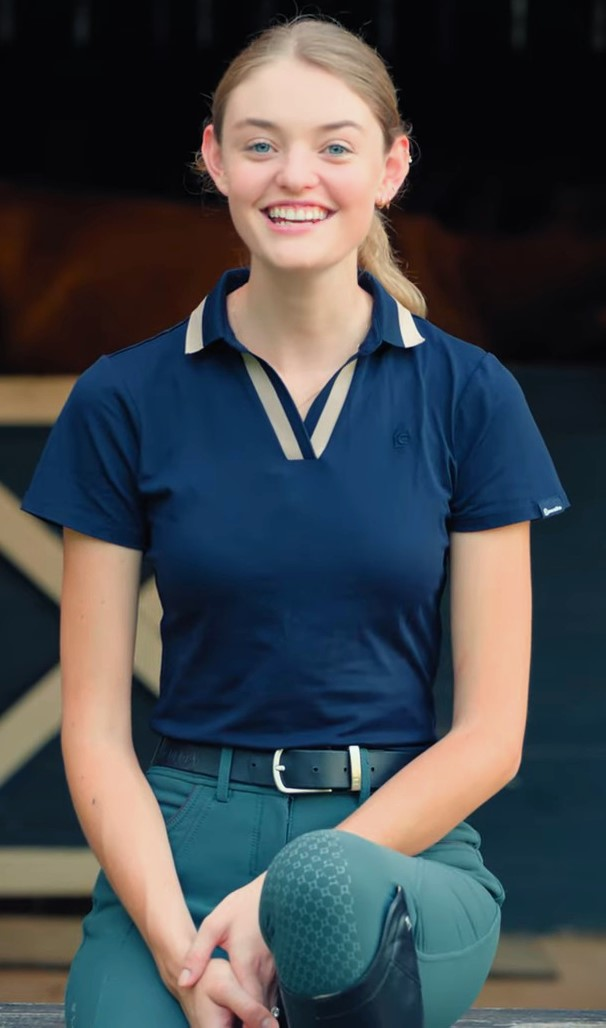
- Hand in 2023
- Born: Marion County, Florida, U.S.
- Occupations: Fashion model; equestrian
- Years active: 2015–present
- Modeling information
- Height: 1.79 m (5 ft 10 1/2 in)
- Hair color: Blonde
- Eye color: Blue
- Agency: Elite Model Management (New York); Women Management (Paris); Monster Management (Milan); Kult (London); New Version Model; Management (Hernando); allflower Management (Dallas)

Willow Hand is an American fashion model and equestrian. She is best known for opening Prada's fall/winter 2015 ready-to-wear fashion show at 16 years old and walking in the 2018 Victoria's Secret Fashion Show.

== Early life ==
Willow Hand was born and grew up in Florida, United States and was scouted at the age of 12 while helping out in her parents' store.

== Career ==
Hand's first fashion show was opening for Prada for whom she was a debut exclusive at the Autumn/Winter 2015 Milan Fashion Week. The following week, she was at Paris Fashion Week where she walked for Miu Miu.

In 2015, she was named by Elle Magazine as one of eight breakout stars. She was listed as one of fifteen up-and-coming American models to watch.

She has walked the runway for Prada, Miu Miu, Gucci, Louis Vuitton, Anna Sui, Valentino, Chanel, Dolce & Gabbana, Fendi, Alexander McQueen, Vera Wang, Diane von Fürstenberg, Zac Posen, Tory Burch, Carolina Herrera, Prabal Gurung, John Galliano, Thakoon, Sonia Rykiel, Missoni, Oscar De La Renta, Tommy Hilfiger, Victoria Beckham, Chloé, Rochas, Jil Sander, Fausto Puglisi, Fay, Paco Rabanne, Maison Margiela, DSquared2, MSGM, Philosophy di Alberta Ferretti, Giambattista Valli, Roberto Cavalli, Francesco Scognamiglio, No 21, Mary Katrantzou, Michael Kors, Rodarte, and Topshop.

She has done campaigns for Prada, Anna Sui, Bottega Venetta, Zara, Benetton, Jill Stuart and Victoria's Secret Pink. Hand was chosen to be featured by Free People as a Muse and shot for their catalogue.

She has been in editorials for Vogue Paris, British Vogue, Vogue Italia, Teen Vogue, Vogue Russia, Vogue Japan, Vogue Ukraine, Vogue China, Vogue Mexico, Vogue Spain, Vogue Thailand, Allure, Russh, Garage, Dazed, Numero Tokyo, and In Print magazine.

In 2018, Hand walked for Victoria's Secret Fashion Show 2018.

Her look has been compared to that of a Disney princess.

== Personal life ==
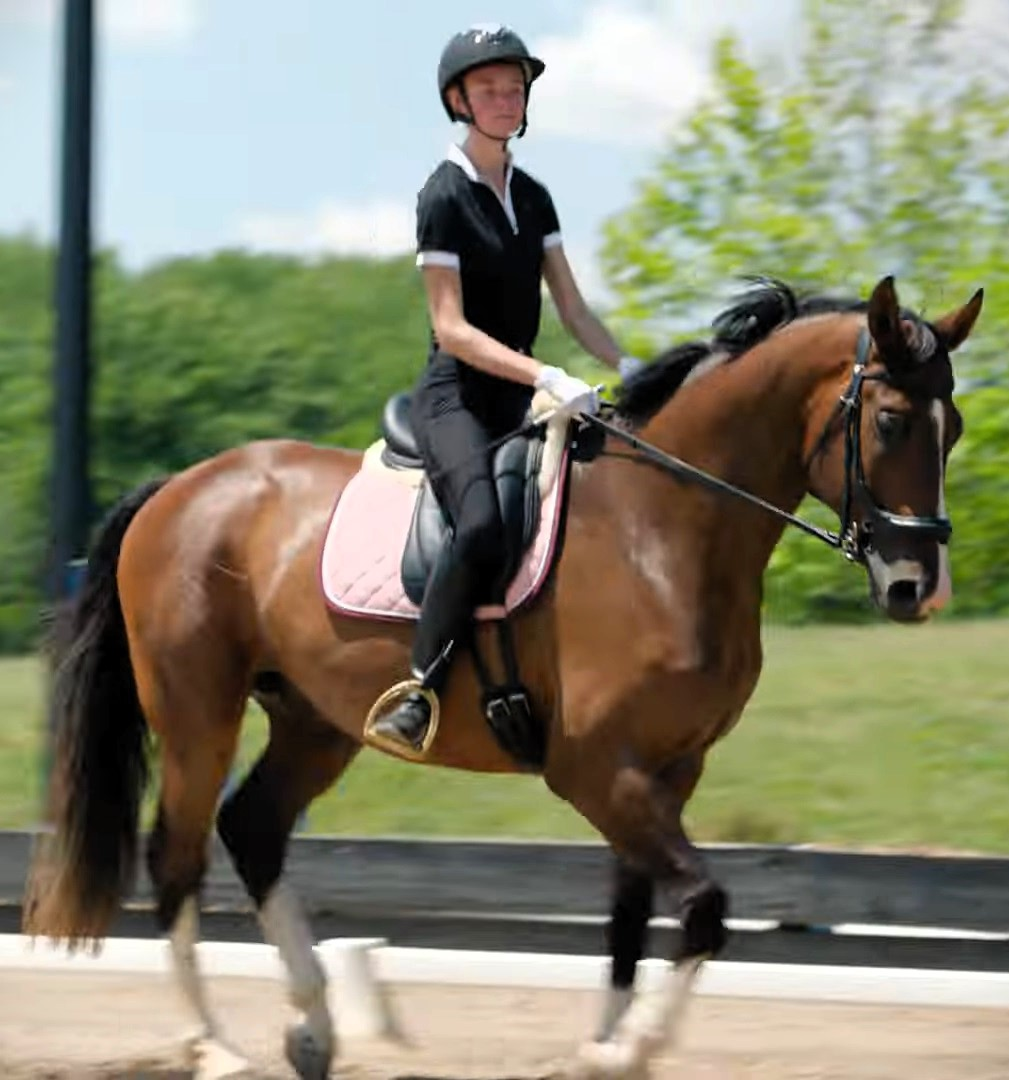
Hand riding in 2023

Hand plays the ukulele, guitar and piano. She also sings. Hand has expressed interest in becoming a theatre actress. She is also an accomplished equestrian. She and her horse Santiago have won several championship ribbons.
