= Kelly Mittendorf =

American model

- Born: Kelly Linden Mittendorf; June 14, 1994 (age 31); Scottsdale, Arizona
- Occupation: Model
- Modeling information
- Hair color: Brown
- Eye color: Green/Blue

Kelly Linden Mittendorf (born June 14, 1994) is an American fashion model and PR coordinator.

== Early life ==
Mittendorf was born and raised in Scottsdale, Arizona. She left high school after booking a Prada ad when she was 16 (she received the call during math class).

== Career ==
Mittendorf debuted in the Fall 2011/2012 advertising campaigns for Prada, and with runway appearances for Anna Sui, Giles, Loewe, Mulberry, Topshop, and most notably closing the Spring 2012 Marc Jacobs show.

Mittendorf has been featured in magazines including British Vogue, Vogue Italia, Marie Claire (USA, China, Hong Kong), i-D, L'Officiel, Harper's Bazaar (Thailand, China), Love, Dazed, V Magazine, and Elle (Mexico, Malaysia).

Mittendorf mostly retired in 2015.

== Personal life ==
Mittendorf describes herself as an advocate of models' rights.

She studied mass communication and media studies at Arizona State University.

Mittendorf lived in Bushwick, Brooklyn.
