= Collier Schorr =

American artist and fashion photographer (born 1963)

Collier Schorr (born 1963 as Patrice) is an American artist and fashion photographer best known for adolescent portraits that blend photographic realism with elements of fiction and youthful fantasy.

Schorr grew up in Queens, New York and studied journalism at the School of Visual Arts. In the 1980s and 1990s she also worked actively as an art critic. Her photography work was featured in the 2002 Whitney Biennial and the 2003 International Center for Photography Triennial. In 2008 she received a Berlin Prize by the American Academy in Berlin. Collier Schorr is represented by Stuart Shave/Modern Art, London and 303 Gallery, New York. She currently resides in Brooklyn and spends her summers with family in Schwäbisch Gmünd, in Southern Germany.

Her work explores a multitude of themes, including history, nationality, and war, with an emphasis on identity and gender. Her influences include Barbara Kruger, Cindy Sherman, and Laurie Simmons, along with German and Jewish social history, World War II, wrestling, painter Andrew Wyeth, and German photographer August Sander.

== Early work ==
From the beginning of her photography career in 1986 to about 2014, Schorr's work was primarily seen in a number of solo exhibitions, along with published books to aid in further exploration of various overarching themes.

By incorporating documentary, fantasy, and an occasional interweaving of different media, Schorr dissected the concepts behind identity politics in an age of feminism. She was heavily influenced by the androgyny of 1980s fashion, and utilized the momentum it generated to create art that drew upon elements of fashion photography while also interrogating other cultural boundaries. Though her recent work is featured in fashion magazines, her earlier photographs would easily fit there as well.

There I Was, a gallery show at the 303 Gallery in New York and book released in 2009, is a perfect example of Schorr's abilities to push the limits of medium and perspective. Drawing on her experience with the drag car racer Charlie Snyder and his surprising death in Vietnam, Schorr questions everything regarding reportage, memory, and the inability to recreate the past. She combines drawings, photos, and cut-up magazines to create a collage of information that conveys her thoughts about the disconnect between the photograph, the viewer, and the subject.

Ultimately, Schorr's early work represents her exploration of feminism, identity, sexuality, and gender during a period wherein these concepts were being questioned on a larger cultural scale. Through her personal touches and combination of media, Schorr exalts the underrepresented to find her own place in society.

== Recent work ==
Although Schorr continues her exploration of adolescent androgyny, her photographic platform fully transitioned to fashion magazines by 2014. Her earliest fashion photography was featured in such publications as Purple Magazine and i-D, and focused on clothing rather than on artistic photography. Her later photography would combine the two by utilizing popular culture icons. She recently photographed newly famous adolescent actors Finn Wolfhard and Millie Bobby Brown for Dazed magazine, highlighting their physical similarities. Other pop culture icons Schorr has worked with include Timothée Chalamet, Janelle Monáe, and Jodie Foster, and further explores androgyny and removes the subject from stereotypical depictions of gender.

Schorr's work expresses a viewpoint that is neither masculine nor heterosexual. Much of her work comes from a place of altering perception, either looking deeper into what is considered normal or altering the usual context of an idea in order to create a commentary on the subject.

In 2019, Collier Schorr received the Royal Photographic Society Award for Editorial, Advertising, and Fashion Photography, with an Honorary Fellowship of the Society.

== Notable works ==
=== Jens F. ===
First exhibited at the 2002 Whitney Biennial, and then featured at the 303 Gallery in New York in 2003, Jens F. features a myriad of photographs, sketches, and notes regarding the image of a young German boy. Using Andrew Wyeth's depictions of the model Helga from the late 20th century as a template, Schorr depicts male Jens as an androgynous and emotional figure. The obvious juxtaposition of genders and the boy's acknowledging gaze conveys the idea that modern sexuality is being challenged with confidence.

=== Forests and Fields ===
After living in the small town of Schwabisch Gmund, Germany for 12 years, Schorr has created Forests and Fields in order to explore the composition of the environment, its inhabitants, and herself. The collection was first presented as a complete exhibition at the 303 Gallery in 2001, focusing on images that varied from young boys dressed in Nazi uniforms to deliberately designed still-lifes of nature. In a nod toward August Sander's 1930s work, Schorr later expanded the project into multiple books, each focusing on a different aspect of her overall idea.

==== Volume 1: Neighbors ====
Neighbors was published in 2006 as the first volume of Forests and Fields, and mainly focuses on ambiguous portraits. Schorr manipulates themes of nationality, identity, and history to create a scrapbook-like composition of images that toes the line between documentary and fantasy. An exhibition titled Badischer Kunstverein took place in 2007 to accompany this volume.

==== Volume 2: Blumen ====
Moving away from portraits, Blumen focuses on the German landscape. By manipulating small aspects about everyday natural objects, Schorr comments further on the relationships between the German town and the citizens themselves, all while adding in overtones of fantasy.

=== Wrestlers ===
In 2002, Schorr visited Blairstown, New Jersey, and West Point, New York to photograph their wrestling teams in action. Her goal in capturing these images of vulnerability, struggle, and the pain was to reveal the undiscovered duality of wrestling. While being an undeniably masculine sport, it possesses romantic and feminine elements that push it into the realm of androgyny and gender fluidity. Schorr hopes to compile the photos into an art book titled Wrestlers Love America in the future.

=== 8 Women ===
8 Women was exhibited at the 303 Gallery in 2014, consisting of 14 works of eight women accumulated over the past twenty years. With a combination of headshots, full-body nudes, action poses, and a drawing, Schorr conveys a sense of feminine power that neither objectifies the subjects nor dates the photos. By consistently incorporating elements of fashion photography, Schorr is able to comment on how representation and hyper-sexualization functions in both fashion and feminist culture today.

== Publications ==
- Jens f. Göttingen: Steidl Mack; London: Thames & Hudson, 2005.ISBN 3865211569. A compilation of photographs of a young boy developing into a man through poses similar to those of Andrew Wyeth's painted Helga.
- Neighbors = Nachbarn. Schorr. Göttingen: Steidl Mack, 2006. ISBN 3865213030. A historical and fictional story told through photographs about a small town in Germany where apparitions reside. She pieces together a tale of her own family tree through "memory, nationalism, war, emigration, and family".
- Male: From the collection of Vince Aletti. Schorr. New York: PPP, 2008. ISBN 0971548064. Photography critic/curator Vince Aletti's amassed collection of work of male bodies with an essay from Schorr, describing how these pieces have influenced her own work and the acceptance of gay men into art history.
- There I was. Schorr. Göttingen: Steidl, 2008. ISBN 3865216161. Using her father's and Charlie Astoria Chas Snyder's photos, her own sketches, and vintage car ads, Collier weaves together a story of the young drag racer's death in Vietnam and the complexity of a photograph's perspective.
- Blumen. Schorr. Göttingen: Steidl Mack, 2010 ISBN 3865216870. A second addition to her previous book about the small town in Germany, Neighbors. This focuses less on figures and more on the natural landscape of the village that Schorr has inhabited for the past 13 years.
- 8 Women. Schorr. London: Mack, 2014. ISBN 190794642X. A collection of her work from the mid-nineties to 2014, focusing on the female's perspective of women "who want to be looked at", like models, musicians, and artists.
- Collier Schorr: I Blame Jordan. Long Island City, NY: MoMA PS1, 2015. ISBN 0989985954. A compilation of photographs taken of model Jordan Barrett for the MoMA PS1.
- August. London: Mack, 2022. ISBN 978-1-913620-70-7.

== Solo exhibitions ==
- The Chase, 303 Gallery, New York, NY, 1990
- 303 Gallery, New York, NY, 1991
- 303 Gallery, New York, NY, 1993
- 303 Gallery, New York, NY, 1994
- 303 Gallery, New York, NY, 1997
- 303 Gallery, New York, NY, 1999
- Emily Tsingou Gallery, London, 2000
- 303 Gallery, New York, NY, 2001
- 303 Gallery, New York, NY, 2004
- Forests & Fields, Badischer Kunstverein, Karlsruhe, Germany, 2007
- There I Was, 303 Gallery, New York, NY, 2007
- Jens F, Museum of Contemporary Art Denver, CO, USA, 2008
- There I Was, Le Consortium, Dijon, France, 2008
- Blumen, Villa Romana Prize, Florence, Italy, 2008
- German Faces, Berardo Collection (as part of PHotoEspaña), Lisbon, Portugal, 2010
- Journals & Notebooks, 303 Gallery, New York, NY, 2010
- 8 Women, 303 Gallery, New York, NY, 2018

== Collections ==
- Burger Collection, Hong Kong, China
- Fondazione Sandretto Re Rebaudengo, Turin, Italy
- Hammer Museum, Los Angeles, CA, USA
- Henry Art Gallery, Seattle, WA, USA
- The Jewish Museum, New York, NY
- The Museum of Modern Art, New York, NY
- North Carolina Museum of Art, Raleigh, NC, USA
- Rubell Family Collection, Miami, FL, USA
- San Francisco Museum of Modern Art, San Francisco, CA, USA
- Wadsworth Atheneum Museum of Art, Hartford, CT, USA
- Walker Art Center, Minneapolis, MN, USA
- Whitney Museum of American Art, New York
