= Top Shop =

1998 video game

- North American cover art.
- Developer(s): KID
- Publisher(s): PlayStation; KID^{JP (1998)} Success^{JP (1999)} Agetec^{NA} Sega Saturn; KID^{JP}
- Series: A1 Games^{NA} SuperLite 1500^{JP}
- Platform(s): PlayStation, Sega Saturn
- Release: PlayStation; JP: February 11, 1998; NA: February 21, 2001; SuperLite 1500; JP: July 22, 1999; Sega Saturn; JP: February 11, 1998
- Genre(s): Board game
- Mode(s): Single-player, multiplayer

Board Game Top Shop, known in Japan as Tenant Wars (テナントウォーズ, Tenanto Wōzu), is a video board game developed by KID for the PlayStation and Sega Saturn. Although both releases were published in Japan, only the PlayStation version was issued in North America where it was given an "E" rating by the ESRB.

== Gameplay ==
The gameplay of Top Shop mimics that of Monopoly, but expands on the property management aspect of that game. As in Monopoly, players move across a game board in accordance to the number they roll on a die, purchase unowned properties when they land on such and earn money when they reach the bank. Rolling an "E" triggers a random event, while landing on an elevator space can affect the direction in which the player moves.

Top Shop deviates from Monopoly when players land on spaces owned by other players. Instead of paying rent, the landing-player must buy an item from the owner-player's store. Items cost varying levels of money, and when one buys them they disappear from the store and must be restocked by the owner. In addition, when an item is bought the buyer may receive "cash back" and/or a random number of points which can be used at the bank to buy various special events, such as "Random Money Exchange" or "Win the Game". When neighboring spaces are purchased by the same player, a larger shop with greater stock capacity and more available expensive items is built. Stores themselves can only be bought from other players when they are sold out of all their goods and can only be restocked by their owners when they land on the store, unless a special event allows otherwise.

In addition to multitap support, Top Shop features eight maps, eleven characters, and forty-four shops. It can be played in either story or free play mode.

== Reception ==
Reception

Review scores
Publication	Score
Famitsu	25/40
Game Informer	7.5/10
Official U.S. PlayStation Magazine	4/5 stars

The PlayStation version received favorable reviews. In Japan, however, Weekly Famitsu gave it 25 out of 40, citing the game's simplicity as both a benefit and detractor.
