= Frida Giannini =

Italian fashion designer (born 1972)

- Born: 1972 (age 53–54); Rome, Italy
- Occupation: Fashion designer
- Years active: 1997–present
- Labels: Fendi (1997–2002); Gucci (2002–2015)
- Spouse: Patrizio Di Marco (2015–2019)
- Children: 1

Frida Giannini (born in Rome, 1972) is an Italian fashion designer. She was the creative director of the Italian fashion house Gucci from 2006 to 2014.

== Education ==
Giannini studied fashion design at Rome's Fashion Academy.

== Career ==
After brief stints at small, family-run accessories companies, she joined Fendi in 1997, to design ready-to-wear. After three seasons, she was promoted to designer of leather goods.

In 2002, Giannini joined Gucci as design director of handbags. In 2004, she was appointed to head women's accessories when Tom Ford departed the company. At the time, Gucci stores focused its inventory on the "GG" monogram canvas bag. Giannini attempted to change Gucci's style from Tom Ford's designs by drawing from Gucci's heritage. Based on the 1960s Grace Kelly scarf, she developed the "Flora" collection of colorful bags. The collection was not well received by critics. In 2006, Women's Wear Daily commented: "Trends do not start here." However, Flora proved to be Giannini's first commercial success, and she applied the style to other accessories, including ballet shoes. In 2006, Giannini was promoted to Creative Director for the entire Gucci label.

Giannini continues to design from heritage. For example, the 2010 Winter Men's line was noted for influences from Gucci's equestrian history. However, Giannini says, "I don't think it is a nostalgic collection, but heritage is good for me—going back to the archives, but looking forward to the future." In 2011, she created, in collaboration with Lapo Elkann, the Fiat 500 by Gucci, a special edition of the Italian car. She was credited for softening Gucci's brand proposition from Tom Ford's porno-chic to sensual, with hints of Art Nouveau and fin de siècle, and to have introduced the brand's androgynous stance that Alessandro Michele later fully developed.

On 12 December 2014 Kering SA announced Frida Giannini and Patrizio di Marco will be leaving the company. Giannini saw the fall/winter collection through to the Milan Fashion Week and departed in early 2015. Her successor is Alessandro Michele.

== Film work ==
In 2013 Giannini designed costumes for Olivia Wilde and Chris Hemsworth in the film Rush.

== Philanthropy ==
Giannini has for years supported UNICEF, receiving in 2011 the UNICEF Women of Compassion award. In 2013, together with Beyoncé Knowles and Salma Hayek, she and Gucci launched Chime for Change, created with the goal of supporting women's and girls' education, health services and justice.

Giannini has been a member of the board of Save the Children since 2017, for which she has made field trips to Jordan and Syria. For a humanitarian project in partnership with retailer OVS in 2018, she created a Christmas capsule collection of sweaters benefiting Save the Children.

== Personal life ==
Giannini married Patrizio Di Marco on 5 June 2015; their daughter Greta was born in 2012. The couple separated in 2019.

Giannini collects vinyl records, with her collection currently at 8,000.

== Media ==
The life and work of Giannini was the subject of 2013 film The Director - An Evolution in Three Acts, directed by Christina Voros and starring James Franco.

== See also ==
- List of fashion designers
