= Paolo Roversi =

Italian-born fashion photographer (born 1947)

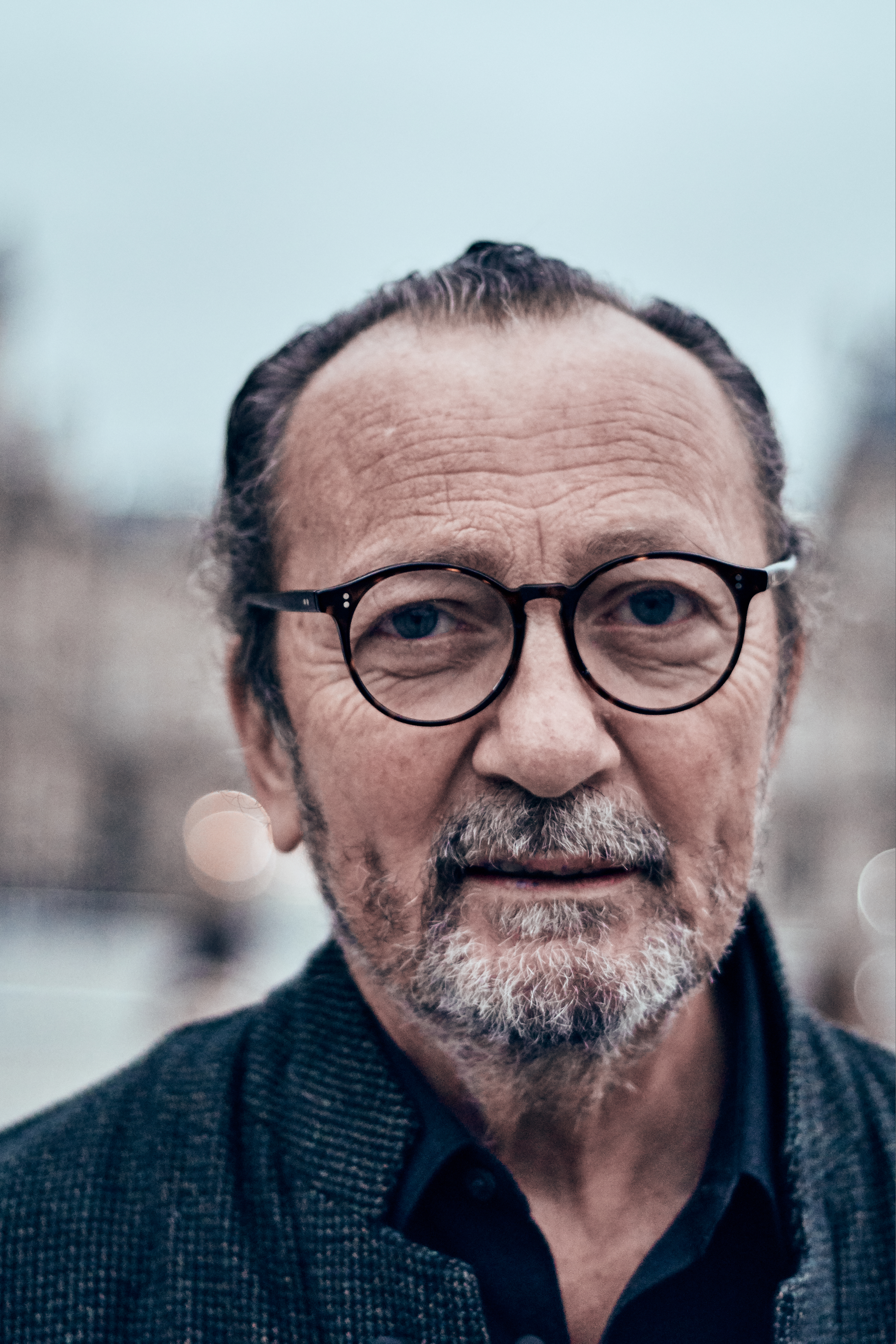
- Roversi in 2018
- Born: 25 September 1947 (age 79); Ravenna, Italy
- Occupation: Fashion photographer

Paolo Roversi (born 25 September 1947) is an Italian-born fashion photographer who lives and works in Paris.

== Early life ==
Born in Ravenna on 25 September 1947, Paolo Roversi's interest in photography was kindled as a teenager during a family vacation in Spain in 1964. Back home, he set up a darkroom in a convenient cellar with another keen amateur, the local postman Battista Minguzzi, and began developing and printing his own black-and-white work. The encounter with a local professional photographer, Nevio Natali, was very important: in Nevio's studio, Roversi spent many hours completing an important apprenticeship as well as building a strong, durable friendship.

== Career ==
In 1970, he started collaborating with the Associated Press: on his first assignment, AP sent Roversi to cover Ezra Pound's funeral in Venice. During the same year, Roversi opened, with his friend Giancarlo Gramantieri, his first portrait studio, located in Ravenna, via Cavour, 58, photographing local celebrities and their families. In 1971, he met by chance in Ravenna Peter Knapp, the Swiss fashion photographer and legendary artistic director of Elle magazine. At Knapp's invitation, Roversi visited Paris in November 1973 and has never left.

In Paris, Roversi started working as a reporter for the Huppert Agency, but little by little, through his friends, he began to approach fashion photography. The photographers who really interested him then were reporters. At that moment, he didn't know much about fashion or fashion photography. Only later, he discovered the work of Avedon, Penn, Newton, Bourdin, and many others.

The British photographer Laurence Sackmann took Roversi on as his assistant in 1974.

Sackmann was very difficult. Most assistants only lasted a week before running away. But he taught me everything I needed to know in order to become a professional photographer. Sackmann taught me creativity. He was always trying new things even if he did always use the same camera and flash set-up. He was almost military-like in his approach to preparation for a shoot. But he always used to say "your tripod and your camera must be well-fixed but your eyes and mind should be free".

Roversi endured Sackmann for nine months before starting on his own with small jobs here and there for magazines like Elle and Depeche Mode until Marie Claire published his first major fashion story.

Roversi's career has since bloomed to include celebrity and fashion photography. He has been a regular contributor to American Vogue, and Vogue Italia, W, Vanity Fair, Interview and i-D. He has also photographed advertising campaigns for Yohji Yamamoto, Comme des Garçons, Dior, Cerruti, GIADA, Yves Saint Laurent, Valentino and Alberta Ferreti.

== Technique ==
Roversi has said of his technique:

My photography is more subtraction than addition. I always try to take off things. We all have a sort of mask of expression. You say goodbye, you smile, you are scared. I try to take all these masks away and little by little subtract until you have something pure left. A kind of abandon, a kind of absence. It looks like an absence, but in fact when there is this emptiness I think the interior beauty comes out. This is my technique.

He is known for shooting with 8x10 Polaroid film, and claimed to buy as much as he could find before it was discontinued.
