= Kirsten Owen =

Canadian-born English fashion model (born 1970)

- Born: 22 November 1977 (age 48); Montreal, Canada
- Occupation: Model
- Years active: 1987–present
- Modelling information
- Height: 5 ft 11 in (1.80 m)
- Hair colour: Blonde
- Eye colour: Blue
- Agency: Ford Models (New York); Oui Management (Paris) d'management group (Milan); Select Model Management (London); Le Management (Copenhagen, Stockholm); Public Image (Montreal)

Kirsten Owen (born November 22, 1970) is a Canadian-born English fashion model.

== Career ==
=== Rise to prominence ===
After being scouted in Toronto, Owen began modelling at the age of 9. In 1987 she appeared on the cover of Elle in three different countries (Spain, France and Italy). However, after this amazing breakthrough, Owen did not immediately launch herself into modelling. In fact, it was two more years before when she got another big break, appearing on the cover of the French version of Marie Claire magazine in July and October 1989 and on the cover of i-D magazine in 1990. Later that year she also walked in Milan for Jil Sander's runway, while in early 1991, her face was once again featured on the cover of Elle, this time in an editorial. After this, it would be another five years before Owen would work again.

When Owen once again began working it was in a show in Milan for Prada in February 1996. After this, things began to pick up as she became the face of Helmut Lang and was again featured in an Elle editorial in January 1997. A month later Kirsten found herself in demand as she walked in shows in Paris and New York for Chloe, Dries van Noten, Yohji Yamamoto, Calvin Klein, and Helmut Lang. That same year Owen was featured in an editorial of Vogue Italia and appearears on the cover of the same magazine two months later. In 1999 she continued this success by becoming the face of Fendi. Kirsten Owen was also on the catwalk of Milan and Paris in September of that year, also worked for Dolce & Gabbana, Lanvin, Yves Saint Laurent, and Louis Vuitton.

She signed a contract to become the face of Emanuel Ungaro, was in a print advertisement for Donna Karan, and was in a French Vogue editorial. Her career continued to rise as over the next three years she walked for the likes of Givenchy, Jean Paul Gaultier, Chanel, Donna Karan, Marc Jacobs, Moschino, Rochas, and Burberry all in the early months of 2001.

=== Retirement and return to modelling ===
In 2001, Owen pulled back from modelling, only doing a couple of jobs in 2002 and 2003. Three years later, in May 2007, she returned to the catwalk (at the age of twenty-nine) to close the Paris show for Kenzo. While Owen had mostly retired, she made a comeback in 2008 and returned to modelling as a primary face for Givenchy. She also replaced Victoria Beckham to become the new face of Marc Jacobs and signed on with Calvin Klein to work on his new fragrance campaign "one." Owen also made an appearance on the runway at New York Fashion Week and featured in an editorial for i-D.

In 2010, she appeared again on the runway during Toronto Fashion Week for Joe Fresh.
