= April Bloomfield =

British chef

- Born: 1974 (age 51–52); Birmingham, West Midlands, England
- Education: University College Birmingham
- Culinary career
- Cooking style: New American
- Rating: (Michelin Guide)
- Current restaurant: Sailor
- Previous restaurants: The Hearth and Hound; The John Dory Oyster Bar; Salvation Taco; The Spotted Pig; Tosca Cafe; The Breslin; The Driskill
- Website: aprilbloomfield.com

April Bloomfield (born 1974) is a British-American chef who has opened two New York restaurants: The Spotted Pig (closed January 26, 2020) and The Breslin Bar & Dining Room. Bloomfield had previously worked at several restaurants in the United Kingdom, including The River Café and Bibendum.

== Early life and education ==
Bloomfield was born in Birmingham, West Midlands in England. Her father was an engineer, while her mother worked from home for Halcyon Days Ltd, painting bomboniere. She originally wanted to become a police officer but changed her mind when she discovered that she had missed out on the police cadet scheme. She then decided to attend catering college alongside her sister, where she realised that cooking was a career she wanted.

Following college, she began working at the Holiday Inn in Birmingham before moving to London to work at Kensington Place and later at Bibendum. She moved to work in Northern Ireland but soon returned to London. After working at several more restaurants, she started working at The River Café after she secured a position there through a friend. She credits her time at the River Café with Rose Gray and Ruth Rogers as being the time which taught her to cook.

== Career ==
Whilst at the River Cafe, she was scouted by American chef Mario Batali following Jamie Oliver's suggestion, to open a bistro-style restaurant in New York City. She was flown out to New York, where she was offered the job after a ten-hour interview with Batali, which saw the pair eat at a variety of the restaurants in the city. After spending the summer working at Chez Panisse to familiarise herself with American ingredients, she moved to New York in the autumn of 2003, and opened the gastropub The Spotted Pig with business partner Ken Friedman. The restaurant went on to win a Michelin star in 2005, the first time a specific list had been produced for New York City.

She opened a second restaurant, located in the Ace Hotel New York, called The Breslin, which later also won a Michelin star. She also opened an oyster bar in the hotel called The John Dory Oyster Bar. Bloomfield and Friedman then opened "Salvation Taco" in the Pod 39 Hotel in New York City, followed by the revitalisation and reopening of "Tosca Cafe" in San Francisco. In February 2016, Bloomfield and Friedman opened "Salvation Burger" in the Pod 51 Hotel in Midtown East.

== Spotted Pig scandal ==
In December 2017, her co-owner at The Spotted Pig, Ken Friedman, was accused of sexual harassment in the New York Times. The article's authors interviewed many employees who said April Bloomfield knew about everything happening at the Spotted Pig. "Several other employees say they also brought their complaints and concerns about Mr Friedman to Ms Bloomfield. Her response was always the same. "That's who he is. Get used to it. Or go work for someone else." April also acknowledged her restaurant's third-floor nickname, 'the rape room'." Friedman subsequently resigned from management duties of their restaurant group, and eventually Bloomfield posted a Twitter apology for "not protecting her staff".

Bloomfield and Friedman later separated as business partners, and Bloomfield went public with a defence of her silence in those years due to allegedly working in an abusive environment herself, including being threatened with having her green card revoked by Friedman if she did not co-operate with him in every way.

== Sailor ==
Bloomfield opened a new restaurant, Sailor, in September 2023 in the Fort Greene section of Brooklyn. It is a collaboration with restaurateur Gabriel Stulman. Pete Wells of The New York Times gave Sailor 3 stars in a 2023 review. He later included the restaurant on his 2024 list of the one hundred best restaurants in New York City.

== Honors ==
Bloomfield is notable for achieving the highest score of any single challenger in Iron Chef America history, accomplishing the feat during her 56–53 victory over Michael Symon in 2008.

As of the 2012 Michelin Guide, she is one of ten female chefs in the United States to hold a Michelin star. She lost the star a few years later.

== Published works ==
- Bloomfield, April (2012). A Girl and Her Pig. New York: Ecco. ISBN 978-0-06-200396-6.
- Bloomfield, April (2015). A Girl and Her Greens. New York: Ecco. ISBN 978-0-06-222588-7.
