= Ken Friedman (restaurateur) =

Restaurateur

Ken Friedman is a restaurateur.

== Biography ==
Before becoming a restaurateur, Friedman worked for twenty years in the music industry including time as an executive at Arista Records. He worked in A&R.

In 2016, he was named outstanding restaurateur of the year by the James Beard Foundation. His partnership with chef April Bloomfield is one of the reasons he was “one of the nation’s top restaurateurs.” Notable for The Spotted Pig, they also owned The John Dory Oyster Bar, Breslin Bar & Dining Room, Salvation Taco and White Gold Butchers. Friedman was also involved with the creation of the restaurant Horses in Los Angeles, where he helped get the initial lease, despite the fact he “is not listed on the lease, the restaurant’s opening operating agreement, or the operating agreement for the LLC that now oversees the restaurant.”

While at The Spotted Pig with Mario Batali in December 2017, Friedman was accused of sexual harassment. The third floor of the restaurant was reportedly nicknamed "the rape room" among employees.

In early January 2020, he agreed to pay 11 former employees US$240,000 (equivalent to $299,000 in 2025), and a 20% share of profits for the next 10 years. After he decided to “step away” from the Spotted Pig, they closed about three weeks after the settlement, negating the profit sharing component of the settlement with his victims.

Liz Johnson (chef/owner), partner Aghajanian and Stephen Light acknowledge his initial assistance with Horses but deny current involvement saying he “is in no way involved with Horses as an owner, partner, or previous investor”. Friedman claims to be a profit sharing owner and silent partner.

Bloomfield and Friedman also owned restaurants in California such as Hearth & Hound in LA and Tosca in San Francisco. The Tosca chef and business manager tried to buy Tosca after the allegations were made against Friedman, but the purchase fell through and the pair left in the May 2018. In June 2018, Bloomfield bought out Friedman's shares of Hearth & Hound and Tosca.
