= Vevers =

Vevers is a surname. Notable people with the surname include:

- Lorna Vevers (born 1981), Scottish curler
- Stuart Vevers (born 1973), English fashion designer
