= Reed Krakoff =

American fashion designer

- Born: February 20, 1964 (age 62)
- Occupations: Fashion designer, businessman
- Known for: Former creative director of Coach, Inc. founder of Reed Krakoff label
- Spouse: Delphine Krakoff
- Children: 4

Reed Krakoff (born February 20, 1964) is an American fashion designer and former creative director of Coach and his own eponymous brand.

== Early life and education ==
Krakoff was raised in Weston, Connecticut, one of three children, to Robert L. Krakoff, former chief executive officer and chairman of Nielsen Business Media, and Sandra Krakoff (née Gusky), a consultant, both originally from Pittsburgh, Pennsylvania.

He graduated from the Parsons School of Design.

== Career ==
Krakoff worked at Ralph Lauren Corporation for five years and then took a job as creative director at Tommy Hilfiger Corporation. In 1996, Coach’s Lew Frankfort hired Krakoff, and gave him control of Coach’s products, advertising, store design, and merchandising. In 2010, he launched his own brand, Reed Krakoff.

In April 2013, he announced he would leave Coach to focus on developing the Reed Krakoff label. The label folded in 2015 and began a process of winding down its operations and liquidating its assets. Krakoff then assumed the newly created position of Chief Artistic Officer at Tiffany & Co. following the departure of Francesca Amfitheatrof as Design Director. In his new position, Krakoff was designing new collections, aimed at refreshing the brand and targeting younger consumers. In early 2021 after LVMH's acquisition of Tiffany & Co., he was let go. He was named to the newly creative position of Creative Chairman of John Hardy in September 2022.

== Personal life ==
He is married to Delphine Krakoff, an interior decorator. They have three children. He and his wife bought Lasata in East Hampton, New York, the girlhood home of Jackie Onassis in 2006. In 2007, Reed sold his NYC townhouse to Roger Waters for $15 million. In April 2014, with his wife he bought heiress Huguette Clark's French-style chateau known as "Le Beau Chateau," that sits on 52 wooded acres in New Canaan, Connecticut for $14.3 million. At the time, the home had been sitting empty for more than 60 years.
