= Bonnie Cashin =

American fashion designer (1908–2000)

- Born: September 28, 1908; Oakland, California
- Died: February 3, 2000 (aged 91); Manhattan, New York City, U.S.

Bonnie Cashin (September 28, 1908 – February 3, 2000) was an American fashion designer. Considered a pioneer in the design of American sportswear, she created innovative, uncomplicated clothing that catered to the modern, independent woman beginning in the post-war era through to her retirement from the fashion world in 1985.

== Early life ==
Cashin was born on September 28, 1908 in Oakland, California to Carl Cashin, a photographer and inventor, and Eunice Cashin, a dressmaker. The family lived in several towns in northern California during Cashin's early years, and in each, her mother would open a custom dress shop. In a 1973 interview, Cashin explained her interest in fashion: "My mother was a dressmaker and before I could write I could sew."

Cashin attended Hollywood High. During high school, Cashin was hired by a Los Angeles ballet and theatrical revue company, Fanchon and Marco, to help make costumes for its productions. After she graduated in 1925, Cashin became its full-time designer.

== Career ==
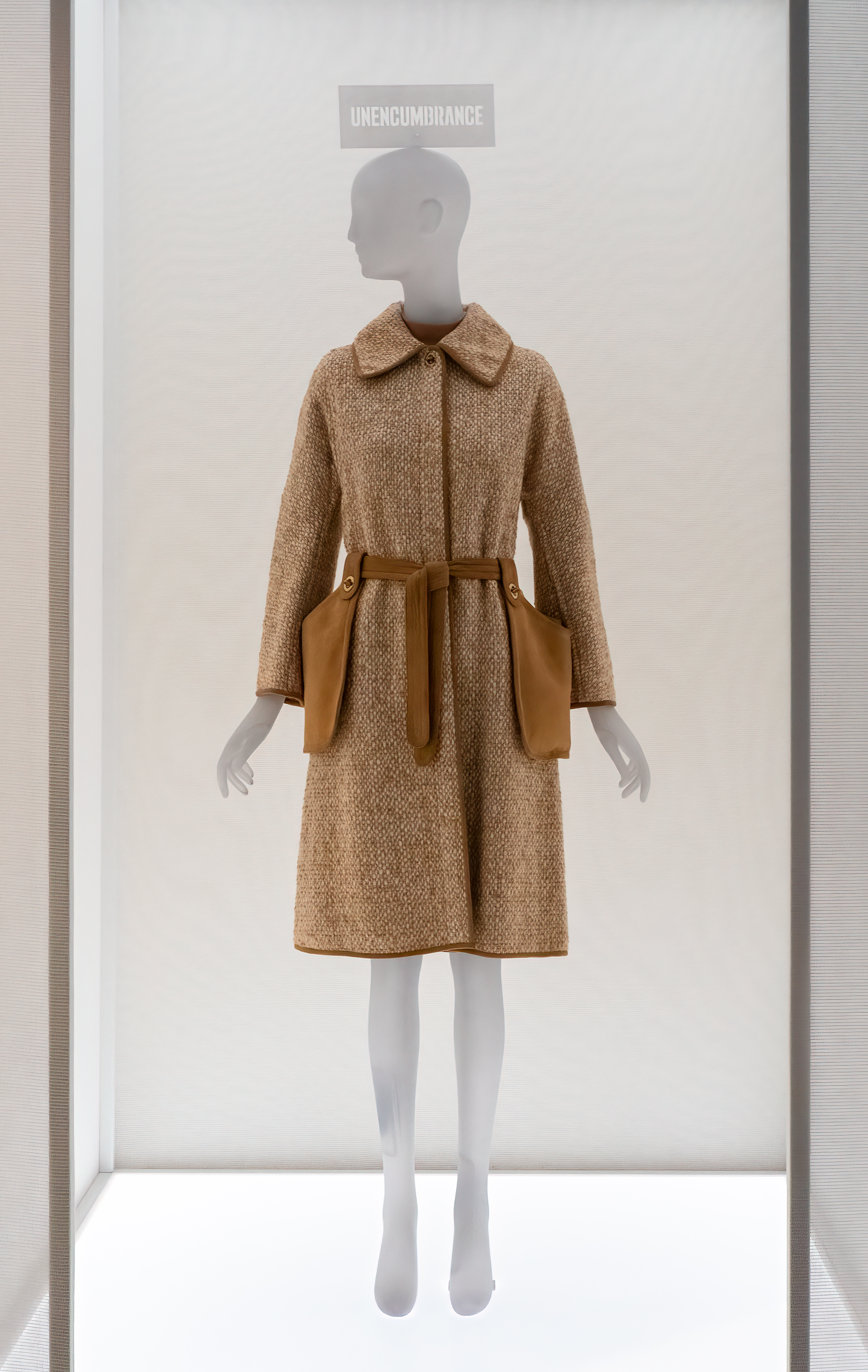
An ensemble designed by Cashin in 1973 for Philip Sills & Co., on display at the Metropolitan Museum of Art exhibit, In America: A Lexicon of Fashion

In 1934, Cashin moved with the ballet company to New York City to work at the Roxy Theater, where she created three costume changes per week for each of the theater's 24 dancers, known as the "Roxyettes." Owing to her deceivingly youthful appearance, Variety is reported to have described Cashin as "the youngest designer to ever hit Broadway."

In 1937, at the urging of Harper's Bazaar editor Carmel Snow, sportswear manufacturer Louis Adler offered her a job. She was hesitant to accept, stating, "The profit-conscious, business-like atmosphere of Seventh Avenue seemed very different to me from the atmosphere around the theater. I felt more at home with dancers, actors, artists, musicians, writers--people like that--than I did with most of the business men I met in the clothing industry."

While in New York, Cashin studied at the Art Students League of New York.

After the U.S. entered World War II, Cashin designed uniforms for women in the armed forces.

=== Hollywood costume design ===
In 1943, Cashin returned to Hollywood and costume design. After producer William Perlberg recruited her, Cashin joined 20th Century Fox and created clothes for about sixty films including Laura (1944), Anna and the King of Siam (1946), A Tree Grows in Brooklyn (1945), and Junior Miss (1945).

Cashin enjoyed the work in Hollywood, explaining: "I wasn't designing for fashion, but for characteristics, which is the way I like to design clothes for daily wear. I like to design clothes for a woman who plays a particular role in life, not simply to design clothes that follow a certain trend, or that express some new silhouette."

=== Ready-to-wear ===
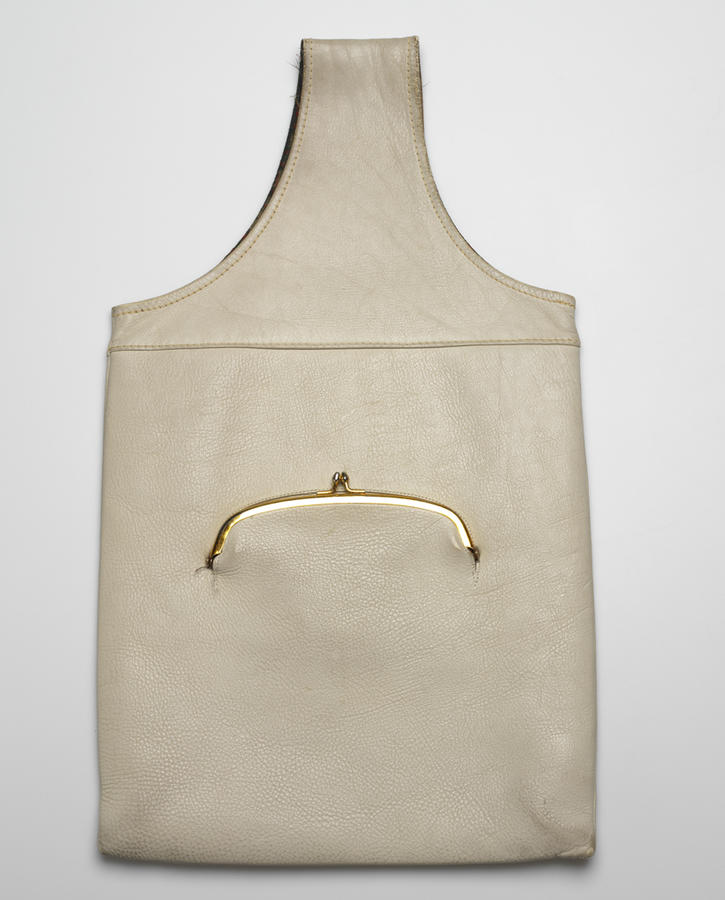
1962 'Cashin Carry' bag designed for Coach, cream leather (RISD Museum)

In 1949, Cashin returned to New York City. There, she designed the first sportswear collection with her name on the label for her previous employer, Adler and Adler.

In 1950, her introduction of the term and concept of "layering" led to winning both her first Coty Award as well as the Neiman Marcus Award, an unprecedented feat in the fashion world. In 1952, she opened her own business, Bonnie Cashin Designs. Cashin was the first designer chosen for Patterns of The Times, American Designer Series, which was a monthly feature in The New York Times during the 1950s that made designer patterns available for home sewing.

In 1962, Cashin was hired by Miles and Lillian Cahn as the first designer for Coach, a newly-formed women's accessory business. Coach was a division of their wholesale men's accessory company, Gail Leather Products, and internally, it was referred to as "the Bonnie Cashin account," as she was a contracted designer, never a Gail Leather or Coach employee. Her classic designs for Gail's Coach division during the early 1960s included the shopping bag tote, the bucket bag, shoulder bag and a clutch-style purse with a removable shoulder strap. In 1964, Cashin introduced a brass turn lock/toggle fastening that was featured on her designs produced by the Cahns as well as on all garment and accessory collections produced by a range of manufacturers in the US and abroad, including Philip Sills, Meyers, Crescendoe-Superb, HBA, and D. Klein. Cashin designed two small collections for the Cahns each year to complement her garment designs for other manufacturers until 1974. In 1975, Meyers Manufacturing took over the production of her signature handbag designs.

Cashin designed for over thirty-five firms including Hermès and Ballantyne, always with her signature on the label. She also created the first-ever designer flight attendants' uniforms for American Airlines.

In 1972, Cashin founded The Knittery, which produced limited edition collections of coats and handmade Scottish sweaters. That year, she was inducted into the Coty American Fashion Critics Hall of Fame.

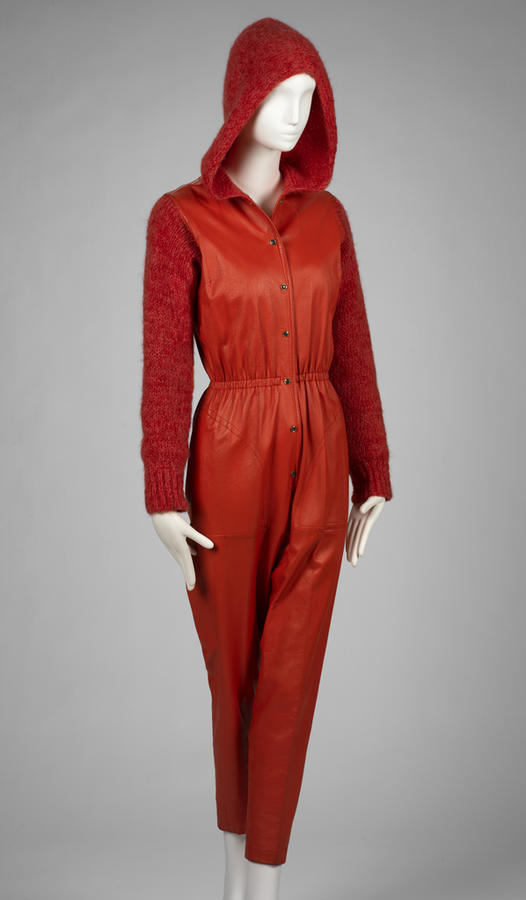
1963 red leather and mohair knit hooded jumpsuit

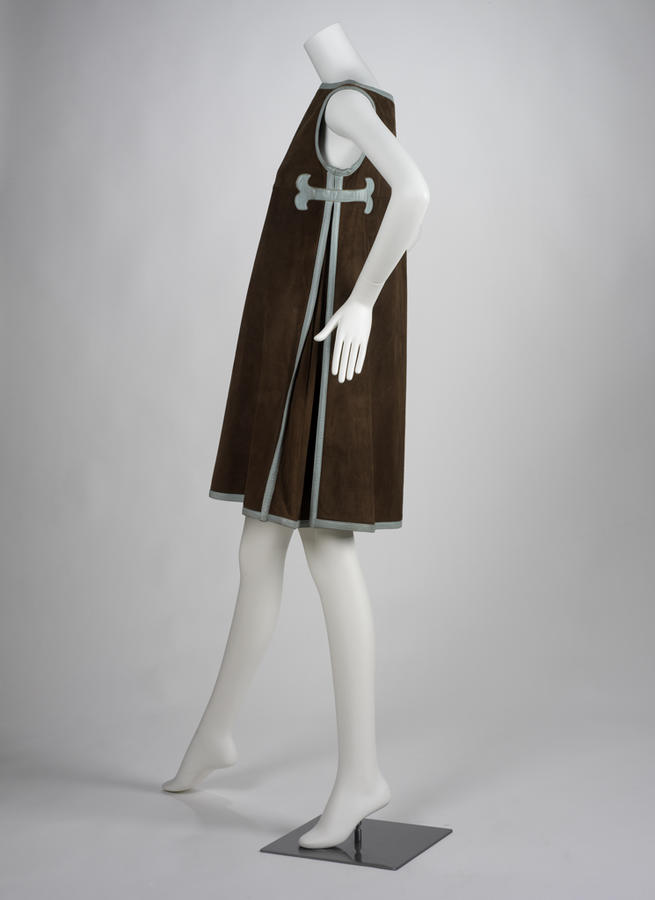
1967 brown suede tunic dress trimmed with blue leather

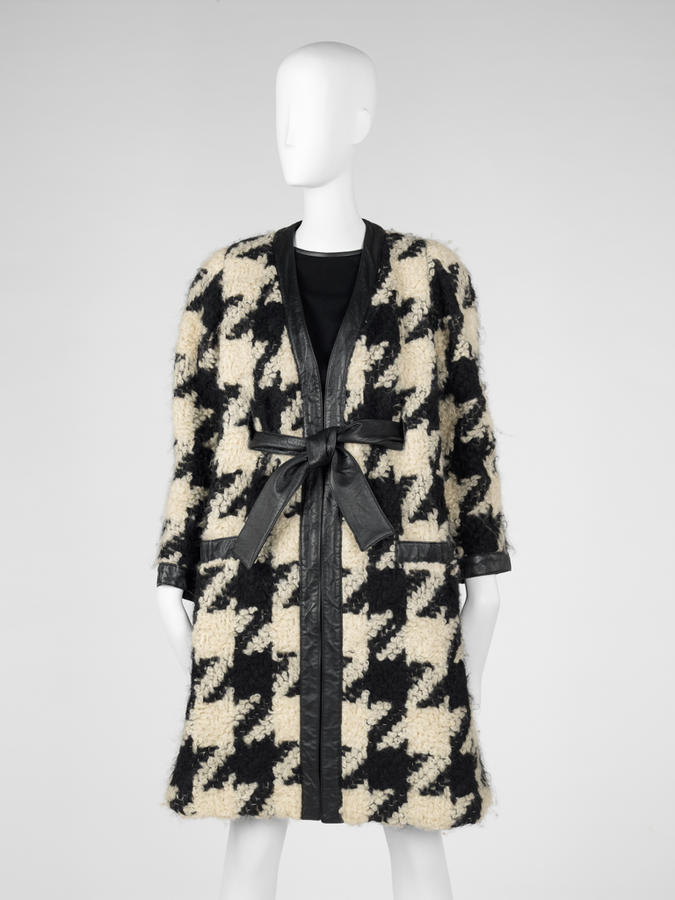
1968 coat, black and white houndstooth wool.

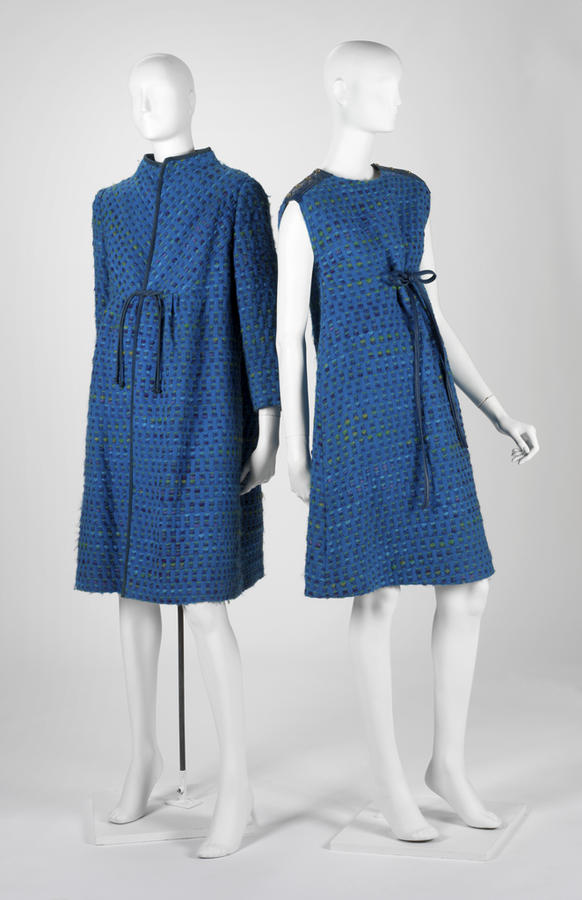
1968 dress and coat ensemble, blue wool tweed

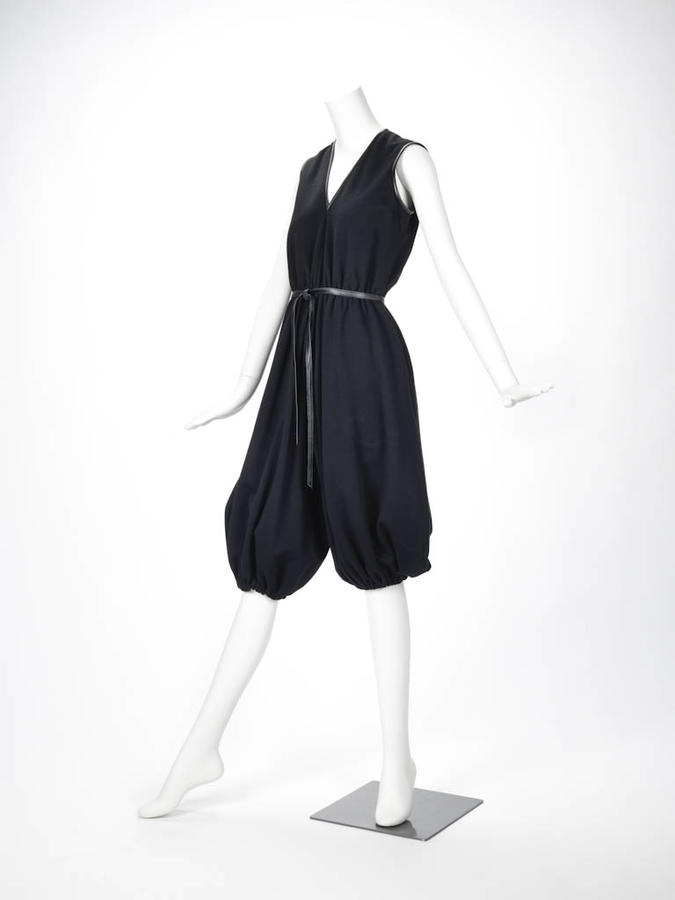
1969 black jersey jumpsuit, bloomer legs.

=== Philanthropy ===
In 1979, Cashin established the Innovative Design Fund, a nonprofit organization based in New York that gave up to $10,000 to designers with original ideas in home furnishings, textiles, and fashion so they could transform their sketches into marketable products.

Toward the end of her life, Cashin granted exclusive and unrestricted access to her personal design archive to design scholar Stephanie Lake, whom Cashin described as her "little sister. In 2016, Rizzoli published Lake's definitive monograph on the designer, Bonnie Cashin: Chic is Where You Find It.

== Personal life ==
In the early 1940s after she had moved back to California, Cashin was married briefly to Disney illustrator and art director Robert Sterner. The marriage ended in divorce, and they had no children.

In the 1970s, Cashin met Amy Vanderbilt's then-husband Curtis Kellar, who was head counsel for Mobil Oil. Following Vanderbilt's death, Cashin and Kellar began a romance that lasted until Cashin's death. They never married.

Cashin was a rare female CEO, and her mother was her company's only other major stakeholder, with a one-percent stake. Up until her mother's death in 1963, the two lived in adjoining apartments in midtown Manhattan, where her mother sewed Cashin's samples for major manufacturers. Upon its construction in 1966, Cashin lived and worked at UN Plaza.

== Death ==
Cashin died in Manhattan on February 3, 2000, due to complications from open-heart surgery.

== Legacy ==
The Bonnie Cashin Archive, the designer's personal design archive, is privately owned in its entirety by her heir and biographer, Dr. Stephanie Lake. In 2019 (as reported by Women's Wear Daily), Lake and her husband Cory opened the archive to collaborative partnerships. The Bonnie Cashin Archive and its projects have no affiliation with any Cashin trademarks registered in the decades since Cashin's death. Cashin herself never registered her name.

=== Influence ===
Cashin is often cited for creating both the concept of layering clothing and for coining the term. The idea of layering came from time she spent in living near San Francisco's Chinatown as a young girl. She also pioneered the use of leather, mohair and hardware in her design. Inspired by the brass turnlocks that secured the top of her 1940s convertible, the hardware became a signature feature of all of her designs, including her Coach handbags.

Cashin was famous for her witty and ingenious approaches to designing for mobility, including a dog leash skirt: a long wool skirt that could be instantly shortened for walking up stairs by latching a small brass ring sewn at the bottom to a small brass clasp sewn into the waistline. In a February 2000 interview with National Public Radio, Cashin explained the origin of the skirt: "My studio, out in the country, in Briarcliff, in the old carriage house, had steps that went up to a second floor. And I was constantly holding my skirts going up. I entertained a lot. And I'd be running up stairs with a martini in my hand. And so I thought I'd better hitch my skirt permanently."

=== Exhibitions ===
Cashin's work is housed in over forty museums across the US. In 1962, the Brooklyn Museum presented the first retrospective of her work.

Exhibitions of Cashin's work include:

- "Director's Choice" Philadelphia Museum College of Art, 1961
- "A Bonnie Cashin Living Sketchbook", Brooklyn Museum of Art, 1962
- (untitled exhibition of Cashin's drawings) Time-Life, London, 1966
- "The Art of Fashion", The Costume Institute at the Metropolitan Museum of Art, 1967-1968
- "Made With Paper", The Museum of Contemporary Crafts, 1967-1968
- "Sporting Life", The Costume Institute at the Metropolitan Museum of Art, 1972
- "Suiting Everyone", Smithsonian Institution, 1974
- "Bonnie Cashin Retrospective", Goldstein Gallery, University of Minnesota, 1976
- "American Designer Show", Goldstein Gallery, University of Minnesota, 1978
- "Women Designers", Fashion Institute of Technology, 1981
- "An American Fashion Institution: Designer Bonnie Cashin", Shippensburg State University, 1982
- "Meet Bonnie Cashin: Clothes for the Twentieth Century", State Historical Society of Wisconsin, 1984-1985
- "American Style: Masterpieces of Fashion, 1880-1968", Rhode Island School of Design, 1986
- "So, You Want to be in Pictures: Ready-to-Wear by Hollywood Designers", Cincinnati Art Museum, 1987
- "Her Works Praise Her: Women as Inventors", Goldstein Gallery, University of Minnesota, 1988
- "Dressing the Part: Costume Sketches for Hollywood Films", Brooklyn Museum of Art, 1989
- "Bonnie Cashin: Form Follows Function", Mount Mary College, 1991
- "Paper Clothes: 1966-1991", Fashion Institute of Technology, 1991
- "In Black and White: Dress from the 1920s to Today", Ohio State University, 1992
- "Reel to Real: The Hollywood Designer After Film", Ohio State University, 1993-1994
- "Stipelman: His illustrations and the Fashions they Reflect", Ohio State University, 1996
- "Best Dressed: 250 Years of Style", Philadelphia Museum of Art, 1997-1998
- "American Ingenuity", The Costume Institute at the Metropolitan Museum of Art, 1998
- "Designing Women: American Style 1940-1960", Wadsworth Atheneum, 1998
- "Japonsim in Fashion: Japan Dresses the West", Brooklyn Museum of Art, 1998-1999
- "Bonnie Cashin: Practical Dreamer", Fashion Institute of Technology, 2000-2001
- "Way Haute West", Phoenix Art Museum, 2000-2001
- "Bonnie Cashin for Coach", Mitsukoshi, Tokyo, 2001
- "Women Designers in the USA, 1900-2000: Diversity and Difference", The Bard Graduate Center for Studies in the Decorative Arts, Design and Culture, 2000-2001
- "Bonnie Cashin: An Elegant Solution", Goldstein Gallery, University of Minnesota, 2003
- "Seventh Avenue: Fashion Walk of Fame", Fashion Institute of Technology, 2003-2004
- "Chic is Where You Find It", UCLA, 2003-2004
- "Bonnie Cashin: A Classic American Sportswear Designer", Shippensburg State University, 2004
- "The Artful Line: Drawings and Prints from FIT's Special Collections", Fashion Institute of Technology, 2004
- "Furnishing Fashion: Material Connections in Twentieth-Century Design", The Bard Graduate Center for Studies in the Decorative Arts, Design, and Culture, 2004
- "Bonnie Cashin Plus Six", Robert Hillestad Textiles Gallery, 2007
- "Inside the Designer's Studio: Bonnie Cashin", Drexel University, 2007
- "American High Style: Fashioning a National Collection", Brooklyn Museum, 2010
- "Functional Fashions", Milwaukee Museum of Art, 2019
- "Passer-by", Lafayette Anticipations, Paris, 2019

=== Awards ===
Awards and recognition for Cashin's work include:

- Vogue Fashions America Does Best, 1938
- Neiman Marcus Fashion Award, 1950
- The Coty Fashion Critics Award, 1950
- The Sporting Look Award, Sports Illustrated, 1958
- Philadelphia Museum College of Art Citation, 1959
- Woolknit Associates Design Award, 1959
- The Coty American Fashion Critics Award, 1960
- Lord & Taylor Salute for Creative Contributions to American Design, 1960
- Woolknit Associated Design Award for Special Achievement, 1961
- The Lighthouse for the Blind Award, 1961
- The Coty American Fashion Critics Special Award, 1961
- Sports Illustrated Award, 1963
- The Detroit Business Association National Award, 1963
- The London Sunday Times International Fashion Award, 1964
- The Lighthouse for the Blind Award, 1967
- Moscow International Fashion Award, 1967
- The Coty Fashion Critics Award, 1968
- Leather Industries American Handbag Designer Award, 1968
- The Kaufmann Fashion Award, 1968
- Saks Fifth Avenue, The Creator Citation, 1969
- The Mount Mary Golden Needle Award, 1970
- The Coty American Fashion Critics Hall of Fame Award, 1972
- I. Magnin's Great American Award, 1974
- The American Fashion Award for Furs, 1975
- Drexel University Citation, 1976
- Leather Industries American Handbag Designer Award, 1976
- Woolknit Associates Design Award, 1980
- Fashion Group Foundation Certificate, 1981
- Rhode Island School of Design President's Fellow Award, 1985
- Fashion Walk of Fame, 2001
