= Coach New York =

American fashion house

Coach IP Holdings LLC

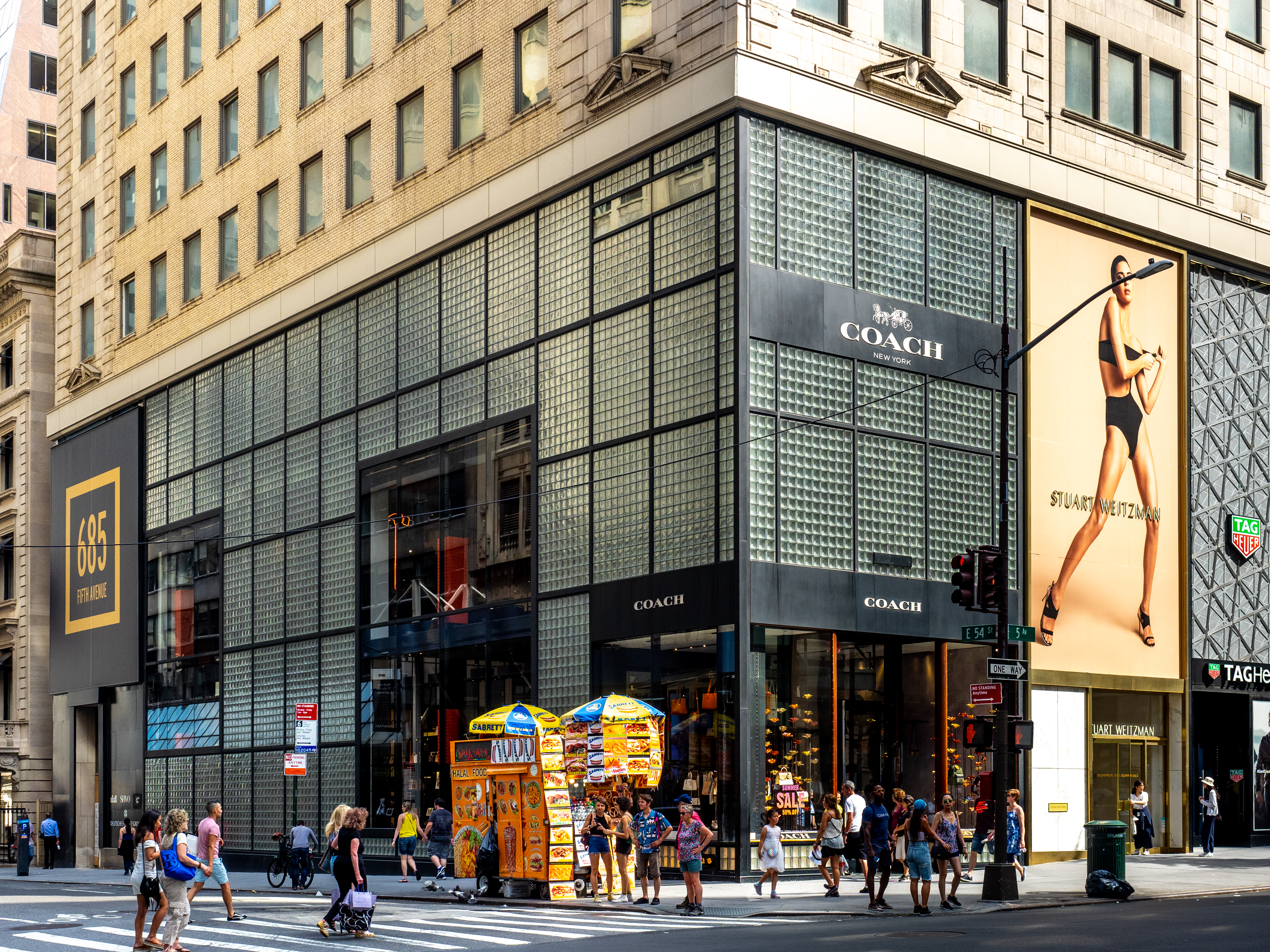
- Coach flagship store on Fifth Avenue, Manhattan
- Type: Subsidiary
- Industry: Fashion
- Founded: 1941; 85 years ago, in New York City, U.S.
- Founders: Lillian Cahn; Miles Cahn
- Headquarters: 516 W 34th St, New York, NY 10001 U.S. 40.75481°N 74.00012°W
- Number of locations: 986 stores
- Area served: Worldwide
- Key people: Todd Kahn (CEO); Stuart Vevers (creative director)
- Products: Handbags; fashion accessories; ready-to-wear; eyewear; fragrances
- Parent: Tapestry, Inc.
- Website: www.coach.com

Coach modern-style logo with signature cartouche

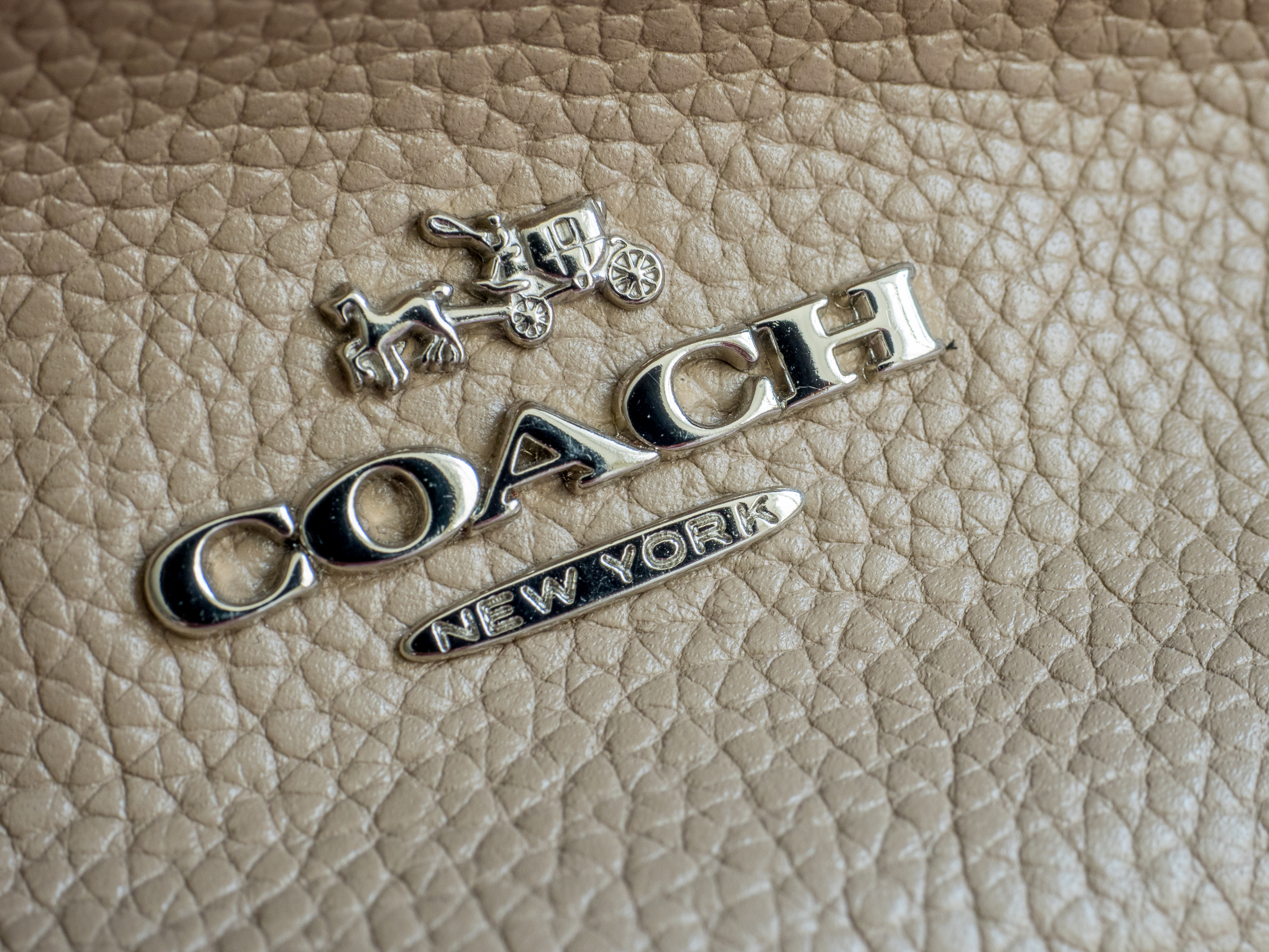
Coach's logo found on their products

Coach New York, commonly known as Coach, is an American fashion house headquartered in New York City specializing in handbags, luggage, and accessories, as well as ready-to-wear. Coach licenses its name and branding to Luxottica for eyewear, and Paris-based Interparfums for fragrances. Stuart Vevers has been the executive creative director since June 2013.

It is the main subsidiary of Tapestry, Inc., formerly known as Coach, Inc.

== History ==
=== 1941–1985 ===
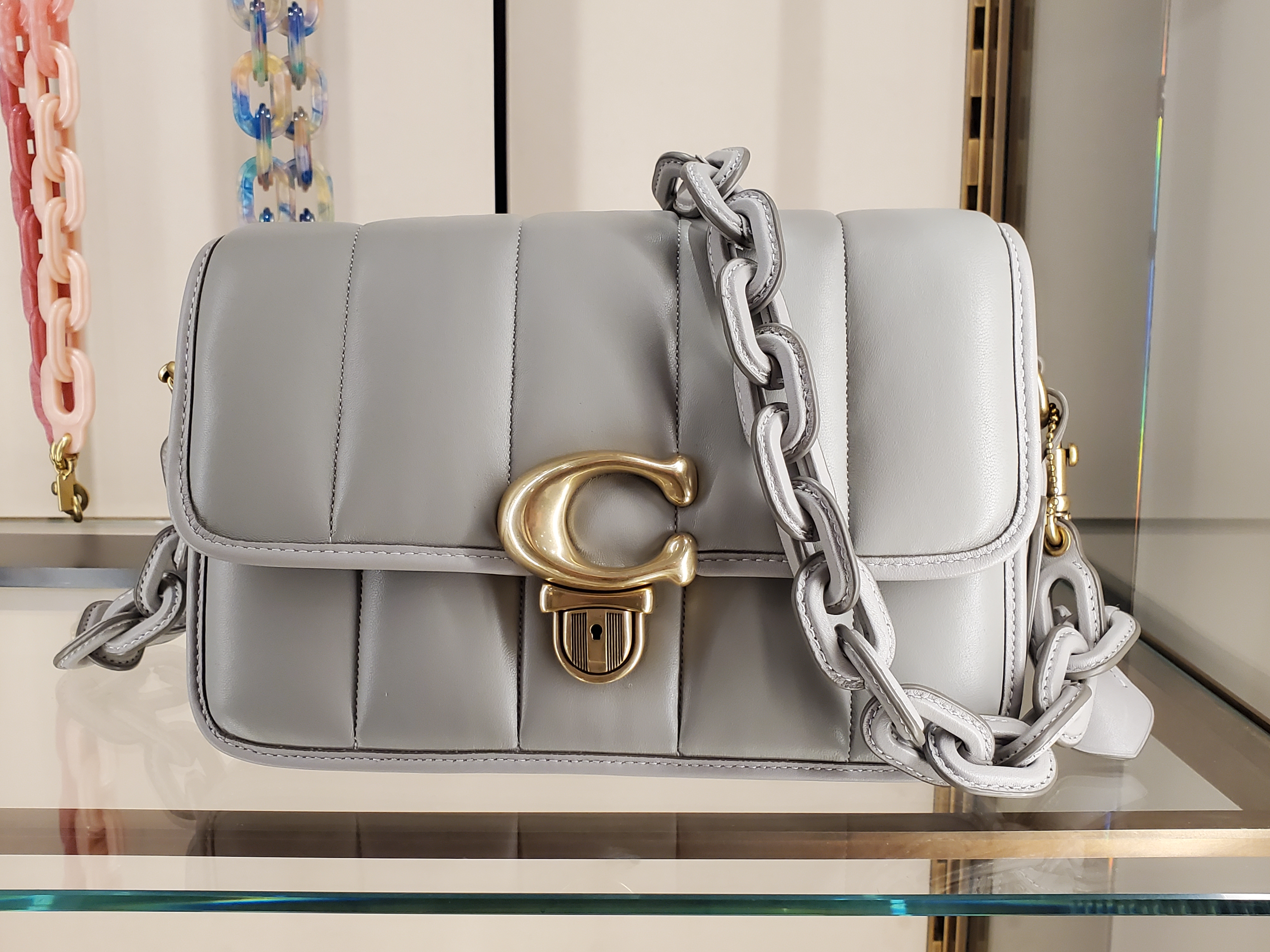
A Coach purse

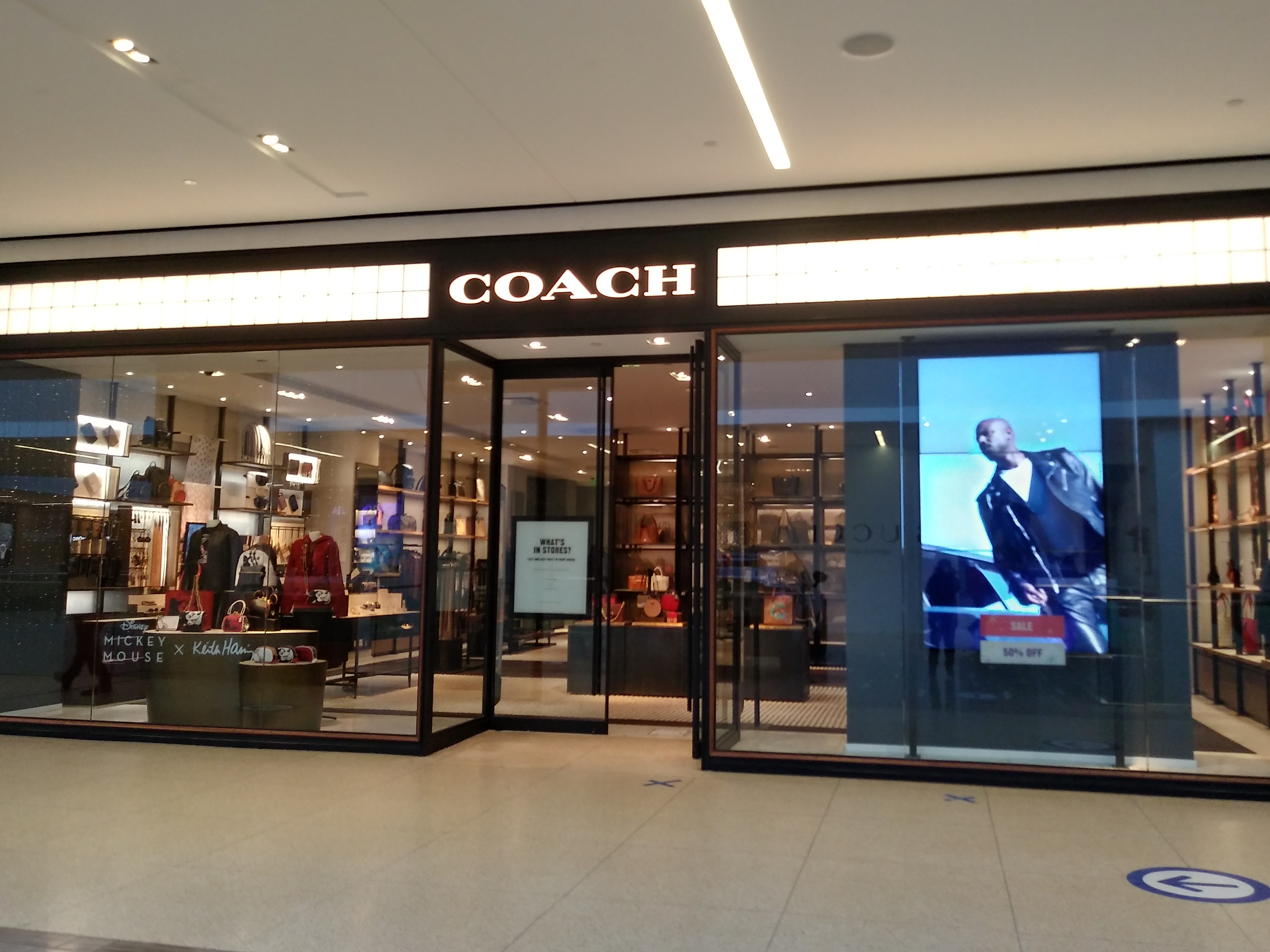
Edmonton Mall Coach store in Alberta, Canada

Coach was founded in 1941, as a family-run workshop in a loft on 34th Street in Manhattan, with six leather-workers who made wallets and billfolds by hand. In 1946, Miles Cahn (1921–2017) and his wife Lillian Cahn (1923–2013) joined the company.

By 1950, Cahn had taken over the company. During the early years, Cahn noticed the distinctive properties and qualities of the leather used to make baseball gloves. With wear and use, the leather in a glove became softer and suppler. Attempting to mimic this process, Cahn developed a process to make the leather stronger, softer, and more flexible. Since the leather absorbed dye very well, this process also created a richer, deeper color.

Soon after Cahn developed this new process, Lillian Cahn suggested to Miles that the company supplement the factory's men's accessories business by adding women's leather handbags. The "sturdy cowhide bags were an immediate hit." Miles and Lillian Cahn bought the company through a leveraged buyout in 1961.

In 1961, Cahn hired Bonnie Cashin, a sportswear pioneer, to design handbags for Coach. Cashin "revolutionized the product's design," working as a creative head for Coach from 1962 through 1974. Cashin instituted the inclusion of side pockets, coin purses, and brighter colors (as opposed to the usual hues of browns and tans) in the products. Cashin designed matching shoes, pens, key fobs, and eyewear, and added hardware to both her clothes and accessories–particularly the silver toggle that became the Coach hallmark–declaring that she had been inspired by a memory of quickly fastening the top on her convertible sports car.

In 1979, Lewis Frankfort joined the company as vice-president of business development. During this time, Coach was making $6 million in sales, and products were being distributed through the domestic wholesale channel, primarily in the northeastern United States. Mr. Rose, then executive VP of sales, mentored Frankfort, before retiring from his position in the company in 1995.

In 1981 the company opened its first directly operated retail location on Madison Avenue in Midtown Manhattan.

=== 1985: Sale to Sara Lee ===
In 1985, the Cahns sold Coach Leatherware to Sara Lee Corporation for a reported $30 million, having decided to "devote more time to their growing goat farm and cheese production business called Coach Farm in Gallatinville, New York, which they began in 1983". Lew Frankfort succeeded Cahn as president.

Sara Lee structured Coach under its Hanes Group branch of subsidiaries of brands. In early 1986, the company opened new boutiques in Macy's stores in New York City and San Francisco. Additional Coach stores were under construction, and similar boutiques were to be opened in other major department stores later that year. By November 1986, the company was operating 12 stores, along with nearly 50 boutiques within larger department stores.

Sara Lee Corporation divested itself of Coach first, by selling 19.5% of their shares of Coach at the Coach IPO in October 2000, followed in April 2001, with the distribution of their remaining shares to Sara Lee's stockholders through an exchange offer.

=== 1996: Reed Krakoff leads design ===
In 1996, Lew Frankfort was named chairman and CEO of Coach. The following year, under Frankfort's leadership, Coach hired Reed Krakoff, whose creative and commercials instincts aimed to make Coach products functional, lightweight, and stylish. Krakoff's design transformed Coach from the relatively small company that it was in 1985 into the worldwide-known brand that it is today.

On June 1, 2000, the company changed its name to Coach, Inc.

=== 2013–present ===
In February 2013, Coach named Victor Luis president and chief commercial officer and announced that he would become a chief executive officer in January 2014, with Lew Frankfort continuing as executive chairman. In 2013, Coach generated $5 billion in sales and operated approximately 1,000 directly operated locations globally, including North America, Japan, China, Singapore, Taiwan, Malaysia, Korea, and Europe.

In 2014, the company announced Stuart Vevers as the new executive creative director, replacing Reed Krakoff. During 2014, Coach also announced that Lew Frankfort would retire as executive chairman at the expiration of his term in November 2014.

In January 2015, Coach agreed to buy shoemaker Stuart Weitzman for up to $574 million in cash. In the same year, Coach also launched Coach 1941, "a new, higher-priced line centered on ready-to-wear." Coach marked its 75th anniversary in 2016 with the announcement of its partnership with Selena Gomez.

In July 2017, Coach purchased Kate Spade for $2.4 billion. Michael Kors Holdings Ltd. had previously expressed interest in buying Kate Spade. On October 10, 2017, Victor Luis (CEO) announced that on October 31, Coach Inc would be renamed and rebranded as Tapestry Inc. The company's ticker symbol on the NYSE changed from COH to TPR effective October 31, 2017. As of 2019, Coach dropped the use of fur from its collection.

In September 2019, Coach named Jide J. Zeitlin, Chairman of the Board, as new CEO of Tapestry, Inc., replacing former Chief Executive Officer Victor Luis. Zeitlin resigned his position in July 2020, following allegations of personal misconduct.

In 2019 it was announced that a float depicting Coach's house mascot Rexy the Dinosaur would be featured in the Macy's Thanksgiving Day Parade.

In November 2019, Jennifer Lopez became the new global face of the company. As of 2019, Coach has 986 stores worldwide.

In 2020, Coach again rebranded. Like many brands during the COVID-19 pandemic, Coach began focusing on its digital platform.

In 2021, Coach celebrated its 80th anniversary. Also in 2021, Coach launched their "(Re)Loved" initiative as a way to contribute to sustainability and reduced wasted in landfills. They upcraft and repurpose used bags and give them new life in order to appeal to a new owner and ensure one less bag ends up in a landfill.

In 2023, Coach launched Coachtopia in a larger effort to adopt a circular business model. Goods made under the Coachtopia brand utilize materials that are recycled, repurposed, and renewable.

In 2026, Tapestry announced that sales for the third quarter of fiscal year 2026 exceeded forecasts by at least 20% (approximately $1.7 billion), primarily due to the Coach brand.

== Corporate affairs ==
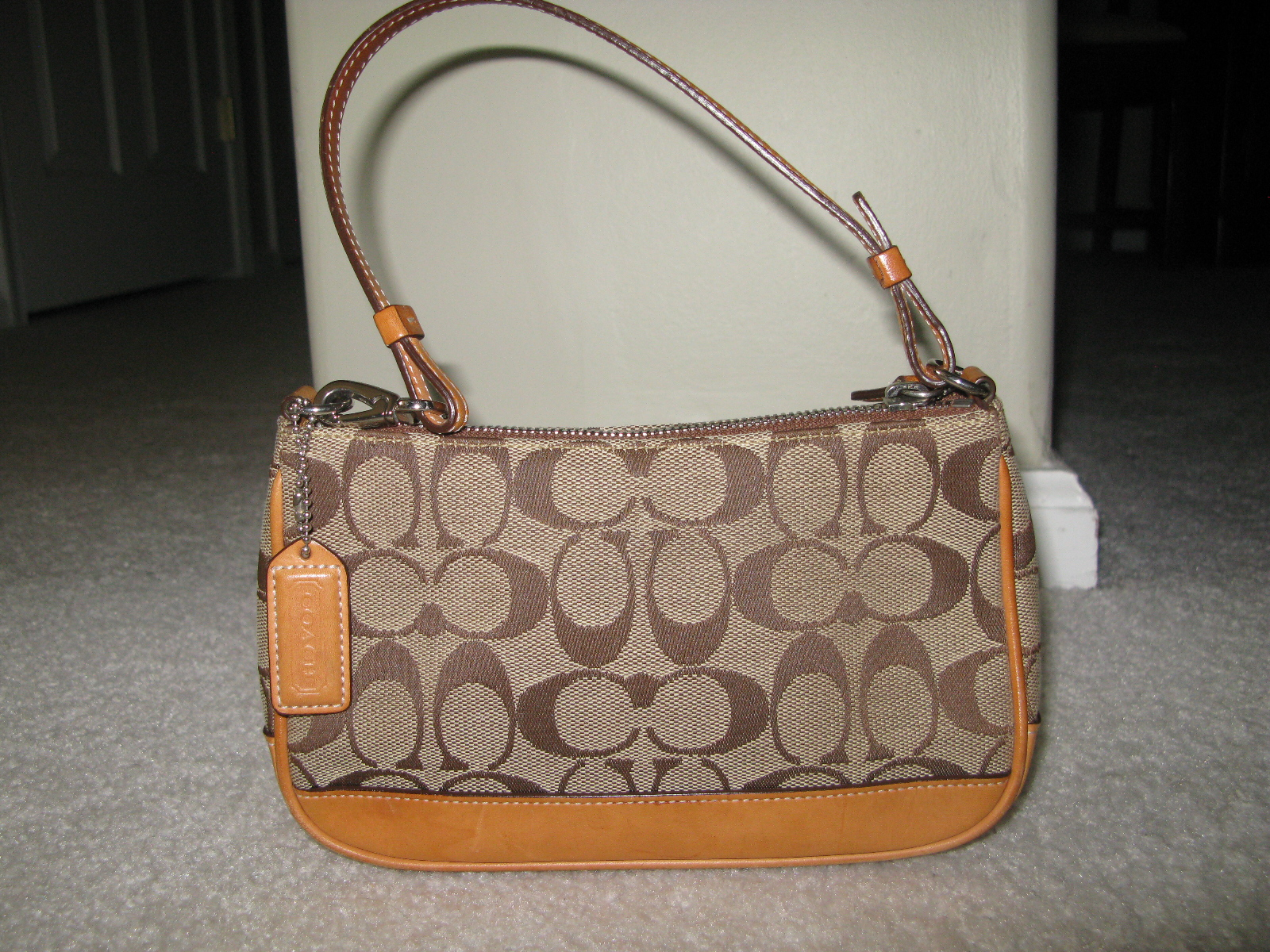
Coach purse with the signature monogram C

=== Leadership ===
Lewis Frankfort has been involved with Coach for more than 30 years. He was named chairman and CEO in 1995, and in 2014 became executive chairman. During 2000, he oversaw Coach's transition to a publicly traded company listed on the NYSE and in 2011, became the first American issuer to list on the Stock Exchange of Hong Kong.

Victor Luis was named chief executive officer of Coach, Inc. in January 2014. Before his appointment and beginning in February 2013, he held the role of president and chief commercial officer of Coach, Inc., also serving on Coach's board of directors.

Stuart Vevers joined Coach in the fall of 2013 as executive creative director. Vevers joined Coach from Loewe, where he held the role of creative director since 2008. Before Loewe, he served as creative director of Mulberry from 2005 to 2008. He began his career at Calvin Klein. In 2006, Vevers won the British Fashion Council's Accessory Designer of the Year award.

Jide J. Zeitlin, Chairman of the Board, was appointed Chief Executive Officer (CEO) of Tapestry in September 2019. Prior to his resignation in 2020, Zeitlin was responsible for the execution of the company's strategic agenda and financial performance.

In July 2020, Todd Kahn was appointed CEO and Brand President.

== Operations ==
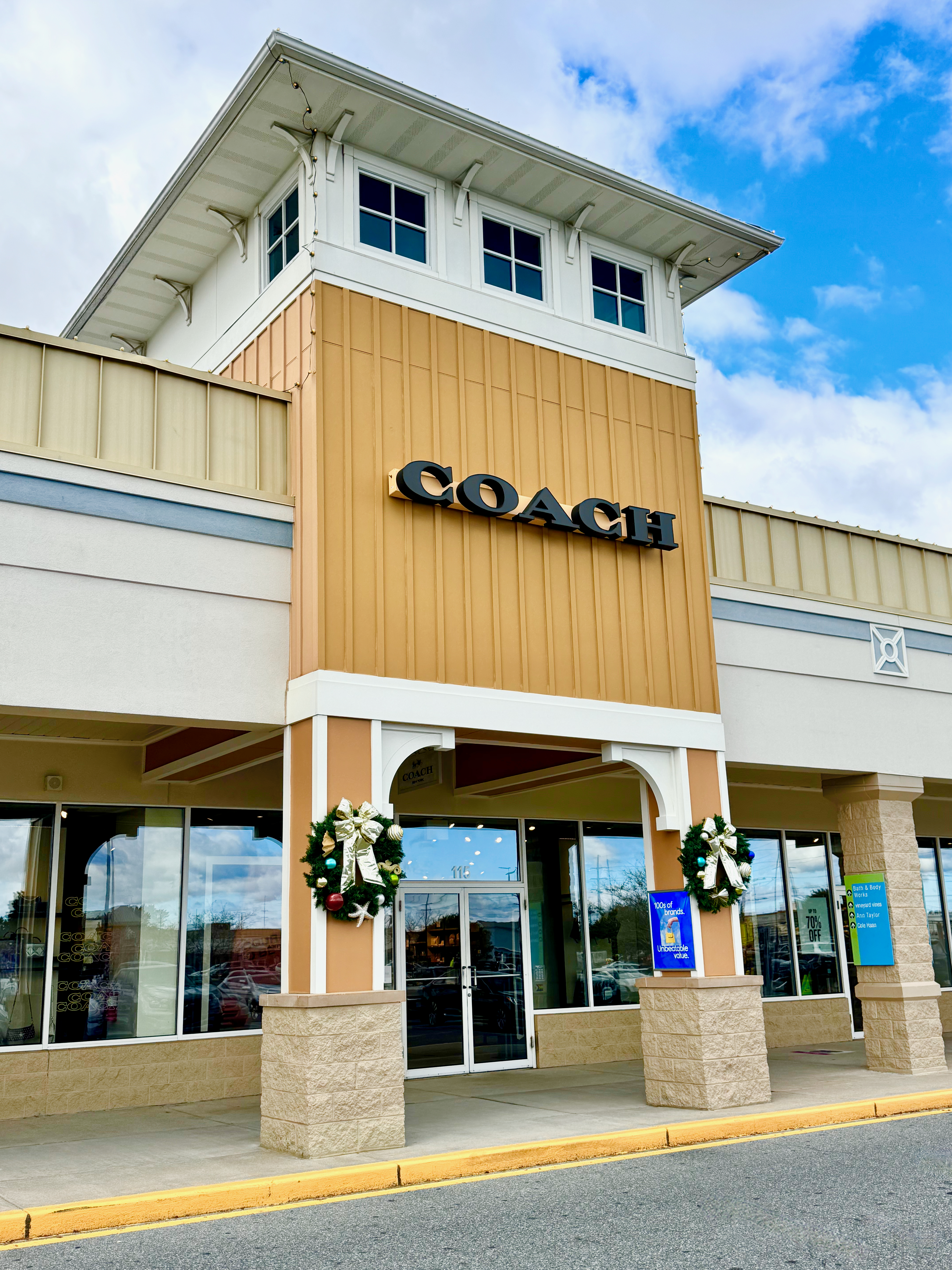
A Coach store in an outlet mall

As of 2013, there were approximately 1,000 Coach stores in North America. Coach has also built a strong presence in the U.S. through Coach boutiques located within select department stores and specialty retailer locations. As of 2026, Coach has approximately 311 locations in the United States.

Coinciding with its 75th anniversary in 2016, Coach opened Coach House, a 20,000-square-foot Midtown Manhattan retail space.

Today, Coach's corporate headquarters remain in Midtown Manhattan on 34th Street, in the location of their former factory lofts. In August 2016, the company finalized the sale and leaseback of its office condo portion of 10 Hudson Yards – its headquarters. Coach received $707 million before transaction costs.

In 1999, Coach launched its online store at www.coach.com.

On 4 March 2024, the first Coach restaurant opened in Grand Indonesia Shopping Town in Jakarta, Indonesia.

In December of 2024 the first Coach Coffee Shop opened in the Jersey Shore Premium Outlets in Tinton Falls, New Jersey.

== The Coach Foundation ==
The Coach Foundation was established in 2008 to support organizations that "empower" and educate women and children around the world.
