= Sailor (restaurant) =

Restaurant in Brooklyn, New York, U.S.

- Interactive map of Sailor

Restaurant information
- Established: September 2023
- Location: 228 DeKalb Avenue, Brooklyn, New York, 11205, United States
- Coordinates: 40°41′22″N 73°58′13″W

Sailor is a restaurant in Brooklyn, New York. The menu includes seafood. April Bloomfield is the restaurant's chef.

== Reception ==
The New York Times included Sailor in a 2023 list of the city's twelve best new restaurants. Time Out New York rated the restaurant four out of five stars.

Pete Wells placed Sailor twenty-fifth in his 2024 ranking of New York City's best restaurants.
