= The Spotted Pig =

Defunct restaurant in New York City

Coordinates: 40°44′8.23″N 74°0′24.2″W

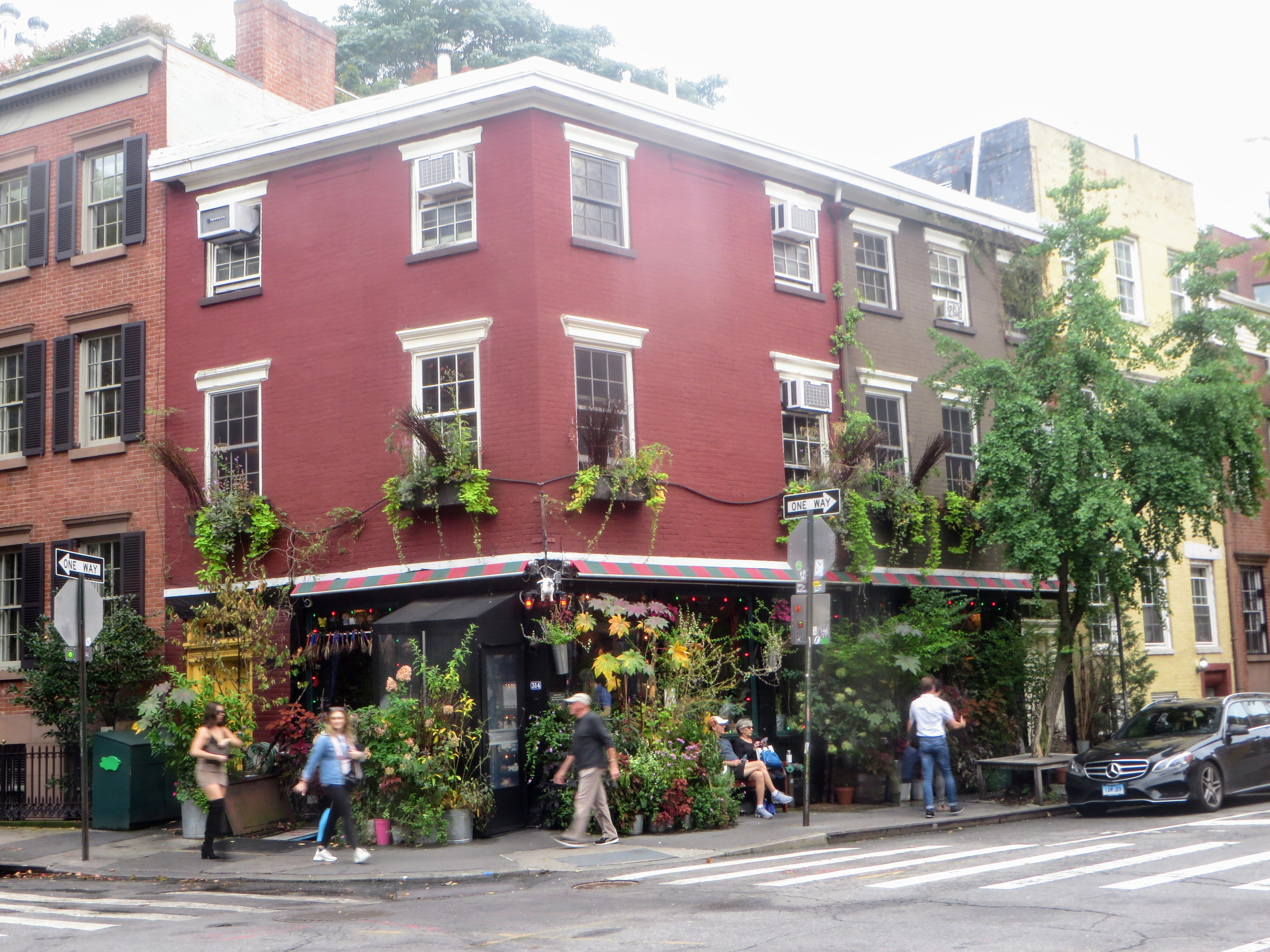
- The Spotted Pig in 2017
- Interactive map of The Spotted Pig

Restaurant information
- Established: 2004; 22 years ago
- Closed: 2020; 6 years ago
- Owner: Ken Friedman
- Chef: April Bloomfield
- Food type: European (modern), gastropub, hamburgers
- Location: New York City, New York, 10014, United States
- Seating capacity: 100

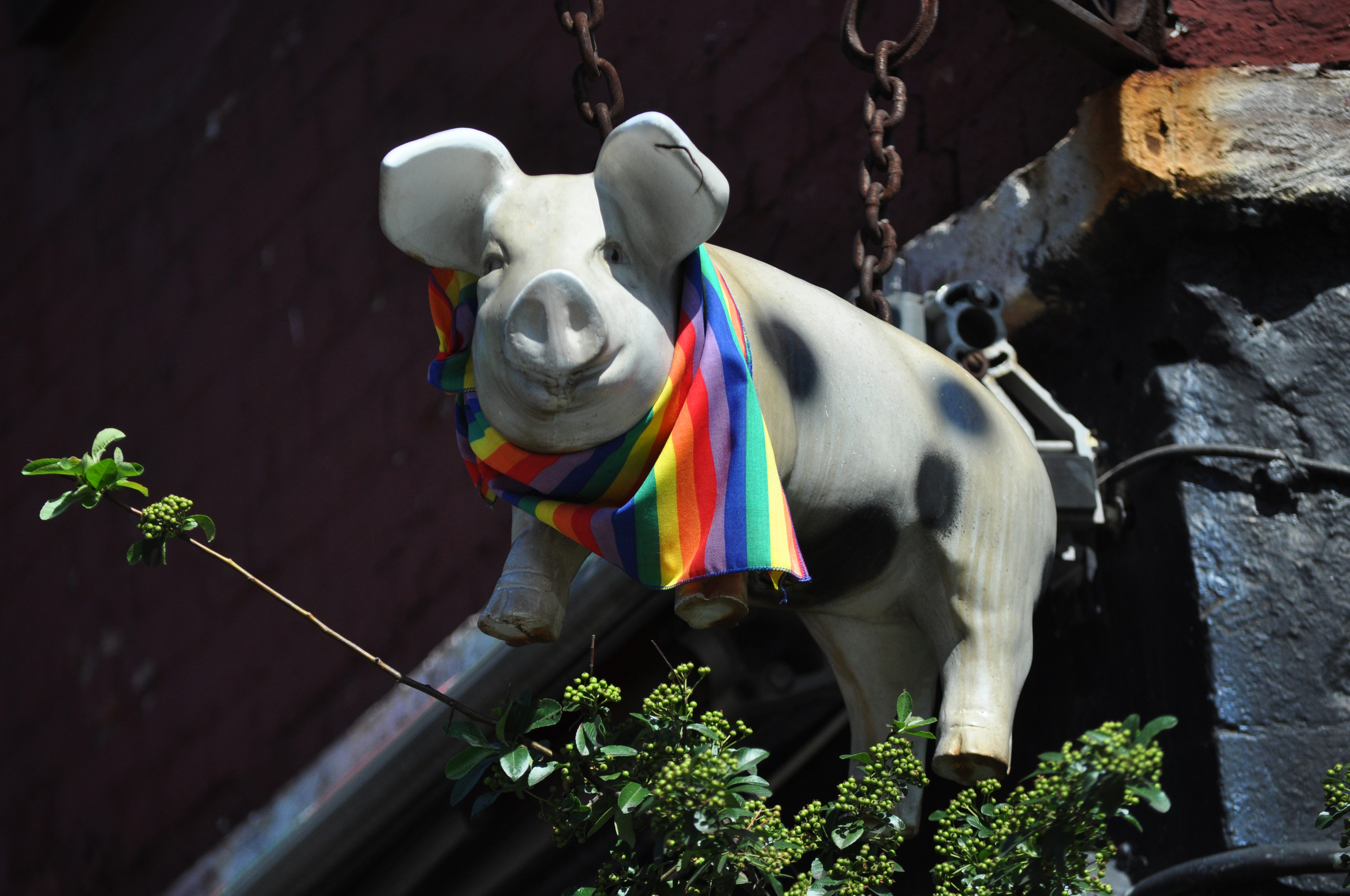
Restaurant sign

The Spotted Pig was a gastropub at 314 West 11th Street (at Greenwich Street) in the West Village in Manhattan, New York City. It was owned by Ken Friedman. Mario Batali was a primary investor. The chef was April Bloomfield, a British expatriate celebrity chef who was hired after flying to New York and interviewing with Batali and Friedman. The restaurant held a Michelin star from about 2006 to 2016. The restaurant closed on January 26, 2020.

== Harassment and assault accusations ==
In December 2017, owner Ken Friedman was accused of multiple cases of sexual harassment in an article published in The New York Times. The report was based on interviews of more than two dozen then-current and former employees, who said chef April Bloomfield was aware of his behavior, but did nothing to shield employees from it, and that her response to employees was: "That's who he is. Get used to it. Or go work for someone else". Bloomfield was also aware of her restaurant's third floor nickname, "the rape room". As investors, Mario Batali and Jay-Z were frequent visitors; Batali was also accused of criminal behavior on the third floor. Friedman resigned from the management of their restaurant group. In December 2017, Bloomfield posted an apology on Twitter for not protecting her staff. On January 7, 2020, Ken Friedman agreed to pay $240,000 and 20% of his profits to former employees who accused him of sexual harassment and discrimination.

== In popular culture ==
The 2025 Netflix miniseries Black Rabbit is partially based on the controversies surrounding the Spotted Pig.

== See also ==
- List of restaurants in New York City
