= Loewe (fashion brand) =

Spanish luxury fashion house

Loewe S.A.

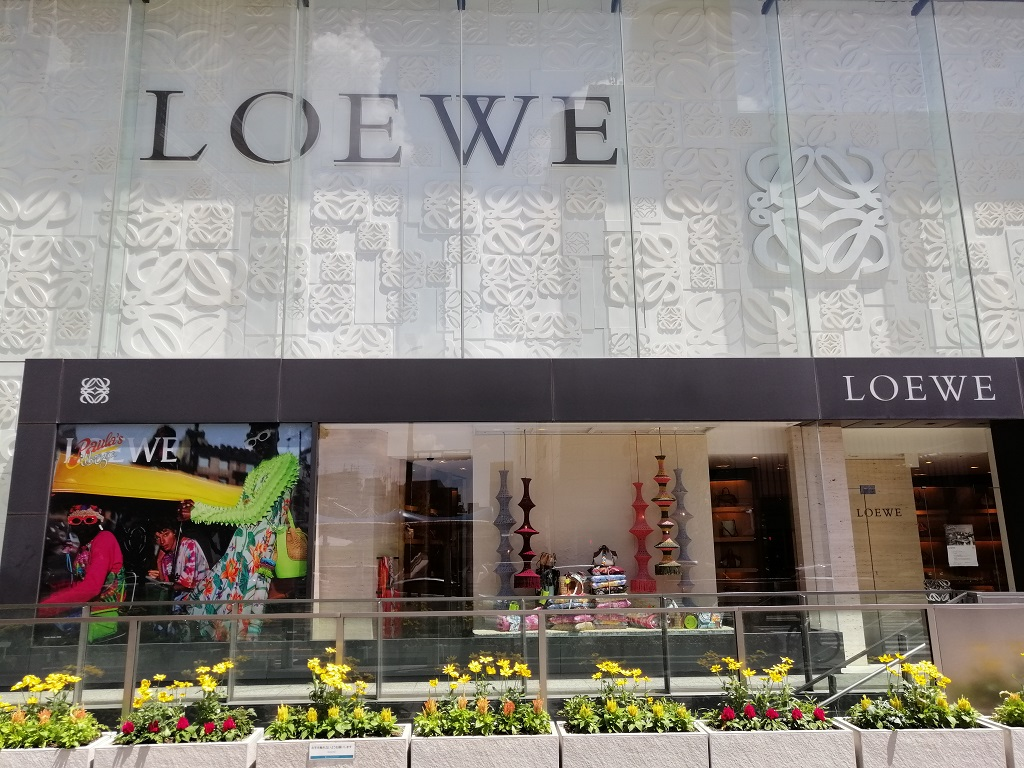
- Loewe store in Nagoya, Japan
- Type: Subsidiary
- Industry: Fashion
- Founded: 1846; 180 years ago
- Founder: Enrique Loewe y Roessberg
- Headquarters: Calle de Goya 4; 28001 Madrid, Spain
- Key people: Jack McCollough (Creative Director); Lazaro Hernandez (Creative Director); Pascale Lepoivre (CEO)
- Products: Ready-to-wear, haute couture, cosmetics, shoes, fashion accessories, jewelry, perfumes, watches
- Revenue: ▲€626 million (2022)
- Net income: ▲€128 million (2022)
- Number of employees: 1,300
- Parent: LVMH
- Website: loewe.com

Loewe S.A. (/loʊˈɛveɪ/ loh-EV-ay, Spanish: [loˈeβe], German: [ˈløːvə]; stylized as LOEWE) is a Spanish luxury fashion house specialising in leather goods, clothing, shoes, and other fashion accessories. Founded in 1846 in Madrid, it is the second oldest luxury fashion house worldwide. Loewe's ateliers and headquarters are in Madrid, Spain, with teams and operations in Paris, France. Loewe has been a part of LVMH since 1996. Pascale Lepoivre has been CEO of Loewe since 2016, and Jack McCollough and Lazaro Hernandez creative directors since 2025.

== History ==
=== Spanish roots ===
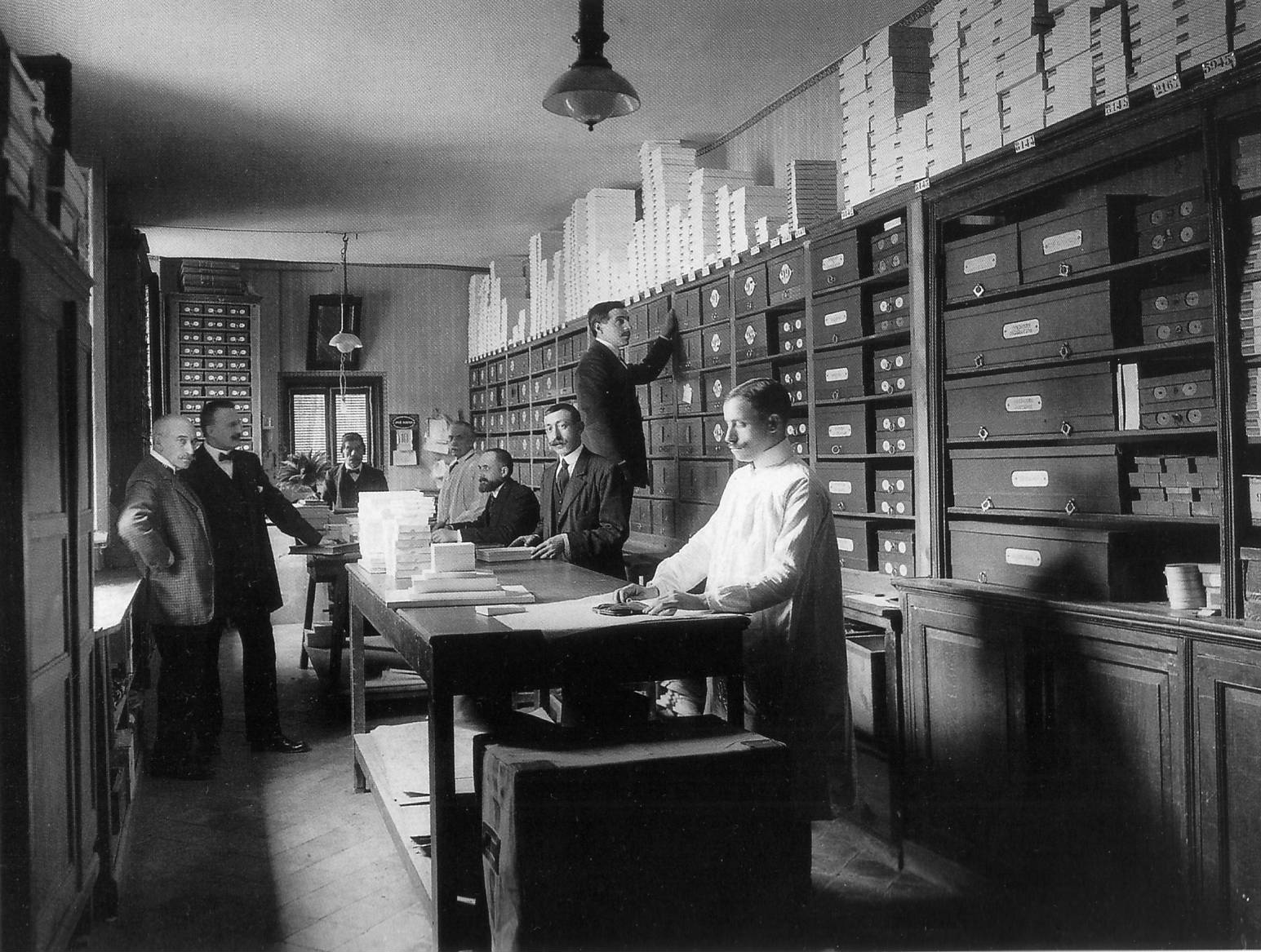
Loewe boutique in Madrid, 1905

Loewe was founded in 1846 in Madrid by a group of Spanish artisans specialized in leather goods. In 1872, Enrique Loewe y Roessberg, a German merchant of Hessian origin, consolidated the group under his name. In 1892, Loewe opened its first store on Madrid exclusive Calle Príncipe. In 1905, Alfonso XIII granted Enrique Loewe y Hinton, the son of Enrique Loewe y Roessberg, the title of Purveyor to the Royal Court.

In the 1910s, Loewe opened two stores in Barcelona on Calle Fontanella and Calle Fernando. The company quickly grew in popularity and was promoted by figures such as Princess Grace of Monaco, Ernest Hemingway, Ava Gardner, Rita Hayworth, Marlene Dietrich and Sophia Loren. In 1935, Enrique Loewe Knappe, third generation of the Loewe family, became the new head of the company. Designer José Pérez Rozas was hired to design handbags.

During the 1960s, for the first time, Loewe introduced a large palette of colors for its leathers. A women's ready-to-wear collection was launched in 1963, and its first store outside of Spain, on Old Bond Street in London, opened in 1963. The fourth generation of the Loewe family took over the direction of the company in 1965. By the 1970s, Loewe was expanding into perfumes and fashion with the creation of the Loewe anagram logo, designed by Spanish painter Vicente Vela.

=== International development ===
Loewe opened a boutique in Hong Kong in 1976, and its first store in the US, in New York, in 1983. In 1984, Louis Urvois and Gian Luca Spinola acquired the majority of shares in Loewe. Gustavo Torner was appointed to redesign the brand's boutiques. Through the 1980s, Giorgio Armani and Laura Biagiotti designed womenswear collections. A collection for men was launched in 1983. In 1986, luxury group LVMH bought the rights to Loewe's international distribution.

In February 1996, LVMH became sole owner of Loewe. In 1997, Narciso Rodriguez joined the company as new creative director. The brand had its first Paris runway presentation at LVMH headquarters in the fall/winter 1998 season. José Enrique Oña Selfa took over the creative direction of Loewe in 2000, introducing new sensual looks. He was followed by Stuart Vevers in 2008 who maintained his predecessor's style and further developed the handbags and accessories lines before stepping down in 2013.

In 2013, Jonathan Anderson was appointed creative director. The following year, Loewe's headquarters (including the design team) moved from Madrid to Paris, though the company remained headquartered in Madrid. Anderson's first ready-to-wear collections were presented in 2014. His leather bags were described by Vogue as "luxurious, functional and distinctive". In 2015, Anderson introduced the Puzzle bag. In 2016, Loewe created the Loewe Foundation Craft Prize, and Pascale Lepoivre was appointed CEO. Loewe designed custom performance looks for American singer Beyoncé's Renaissance World Tour. In 2024, Loewe launched its first public exhibition, Crafted World, at the Shanghai Exhibition Centre, and sponsored the Metropolitan Museum of Art’s spring 2024 Costume Institute exhibition Sleeping Beauties: Reawakening Fashion. Anderson stepped down from his role at Loewe in March 2025.

In 2025, Jack McCollough and Lazaro Hernandez were appointed creative directors of Loewe. The duo's creative approach was focused on crafted looks blending Spanish and American styles, “infusing their signature New York attitude into the house codes”. Their first womenswear collection introduced items such as leather minidresses and color-striped maxi-dresses. Their first menswear collection was described by GQ as "a bizarro vision that is funky and tactile", introducing new items such as an inflating leather parka, and cotton jeans slathered in traffic cones. In 2026, Loewe announced a four-year partnership to provide travelwear and accessories to the Spain national football team.

== Locations ==
Loewe stores are located worldwide. In 2014, Loewe's then-143 stores were concentrated mainly in Spain and Japan, which respectively had 37 and 27 locations. Today, the company has at least seven stores in the US: Miami's Design District (since 2016), the Wynn in Las Vegas (since 2018), New York (since 2019), Rodeo Drive in Los Angeles (since 2022), Bal Harbor in Florida, Boston, and River Oaks District in Houston.

In 2016, Loewe opened Casa Loewe Madrid, the brand's first flagship in Madrid and – with 10,750 square feet (999 square metres) – its largest store in the world. It is located in the ground floor of the company's head office in a landmark 19th-century building. In 2019, Loewe outgrew its London store in Mount Street and opened Casa Loewe at 41-42 New Bond Street.

With 41 stores in Mainland China, high profile expansions include Loewe Perfumes in Deji Plaza, Nanjing in 2022 and Loewe Gaozhai, a Casa Loewe concept, in Taikoo Li, Chengdu in 2024.

== Campaigns ==
Loewe's global brand ambassadors have included Penélope Cruz (2013–2015), Josh O'Connor (since 2017), Leo Wu (since 2022), Tang Wei (since 2022), South Korean girl group Nmixx (since 2022), Taylor Russell (since 2022), Taeyong (since 2023), Yang Mi (since 2023), Jamie Dornan (since 2024), Giselle (since 2024), Lim Ji-Yeon (since 2024) and Wang Yibo (since 2024). Other celebrities who have featured in the brand's advertisement campaigns include Gisele Bündchen (2017), Tracee Ellis Ross (2021), Gillian Anderson (2021), Greta Lee (2023), Maggie Smith (2023), Kit Connor (2024), and Daniel Craig (2024).

During Stuart Vevers's tenure, most Loewe advertising campaigns were shot by Mert Alaş and Marcus Piggott. For his first Loewe ad campaigns, Jonathan Anderson worked with Steven Meisel; he subsequently worked with Tyler Mitchell (2020) and Juergen Teller (since 2021).

Jack McCollough and Lazaro Hernandez have worked with New York-based artist and photographer Talia Chetrit.

== Governance ==
=== Presidents/CEOs ===
- 2009-2016: Lisa Montague
- Since 2016: Pascale Lepoivre

=== Creative directors ===
- 1938–1970s: José Pérez de Rozas
- 1997–2000: Narciso Rodriguez
- 2000–2007: José Enrique Oña Selfa
- 2008–2013: Stuart Vevers
- 2013–2025: Jonathan Anderson
- Since 2025: Jack McCollough and Lazaro Hernandez (2025–present)

== Foundation ==
The Loewe Foundation was created in 1988 to promote creativity, support education, and safeguard heritage craft, art, photography, poetry and dance. It launched the Loewe Foundation International Poetry Prize the same year.

In 2017, the foundation inaugurated the first edition of the Loewe Foundation Craft Prize, a competition established to support exceptional handmade craft. In 2021, the Loewe Foundation/Studio Voltaire Award was launched in collaboration with UK-based Studio Voltaire to award art focused on diversity, creative thinking and individuality. In 2023, the Loewe Foundation launched the "Writing the Prado" program with the Museo del Prado, a program inviting writers to find inspiration in the museum's collections.
