= Salumi (Seattle) =

Restaurant in Seattle, Washington, U.S.

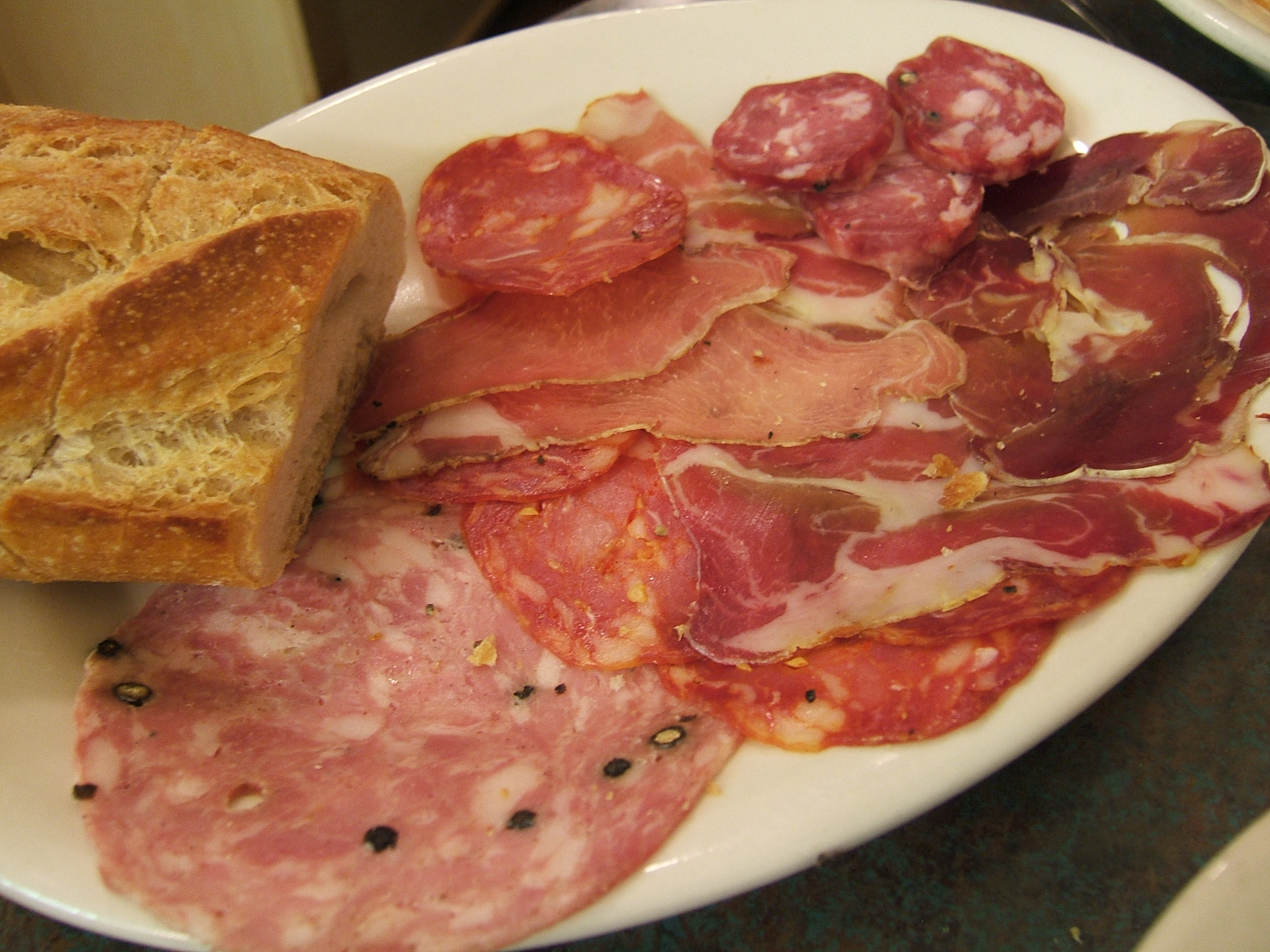
- Interactive map of Salumi

Restaurant information
- Owner: Gina Batali
- Food type: Italian
- Location: 309 Third Ave South, Seattle, Washington, 98104, US
- Coordinates: 47.599743°N 122.330522°W
- Website: salumideli.com

Salumi is a salumeria and restaurant in the Pioneer Square neighborhood of downtown Seattle, Washington.

== History ==
Salumi was founded by Armandino Batali, the father of New York chef Mario Batali, and as of 2006 was run as a family business with his wife, daughter Gina Batali, and son-in-law Brian D'Amato owning and operating.

In the episode "Pacific Northwest" of the show Anthony Bourdain: No Reservations on the Travel Channel, chef and host Anthony Bourdain visited and dined in Salumi. In the segment, Bourdain participated in the process of curing meat and showed Armandino's sister making gnocchi in the front window. The show also mentioned and displayed the frequent long line in this restaurant. Bourdain would later describe the restaurant as a "temple to cured meats".

Salumi was also featured on Travel Channel's Adam Richman's Best Sandwich in America. Adam Richman met with Gina Batali, Mario's sister, and sampled the Oxtail sandwich, which is only featured at the restaurant a few times a year.

In 2017, Salumi was sold to Grant Peak Capital, a search fund owned by Clara Veniard and Martinique Grigg. Gina Batali and Brian D'Amato retain a minority equity stake in the business.

In 2018, Salumi announced plans to build a new production facility to support regional and national distribution.

Armandino Batali died on November 28, 2025, at the age of 88.
