= Stuart Vevers =

British fashion designer (born 1973)

- Born: 17 November 1973 (age 52); Doncaster, South Yorkshire, England
- Education: University of Westminster
- Label: Coach New York
- Spouse: Benjamin Seidler
- Children: 3
- Awards: Accessory Designer of the Year 2006, Accessory Designer of the Year 2017

Stuart Vevers OBE (born 17 November 1973) is a British fashion designer. He graduated from the University of Westminster in 1996. His first job was at Calvin Klein, followed by Bottega Veneta, Givenchy and Louis Vuitton, where he worked with Marc Jacobs. He joined Mulberry as creative director in 2005 and was instrumental in the company's success, transforming their leather goods into the must-have bags. He has also collaborated with Luella Bartley and Designer of the Year, Giles Deacon. In 2006, he won the British Fashion Council's Accessory Designer of the Year award. In July 2007 it was announced that he had been appointed creative director of Loewe, and, on 25 June 2013, Vevers was announced to be the executive creative director at American label Coach.

== Career ==
=== Mulberry ===
After Bottega Veneta, Stuart Vevers joined British luxury brand Mulberry as their creative director in 2005. In addition to leather goods like the Roxanne and the Bayswater handbags, which have become covetable fashion classics, they also produce menswear, womenswear, and footwear for women.

During his time at Mulberry, he worked on the brand's public image through the development of bags, accessories, clothing, and an advertising campaign photographed by Steven Meisel.

In 2006 Vevers was awarded Accessory Designer of the Year at the British Fashion Design awards for his work at Mulberry.

=== Loewe ===
On 26 July 2007, it was announced that Vevers would be leaving Mulberry to replace Jose Enrique Ona Selfa as creative director at Loewe. The new appointment has Vevers based in Madrid full-time since he took up the position in January 2007. "Stuart fits the profile perfectly of what we wanted", Pierre-Yves Roussel, chief executive officer of the fashion division at LVMH – which owns Loewe – told WWD. "We have been making operational changes at the brand recently. Now we want to emphasize Loewe's strong point – leather goods – with someone who can make desirable handbags." "I've loved working with Stuart, who is a great designer", says Lisa Montague, Mulberry's chief operating officer. "He has built a strong team, bringing a wealth of talent to the brand and the search is now on to find a suitable successor to take Mulberry to the next level." That successor would be Emma Hill, who has worked on accessories for many of the world's top brands, including Gap, Chloé and Marc Jacobs.

=== Coach ===
On 25 June 2013, it was announced that Stuart would be leaving Loewe to join American label Coach as executive creative director. Vevers succeeds Reed Krakoff at the leather goods label, who stepped down (following a 16-year tenure) to focus on his eponymous fashion line. In 2017 Vevers won the CFDA Accessory Designer of the Year award for his work at Coach, an award he has been nominated for every year since.

== Personal life ==
Vevers lives with his husband, the designer Benjamin Seidler, in New York City since 2014, the year they were married. The wedding was held in their house in the Lake District, UK and featured in Vogue. They have been together since 2008, when they met in Paris. They welcomed twins via surrogacy in 2020 and another daughter in 2026. They have a country house in Connecticut. In 2025, Vevers was Awarded an OBE by King Charles III for Services to Fashion.
