= Gabriel Stulman =

American restaurateur

- Education: University of Wisconsin–Madison College of Letters and Science
- Known for: CEO and founder of Happy Cooking Hospitality

Gabriel Stulman is the CEO and founder of Happy Cooking Hospitality. His New York City restaurants include Fairfax, Jeffrey's Grocery, and Joseph Leonard. In September 2023, he opened Sailor with chef April Bloomfield.

== Biography ==
Raised in a Jewish family in Fairfax, Virginia, Stulman is a 2003 graduate of the University of Wisconsin–Madison with a double major in history and political science. He started college with the intention of becoming a history teacher, working as a bartender and at restaurants.

He moved to NYC after graduating and two years later, opened Little Owl. Stulman opened Market Table soon after.

He and his wife Gina, who helps him run Happy Cooking, have a son.

== Awards and honors ==
Esquire named him Restaurateur of the Year in 2012. The year before, Crain's New York included him in their 40 under 40 list.
