= Miles Cahn =

American designer

- Born: April 18, 1921; New York City, New York
- Died: February 10, 2017 (aged 95); Manhattan, New York City, New York
- Education: City College of New York
- Known for: founding Coach New York
- Relatives: Mario Batali (son-in-law)

Miles Cahn (April 18, 1921 – February 10, 2017) was an American businessman and designer who co-founded the Coach Leatherware Company, now known as Coach, Inc./Coach New York, with his wife, Lillian Cahn, in 1961. The Cahns founded the luxury fashion company, now known for its handbags, when they purchased a ting mall wallet manufacturer, then located in West 34th Street in Manhattan, and renamed it Coach. Under the guidance of Lillian and Miles Cahn, Coach was among the first to introduce lines of purses and handbags that were both fashionable and practical.

== Biography ==
Cahn was born on April 18, 1921, in New York City to Russian Jewish immigrant parents, Jacob and Fanny Cahn. His parents were refugees who had fled from Russia to the United States to escape the Russian Revolution. He enrolled at the City College of New York, but left to serve in the United States Army's 78th Infantry Division during World War II. Cahn returned to the City College of New York after the war and received his degree in business administration. In 1947, he married Lillian Lenovitz; the couple had met in New York City.

The company that would become Coach started as a small men's wallet manufacturer known as Gail Leather Products (also called Gail Novelty Co.), located in a loft in Manhattan in 1941. Miles Cahn's father was one of four investors who had each invested $1,000 in 1941 to help start the company. In 1946, Miles Cahn joined Gail Leather for $50 a week.

In 1961, the Cahns purchased the Gail Leather Products, then located on West 34th Street, through a leveraged buyout of the former owners. They renamed their store and factory the Coach Leatherware Company (now known as Coach, Inc.). It was Lillian Cahn who suggested adding women's handbags to the Coach product line utilizing the same supple, flexible cowhide inspired by the material used in baseball gloves. Miles Cahn initially resisted his wife's idea, but relented, remembering in a 2013 interview, "I scoffed at first...In New York, there were a lot of handbag companies, and at that time, stores were all buying knockoffs of bags made in Europe. But my wife prevailed." The new handbags proved to be Coach's most popular, long-term products. Lillian Cahn designed the first Coach handbag, a shopping bag purse, which she based on the paper shopping bags she had delivered as a child for her family's business in Wilkes-Barre, Pennsylvania. Lillian Cahn's bag purse remains one of Coach's most popular designs.

Miles and Lillian Cahn also hired designer Bonnie Cashin, who created some of Coach's other signature bags and accessories, including the bucket bag and tongue bag, as well as Coach's trademark turn lock fastenings. She also introduced brighter colors to the designs.

During the 1960s, both Cahns turned to philanthropic work in support of the Food Bank For New York City and the New York Public Library. He also took out a full-page ad in the New York Times, addressed to then President Richard Nixon, to protest the Vietnam War.

By the 1980s, Coach's annual sales reached $20 million. In July 1985, the Sara Lee Corporation acquired Coach from Miles and Lillian Cahn for an estimated $30 million. Sara Lee expanded Cahn's original product line to include perfume, sunglasses and other luxury accessories. In 2000, Sara Lee spun off Coach into a separate business for approximately one billion dollars. Coach reported $4.4 billion in total sales in 2016.

Following the sale of Coach, the Cahns founded the Coach Farm on 600-acres in Pine Plains, New York, where they produced aged and fresh goat cheese. As the business expanded, their original herd of 200 goats grew to more than 1,500 animals. In 2003, Cahn wrote about their experiences as farmers and cheesemakers in "The Perils and Pleasures of Domesticating Goat Cheese". They sold the farm in 2006 when Miles Cahn, who was 85-years old at the time, retired.

Cahn focused on writing during his later years. In 2008, he self-published his memoir, "My Story".

Miles Cahn, a resident of the Upper West Side, died in his apartment in Manhattan on February 10, 2017, at the age of 95. He was survived by his three children - Julie Cahn, David Cahn and Susi Cahn, wife of celebrity chef Mario Batali; and five grandchildren. His wife and business partner, Coach designer and co-founder Lillian Cahn, died in 2013 at the age of 89.
