= Halcyon Days (company) =

HALCYON DAYS
- Industry: Luxury goods Retail
- Founded: 1950; 76 years ago in London, England, United Kingdom
- Founder: Susan Benjamin
- Headquarters: Knightsbridge, London, England, United Kingdom
- Products: English-made luxury goods and objets d'Art in the form of: Enamelware, bone china etc
- Owner: Pamela Harper
- Subsidiaries: Caverswall China Company Ltd.

HALCYON DAYS is a British business which has held 5 Royal Warrants and has been honoured to supply the Royal Family for over 50 years. His Majesty Kings Charles in 2024 granted the Royal Warrant to HALCYON DAYS. Royal Warrants to the British Royal Household as Suppliers of objets d'art – one of only 14 businesses to hold all five.

Specialists in English-made luxury goods, the business has two factories; one for enamelware in Wolverhampton and the other for English fine bone china in the heart of the pottery industry, Stoke-on-Trent.

The company operates its primary retail store within HARRODS in London and its head office and showroom in London's Knightsbridge.

== History ==
Established in 1950 as an emporium of antique gifts in Mayfair, London, specialising in 17th and 18th century-style enamelware made in the Midlands, Halcyon Days is one of only fourteen companies in the world to hold all three Royal Warrants to the British Royal Household.

Over the years, the business has collaborated with The Wallace Collection, The National Gallery, Blenheim Palace, Smithsonian Institution, The Frick, International Churchill Society, Harrods, Fortnum & Mason, Nina Campbell, British Museum, Oxford Philharmonic Orchestra, Tate Gallery, and the artist Ralph Heimans.

Presently the company holds licenses with Historic Royal Palaces, Gordon Castle, and the Castle of Mey.
