= Michelin House =

Former UK headquarters of Michelin Tyre Company

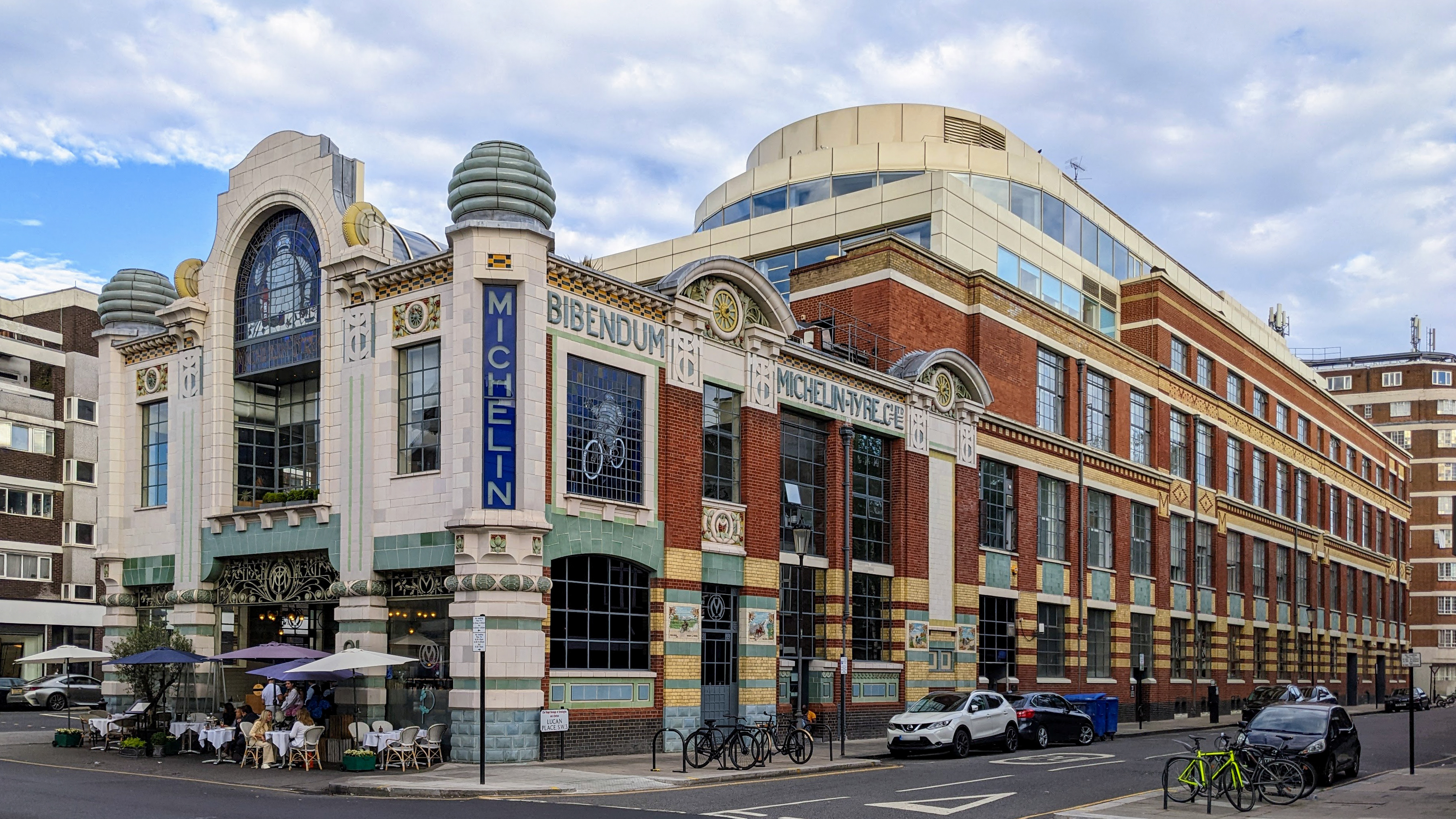
- Michelin House in September 2022

- Location within Royal Borough of Kensington and Chelsea Location within Greater London

General information
- Location: 81 Fulham Road, Chelsea, London, London, England
- Coordinates: 51°29′35.99″N 0°10′07.96″W
- Opened: January 20, 1911; 115 years ago

Design and construction
- Architect: François Espinasse
- Known for: Michelin Tyre Company headquarters

Listed Building – Grade II
- Official name: Michelin House
- Designated: 15 April 1969
- Reference no.: 1080656

Michelin House at 81 Fulham Road, Chelsea, London, was built as the first permanent UK headquarters and tyre depot of the French multinational tyre company Michelin. The building opened on 20 January 1911.

In 1987, following a major redevelopment by Terence Conran and Paul Hamlyn, Michelin House was converted into a mixed-use building containing offices, retail space, restaurants and a bar.

== History ==
=== Construction and early years ===
Following the expiry of the Dunlop tyre patents in Britain, Michelin opened a London office in 1904 in anticipation of entering the British market. The Michelin Tyre Company Limited was incorporated in June 1905, and the company soon required larger premises for its expanding operations.

After considering several possible locations, Michelin acquired a site on Fulham Road in 1909, at the junction of Fulham Road, Sloane Avenue, Leader Street and Lucan Place. The final designs for Michelin House were completed on 4 April 1910, and construction began shortly afterwards.

Designed by Michelin employee François Espinasse, an engineer in Michelin's construction department at Clermont-Ferrand, the building was completed in only five months and opened on 20 January 1911.

The building was designed both as a company headquarters and as a tyre depot. Its ground floor included tyre-fitting bays where motorists could have their tyres changed, while the basement provided storage for more than 30,000 tyres.

=== Architecture and decoration ===
Michelin House is notable for its decorative design combining elements of Art Nouveau and early Art Deco. The building features three large stained-glass windows based on Michelin advertisements of the period, all depicting the Michelin character Bibendum.

The main façade features a stained-glass representation of Bibendum from the series Nunc est bibendum, while the window on Lucan Place shows Bibendum riding a bicycle. The Sloane Avenue window reproduces the famous advertisement by O'Galop featuring "the blow of the sole".

Around the original building at street level, and inside the entrance hall, 34 decorative panels depict famous racing cars and drivers associated with Michelin tyres, including events such as Paris–Brest–Paris and the Gordon Bennett Cup.

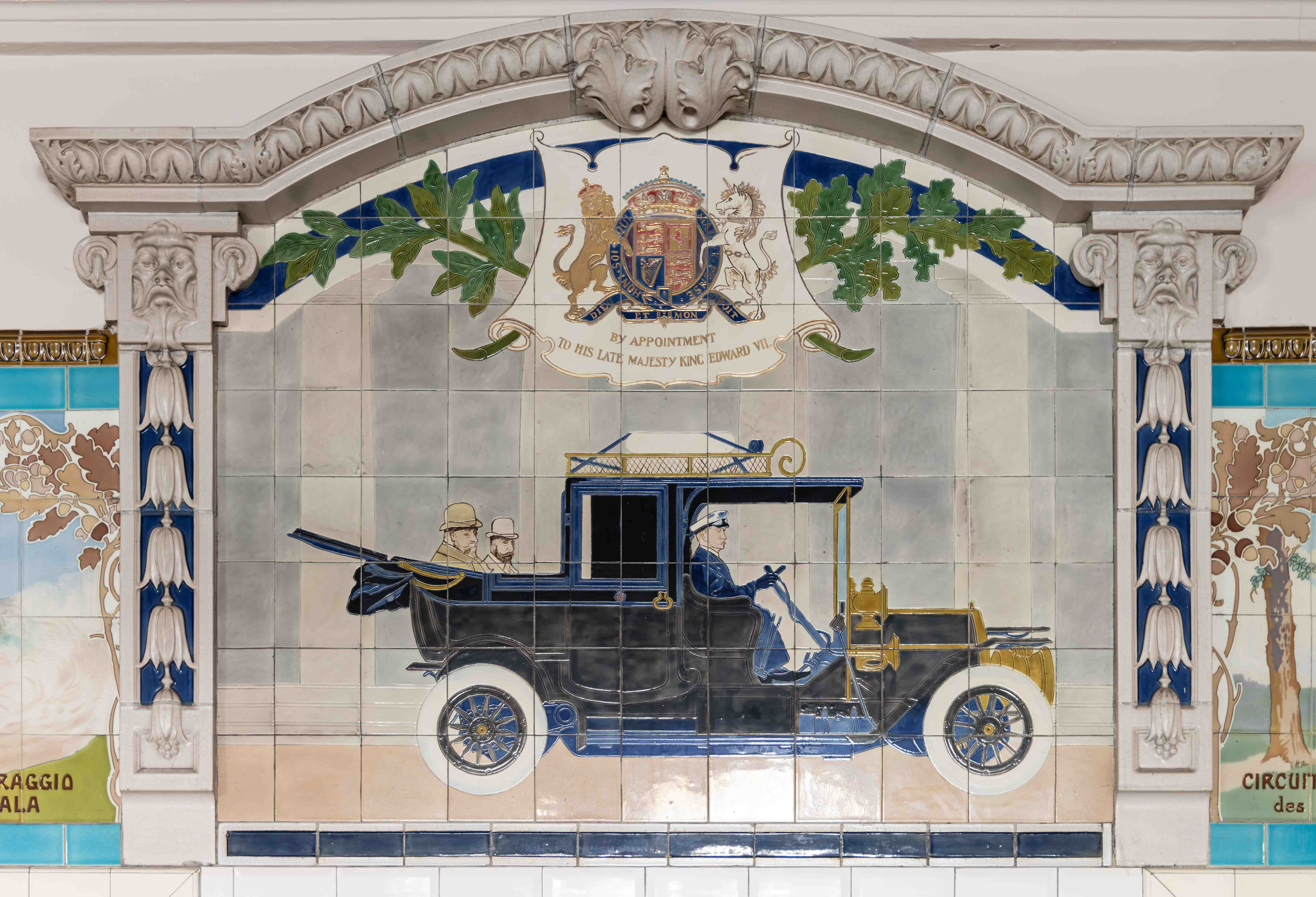
Tile panel inside the entrance hall commemorating the Royal Warrant granted to Michelin by King Edward VII.

The entrance hall contains a mosaic showing Bibendum holding a glass filled with nuts, bolts and other objects, accompanied by the Latin phrase Nunc est Bibendum ("Now is the time to drink"). The façade is framed by two corner towers topped with glass cupolas resembling stacks of tyres.

The Michelin company's links with motoring tourism are also represented by engraved images of Paris streets on several first-floor windows.

=== Technical features ===
Michelin House is an early example of reinforced concrete construction in Britain. The building was constructed using the Hennebique ferro-concrete system, which allowed large open spaces suitable for tyre storage while providing improved fire resistance.

The original floors used hollow pot tiles, a system which combined durability with fireproofing qualities. Other original features included automatic entrance doors and a weighing bay where customers' vehicles could be weighed to ensure correct tyre pressure.

=== Michelin ownership ===
On opening, Michelin House provided facilities for motorists, including a touring office where visitors could obtain maps and plan journeys.

The building was extended several times after its opening, including additions in 1912 and 1922. In 1927 Michelin opened a tyre factory at Stoke-on-Trent, and in 1930 the company's British headquarters moved there. Michelin continued to occupy parts of Michelin House, while other areas were leased.

During the Second World War, the three stained-glass windows were removed in 1940 to protect them from bombing. They were stored at Michelin's Stoke-on-Trent factory but were later lost.

In 1960 Michelin and its tenants began a modernisation programme inside the building. Although proposals were considered to alter the exterior, the main front section of Michelin House was listed as a Grade II building on the National Heritage List for England on 15 April 1969.

== Sale and redevelopment ==
In 1985 Michelin decided to sell the building, which no longer matched the company's office requirements. It was purchased in August 1985 by publisher Paul Hamlyn and restaurateur and retailer Sir Terence Conran for £8 million.

Conran and Hamlyn established Michelin House Developments to redevelop the building while preserving its architectural character. The project was designed by Conran Roche and Yorke Rosenberg Mardall (YRM).

The redevelopment increased the usable floor area and introduced new office, retail and restaurant spaces. It included the restoration or recreation of several original features, including the decorative elements of the façade, the glass cupolas and replicas of the stained-glass windows which had been removed during the Second World War and subsequently lost.

The redevelopment created offices for Hamlyn's company Octopus Publishing, as well as the Bibendum Restaurant & Oyster Bar and The Conran Shop. All three opened in August 1987, when Michelin House reopened.

== Later history ==
In the late 1990s, Reed/Octopus Publishing left Michelin House. In 1999, Monitor Group, an international strategy consulting firm, moved into the office space.

On 20 January 2011, Michelin House celebrated the centenary of its opening. The event was marked by the building's then occupants, Bibendum Restaurant and The Conran Shop, together with Michelin. As part of the centenary celebrations, Michelin renewed efforts to locate the original stained-glass windows and established a public appeal website and telephone hotline.

In 2023, The Conran Shop, which had occupied Michelin House since the 1987 redevelopment, left the building and relocated to Sloane Street.

In August 2025, Claude Bosi at Bibendum and the Oyster Bar closed permanently after several decades of operation at Michelin House, following disagreements concerning the renewal of the lease.

The florist Petals London, located in the entrance hall of Michelin House, remains in operation.

Since 2024, the first, second and third floors of Michelin House have been occupied by Argyll, which provides serviced office space for businesses.
