= Lewis Frankfort =

American businessman

Lewis 'Lew' Frankfort
- Education: Hunter College (A.B.); Columbia Business School (M.B.A.)
- Occupations: retired, former CEO of Coach, Inc.

Lewis "Lew" Frankfort is the chairman and former CEO of Coach, Inc. He released his business memoir, "Bag Man," on October 14, 2025.

== Early life and career ==
Frankfort was born in The Bronx, and holds a B.A. from Hunter College and an M.B.A. from Columbia Business School. Frankfort joined Coach in 1979 as the Vice President of New Business Development. In this capacity, he spearheaded the development of Coach stores and its introduction into international markets. When Coach was acquired in 1985 by Sara Lee Corporation, Frankfort was appointed president of Coach. In 1995, he was appointed chairman and CEO. In 2014, Lewis Frankfort was succeeded by Victor Luis as CEO of Coach.
