= Mario Batali =

American chef (born 1960)

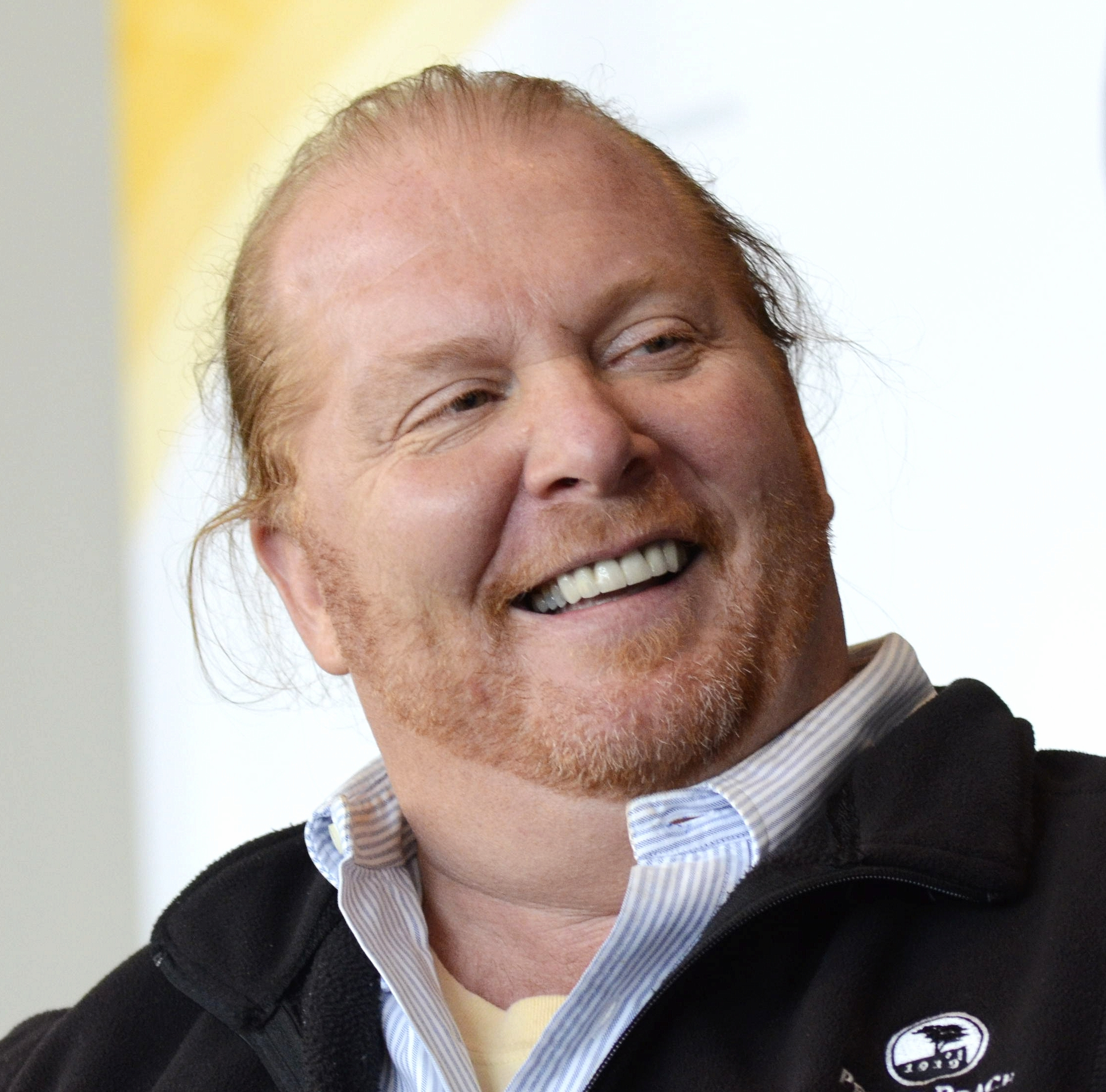
- Batali in 2012
- Born: Mario Francesco Batali; September 19, 1960 (age 66); Seattle, Washington, U.S.
- Education: Rutgers University; Le Cordon Bleu
- Spouse: Susi Cahn (m. 1994)
- Children: 2
- Relatives: Miles Cahn; Lillian Cahn (founders of Coach Inc.)
- Culinary career
- Cooking style: Italian
- Rating
- Babbo Michelin stars (2005–2007, 2014–2019)
- Current restaurant
- Italian Wine Merchant (shop)
- Previous restaurants
- The Spotted Pig (investor); Babbo (restaurant); Lupa Osteria Romana; Esca; Otto Enoteca Pizzeria; Casa Mono; Bar Jamon; Del Posto; La Sirena; Enoteca San Marco (renamed Otto); B&B Ristorant; Carnevino, (last three located in Las Vegas; all others are located in New York City); Tarry Lodge; Eataly
- Television shows
- Molto Mario; Ciao America with Mario Batali; Iron Chef America; Mario, Full Boil; The Chew "Moltissimo"; Mario Eats Italy
- Website: www.mariobatali.com

Mario Francesco Batali (born September 19, 1960) is an American chef, writer, and former restaurateur. Batali co-owned restaurants mainly in New York City along with Las Vegas, and Los Angeles including his flagship restaurant Babbo in New York City, which received a Michelin star for several years. Other notable Batali restaurants were Del Posto, Lupa, and The Spotted Pig where Batali was an investor. Batali has appeared on the Food Network, on shows such as Molto Mario and Iron Chef America, on which he was one of the featured "Iron Chefs". From 2011 to 2017, he was a host on ABC's The Chew. In 2017, the restaurant review site Eater revealed multiple accusations of sexual misconduct against Batali and, in March 2019, he sold all his restaurant holdings.

== Early life ==
Batali was born in Seattle on September 19, 1960, to Marilyn (LaFramboise) and Armandino Batali, who founded Seattle's Salumi restaurant in 2006. His father is of Italian descent and his mother is of part French-Canadian ancestry. His paternal grandmother was from Chieti, while his paternal grandfather hailed from Lucca. Batali attended Rutgers University in New Brunswick, New Jersey, while working as a cook at the pub/restaurant Stuff Yer Face. While at Rutgers, he was roommates with actor James Gandolfini. Batali graduated from Rutgers in 1982.

In 1994, he married Susi Cahn and together they have two sons. Batali is the son-in-law of Miles and Lillian Cahn, founders of Coach New York. Batali's brother Dana Batali was Director of Pixar RenderMan development from 2001 to 2015.

== Career ==
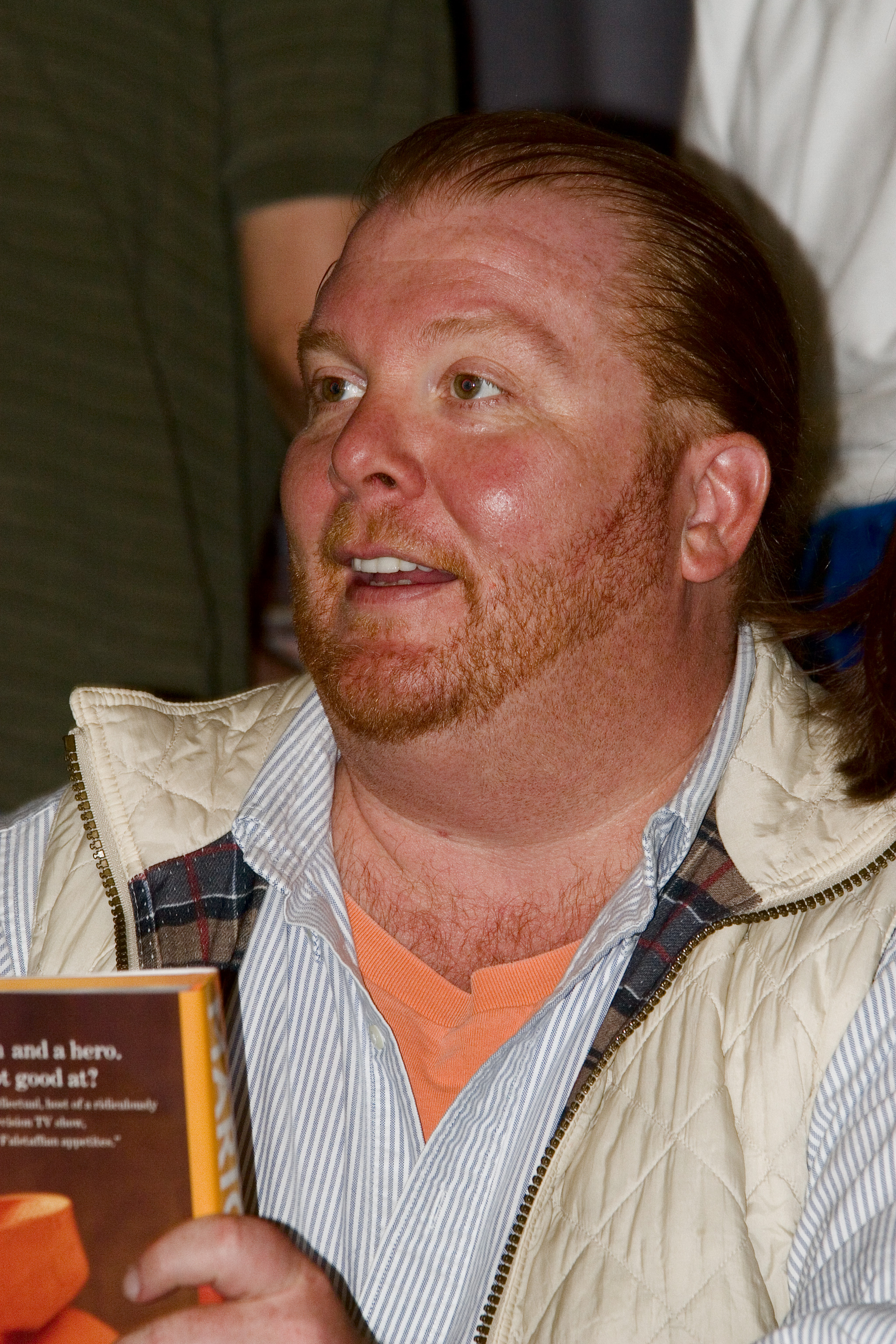
Batali in 2005

At 29, Batali was a sous chef at the Four Seasons Biltmore in Santa Barbara after previously working as a sous chef for the then-Four Seasons Clift Hotel San Francisco (since 1995, known as "The Clift", under changed ownership). Early in his career, Batali worked with chef Jeremiah Tower at his San Francisco restaurant Stars. Stars was open from 1984 until 1999 and is considered one of the birthplaces of the institution of the celebrity chef. Batali appeared in his main Food Network show Molto Mario which aired from 1996 to 2004 and focused on Italian Cooking. The show made Batali a household name and popularized the Food Network. Batali was also a star in other Food Network shows such as Iron Chef America, Ciao America with Mario Batali, and Mario Eats Italy.

In 1998, Batali, Joe Bastianich, and Lidia Bastianich formed the B&B Hospitality Group, also known as Batali & Bastianich Hospitality Group. The flagship restaurant for B&B is Babbo in New York City which had a Michelin star for several years.

Batali was a co-host of the ABC daytime talk show The Chew from its premiere in 2011 until 2017.

In 2012, a lawsuit was settled by Batali (and B&B) with 117 members of the restaurant staff, who alleged that the Batali organization had skimmed a percentage of the tip pools in his restaurants over a period of years.

== Philanthropy and social activism ==
Batali is a critic of hydraulic fracturing, commonly known as fracking, a method of natural gas extraction. He has signed onto the cause of Chefs for the Marcellus, whose mission is to "protect [New York's] regional foodshed from the dangers of hydraulic fracturing for natural gas (fracking)." In May 2013, Batali co-wrote an opinion article with chef Bill Telepan for the New York Daily News, in which the two wrote that "Fracking ... could do serious damage to [New York's] agricultural industry and hurt businesses, like ours, that rely on safe, healthy, locally sourced foods." Batali was the subject of a 2007 book titled Heat by Bill Buford which detailed his philosophy to various aspects of social activism, as well as cooking and life.

Batali served as an ambassador and on the board of directors for The Lunchbox Fund, a non-profit organization which provides a daily meal to students of township schools in Soweto, South Africa. In December 2017, Batali stepped down from his role with the organization in response to sexual misconduct allegations against him.

In 2008, Batali and his wife Susi Cahn founded the Mario Batali Foundation, funding various children's educational programs and pediatric disease research.

He supports the practice of Transcendental Meditation through the David Lynch Foundation.

== Cooking philosophy ==
In a 2012 interview, Batali said that good Italian cooking was characterized by simplicity, an insight he attributed to his time working at a restaurant in Borgo Capanne, Italy.

== Sexual misconduct allegations ==
On December 11, 2017, restaurant news website Eater reported that four women accused Batali of sexual harassment and sexual assault. By the following day, four more women had come forward. Batali took a leave of absence from his position at the management company Batali & Bastianich Hospitality Group. Producers of ABC's The Chew fired him on December 14, 2017. Food Network halted plans to release episodes of his television show Molto Mario after the allegations. Target announced that it was no longer selling Batali's pasta sauces and cookbooks.

In May 2018, more accusations of sexual assault against Batali were aired on an episode of 60 Minutes, and the New York Police Department confirmed it was investigating Batali for his past behavior, including an alleged assault that took place at The Spotted Pig, a restaurant where Batali was an investor. Batali denied an allegation of sexual assault, but said "My past behavior has been deeply inappropriate and I am sincerely remorseful for my actions." Days later, Batali's company B&B Hospitality Group announced it would be closing its three Las Vegas Strip restaurants after the Las Vegas Sands Corporation terminated the companies' relationship.

In January 2019, New York City police declined to charge Batali over two alleged sexual assaults in his New York City restaurants due to insufficient evidence.

In March 2019, Batali forfeited ownership of his stakes in Batali & Bastianich Hospitality Group, a partnership between Batali and the Bastianich family, including Joe and Lidia Bastianich. He also sold his minority ownership in Eataly, an Italian food marketplace. The Bastianiches said B&B Hospitality Group's name would change. Batali was the first chef to surrender ownerships in all his restaurants after reports of sexual misconduct.

In July 2021, Batali, Bastianich, and their former restaurant company agreed to a settlement in the New York state case that was under investigation by the Attorney General of New York wherein they would pay $600,000 to more than 20 former employees (men and women) of three restaurants in Manhattan.

=== Trial and acquittal ===
In May 2019, Batali was charged with indecent assault and battery in Boston. In court, the accuser alleged that Batali had groped her in April 2017 at a bar in Boston. Batali pleaded not guilty and chose a bench trial.

On May 10, 2022, Batali was acquitted in Boston Municipal Court by a judge who ruled that Batali's conduct during the alleged incident was "not befitting of a public person of his stature" but agreed with the defense's arguments that his accuser had credibility issues.

== Television and movie credits ==
Show name	Year	Network	Role	Notes & citation
Molto Mario	1996–2004	Food Network	Host	A culinary tour of Italy, hosted by Batali
Mediterranean Mario	1998	Food Network	Host	A culinary tour of Morocco, Spain, France, Greece, hosted by Batali
Mario Eats Italy	2001–2002	Food Network	Host	A culinary tour of the Italian countryside
Ciao America with Chef Mario Batali	2003	Food Network	Host	A culinary tour of the Italian in America; only three episodes
Iron Chef America: Battle of the Masters		Food Network		
Iron Chef America: The Series		Food Network	Judge or participant	
ICA: All-Star Special				
Mario, Full Boil	2007	Food Network		A one-hour documentary special, following Batali and Bastianich opening an Italian restaurant in New York City (Del Posto)
Emeril Live	2006	Food Network	Guest appearance	"Italian Favorites with Mario Batali"
Chefography	2006, 2007	Food Network	Guest appearances	Season 0, episode 7 and season 2, episode 6
Anthony Bourdain: No Reservations	2005	Travel Channel	Guest appearance	Season 1, episode 3: "New Jersey"
Spain... on the Road Again	2008	PBS	Co-host	
Fantastic Mr. Fox	2009	20th Century Fox	Rabbit	Stop-motion animated film directed by Wes Anderson, based on the book by Roald Dahl
The Daily Show	2010, 2011, 2012	Comedy Central	Guest appearances	
Faces of America	2010	PBS	Guest appearance	
Bitter Feast	2010	Dark Sky Films	Gordon	American psychological horror film directed and written by Joe Maggio
Saturday Night Live	2010		Cameo	
The Chew	2011–2017	ABC	Co-host	
Good Morning America			Guest appearances	
Fuck, That's Delicious	2016	Viceland	Guest star	Season 2, episode 6: "The Caesar Brothers"
Moltissimo	2017–2017	Viceland/Munchies	Host	
Worth It	2017	BuzzFeed	Guest appearance	Season 2, episode 5: "$2 Pizza vs. $2,000 Pizza, New York City"
The Simpsons	2017		Guest appearance	Treehouse of Horror XXVIII
The Untitled Action Bronson Show	2017	Season 1, Episode 19, Mario Batali, Joanna Jędrzejczyk	Talk show guest	

== Awards ==
- 1998 – "Best New Restaurant of 1998" from the James Beard Foundation for "Babbo Ristorante e Enoteca"
- 1999 – "Man of the Year" in GQ's chef category
- 2001 – D'Artagnan Cervena Who's Who of Food & Beverage in America
- 2002 – "Best Chef: New York City" from the James Beard Foundation
- 2004 – Three Stars from The New York Times for "Babbo Ristorante e Enoteca" from Ruth Reichl.
- 2005 – "All-Clad Cookware Outstanding Chef Award" from the James Beard Foundation (national award)
- 2008 – One Michelin star, Babbo Ristorante e Enoteca, Michelin Guide
- 2008 – "Best Restaurateur" for Joe Bastianich/Mario Batali for Babbo Ristorante e Enoteca from the James Beard Foundation.
- Culinary Hall of Fame Induction.

== Works ==
- Mario Batali Simple Italian Food: Recipes from My Two Villages (1998), ISBN 0-609-60300-0
- Mario Batali Holiday Food: Family Recipes for the Most Festive Time of the Year (2000), ISBN 0-609-60774-X
- Vino Italiano: The Regional Wines of Italy (contributor) (2002), ISBN 0-609-60848-7
- The Babbo Cookbook (2002), ISBN 0-609-60775-8
- The Artist's Palate (foreword) (2003), ISBN 0-7894-7768-8
- Molto Italiano: 327 Simple Italian Recipes to Cook at Home (2005), ISBN 0-06-073492-2
- Mario Tailgates NASCAR Style (2006), ISBN 0-89204-846-8
- Spain...A Culinary Road Trip (2008), written with Gwyneth Paltrow, and Julia Turshen. ISBN 978-0-06-156093-4
- Italian Grill (2008), written with Judith Sutton. ISBN 978-0-06-145097-6
- Molto Gusto: Easy Italian Cooking (2010), written with Mark Ladner. ISBN 978-0-06-192432-3
- Molto Batali: Simple Family Meals from My Home to Yours (2011), ISBN 978-0-06-209556-5
- America – Farm to Table: Simple, Delicious Recipes Celebrating Local Farmers written with Jim Webster
- Mediterranean Summer, A Season on France's Côte d/Azur and Italy's Costa Bella (2007), written by David Shalleck and Erol Munuz ISBN 978-0-7679-2048-3 Contributor Foreword by Mario Batali

Batali is also a main subject of Bill Buford's book Heat: An Amateur's Adventures as Kitchen Slave, Line Cook, Pasta-Maker, and Apprentice to a Dante-Quoting Butcher in Tuscany (2007) ISBN 978-1400034475
