= Lillian Cahn =

American fashion designer (1923–2013)

- Born: Lillian Lenovitz; December 11, 1923; Sátoraljaújhely, Hungary
- Died: March 4, 2013 (aged 89); Manhattan, New York City
- Occupation: businessperson
- Known for: Co-Founder of Coach New York
- Relatives: Mario Batali (son-in-law)

Lillian Cahn (née Lenovitz; December 11, 1923 – March 4, 2013) was a Hungarian-born American businessperson who co-founded Coach New York with her husband, Miles Cahn. Lillian Cahn also created Coach's first line of handbags, which remains the label's trademark consumer product. She had emigrated to the United States with her family during the Great Depression. After selling Coach in 1985, the Cahns operated a goat farm and cheese-making business in Pine Plains, New York.

== Biography ==
=== Early life ===
Lillian Cahn was born Lillian Lenovitz on December 11, 1923 in Sátoraljaújhely. She emigrated to the United States with her family during the Great Depression.

=== Coach ===
Coach's original line of products focused on men's wallets and billfolds in 1941. It was Lillian who suggested the company branch out into women's handbags. "I scoffed at first," Mr. Cahn told the New York Times. "In New York, there were a lot of handbag companies, and at that time stores were all buying knockoffs of bags made in Europe. But my wife prevailed." Cahn also designed the first handbags, based on paper shopping bags she had used as a child in Pennsylvania. NPR (National Public Radio) called her "the force behind today's high-end leather handbags."

=== After Coach ===
After selling Coach in 1985, the Cahns operated a goat farm and cheese-making business in Pine Plains, New York. Cahn died in Manhattan, New York City, on March 4, 2013, at the age of 89 and was buried in Pine Plains. She was survived by her husband of 66 years, Coach co-founder Miles Cahn, who died in February 2017 and her daughter Susi Cahn and her husband chef Mario Batali.

Cahn was posthumously inducted into the Luzerne County Arts & Entertainment Hall of Fame in 2025.
