= Nana Kwasi Wiafe =

Ghanaian model and stylist

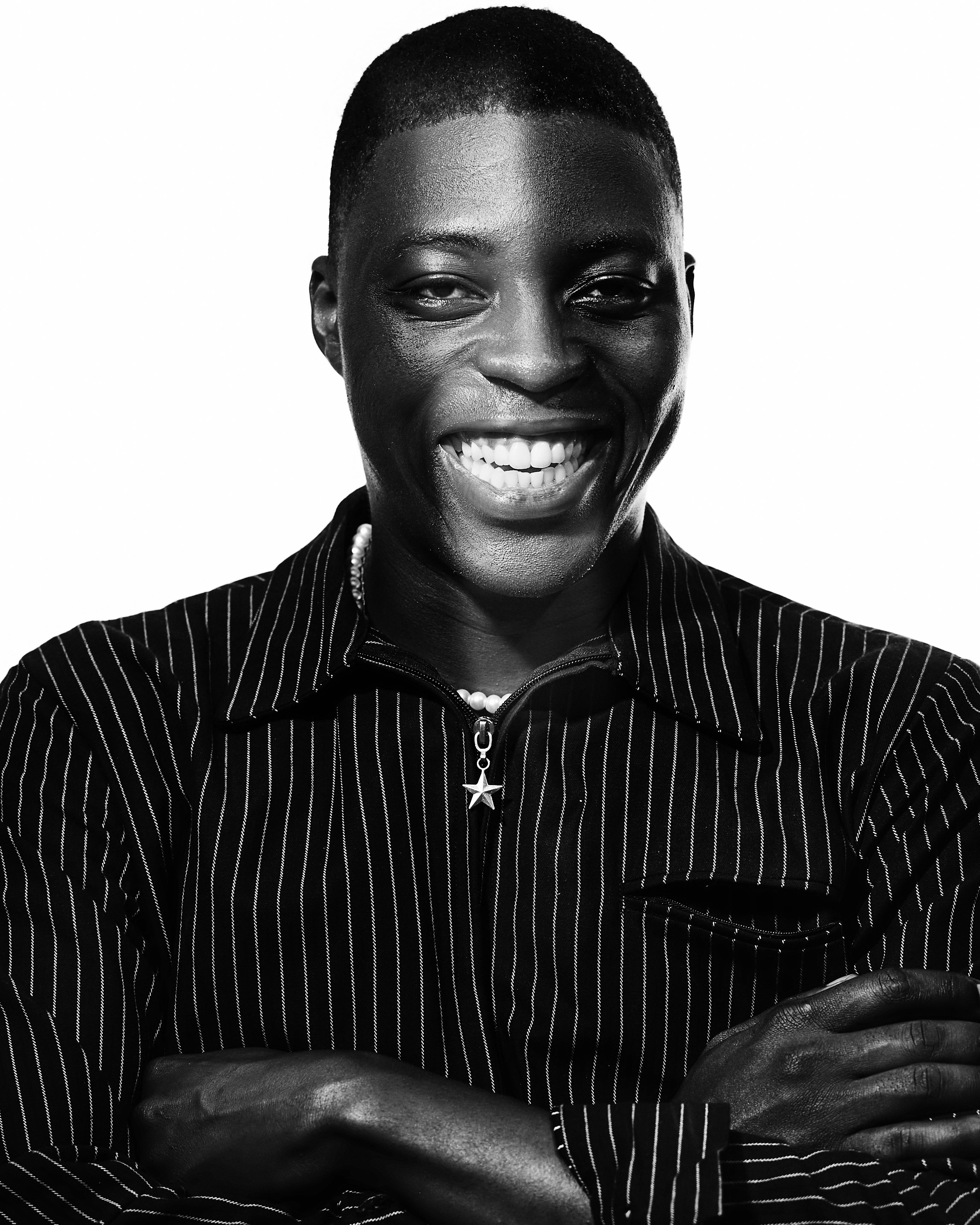
- Portrait of Nana Kwasi Wiafe
- Born: Gideon Akwasi Wiafe; July 22, 1990 (age 35); Accra, Ghana
- Occupation(s): Creative director, Stylist, Model, Founder Very Ghanaian
- Years active: 2016 – present
- Modeling information
- Height: 6 ft 0 in (1.83 m)
- Agency: Boss Models (Johannesburg); My Friend Ned (Cape Town)
- Website: Official website

Gideon Akwasi Wiafe (born July 22, 1990) also known as Nana Kwasi Wiafe is a Ghanaian international fashion model, stylist and creative director. He is the founder of ThouArtKwasi, a high fashion styling brand that seeks to create high end fashion editorial looks and esthetics that reflects the stories of individuals and brands in Ghana and other African countries.

== Early life and education ==
He had his education at Data Link University College in Tema, Ghana.

== Career ==
Nana Kwasi got his first break when he was photographed by Ghanaian American based Photographer/Creative Director Joshua Kissi & Ghanaian Visual artists Prince Gyasi. He has been featured in both international and local publications like Vogue, CNN Africa, BET International, Afropunk, Nowness, Art News Africa, Okay Africa, Debonair Afrik, Nataal Media, Sunday Times S.A and M Le Magazine Du Monde.

Nana Kwasi featured in both international and local music videos for Sarkodie, Serious Klein, M.anifest and Tneeya. He has worked with a wide range of photographers Joshua Kissi, Trevor Stuurman, Prince Gyasi, Travys Owen, Iseeadifferentyou, Justice Mukheli, Kyle Weeks, Francis Kokoroko and others. Also Nana Kwasi has worked with fashion brands like Ozward Boateng, Diesel, Maxhosa, Vlisco, Studio189, Chusuwannapha, Marianne Fassler, Kente Gentleman, Loza Malèmbho and Jermain Bleu.

Nana Kwasi Wiafe is founder and CEO of Ghanaian brand Very Ghanaian.

=== Styling ===
Nana Kwasi worked as a style contributor for Beyoncé's visual album Black Is King. He was one of the stylists for music Already by Beyoncé which featured Shatta Wale.

He also has worked as stylists for a few music productions Fancy by Amaarae and Guda by Ayat which won an award for Best Overall Music Video at the 4Syte Music Video Awards.

== Charity works ==
Nana Kwasi Wiafe is involved with charitable causes, He is a member of a charity foundation called Spread The Love Ghana for the past four years, for which he helps to support the homeless and kids in the city and countryside.
