= Pirelli Calendar =

Annual trade calendar

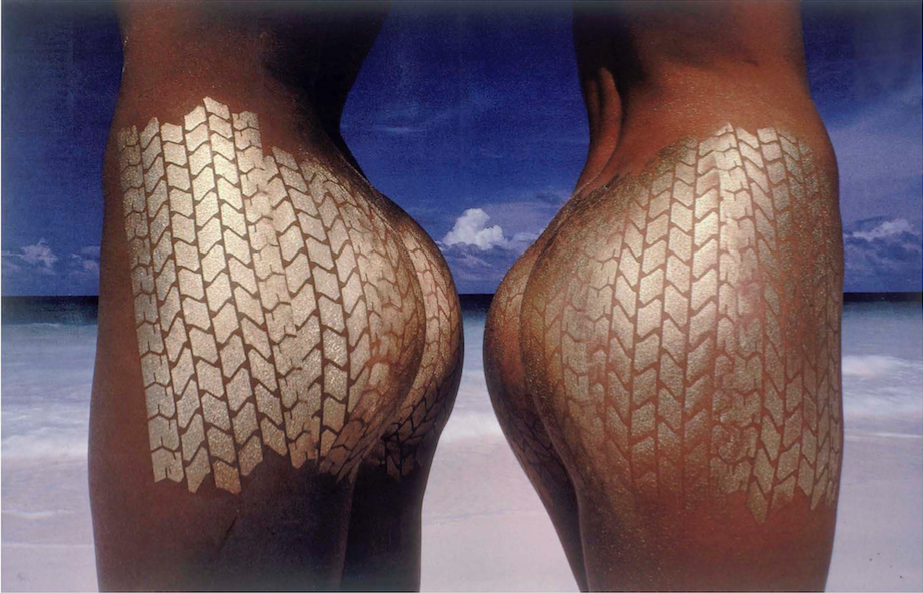
- Photograph by Uwe Ommer, the Cal 1984
- Type: Calendar
- Inventor: Derek Forsyth
- Inception: 1964; 62 years ago
- Manufacturer: Pirelli
- Website: Official website

The Pirelli Calendar, known and trade-marked as "The Cal", is an annual trade calendar which has been published by the UK subsidiary of the Italian tyre manufacturing company Pirelli since 1964. The calendar has a reputation for its choice of photographers and models and featured glamour photography from the 1980s until the 2010s.

The calendar is produced with limited availability (20,000 are printed annually). Copies do not go on sale, but are instead given as corporate gifts to celebrities and select Pirelli customers. The annual production cost was about US$2 million in 2017. Marco Tronchetti Provera, Pirelli's CEO from 1992 to 2022, commented that the purpose of the Cal is "to mark the passing of time" by recording the zeitgeist.

== History ==
The Cal was originally created by the British art director Derek Forsyth. After an unpublished mockup in 1962, it became an annual publication from 1964. In some of the earlier calendars Pirelli tyres featured prominently, though this marketing aspect was later dropped. The first woman photographer to shoot the calendar was Sarah Moon in 1972. Publication was discontinued after the 1974 issue as an economizing cutback in response to the world recession resulting from the 1973 oil crisis. It was resurrected 10 years later and has been published regularly since then except for 2021.

For the first ten years of the calendar's existence, it included photographs of fully clothed women, but an emphasis on nudity developed during the 1980s. The 1987 calendar, photographed by Terrence Donovan, was the first to feature only black models, included a bare-bottomed 16-year-old Naomi Campbell. The models were photographed topless in Savannah-like settings and styled in tribal fashion. The calendar continued to use mainly eroticised images until the mid-2010s, although in some instances the pictures taken by the photographers were considered by the editors to be too risqué to use.

From the mid-2010s the calendar moved away from eroticism, and around this time diversity began to be addressed. The 2008 calendar was photographed by Patrick Demarchelier in Shanghai and included a number of Asian models. At the same time a book, The Complete Works: The Pirelli Calendar 1964–2007, was published by Mondadori. The 2010 calendar, photographed by Terry Richardson, used similar imagery to that which was used in the calendar in the 1960s. In 2014 Pirelli released an unpublished calendar from 1986 shot by photographer Helmut Newton. A 50th anniversary book, Pirelli - The Calendar: 50 Years and More, was published by Taschen in 2015.

The 2016 calendar, photographed by Annie Leibovitz, aimed to celebrate women for their accomplishments rather than their physical attributes. It included Fran Lebowitz, Mellody Hobson, Serena Williams, Yoko Ono and Patti Smith to represent inspiring women of diverse ages in almost entirely clothed portraits. The 2017 calendar was photographed by Peter Lindbergh and the women in the photographs were fully dressed and wore minimal makeup. It was the first calendar in which the photographs had not been retouched. The women photographed included Helen Mirren, Nicole Kidman and Julianne Moore. For the 2018 calendar, photographer Tim Walker chose to feature only black models, including Duckie Thot, Adwoa Aboah, RuPaul, Whoopi Goldberg, and Thando Hopa.

The 2021 calendar was cancelled because of the global coronavirus pandemic but returned for 2022, featuring musicians and titled On The Road. In 2024, to celebrate the 60th anniversary of the Cal, Prince Gyasi became the first black photographer to produce an edition of the calendar.

== Models ==
Appearance in the calendar has become a mark of distinction for those photographic models who are chosen, as well as for the photographers commissioned to produce the images used. Between 1997 and 2015 casting director Jennifer Starr also influenced the look and direction of each calendar. Over the years, the models and celebrities who have appeared in it include Alessandra Ambrosio, Bianca Balti, Ana Beatriz Barros, Malgosia Bela, Elsa Benítez, Mariacarla Boscono (3), Lauren Bush, Gisele Bündchen, Naomi Campbell (5), Gracie Carvalho, Helena Christensen, Cindy Crawford, Emanuela de Paula, Waris Dirie, Yamila Díaz, Lily Donaldson, Isabeli Fontana (8), Magdalena Frackowiak, Saskia de Brauw, Sonny Freeman Drane, Gigi Hadid, Duckie Thot, Bridget Hall, Filippa Hamilton, Miranda Kerr, Karlie Kloss, Heidi Klum, Karolína Kurková (3), Noémie Lenoir, Adriana Lima (3), Daisy Lowe, Angela Lindvall, Lakshmi Menon, Kate Moss (3), Petra Nemcová, Sasha Pivovarova, Natasha Poly, Frankie Rayder, Coco Rocha, RuPaul, Anja Rubik, Joan Smalls, Lara Stone (3), Fernanda Tavares, Caroline Trentini, Christy Turlington, Guinevere Van Seenus, Edita Vilkeviciute, Natalia Vodianova (5), Alek Wek (3), Daria Werbowy and Rosie Huntington-Whiteley.

Actresses: Patricia Arquette, Nadja Auermann, Monica Bellucci, Selma Blair, Laetitia Casta (3), Jessica Chastain, Yao Chen, Maggie Cheung, Aurélie Claudel, Lily Cole, Rachael Leigh Cook, Penélope Cruz, Lou Doillon, Julia Garner, Whoopi Goldberg, Shalom Harlow, Neith Hunter, Milla Jovovich, Nicole Kidman, James King, Nastassja Kinski, Abbey Lee Kershaw, Doutzen Kroes, Jennifer Lopez, Sophia Loren, Audrey Marnay, Sienna Rose Miller, Julianne Moore, Bridget Moynahan, Brittany Murphy, Carolyn Murphy, Lupita Nyong'o, Charlotte Rampling, Eva Riccobono, Amy Schumer, Elisa Sednaoui, Léa Seydoux, Jenny Shimizu, Amy Smart, Julia Stiles, Hilary Swank, Uma Thurman, Ai Tominaga, Naomi Watts, Kate Winslet, Robin Wright, and Zhang Ziyi.

Athlete: Serena Williams.

Dancer: Misty Copeland.

Singer: Patti Smith.

== Photographers ==
Peter Lindbergh (Note: Peter Lindbergh: The Cal 2017 "conveys personality, sensitivity and the guts to be yourself.") produced three editions of the calendar (1996, 2002, 2017) and Patrick Demarchelier (Note: Patrick Demarchelier: "Every girl we pick says yes.", [The Cal is] "the most prestigious calendar in the world".) two (2005, 2008), and they made together the 50th anniversary calendar (2014).

Harry Peccinotti, Francis Giacobetti, Brian Duffy, Terence Donovan, Clive Arrowsmith, Richard Avedon, Herb Ritts, Bruce Weber, Annie Leibovitz (Note: Annie Leibovitz for the Cal 2016: "The whole idea was not to have any pretense in these pictures, and be very straightforward, and show these women exactly who they are.") made two calendars. (Their second year marked with star [*])

In the trend of the MeToo movement and Weinstein effect, the Cal 2019 by Albert Watson (Note: "Albert Watson seeks to narrate their journey, to understand the emotive power of their dreams, the turning points, the moments of victory and defeat, and how they faced each in turn.") featured Laetitia Casta in lingerie without teasing nudity.

Year	Photographer(s)	Location(s)	Models
1963	Terence Donovan	London	unpublished
1964	Robert Freeman	Mallorca	Jane Lumb, Sonny Freeman
1965	Brian Duffy	South of France	Annabella e Virginia, Pauline Dukes, Jeannette Harding, Pauline Stone
1966	Peter Knapp	Al Hoceima, Morocco	Shirley Ann
1967	no calendar		
1968	Harry Peccinotti	Tunisia	Pat Booth, Jill la Tour, Elisa Ngai, Ulla Randall
1969	Harry Peccinotti*	California	non-professional models
1970	Francis Giacobetti	Paradise Island	Anak, Alexandra Bastedo, Paula Martine, Pipa
1971	Francis Giacobetti*	Jamaica	Caileen Bell, Kate Howard, Angela McDonald, Christine Townson
1972	Sarah Moon	Villa Les Tilleuls, Paris	Mick Lindburg, Suzanne Moncur, Boni Pfeifer, Inger Hammer, Magritt Rahn, Barbara Trethman
1973	Brian Duffy*	London	Nicki Allen, Erica Creer, Elizabeth, Kate Howard, Nicki Howorth, Kari Ann, Kubi, Jane Lumb, Penny Steele, Pauline Stone, Sue Paul, Vida, Vicky Wilks
1974	Hans Feurer	Seychelles	Chichinou, Kathy Cochaux, Kim, Marana, Eva Nielsen
1975 | 1983	no calendar		
1984	Uwe Ommer	The Bahamas	Angie Layne, Suzie-Ann Watkins, Jane Wood, Julie Martin
1985	Norman Parkinson	Edinburgh	Anna Andersen, Cecilia, Iman Abdulmajid, Lena, Sherry
1986	Bert Stern	the Cotswolds	Jane Arwood, Julia Boleno, Joni Flyn, Gloria, Caroline Hallett, Luise King, Juliet, Deborah Leng, Clare MacNamara, Samantha, Beth Toussaint, Suzy Yeo
1987	Terence Donovan*	Bath	Ione Brown, Naomi Campbell, Colette Brown, Gillian de Terville, Waris Dirie
1988	Barry Lategan; Gillian Lynne's choreography	London	Briony Brind, Victoria Dyer, Nicola Keen, Kim Lonsdale, Sharon McGorian, Noomi Sorkin, Carol Straker, Hugo Bregman
1989	Joyce Tenneson	Polaroid Studios, New York City	Susan Allcorn, Kathryn Bishop, Gretchen Eichholz, Rebecca Glen, Rosemarie Griego, Brigitte Luzar, Nicky (Nicole Nagel), Gilda Meyer-Nichof, Dannielle Scott, Akure Wall, Susan Waseen, Lisa Whiting
1990	Arthur Elgort	Seville	Laurie Bernhardt, Laure Bogeart, Christina Cadiz, Anna Klevag, Florence Poretti, Debrah Saron
1991	Clive Arrowsmith	France	Alison Fitzpatrick, Lynne Koester, Monika Kassner, Paola Siero, Nancy Liu, Katherina Trug, Jackie Old Coyote, Tracy Hudson, Rachel Boss, Carole Jimenez, Saskia van der Waarde, Rina Lucarelli, Susie Hardie-Bick
1992	Clive Arrowsmith*	Almería	Julienne Davis, Alison Fitzpatrick, Judi Taylor
1993	John Claridge	Seychelles	Christina Estrada, Barbara Moors, Claudie
1994	Herb Ritts	Paradise Island, The Bahamas	Helena Christensen, Cindy Crawford, Karen Alexander, Kate Moss
1995	Richard Avedon	New York	Christy Turlington, Naomi Campbell, Farrah Summerford, Nadja Auermann
1996	Peter Lindbergh	El Mirage, California	Carré Otis, Kristen McMenamy, Eva Herzigová, Navia Nguyen, Nastassja Kinski, Tatjana Patitz
1997	Richard Avedon*	New York	Honor Fraser, Ling Tan, Monica Bellucci, Sophie Patitz, Cordula Reyer, Inés Sastre, Waris Dirie, Anna Klevhag, Gisele Zelauy, Irina Pantaeva, Kristina Semenovskaia, Tatiana Zavialova, Marie Sophie Wilson, Jenny Shimizu, Brandi Quiñones, Nikki Uberti, Julia Ortiz, Annie Morton
1998	Bruce Weber	Miami	Tanga Moreau, Stella Tennant, Milla Jovovich, Carolyn Murphy, Eva Herzigová, Patricia Arquette, Kirsty Hume, Shalom Harlow, Elaine Irwin Mellencamp, Kiara Kabukuru, Georgina Grenville, Rachel Roberts, Daryl Hannah
1999	Herb Ritts*	Los Angeles	Chandra North, Sophie Dahl, Karen Elson, Michele Hicks, Carolyn Murphy, Shirley Mallmann, Laetitia Casta, Audrey Marnay, Elsa Benítez, Bridget Hall, Angela Lindvall, Alek Wek
2000	Annie Leibovitz	Rhinebeck	Laetitia Casta, Alek Wek, Jacqui Agyepong, five dancers from the Mark Morris Dance Group: Marjorie Folkman, Lauren Grant, June Omura, Mireille Radwan-Dana, Julie Worden
2001	Mario Testino	Naples	Aurélie Claudel, Rhea Durham, Gisele Bündchen, Karen Elson, Mariana Weickert, Fernanda Tavares, Angela Lindvall, Ana Cláudia Michels, Liisa Winkler, Noémie Lenoir, Frankie Rayder, Carmen Kass
2002	Peter Lindbergh	Hollywood	Amy Smart, Brittany Murphy, Julia Stiles, Rachael Leigh Cook, Erika Christensen, Selma Blair, Lauren Bush, James King, Bridget Moynahan
2003	Bruce Weber*	Campania	Sienna Rose Miller, Eva Riccobono, Heidi Klum, Mariacarla Boscono, Isabeli Fontana, Valentina Stilla, Filippa Hamilton, Alessandra Ambrosio, Jessica Miller, Rania Faslan, Karolína Kurková, Sophie Dahl, Bridget Hall, Lisa Seiffert, Yamila Díaz, Natalia Vodianova, Marcelo Boldrini
2004	Nick Knight	London	Adina Fohlin, Natalia Vodianova, Dewi Driegen, Mariacarla Boscono, Jessica Miller, Esther de Jong, Ai Tominaga, Amanda Moore, Alek Wek, Frankie Rayder, Karolína Kurková, Liberty Ross, Pollyanna McIntosh
2005	Patrick Demarchelier	Rio de Janeiro	Filippa Hamilton, Julia Stegner, Eugenia Volodina, Naomi Campbell, Isabeli Fontana, Michelle Buswell, Adriana Lima, Erin Wasson, Diana Dondoe, Liliane Ferrarezi, Marija Vujovic, Valentina Zelyaeva
2006	Mert Alas; Marcus Piggot	Côte d'Azur	Jennifer Lopez, Kate Moss, Gisele Bündchen, Natalia Vodianova, Karen Elson, Guinevere Van Seenus
2007	Inez and Vinoodh	studio set	Penélope Cruz, Sophia Loren, Lou Doillon, Hilary Swank, Naomi Watts
2008	Patrick Demarchelier*	Shanghai	Agyness Deyn, Lily Donaldson, Doutzen Kroes, Catherine McNeil, Gemma Ward, Sasha Pivovarova, Coco Rocha, Caroline Trentini, Mo Wandan, Du Juan, Maggie Cheung
2009	Peter Beard	Okavango Delta	Mariacarla Boscono, Daria Werbowy, Malgosia Bela, Rianne ten Haken, Lara Stone, Emanuela de Paula, Isabeli Fontana
2010	Terry Richardson	Trancoso, Bahia, Brazil	Catherine McNeil, Enikő Mihalik, Ana Beatriz Barros, Miranda Kerr, Rosie Huntington-Whiteley, Abbey Lee Kershaw, Daisy Lowe, Gracie Carvalho, Lily Cole, Marloes Horst, Georgina Stojiljkovic
2011	Karl Lagerfeld	Paris (studio set)	Isabeli Fontana, Heidi Mount, Bianca Balti, Lara Stone, Natasha Poly as Melpomene, Iris Strubegger as Athena, Elisa Sednaoui as Flora, Magdalena Frackowiak, Julianne Moore as Hera, Freja Beha Erichsen, Daria Werbowy, Erin Wasson as Ajax, Baptiste Giabiconi as Apollo, Brad Kroenig, Abbey Lee Kershaw, Lakshmi Menon, Garrett Neff, Jake Davies, Jeneil Williams, Anja Rubik, Sébastien Jondeau
2012	Mario Sorrenti	Domaine de Murtoli, Sartène, Corsica	Lara Stone, Kate Moss, Guinevere Van Seenus, Edita Vilkevičiūtė, Rinko Kikuchi, Milla Jovovich, Saskia de Brauw, Joan Smalls, Natasha Poly, Isabeli Fontana, Malgosia Bela, Margareth Madè
2013	Steve McCurry	Rio de Janeiro	Isabeli Fontana, Petra Nemcová, Sônia Braga, Hanaa Ben Abdesslem, Liya Kebede, Adriana Lima, Summer Rayne Oakes, Kyleigh Kühn, Marisa Monte, Karlie Kloss, Elisa Sednaoui
2014	Peter Lindbergh, Patrick Demarchelier	New York (studio set); 50th anniversary	Miranda Kerr, Alessandra Ambrosio, Helena Christensen, Isabeli Fontana, Karolína Kurková
2014	Helmut Newton	Montecarlo, Chianti	Neith Hunter, Susie Bick, Betty Prado, Antonia Dell'Atte
2015	Steven Meisel	New York City	Adriana Lima, Natalia Vodianova, Raquel Zimmermann, Isabeli Fontana, Sasha Luss, Anna Ewers, Carolyn Murphy, Cameron Russell, Gigi Hadid, Candice Huffine, Karen Elson, Joan Smalls
2016	Annie Leibovitz*	New York City, Leibovitz studio	Tavi Gevinson, Serena Williams, Amy Schumer, Yoko Ono, Fran Lebowitz, Patti Smith, Yao Chen, Natalia Vodianova, Kathleen Kennedy, Mellody Hobson, Ava DuVernay, Agnes Gund, Shirin Neshat
2017	Peter Lindbergh	Berlin, Los Angeles, New York City, London, Le Touquet	Jessica Chastain, Penélope Cruz, Nicole Kidman, Rooney Mara, Helen Mirren, Julianne Moore, Lupita Nyong'o, Charlotte Rampling, Léa Seydoux, Uma Thurman, Alicia Vikander, Kate Winslet, Robin Wright, Zhang Ziyi, Anastasia Ignatova
2018	Tim Walker	London	Whoopi Goldberg as the Royal Duchess, RuPaul as the Queen of Hearts, Lupita Nyong'o as the Dormouse, Djimon Hounsou as the King of Hearts, Puff Daddy, Naomi Campbell as Royal Beheader, Lil Yachty, Adwoa Aboah as Tweedledee, Sasha Lane as the Mad March Hare, Duckie Thot as Alice, Thando Hopa as the Princess of Hearts, Slick Woods as the Mad Hatter, Zoe Bedeaux as the Caterpillar, Alpha Dia as the card gardener, Jaha Dukureh, King Owusu as the card gardener, Wilson Oryema, Adut Akech
2019	Albert Watson	Miami, New York	Laetitia Casta as the painter and Sergei Polunin, Misty Copeland as the dancer and Calvin Royal III, Julia Garner as the photographer and Astrid Eika, Gigi Hadid as the heiress and Alexander Wang
2020	Paolo Roversi	Paris, Verona	Claire Foy • Mia Goth • Chris Lee • Indya Moore • Rosalía • Stella Roversi • Yara Shahidi • Kristen Stewart • Emma Watson
2021	no calendar		
2022	Bryan Adams	Los Angeles, Capri	Iggy Pop • Rita Ora • Cher • Grimes • Normani • Kali Uchis • Jennifer Hudson • Saweetie • St. Vincent • Bohan Phoenix
2023	Emma Summerton	New York, London	Karlie Kloss as the Tech Savant • Adut Akech as the Dream Catcher • Bella Hadid as the Sprite • Emily Ratajkowski as the Writer • Cara Delevingne as the Performer • Sasha Pivovarova as the Painter • Guinevere van Seenus as the Photographer • Ashley Graham as the Activist • Lauren Wasser as the Athlete • Kaya Wilkins as the Musician • Adwoa Aboah as the Queen • Precious Lee as the Storyteller • Lila Moss as the Seer • He Cong as the Sage
2024	Prince Gyasi	Ghana, London; 60th anniversary	Otumfuo Nana Osei Tutu II • Naomi Campbell • Margot Lee Shetterly • Angela Bassett • Amanda Gorman • Tiwa Savage • Idris Elba • Jeymes Samuel • Amoako Boafo • Teyana Taylor • Marcel Desailly
2025	Ethan James Green	Miami's Historic Virginia Key Beach Park	Simone Ashley • John Boyega • Vincent Cassel • Elodie • Connie Fleming • Hoyeon • Jodie Turner-Smith • Jenny Shimizu • Hunter Schafer • Padma Lakshmi • Martine Gutierrez • Ethan James Green

== Filmography ==
- The Pirelli Calendar Saga (2010) by Emmanuel Le Ber

== Exhibitions ==
- 2014: The Cal – Collezione Pirelli at Palazzo Reale in Milan: photos of Richard Avedon, Peter Beard, Patrick Demarchelier, Peter Lindbergh, Steve McCurry, Steven Meisel, Herb Ritts, and Bruce Weber.
- 2016: during the New York Fashion Week Fall 2016, inside Skylight at Moynihan Station: photos by Hans Feurer, Inez and Vinoodh, Peter Lindbergh, Steve McCurry, Mert and Marcus, Herb Ritts, and Bruce Weber
- 2018: 2017 Pirelli Calendar By Peter Lindbergh And More.., Multimedia Art Museum of Moscow, the Vasnetsov brothers art museum of Kirov, Kaliningrad museum of fine arts, Novosibirsk State Art Museum, Abakan picture gallery

== Books ==
- Forsyth, Derek; Tronchetti Provera, Marco (1997). Pavilion Books Ltd (ed.). Pirelli Calendar Classics. ISBN 978-1-8579-3929-3.
- Laurenzi, Laura (27 October 2000). Cartago (ed.). Best of the Pirelli Calendar 1964-2000. ISBN 978-1-9008-2632-7.
- Sartori, Christina; Tronchetti Provera, Marco (November 2004). Thames & Hudson Ltd (ed.). The Pirelli Calendar: 40 Years Complete. ISBN 978-0-5005-4297-2.
- Tomkins, Richard (31 October 2008). "Pirelli calendar comes home". Financial Times magazine. London: The Financial Times Ltd.
- Daverio, Philippe (20 August 2015). Taschen (ed.). Pirelli - The Calendar: 50 Years And More. Taschen. ISBN 978-3-8365-5175-5.
