= Maureen Cleave =

British journalist (1934–2021)

- Cleave in 1971
- Born: Maureen Diana Cleave; 20 October 1934; Mussoorie, British India
- Died: 6 November 2021 (aged 87); Aldeburgh, England
- Occupation: Journalist
- Spouse: Francis Nichols (m. 1966; died 2015)

Maureen Diana Cleave (20 October 1934 – 6 November 2021) was a British journalist. She worked for the London Evening Standard from 1958 conducting interviews with many prominent musicians of the era, including Bob Dylan and each of the Beatles. Over 50 years, she continued to interview people in all walks of life, in the Standard, the Telegraph Magazine, Observer Magazine, Saga magazine, Intelligent Life magazine, and elsewhere.

== Early life ==
Cleave was born in Mussoorie, British India, on 20 October 1934. She grew up in Ireland, her mother Isabella's country of origin with an English father, Major John Cleave, of the 7th Rajputs. Cleave attended Rosleven boarding school in Athlone and Howell’s Girls’ School in Denbigh, before reading Modern History at St Anne's College, Oxford. There, she had the distinction of being the first woman asked to speak at the Oxford Union. She graduated with third class honours in 1957.

== Career ==
After graduating, Cleave first worked as a secretary for the Evening Standard. She convinced its editor, Charles Wintour, to make her a show business correspondent and to let her write a pop music column called "Disc Date". She travelled to Liverpool to interview the Beatles in January 1963 after a tip from a friend working there. The piece, titled "Why the Beatles create all that frenzy" and published in the Evening Standard the following month, was among the first substantial critiques of the band. It established a lasting friendship between Cleave and the Beatles as they gained international success. Cleave began guesting on TV’s pop panel game Juke Box Jury in 1964 alongside Millicent Martin, Matt Monro and Bobby Vee.

In early 1966, Cleave interviewed the four Beatles and their manager Brian Epstein for a series of one-page accounts. Titled "How Does a Beatle Live?", the pieces were published in the Evening Standard from 4 March to 1 April on consecutive Fridays. Cleave's interview with Lennon quoted him as saying that the Beatles were "more popular than Jesus now". Five months later, on the eve of a 14-city US tour, an American magazine reproduced the remark, which led to a wave of anti-Beatle sentiment in many parts of the US, especially the South and Midwest.

According to the Bob Spitz biography of the Beatles, Lennon claimed a liaison with Cleave, inspiring the band's song "Norwegian Wood (This Bird Has Flown)". Pete Shotton, a friend of Lennon's, also suggested Cleave, though Cleave has said that in all her encounters with Lennon that he made "no pass" at her, and Lennon later said he could not remember who the song was about. It has also been said the woman in question was Sonny Freeman, wife of photographer Robert Freeman, who shot the photos on the covers of multiple Beatles albums, including With the Beatles, Help! and Rubber Soul. Cleave ended her association with Lennon in 1966, the same year she married.

In addition to the Beatles, Cleave interviewed Bob Dylan and the Rolling Stones during the 1960s. She favoured talking to individuals who were not celebrities and avoided actors and politicians "because they’ve said it all before". Her choice of "remarkable people" to interview included for example Guinness heiress Aileen Plunket (1983), rock star Little Richard (1985), and Donald Maclean, who was chairman of the National Vegetable Society. She later wrote a warm tribute to Lennon in The Telegraph Weekend Magazine a decade after he was murdered in December 1980.

== Personal life ==
Cleave married Francis Nichols in September 1966. They met while studying at Oxford and resided in Peru for three years during the late 1960s because of his job as an economist and farmer. After his mother's death in 1972, they relocated to his family home in Lawford Hall. They remained married until his death in 2015. Together, they had three children: Sadie, Dora and Bertie.

Cleave was diagnosed with chronic fatigue syndrome, shortly after collapsing on the platform of Tottenham Court Road tube station in August 1992. She died on 6 November 2021, two weeks after her 87th birthday. She suffered a short illness prior to her death.

== Sources ==
- Feldman-Barrett, Christine (2022). A Women's History of the Beatles. New York City: Bloomsbury Academic. ISBN 978-1-5013-4805-1 – via Google Books.
- Venturo, David (2021). "The End of the Road: The Beatles' Decision to Stop Touring". In Womack, Kenneth (ed.). The Beatles in Context. New York: Cambridge University Press. pp. 98–106. ISBN 978-1-108-40952-0.
