= List of L'Officiel China cover models =

Cover of the February 2022 issue with Jing Tian

This list of 时装 L'Officiel China cover models (1987–1990; 2002–2002; 2003–present) is a catalog of cover models who have appeared on the cover of 时装 L'Officiel China, the Chinese edition of French fashion magazine L'Officiel. From 1987 to 1990 the magazine was published as 巴黎时装 L'Officiel, and from 2002 to 2002 as 魅力 L'Officiel 中文版.

== 1980s ==
=== 1987 ===
Issue	Cover model	Photographer	Ref.
August			

=== 1988 ===
Issue	Cover model	Photographer	Ref.
March			
July			

=== 1989 ===
Issue	Cover model	Photographer	Ref.
April	Marielle Macville	Eliot Siegel	
#5	Julie Anderson	Jonathan Lennard	

== 1990s ==
=== 1990 ===
Issue	Cover model	Photographer	Ref.
September			

== 2000s ==
=== 2002 ===
Issue	Cover model	Photographer	Ref.
August	Tetyana Brazhnyk	Ben Hasset	
September	Ling Tan	Valérie Belin	
October			
November			
December	Raquel Zimmermann	Cédric Buchet	

=== 2003 ===
Issue	Cover model	Photographer	Ref.
December	Emmanuelle Béart	Anuschka Blommers & Niels Schumm	

=== 2004 ===
Issue	Cover model	Photographer	Ref.
January	Mor Katzir	Michel Mallard	
February			
March	Ksenia Maximova	Michel Mallard	
April	Carmen Maria Hillestad	David Bailey	
May			
June	Suzanne Pots		
July			
August	Ruslana Korshunova	Elina Kechicheva	
September			
October			
November			
December	Maggie Cheung		

=== 2005 ===
Issue	Cover model	Photographer	Ref.
January	Rosemary Vandenbroucke		
February			
March	Kristy Yang		
April			
May			
June			
July			
August			
September			
October			
November			
December	Diane Kruger		

=== 2006 ===
Issue	Cover model	Photographer	Ref.
January	Zhang Ziyi	Christian Kettiger	
February			
March			
April	Li Bingbing		
May	Elena Melnik		
June			
July			
August			
September	Lin Chi-ling		
October			
November			
December	Zhang Ziyi		

=== 2007 ===
Issue	Cover model	Photographer	Ref.
January	Karen Mok		
February	Aleksandra Ørbeck Nilssen	Stratis and Beva	
March			
April			
May	Michele Reis		
June	Gao Yuanyuan		
July	Anna Wang		
August			
September	Emma Pei; Anna Wang; Mo Wandan		
October	Du Juan		
November	Zhang Jingchu		
December			

=== 2008 ===
Issue	Cover model	Photographer	Ref.
January	Zhang Ziyi	Christian Kettiger	
February	Li Bingbing		
March	Diane Kruger		
April	Mo Wandan		
May	Xu Jinglei		
June	Vivian Hsu		
July	Fan Bingbing	Chen Man	
August	Sun Li		
September	Zhang Ziyi, Li Ming, Chen Hong		
October	Zhou Xun, Chen Kun		
October	Sun Li, Donnie Yen		
November	Sammi Cheng		
December	Chen Hong, Leon Lai, Wang Xueqi, Zhang Ziyi, Sun Honglei		

=== 2009 ===
Issue	Cover model	Photographer	Ref.
January	Zhang Ziyi		
February	Du Juan		
March	Aaron Kwok; Ekin Cheng; Tiffany Tang		
April	Eva Green		
May	Gao Yuanyuan		
June	Zhang Jingchu		
July			
August	Hu Jun; Sun Li; Gan Wei		
September	Michelle Reis		
October			
November	Li Bingbing		
December	Xu Jinglei		

== 2010s ==
=== 2010 ===
Issue	Cover model	Photographer	Ref.
January	Vivian Hsu		
February			
March	Zhou Xun		
April	Zhang Jingchu		
May	Gao Yuanyuan, Yao Chen, Li Xiaolu		
June	Liu Wen		
July	Emma Pei		
August			
September	Gong Li		
October			
November	Li Bingbing	Chen Man	
December	Gao Yuanyuan		

=== 2011 ===
Issue	Cover model	Photographer	Ref.
January			
February	Faye Wong		
March	Karen Mok		
April			
May			
June	Liu Yifei	Sun Jun	
July	Sun Li; Deng Chao		
August	Liu Wen		
September	Michelle Reis		
October	Gong Li	Feng Hai	
November	Li Bingbing		
December	Fan Bingbing	Chen Man	

=== 2012 ===
Issue	Cover model	Photographer	Ref.
January			
February	Lin Peng; Jay Chou		
March			
April	Zhang Ziyi		
May	Tang Wei		
June	Zhang Jingchu		
July	Gao Yuanyuan, Mark Chao		
August	Liu Yifei	Sun Jun	
September	Gong Li		
October	Shu Qi		
November	Zhou Xun		
December	Ni Ni		

=== 2013 ===
Issue	Cover model	Photographer	Ref.
January	Carina Lau		
February	Lin Chi-ling		
March	Coco Rocha	Jun Liu	
April	Cecilia Cheung	Zack Zhang	
May	Sun Li	Sun Jun	
June	Ni Ni		
July			
August	Li Bingbing	Wei Lai	
September	Gong Li	Feng Hai	
October	Fan Bingbing	Chen Man	
November	Naomi Campbell	Jun Liu	
December			

=== 2014 ===
Issue	Cover model	Photographer	Ref.
January	Zhang Yuqi		
February	Angelababy	Chen Man	
March	Jessica Stam	Jun Liu	
April	Gao Yuanyuan		
May	Ni Ni	Li Qi	
June	Fan Bingbing; Huang Xiaoming	Chen Man	
July	Cecilia Cheung	Wu Haiyong	
August	Li Yuchun	Zack Zhang	
September	Gong Li	Feng Hai	
October	Li Bingbing	Sun Jun	
November			
December	Sui He	Zack Zhang	

=== 2015 ===
Issue	Cover model	Photographer	Ref.
January	Angelababy	Chen Man	
February	Yang Mi		
March	Manon Leloup	Yu Cong	
April	Ni Ni	Trunk Xu	
May	Fan Bingbing; Han Geng	Chen Man	
June	Liu Yifei	Fan Xin	
July	Zhang Yuqi	Zack Zhang	
August	Sun Li	Mei Yuan Gui	
August	Yang Zishan	Zack Zhang	
September	Zhou Xun	Yu Cong	
September	Chen Man	Wu Ming	
October	Carina Lau	Chen Man	
November	Jing Tian	Chen Man	
December			

=== 2016 ===
Issue	Cover model	Photographer	Ref.
January	Jennifer Lawrence	Jean-Baptiste Mondino	
February	Bai Baihe	Yu Cong	
March	Ni Ni	Sun Jun	
April	Angelababy	Chen Man	
May	Tiffany Tang		
June	Yang Mi		
July	Fan Bingbing	Liu Zongyuan	
August	Liu Shishi	Liu Zongyuan	
September	Li Yuchun	Trunk Xu	
October	Li Bingbing	Sun Jun	
November	Yang Yang	Wei Lai	
November	Leo Wu	Wu Haiyong	
November	Ouyang Nana	Jin Jiaji	
December	Yang Mi, Jing Tian & Timmy Xu		

=== 2017 ===
Issue	Cover model	Photographer	Ref.
January	Zhang Yuqi	Zack Zhang	
February	Victoria Song	Liu Zongyuan	
February	Fan Bingbing; Li Chen	Chen Man	
March	Liu Yifei	Liu Zongyuan	
April	Ni Ni	Yu Cong	
May	Song Jia		
June	Jessie Li		
July	Liu Tao		
August	Liu Shishi	Liu Zongyuan	
September	Angelababy	Liu Zongyuan	
October			
November	Qiao Xin	Michelle Du Xuan	
November	Jing Tian	Liu Zongyuan	
November	Fan Bingbing	Patrick Demarchelier	
November	Dilraba Dilmurat	Wei Lai	
December	Gülnezer Bextiyar	Zack Zhang	
December	Victoria Song	Yu Cong	

=== 2018 ===
Issue	Cover model	Photographer	Ref.
January	Yang Mi	Mei Yuan Gui	
February	Vin Zhang	Jin Jiaji	
February	Li Bingbing	Chen Man	
March			
April	Liu Shishi	Liu Zongyuan	
April	Timmy Xu	Yin Chao	
May	Tiffany Tang	Shao Di	
May	Jiang Shuying	Wei Lai	
June	Li Qin	Liu Zongyuan	
June	Tong Liya	Wang Longwei	
July	Gülnezer Bextiyar	Zack Zhang	
July	Ma Sichun	Luo Yang	
July	Yang Caiyu	Michelle Du Xuan	
August	Jackson Yee	Wang Ziqian	
August	Zhang Tian'ai	Wei Lai	
August	Hai Qing	Liu Zongyuan	
September	Tang Yixin	Wei Lai	
September	Ni Ni	Chen Man	
October	Wang Ziwen	Wei Lai	
October	Jing Tian	Yin Chao	
October	Huang Jingyu	Primol Xue	
November	Zhong Chuxi	Charles Guo	
November	Turbo Liu	Zeng Wu	
December	Li Yuchun	Chen Man	
December	Jolin Tsai	Alex C	

=== 2019 ===
Issue	Cover model	Photographer	Ref.
January	Wang Junkai	Zack Zhang	
January	Dilraba Dilmurat	Wei Lai	
February	Jiang Shuying	Wei Lai	
February	Chen Man	Liu Song	
March			
April	Ming Xi	Zack Zhang	
April	Zhang Tian'ai	Wei Lai	
May	Ni Ni	Michelle Du Xuan	
June	Zhu Yilong	Yu Cong	
June	Song Zu'er	Mei Yuan Gui	
July	Zhou Dongyu; Wu Haiyan	Wang Ziqian	
July	Tiffany Tang	Shao Di	
July	Wu Xuanyi	Wei Lai	
August	Victoria Song		
August	Gülnezer Bextiyar		
August	Wu Xuanyi	Luo Yang	
September	Li Yuchun	Zeng Wu	
October	Wang Ziwen	Wei Lai	
October	Cai Xukun	Jumbo Tsui	
October	Huang Jingyu; Wang Likun	Shi Shaoyuan	
November	Yao Chen	Li Qi	
November	Du Jiang	Wei Lai	
December	Jackson Yee	Charles Guo	
December	Li Qin	Zhong Lin	
December	Yang Mi	Li Qi	

== 2020s ==
=== 2020 ===
Issue	Cover model	Photographer	Ref.
January	Wang Junkai	Chen Man	
January	Jing Tian	Kai Z. Feng	
February	Dilraba Dilmurat	Wei Lai	
March	Roy Wang	Yu Cong	
April/May	Liu Shishi	Wang Ziqian	
April/May	Cai Xukun	Charles Guo	
June	Lu Han	Charles Guo	
June	Ni Ni	Fan Xin	
July	Gülnezer Bextiyar	Xie Xiaotian	
July	Wang Ziwen	Wei Lai	
August	Ouyang Nana	Yu Cong	
August	Leo Wu	Michelle Du Xuan	
September	Angelababy	Chen Man	
September	Zhu Yilong	Sun Jun	
September	Chu Wong	Zeng Wu	
October	Liu Yuxin	Guo Haowen	
November	Li Yuchun	Li Xiaoliang	
December	Zhao Liying	Sun Jun	
December	Jackson Yee	Zeng Wu	

=== 2021 ===
Issue	Cover model	Photographer	Ref.
January	Yang Mi	Chen Man	
January	Wang Junkai	Zack Zhang	
February	Jiang Shuying	Li Xiaoliang	
February	Jenny Zhang	Zack Zhang	
March	Angelababy	Nick Yang	
March	Lay Zhang	Zack Zhang	
April	Victoria Song	Yu Cong	
April	Deng Lun	Zack Zhang	
May	Sui He		
May	Gülnezer Bextiyar	Zack Zhang	
May	Liu Shishi	Oliver June	
June	Ni Ni	Sun Jun	
July	Liu Haocun	He Kai Tuo Yi	
July	Yang Chaoyue	Wang Lei and Jiang Kun	
July	Jing Boran	Kai Z. Feng	
August	Jing Tian	Yin Chao	
August	Wang Ziwen	Wei Lai	
September	Lu Han		
September	Jessica Chastain	Alexi Lubomirski	
October	Zhao Liying	Chen Man	
October	Yang Yang	Nick Yang	
November	Dilraba Dilmurat	Wei Lai	
November	Fan Chengcheng	Chen Man	
December	Tang Yixin	Eric Tsui	
December	Zhang Tian'ai	Wei Lai	

=== 2022 ===
Issue	Cover model	Photographer	Ref.
January	Yang Mi	Zack Zhang	
February	Jing Tian	Liu Zongyuan	
February	Liu Yu	Jiang Nan	
February	Yao Chen	Nick Yang	
March	Liu Yuxin	Li Xiaoliang	
April	Zhang Xiaofei	Yin Chao	
April	Eileen Gu	Liu Zongyuan	
May	Gina Jin	Wei Lai	
June	Sui He	Fan Xin	
June	Gong Jun	Zack Zhang	
July	Jiali Zhao	Lan Tian Sky	
August	Hai Qing	Jumbo Tsui	
August	Jessica Jung	Oliver June	
August	Tang Yixin	Eric Tsui	
September	Ni Ni	Charles Guo	
September	Chen Xiao	Xiaogang	
October	Lu Han	Win Tam	
October	Zhao Liying	Jiang Nan	
November	Tiffany Tang	Liu Zongyuan	
December	Angelababy	Yu Cong	
December	Song Jia	Oliver June	
December	Dylan Wang	Oliver June	

=== 2023 ===
Issue	Cover model	Photographer	Ref.
January	Luo Yunxi	YoonChong Xu	
January	Yang Mi	Wei Lai	
February	Cheng Yi	YoonChong Xu	
February	Yin Tao	Sun Jun	
March	Li Xian	Nick Yang	
March	Dilraba Dilmurat	Zeng Wu	
April	Liu Yu	YoonChong Xu	
April	Gülnezer Bextiyar	YoonChong Xu	
April	Song Zu'er	Wei Lai	
May	Vicky Chen	Jiang Nan	
May	Tong Liya	Yin Chao	
June	Gong Jun	Jiang Nan	
June	Liu Yuxin	YoonChong Xu	
July	Fan Chengcheng	YoonChong Xu	
July	Gina Jin	Win Tam	
July	Liu Shishi	Sun Jun	
August	Yang Caiyu	Michelle Du Xuan	
August	Ren Jialun	Xiaogang	
August	Zhang Tian'ai	Tu Songze	
August	Janice Man	Michelle Du Xuan	
September	Ni Ni	Tu Songze	
September	Jay Chou	Paul Zhang	
October	Chang Chen	Chen Man	
October	Li Bingbing	Chen Man	
November	Wang Ziwen	Michelle Du Xuan	
November	Zhao Lusi	YoonChong Xu	
December	Victoria Song	Oliver June	
December	Anna Wang	YoonChong Xu	
December	Bai Jingting	Liu Song	

=== 2024 ===
Issue	Cover model	Photographer	Ref.
January	Lay Zhang	Xiaogang	
January	Tiffany Tang	Liu Zongyuan	
February	Zhang Hao	Wu Haiyong	
February	Xin Zhilei	Leslie Zhang	
February	Qin Lan	Xiaogang	
March	Dilraba Dilmurat	Zeng Wu	
March	He Cong	Zeng Wu	
March	Deng Wei	Fan Xin	
April	Vicky Chen	Zuo Shutong	
April	Greg Hsu	Chen Man	
April	Ai Tominaga	York Haiyang	
May	Jason Zhang	Li Xiaoliang	
May	Sijia Kang	Ren Shenyun	
June	Li Yuchun	Tu Songze	
June	Yang Yang	Win Tam	
July	Karen Mok	Jumbo Tsui	
July	Li Qin	Zeng Wu	
July	Ren Jialun	Xiaogang	
July	Bai Lu	Michelle Du Xuan	
August	Chen Meng; Ge Manqi; Huang Yaqiong; Sun Yiwen; Zhang Yufei	Zack Zhang Zhao Cheng	
August	Hello Kitty		
September	Carina Lau	Tu Songze	
October	Yang Mi	Leslie Zhang	
October	Nicole Kidman	Matthew Brookes	
October	Ni Ni	Liu Zongyuan	
October	Li Wen	Kuang Ye	
November	Yang Zi	Edwin Zhang	
November	Gina Jin	YoonChong Xu	
November	Yang Caiyu	Leslie Zhang	
November	Gong Jun	Jiang Nan	
December	Liu Shishi	Liu Zongyuan	
December	Liu Yuxin	Zuo Shutong	
December	Gülnezer Bextiyar	Xiaogang	

=== 2025 ===
Issue	Cover model	Photographer	Ref.
January	Xin Zhilei	Tu Songze	
January	Ju Jingyi	Tu Songze	
January	Yang Mi	Song Wanjie	
January	Ding Yuxi	Sun Jun	
February	Ning Chang	Oliver June	
February	Huang Yaqiong; Liu Yuchen	Jiang Nan	
February	Isabelle Huppert	Michelle Du Xuan	
Special issue	Tao Xinran; Ying Er; Ziyan Yang	Lu Zai	
March	Dilraba Dilmurat	Zeng Wu	
April	Li Yunxiao	Greg Lin Jiajie	
April	Yuqi	Win Tam	
April	Zeng Shunxi	Leslie Zhang	
May	Chen Duling	He Kai Tuo Yi	
May	Mika Hashizume	XIA	
May	Jiali Zhao	Li Hui	
June	Zhao Jinmai	Oliver June	
June	Tiffany Tang	Zeng Wu	
July	Zhong Chuxi	Zeng Wu	
July	Meng Ziyi	Edwin Zhang	
July	Jackson Wang	Rob Rusling	
August	Bai Lu	Jiang Nan	
August	Tian Xiwei	Leslie Zhang	
August	Lars Huang	Xiaozhi	
August	Yao Chen	Liu Zongyuan	
September	Jolin Tsai	Zeng Wu	
September	Jason Zhang	Tu Songze	
September	Chace (Yihan Zhu)	Kuang Ye	
September	Enli	Kuang Ye	
September	Mola Oddity	Kuang Ye	
September	Yang Yingge (David Yang)	Kuang Ye	
September	Cheng Yi	Jumbo Tsui	
October	Deva Cassel	Michelle Du Xuan	
October	Du Juan	Sun Jun	
November	Sehun	Kim Yeongjun	
November	Wu Jinyan	Jiang Nan	
December	Ni Ni	Michelle Du Xuan	
December	SMTR25	Wonyoung Ki	

=== 2026 ===
Issue	Cover model	Photographer	Ref.
January	Gao Yuanyuan	Wang Lei and Jiang Kun	
February	Li Yun Xiao	Kuang Ye	
February	Zhang Tian'ai	Matthew	
March	Li Bingbing	Wang Lei and Jiang Kun	
April	Xin Liu	Ran Shenyun	
April	Johnny Huang	Lavies	
May	Vicky Chen	Wang Ziqian	
May	Li Qin	Reven Lei	
May	Hou Minghao	Xiaozhi	
May	Ouyang Nana	Xu Chuang	
May	Shen Yue	Mengzhi	
June	Cecilia Cheung	Zuo Shutong (左舒同)	
June	Yang Liping	Xiaozhi	
June	Xie Xin	Kuang Ye	
July	Tiffany Tang	Liu Zongyuan	
August	Ning Chang	Liu Zongyuan	
August	Liu Yu	Yongcong Hsu	
September	Ni Ni	Xu Chuang	
October	Dilraba Dilmurat	Wang Lei and Jiang Kun	
November	Zhang Chi	Xiaozhi	
November	Yang Yang	Oliver June	
November	Zhu Zhu	Wang Longwei	

== See also ==
- List of Vogue China cover models
