= Stojilković =

Stojilković is a surname. People with the surname include:

- Filip Stojilković (born 2000), Swiss footballer
- Momir Stojilković (born 1961), Serbian politician

== See also ==
- Stojiljković
- Stoiljković
