= Stojiljković =

Stojiljković (Serbian Cyrillic: Cтojиљкoвић, pronounced [stojǐːʎkoʋitɕ]) is a Serbian surname that may refer to

- Aleksandar Stojiljković (born 1990), Serbian football midfielder
- Georgina Stojiljković (born 1988), Serbian fashion model
- Goran Stojiljković (disambiguation), multiple people
- Nikola Stojiljković (born 1992), Serbian football striker
- Vlajko Stojiljković (1937–2002), Yugoslavia's Minister of Internal Affairs
- Vlastimir Đuza Stojiljković (1929–2015), Serbian actor and singer
- Georgina Stojiljković (born 1988), Serbian fashion model
