= Peter Biziou =

British cinematographer (born 1944)

- Born: 8 August 1944 (age 81); Bangor, Gwynedd, Wales
- Occupation: Cinematographer
- Years active: 1965–2005

Peter Biziou (born August 8, 1944) is a retired British cinematographer.

== Early life and career ==
Born in Bangor, North Wales, Biziou was the son of special effects cameraman and cinematographer Leon Bijou, best known for shooting Foxes (1980).

Biziou began his career in the mid-1960s, where he worked on short films by Norman J. Warren and Robert Freeman. In 1973, he began his collaboration with director Alan Parker, shooting the short films Footsteps (1974) and Our Cissy (1976), before working on his feature film Bugsy Malone along with Michael Seresin.

He received the Academy Award and BAFTA Award for Best Cinematography for Mississippi Burning (1988), as well as another BAFTA nomination for The Truman Show (1998).

After retiring, Biziou moved to the southwest France.

== Filmography ==
Short film

Year	Title	Director	Notes
1965	Fragment	Norman J. Warren	Interior photography
1968	Mini-midi	Robert Freeman	Documentary short
1974	Footsteps	Alan Parker	
1974	Our Cissy	Alan Parker	
1976	Short Ends	Ester Anderson	
1983	The Bloody Chamber	Nick Lewin	

Feature film

Year	Title	Director	Notes
1969	Secret World	Paul Feyder; Robert Freeman	
1976	Bugsy Malone	Alan Parker	With Michael Seresin
1979	Monty Python's Life of Brian	Terry Jones	
1981	Time Bandits	Terry Gilliam	
1982	Pink Floyd – The Wall	Alan Parker	
1984	Another Country	Marek Kanievska	
1986	9½ Weeks	Adrian Lyne	
1988	A World Apart	Chris Menges	
1988	Mississippi Burning	Alan Parker	
1990	Rosencrantz & Guildenstern Are Dead	Tom Stoppard	
1992	City of Joy	Roland Joffé	
1992	Damage	Louis Malle	
1993	In the Name of the Father	Jim Sheridan	
1994	The Road to Wellville	Alan Parker	
1995	Richard III	Richard Loncraine	
1998	The Truman Show	Peter Weir	
2002	Unfaithful	Adrian Lyne	
2004	Ladies in Lavender	Charles Dance	
2005	Derailed	Mikael Håfström	

Documentary film

Year	Title	Director	Note
2003	Festival Express	Bob Smeaton	With Robert Fiore

== Awards and nominations ==
Year	Award	Category	Title	Result	Ref.
1988	Academy Awards	Best Cinematography	Mississippi Burning	Won	
1988	American Society of Cinematographers	Outstanding Achievement in Cinematography	Mississippi Burning	Nominated	
1988	BAFTA Awards	Best Cinematography	Mississippi Burning	Won	
1998	BAFTA Awards	Best Cinematography	The Truman Show	Nominated	
