= Uwe Ommer =

German photographer (born 1943)

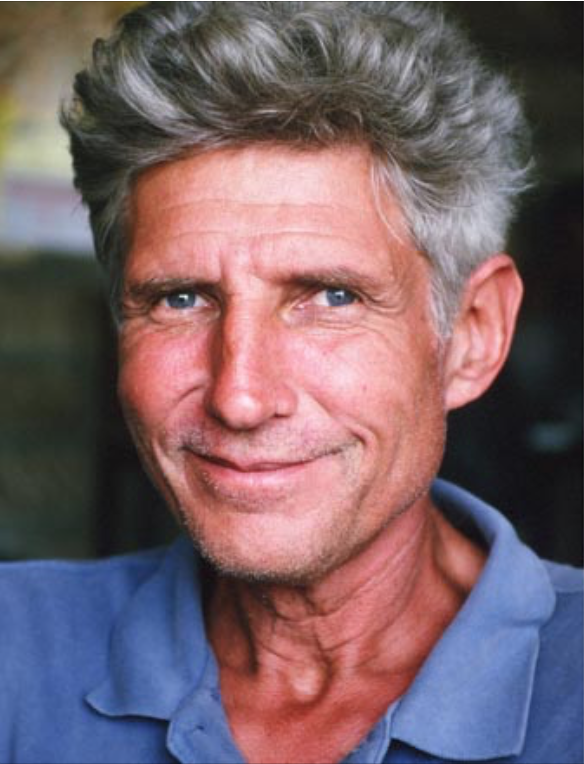

Uwe Ommer (born 1943 in Bergisch Gladbach) is a German photographer.

== Published works ==
- Photedition 2. Verlag Photographie, Schaffhausen 1980, ISBN 3-7231-1000-2.
- Exotic. Bahia Verlag, München 1983, ISBN 3-922699-24-3.
- Pirelli Calendar. 1984.
- Black ladies. Taco, Berlin 1987, ISBN 3-89268-032-9.
- Erotic Photographs. Taco, Berlin 1988, ISBN 3-89268-044-2.
- Uwe Ommer. Benedikt Taschen Verlag, Berlin 1990, ISBN 3-89450-064-6.
- Noumia. Vents d'Ouest, Issy-les-Moulineaux 1994, ISBN 2-86967-309-4.
- Black ladies. Taschen, Cologne 1995, ISBN 3-8228-8674-2.
- Asian ladies. Taschen, Cologne 2000, ISBN 3-8228-7181-8.
- 1000 Families: das Familienalbum des Planeten Erde. Taschen, Cologne 2002, ISBN 3-8228-2264-7.
- Transit : in 1424 Tagen um die Welt. Taschen, Cologne 2006, ISBN 978-3-8228-4653-7.
- Do It Yourself, with Renaud Marchand. Taschen, Cologne 2007, ISBN 3-8228-5628-2.

== Bibliography ==
- Reinhold Mißelbeck (editor): Prestel-Lexikon der Fotografen : von den Anfängen 1839 bis zur Gegenwart. Prestel, Munich 2002, ISBN 3-7913-2529-9.
