= Annie Morton =

American model (born 1970)

Annie Morton (born October 8, 1970) is an American model born in Pennsylvania. She has appeared on the covers of British Vogue, ID, Marie Claire, and other magazines. She has been photographed by Helmut Newton; Peter Lindbergh; Annie Leibovitz; Richard Avedon; Juergen Teller; Paul Jasmin, Mary Ellen Mark, Stephen Shames, and Terry Richardson, and modeled for Donna Karan, Givenchy, Guerlain, Chanel, Harper's Bazaar, Sports Illustrated and Victoria's Secret. A long time vegetarian, an advocate for organic lifestyle choices and natural healthcare. She co-founded Tsi-La Organics, a "Green Luxury" company that creates and sells vegan, organic perfume and skin care products.

== Modeling ==
She has appeared on many magazine covers and has been featured in several professional photobooks, Peter Lindbergh Selected Work, the cover of Juergen Teller By Juergen Teller, Helmut Newton Pages From The Glossies, and Donna Karan's book A Journey Of A Woman 20 Years. In 1997 she posed for the Pirelli Calendar with Richard Avedon.

Morton has also appeared in several music videos. Death in Vegas' "Aisha" directed by Terry Richardson and The Rolling Stones' "Love So Strong" directed by David Fincher.

== Other business ventures ==
Morton Co-founded Tsi-La Organics with her sister-in-law Natalie Morton in 2006. Tsi-La Organics, an award-winning "Green Luxury" company that creates and sells vegan, organic perfume and skin care products.

Natalie and Annie created their "Green Luxury" Tsi~La product line as a supposedly healthy alternative to a predominantly synthetic market.

Morton and her husband Michael Morpurgo of Dandelion own 2 School of Rock music schools (Doylestown, Pa and Princeton, NJ).

== Animal activist ==
Morton is a supporter of animal rights causes and a board member of Lulu's Rescue. Lulu's Rescue is an all-volunteer companion animal rescue group.

== Personal life ==
Morton and her husband Michael Morpurgo of Dandelion live in Pennsylvania.
