= Liisa Winkler =

Canadian fashion model

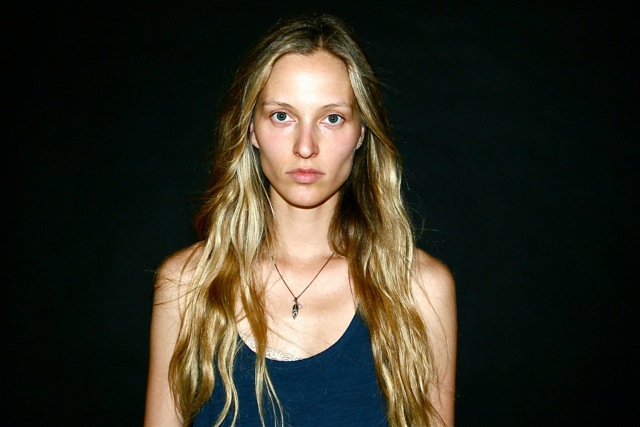
- Occupation: Fashion Model
- Spouse: Ryan Boorne
- Modeling information
- Height: 1.80 m (5 ft 11 in)
- Hair color: Blonde
- Eye color: Green

Liisa Winkler is a Canadian fashion model.

== Personal life ==
Winkler was raised in Belleville, Ontario, Canada where she was a student at the Quinte Ballet School of Canada. She is married to Ryan Boorne; they have two children together.

Winkler has been known to support and work with foundations such as the David Suzuki Foundation which works to protect and conserve nature & the environment, World Animal Protection for which she is an Ambassador, and Farm Sanctuary, an organization which works to protect farm animals from cruelty and promotes compassionate vegan living.

== Career ==
Winkler was discovered by Mode Elle Owner / Agent Audra Anderson while she was back to school shopping with her mother and best friend at age 15. Liisa then attended the Canadian Model and Talent Convention where she caught the eye of international agents and scouts.

Winkler became the Gucci "It" Girl, landing three consecutive contracts in 1999 & 2000. Winkler has since then appeared on the runway and in campaigns for designers such as Gucci, Calvin Klein, Zac Posen, Ralph Lauren, Valentino, Donna Karan, Balenciaga, Dolce & Gabbana, Celine, Escad, Marchesa, Michael Kors, Versace, Armani, BCBG, MaxMara as well as in numerous advertising campaigns including Guerlain Paris, The Gap & Ugg Australia. Winkler has appeared on the covers and in fashion magazines such as Italian, Spanish, Australian & British Vogue, Harper’s Bazaar, ELLE, Marie Claire, Allure, Glamour, Numéro, V, Flare & Fashion magazine and also appeared in the 2001 Pirelli Calendar shot by Mario Testino. She was a student at Centennial Secondary School, Belleville.

Winkler landed an exclusive with Balenciaga, appearing on the runway for their Fall / Winter 2011 collection alongside Miranda Kerr, Liya Kebede & Stella Tennant as well as in the Fall / Winter 2011 print campaign which was shot by photographer Steven Meisel.

Today, Winkler frequently appears for designers such as Victoria Beckham, Ralph Lauren, Michael Kors, and Mary Kate and Ashley Olsen's The Row.
