= Secret World (film) =

1969 film by Robert Freeman

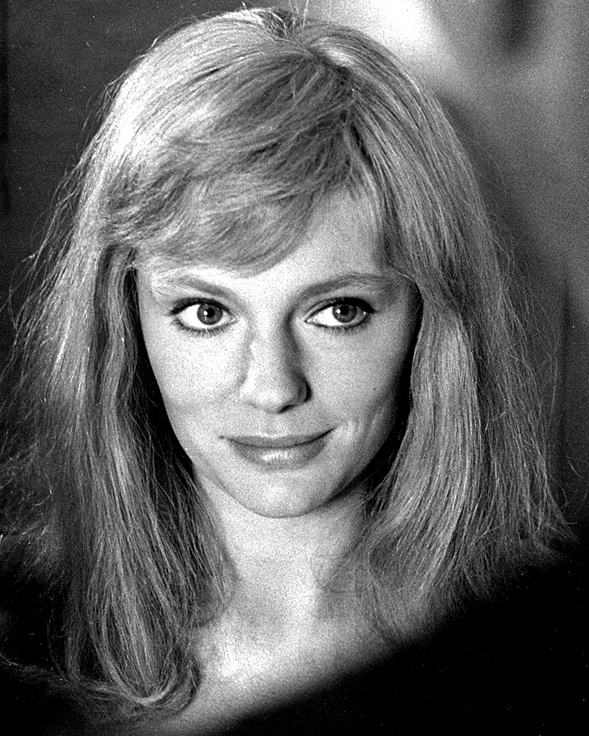
- Jacqueline Bisset in Secret World
- Directed by: Robert Freeman
- Screenplay by: Gérard Brach; Jacky Glass
- Produced by: Jacques-Eric Strauss
- Starring: Jacqueline Bisset
- Cinematography: Peter Biziou (photography)
- Edited by: Richard Bryan; Elyane Vuillermoz
- Music by: Antoine Duhamel
- Color process: Color by DeLuxe
- Production companies: Les Films du Siècle; Les Productions Fox Europa
- Distributed by: 20th Century Fox
- Release date: 10 July 1969 (France)
- Running time: 94 minutes
- Country: France
- Language: French

Secret World is a 1969 French drama film starring Jacqueline Bisset. It was directed by Robert Freeman.

It was originally known as La Promesse'.

== Plot ==
François, withdrawn and fearful of riding in cars as a result of an automobile crash that left him an orphan, lives with his middle-aged aunt and uncle, Florence and Philippe, in a chateau in Provence.

== Cast ==
- Jacqueline Bisset as Wendy
- Jean-François Vlerick as François (as Jean-François Maurin)
- Gisèle Pascal as Florence
- Pierre Zimmer as Philip / François' uncle
- Marc Porel as Olivier / Philippe's son
- Paul Bonifas as Gustave / servant
- Chantal Goya as Monique
- Guy d'Avout as Malerar

== Box office ==
According to Fox records the film required $2,300,000 in rentals to break even and by 11 December 1970 had made $900,000, so made a loss to the studio.

== See also ==
- List of French films of 1969
