= Marloes Horst =

Dutch fashion model (born 1989)

- Born: 8 March 1989 (age 37); Akkrum, Friesland, Netherlands
- Spouse: Nick Eimers (partner)
- Children: 1
- Modeling information
- Hair color: Blonde
- Eye color: Blue
- Agency: Next Model Management (worldwide)

Marloes Horst is a Dutch fashion model.

== Career ==
Horst started her career with IMG Models before switching to Next Management in 2009. She then debuted walking for Prada and appearing in a fragrance campaign for Valentino. After having struggles in London and Paris, Horst moved to New York City. In 2010, she appeared in the Pirelli calendar photographed by Terry Richardson. She also walked for Chanel that year.

In 2014, Horst appeared as a rookie in the Sports Illustrated Swimsuit Issue in which her photoshoot took place in Madagascar.

Horst has appeared in advertisements for Adidas, Calvin Klein, Diesel, H&M, Joe Fresh, Carolina Herrera, DKNY and Donna Karan, Nine West, Emporio Armani, Levi's, Stella McCartney, Ralph Lauren, Kenzo, and Tommy Hilfiger among others. Horst has been a Maybelline spokesmodel.

== Personal life ==
Horst has one son with her partner Nick Eimers.
