= Bohan Phoenix =

Chinese-American rapper

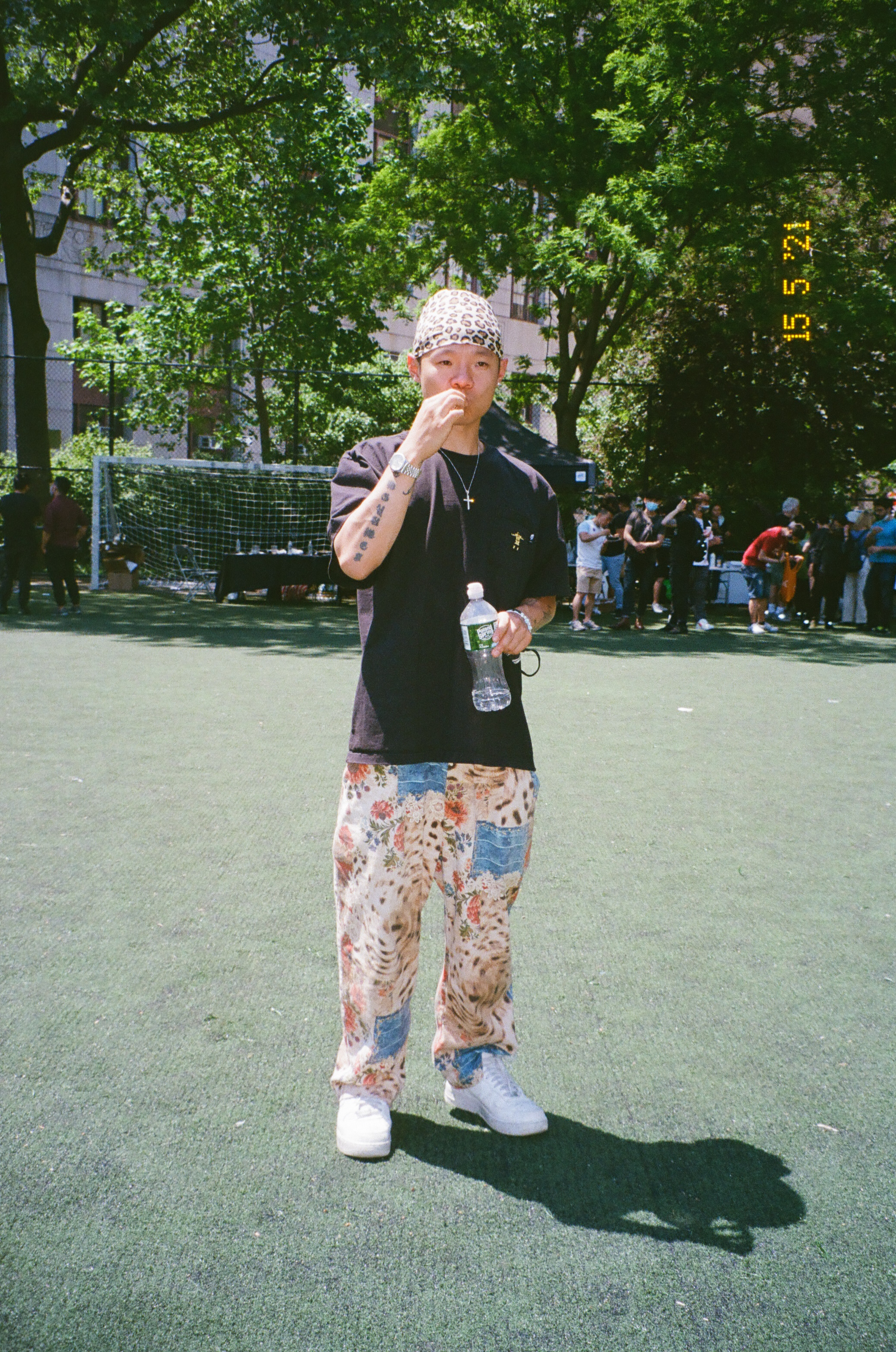
Bohan Phoenix in 2021 in Chinatown, Manhattan.

Leng Bohan (born 1991 or 1992), better known by his stage name Bohan Phoenix, is a Chinese-American rapper.

== Early life ==
Leng was born in Hubei, China, in 1991 or 1992. His mother worked in Shenzhen, and his grandparents took care of him. Leng at the age of 11 immigrated with his mother to Newton, Massachusetts, where he heard hip hop for the first time. In high school, he joined the choir, where the director encouraged him to rap. Leng studied at New York University.

== Career ==
In 2017, having lived in New York for seven years, he moved back to China after learning there was a strong desire for live hip hop music while going on tour. He released a short film detailing his reasons for returning to Chengdu in China called 3 Days in Chengdu produced by Roni Shao. After the Chinese rap competition show The Rap of China popularized hip hop in China, Leng experienced a huge increase in performance invitations, earning him enough funds to remain financially secure living in China. The show's producers asked him to compete on its first two seasons. Wary of how the show would edit his appearances, he declined to join the competition. A November 2021 article said that he was based in New York and had spent the last half decade traveling between New York and China to do shows.

To show his support for Black Lives Matter, he published the song "Unconditional" in September 2021 as part of EMPIRE Presents: Voices For Change: Vol. 1. Around 2021, he signed with Warner Music China's hip hop label JUUICE and planned to publish an album in 2022 that he had begun creating in 2018. The 2022 Pirelli Calendar included Leng, making him the "first Chinese musician" showcased in the trade calendar.

== Artistry ==
Leng's music fuses together Chinese and Western elements through singing in Mandarin and English as well as combining hip hop rhythms with Asian instruments. Olivia Wycech of MixMag said, Leng's work demonstrates a "syncopated harmony of the two transnational cultures he grew up in: rapid fire lyrics riffing in English and Mandarin with stories centred around his cultural identity and experiences as an immigrant — altogether challenging western stereotypes about hip hop".

He cites American rapper Eminem as his inspiration. Leng was captivated by Eminem's film debut 8 Mile, saying in an interview, he was "impressed by how Eminem was able to stand out, especially in an all-black environment back then. He is the gateway for so many people."
