= Goran Stojiljković =

Goran Stojiljković may refer to:

- Goran Stojiljković (footballer) (born 1970), Serbian retired footballer
- Goran Stojiljković (runner) (born 1979), Montenegrin marathon runner
