= Chen Man =

Chinese visual artist

- 陈漫
- Born: 3 June 1980 (age 45); Beijing, China
- Education: Central Academy of Fine Arts
- Known for: Visual Artist photographer Creative Director
- Website: chenmaner.com

Chen Man (simplified Chinese: 陈漫; traditional Chinese: 陳漫; born 1980) is a Chinese visual artist. Her medium includes photography, graphic design, cinematography, and digital art.

She also produces covers for fashion magazines and collaborates with major brands worldwide.

== Biography ==
Born in Beijing in 1980, Chen Man grew up after the Cultural Revolution and was part of the generation of the Chinese one-child policy. Chen attended the Central Academy of Fine Arts and graduated in 2005, where she studied graphic design.

At the age of 23, she published her self-styled photography as covers for Chinese art magazine VISION, bringing her immediate prominence for the first time as a student. Her early style includes extensive use of digital tools such as Photoshop and 3D Max to create an extravagant visual experience.

Man is also known for her hyper-realistic pop portraits like her 2012 "Whatever the Weather" covers. The series features an unsigned model and Tibetan teenagers from the Tibetan High School, an ethnic college. Man wanted to capture the "50 to 60 ethnic groups" that represent the beauty in China in her 12 photograph series for i-D. The issue was praised as both creative and forward thinking especially for her age.

Not only has Man mastered cameras and computers, she has also mastered the seamless blend of her modern aesthetics with traditional Chinese culture into her work. This has led to people praising Man for assisting the evolution of China's aesthetics and redefining Chinese beauty.

To Man there are two ways of defining beauty and she finds "both sides of the coin beautiful. She believes in genuine beauty, "what feels real whether it's an emotion, an image, a person or an artwork" and technological beauty, like the beauty of phones and computers. With the tendency to look abroad for inspiration, Man is hoping that her work will encourage people to rethink beauty and start looking "to China for inspiration."

== Career ==
In addition to producing covers for VISION magazine, Chen also does fashion photography for Vogue, Elle, Harper's Bazaar, Marie Claire, i-D, Cosmopolitan, and Esquire.

She frequently works with makeup artist Toni Lee.

Her own studio, Studio 6, based in Beijing, is producing advertising campaigns for brands such as L'Oréal, MAC, Dior, Canon, Guess, Hublot, Carl F. Bucherer, Sharp, Beats, Cadillac, Mercedes-Benz, Volkswagen, Motorola, Adidas, Puma, Converse, Uniqlo, Budweiser, Absolut Vodka, Shiseido, Maybelline etc.

== Personal life ==
Chen Man is married to American-born Raphael Ming Cooper, cofounder of Society Skateboards. She has two children.

== Selected exhibitions ==
Chen's work has been widely exhibited:

- 2004: Out of the Window Space of Distraction, Tokyo
- 2005: Fashion and style in photography, Moscow
- 2006: Wave Chinese media Art, 1997–2004, Walker Art Center, Minneapolis
- 2007: Galerie Loft, Paris
- 2008: Galerie Maeght, Paris
- 2008: China Design, Victoria and Albert Museum, London
- 2010: Red Beauty, Fabien Fryns Fine Art, Los Angeles
- 2010: Unbearable Beauty, Ooi Botos Gallery, Hong Kong
- 2011: Today Art Museum, Beijing
- 2012: Chinese Art Centre, Manchester, UK
- 2012: Glamorous Futurist by Chen Man Exhibition, Diesel Art Gallery, Tokyo
- 2013: Artist Special Project, Como Hotel, Bangkok
- 2013: Proud of Dignity 2012, Lady Dior Exhibition, Paris
- 2013: Galerie Steph+Four Season Hotel Exhibition, Four Season Hotel, Singapore
- 2014: A New Attitude: Chen Man's Provocative Interpretations of Contemporary Chinese Women Exhibition, RedLine Art Center, Denver
