= Stoiljković =

Stoiljković (Serbian Cyrillic: Cтoиљкoвић, pronounced [stoǐːʎkoʋitɕ]) is a Serbian surname that may refer to:

- Dušan Stoiljković (born 1994), Serbian football player
- Dušan Stoiljković (investor) (born 1969), Swedish entrepreneur and investor
- Jovana Stoiljković (born 1988), Serbian handball player
