= Justice Mukheli =

Visual Artist

- Born: Soweto, South Africa
- Known for: Visual Art, Photography, Filmmaking

Justice Mukheli (born in Soweto) is a South African filmmaker, photographer, and creative entrepreneur. He is known for creating art or film that centers on the African experience.

== Career ==
Justice shot a commercial for Ballantines in 2021 around their campaign Stay True: There’s No Wrong Way. Justice Mukheli was featured at the 4th edition of the Also Known As Africa contemporary art fair in Paris in 2019 as a photographer.
