= Georgina Stojiljković =

Serbian fashion model (born 1988)

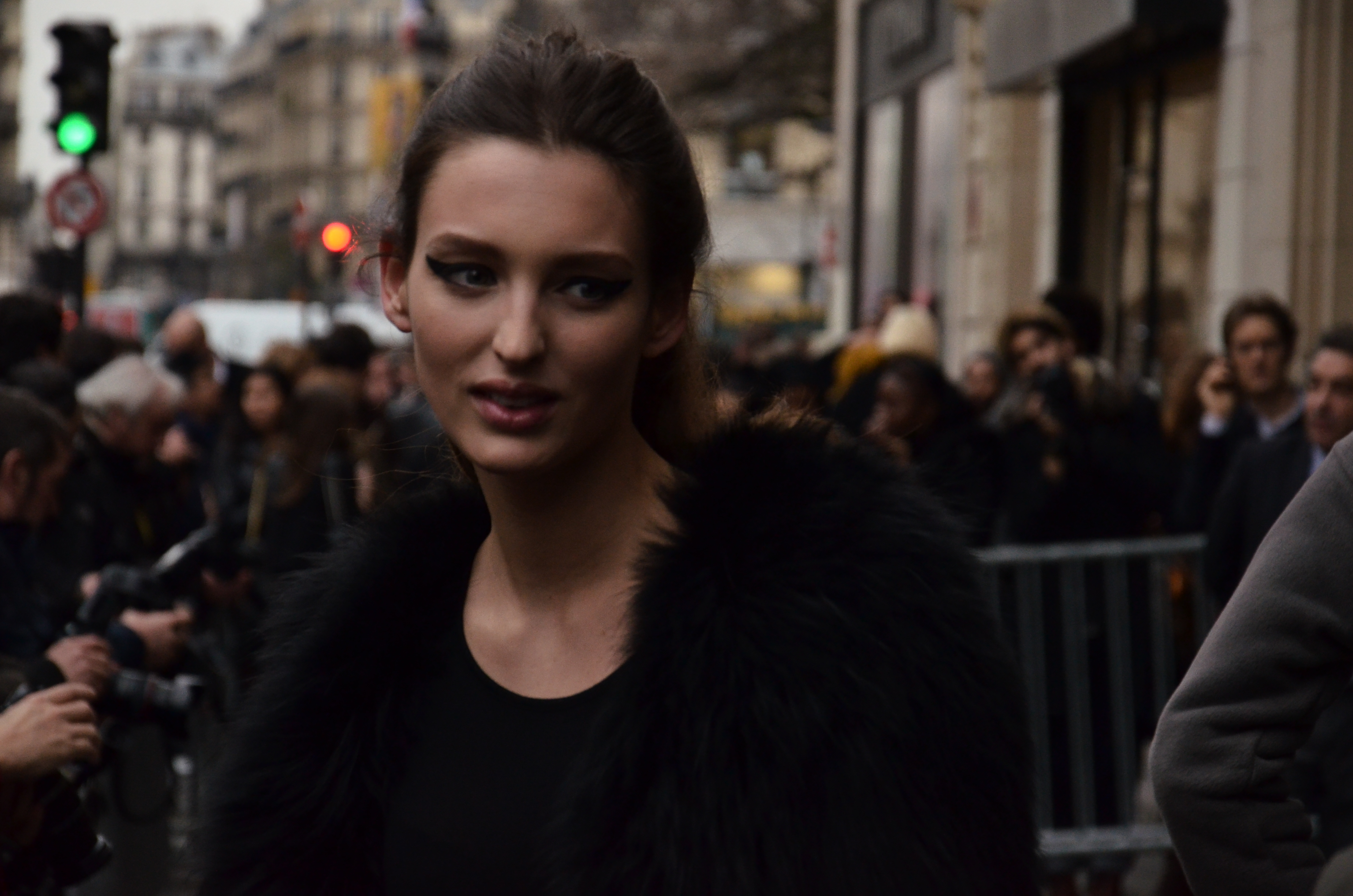
- Stojiljković in 2012
- Born: Đurđa Stojiljković; May 19, 1988 (age 36); Pančevo, SFR Yugoslavia
- Modeling information
- Height: 5 ft 11 in (1.80 m)
- Hair color: Light brown
- Eye color: Green
- Agency: Supreme Management (New York, Paris); Women Management (Milan); Uno Models (Barcelona); Munich Models (Munich)

Georgina Stojiljkovic (born Đurđa Stojiljković; May 19, 1988) is a Serbian fashion model and one of the biggest Serbian supermodels. She was born in Pančevo, SFR Yugoslavia.

== Career ==
Stojiljkovic was discovered by an Italian scout at a fashion show in Belgrade. Since then she has been in fashion shows for designers including Alberta Ferretti, Armani, Bottega Veneta, Christian Dior, DKNY, Dolce & Gabbana, Hermès, Iceberg, Lacoste, Lanvin, Oscar de la Renta, Prada, Versace & Valentino. She has been on the covers of French Vogue and Numero (#93 May 2008), Flair Magazine, Serbian Elle (September 2009 and May 2011), special edition of Vogue Italia and in advertisements for Philosophy di Alberta Ferretti, for Jean-Paul Gaultier and for Gianfranco Ferré, with styling by Giovanna Bataglia.

== Calendar model and student ==
She was chosen to be in the 2010 Pirelli Calendar photographed by Terry Richardson in Bahia, Brazil. While modeling, she was a student of political science, active on the volunteering projects supported by the United Nations. Georgina Stojiljkovic is currently represented by Women Model Management in NYC, Milan and Paris. In 2011 she closed the Christian Dior Haute Couture Spring 2011 show, in Paris. She also was cast in Target's Commercial The Everyday Collection. By Target. - "Bake Sale"

== Notability ==
In 2011 she closed the Christian Dior Haute Couture Spring 2011 show, in Paris.
