= Robert Freeman (photographer) =

English photographer (1936–2019)

- Robert Freeman at the Pirelli Calendar 50th Anniversary Red Carpet in 2013
- Born: 5 December 1936; London, England
- Died: November 2019 (aged 82); London, England
- Education: Clare College, Cambridge
- Known for: Photographing album covers for the Beatles
- Notable work: Pirelli Calendar
- Spouse(s): Sonny Freeman; Tiddy Rowan

Robert Freeman (5 December 1936 – 6 or 7 November 2019) was an English photographer and graphic designer best known for his work with the Beatles, shooting some of the band's most recognizable images featured on several of their album covers. From 1963 to 1966, he worked extensively with the group and did the photography and design on four of their album sleeves released on the Parlophone label in the UK, as well as on several albums on Capitol Records in the US and on various labels in other countries. Freeman designed the end credit sequences for their first two films and some of the graphics and photography displayed on the films' posters and promotional materials.

== Early life and career ==
Robert Freeman was born in West Wickham, then in Kent, to Freddy Freeman, an insurance broker for London theatres, and his wife Dorothy. He was educated at Ardingly College, a minor public school in West Sussex, and Clare College, Cambridge, where he graduated with a degree in modern languages in 1959. While at Cambridge, Freeman pursued his interest in photography, edited the university magazine, and attended lectures given by the famed historian of English architecture, Nikolaus Pevsner.

Freeman first came to prominence as a photo journalist working for the British newspaper The Sunday Times, for which he photographed a variety of subjects, including Nikita Khrushchev in the Kremlin. He had also become noted for his black-and-white photographs of several jazz musicians including John Coltrane. It was these photographs which impressed the Beatles' manager Brian Epstein and the Beatles themselves and led to his first commission in August 1963 to photograph the group. He was selected to photograph the entirety of the first ever Pirelli Calendar, shot in 1963 for the year 1964.

Later, following his collaborations with The Beatles (see below), Freeman turned his hand to making films. He directed the Swinging London cult film The Touchables in 1968, which starred Judy Huxtable and David Anthony, and featured music by the British band Nirvana. He then co-directed the 1969 film Secret World (La Promesse) with Paul Feyder.

== Work with the Beatles ==
=== Origins ===
In the summer of '63. I'd been a photographer for two years but had already established a reputation through my work for The Sunday Times and other magazines. I'd recently been on assignment in Moscow to photograph Khrushchev in the Kremlin, and earlier that year had shot the first Pirelli calendar. This was a big hit and, in later years, a media event. But my favourite assignment during that period was photographing John Coltrane and other jazz musicians at a festival in London. It was photographs of these musicians that I later showed to the Beatles. ... I contacted their press agent in London. He referred me to Brian Epstein, their manager, who asked me to send samples of my work to Llandudno, in Wales, where the Beatles were playing at the time. I put together a portfolio of large black-and-white prints, most of which were portraits of jazz musicians—Cannonball Adderley, Dizzy Gillespie, Elvin Jones, Coleman Hawkins and John Coltrane. The Beatles' response was positive, they liked the photographs and, as a result, Brian arranged for me to meet them in Bournemouth a week later where they were booked to play several evenings at the local Gaumont cinema.

— Robert Freeman, The Beatles, A Private View (1995)

=== With the Beatles ===
The cover for With the Beatles was shot by Freeman on 22 August 1963 in the Palace Court Hotel, Bournemouth, England.

Freeman recalled:

They had to fit in the square format of the cover, so rather than have them all in a line, I put Ringo in the bottom right corner, since he was the last to join the group. He was also the shortest.

Paul McCartney's recollection of the session:

He arranged us in a hotel corridor: it was very un-studio-like. The corridor was very dark, and there was a window at the end, and by using this heavy source of natural light coming from the right, he got that very moody picture which most people think he must have worked at forever and ever. But it was only an hour. He sat down, took a couple of rolls, and that was it.

The original idea was to print the picture from edge to edge, with no border or title, but the studio vetoed it, on the grounds that the Beatles were not yet famous enough to carry a nameless cover. (The first album to carry an edge-to-edge cover was The Rolling Stones' self-titled debut, released a few months later.) The studio also tried to pull the cover, because the Beatles were not smiling, and it was only after George Martin intervened that they won the day. Freeman was paid £75 for his work, three times the normal fee.

=== Beatles for Sale ===
The album cover for Beatles for Sale shows the Beatles in an autumnal setting photographed in Hyde Park, London. McCartney recalled: "The album cover was rather nice: Robert Freeman's photos. It was easy. We did a session lasting a couple of hours and had some reasonable pictures to use ... The photographer would always be able to say to us, 'Just show up,' because we all wore the same kind of gear all the time. Black stuff; white shirts and big black scarves."

The album also features a gatefold cover, the photo inside the gatefold cover showed the Beatles standing in front of a montage of photos.

=== Help! ===
The Help! album cover seems to feature the group spelling out a word in semaphore; the British Parlophone release featured the word 'NUJV', whilst the slightly re-arranged United States release on Capitol Records appeared to feature the word 'NVUJ'. However, it may be argued that some of the members of the band were not only re-arranged but reversed as well.

The following semaphore characters show the correct spelling of "HELP" as seen if facing the flagman:

H	E	L	P

However, the truth is the photo does not spell any message at all in semaphore. Robert Freeman confirmed this: "I had the idea of semaphore spelling out the letters HELP. But when we came to do the shot the arrangement of the arms with those letters didn't look good. So we decided to improvise and ended up with the best graphic positioning of the arms."

=== Rubber Soul ===
The photo of the Beatles on the Rubber Soul cover appears stretched. McCartney relates the story behind this in Volume 5 of the documentary film Anthology. Freeman had taken some pictures of the Beatles at Lennon's house. Freeman showed the photos to the Beatles by projecting them onto an album-sized piece of cardboard to simulate how they would appear on an album cover. The unusual Rubber Soul album cover came to be when the slide card fell slightly backwards, elongating the projected image of the photograph and stretching it. Excited by the effect, they shouted, "Ah! Can we have that? Can you do it like that?" Freeman said he could.

The lettering was designed by Charles Front.

== Personal life ==
In the 1960s, Freeman was married to a German-born model, known at the time as Sonny Freeman, with whom he had two children; her maiden name is Spielhagen, she remarried John Drane. He was later married to author Tiddy Rowan with whom he had a daughter.

According to a claim in Philip Norman's 2008 biography of Lennon, between 1963 and 1965, Freeman's then wife, Sonny Drane (a model and 1964 Pirelli calendar-girl), had a year-long clandestine affair with John Lennon. Norman further claimed that she was the inspiration for Lennon's song "Norwegian Wood (This Bird Has Flown)". No evidence for this claim has been presented other than Drane's own claim to Norman—made for the first time 43 years after the alleged event. Her claim to have inspired the song was not based on any conversation Drane had with Lennon subsequent to the song's composition—just her supposition. Freeman has made no public comment on his ex-wife's belated claim. However John Lennon stated that "Norwegian Wood (This Bird Has Flown)" was inspired by an affair he was having at the time, but he didn't state with whom.

According to McCartney, Lennon lived in the same London building as Freeman "for awhile".

This claim is further substantiated by Cynthia Lennon in her 2005 autobiography. According to her claim, sometime after the couple moved to their estate in Kenwood, they were confronted by a furious Bob Freeman accompanied by his wife who appeared in tears behind him. Cynthia Lennon stated that "Bob ignored me and said he wanted to talk to John. They all disappeared into the living room. When John came back into the kitchen I asked him what had been going on, but he shrugged and disappeared upstairs. It was never mentioned between us again, but not long afterwards I heard that Bob and Stacy were divorcing. I couldn't escape the conclusion that she'd had an affair with John".

In September 2009, whilst on holiday and staying with his sister in Reigate, Robert Freeman suffered a severe stroke and was admitted to hospital in Redhill. Afterward, he recuperated in a nursing home in Reigate. His family sold a copy of one of his John Lennon portraits online as a way to pay for his care and help him financially to work on preserving his archive while he was recuperating. This was supported by Paul McCartney's official website.

Freeman died on 6 or 7 November 2019 in London. The cause of his death was pneumonia.

=== Loss of photographic archive ===
During the weekend of 14–15 December 2019, more than a month after the photographer's death, someone broke into his apartment in southwest London, where he had spent his last years. The unknown perpetrator stole his entire photographic archive.

== Publications ==
- Freeman, Robert, The Beatles: A Private View Barnes & Noble, New York, 2003, ISBN 1-59226-176-0
