= Sonny Drane =

German-born English model

- Born: Sonnhild Spielhagen; 13 March 1939 (age 87); Berlin, Nazi Germany
- Other name: Sonny Freeman Drane
- Occupation: Model

Sonnhild Spielhagen, better known as Sonny Drane (born 13 March 1939), is a German-born English former model who was briefly popular in Britain in the 1960s. She was propelled to prominence when her first husband, noted British photographer Robert Freeman, included images of her in the first-ever Pirelli Calendar, for which he was the sole photographer. At that time, she was known as Sonny Freeman. She has been married since the 1970s to her second husband, John Drane.

In 2008, biographer Philip Norman wrote that Drane was the inspiration for John Lennon's composition "Norwegian Wood", recorded by The Beatles in 1965.

== Background ==
Born Sonnhild Spielhagen in Berlin, Nazi Germany, in 1939, Drane grew up in Great Britain during post-World War II years. Her father Wolfgang Spielhagen (1891–1945) was the Deputy Mayor of the City of Breslau (now Wrocław, Poland). He was firmly anti-Hitler, resulting in Nazi Party Gauleiter Karl Hanke having him executed in January 1945. Norman says that, though she was German-born, in the 1960s, she used to tell people that she was Norwegian. Drane's mother was Eva Spielhagen, née Thiel (1901–1989).

She is described by writer Philip Norman as having been an early 1960s model "with impish looks and a rangy physique that perfectly set off the new 'fun' fashions of young designers like Mary Quant." Photographed in Mallorca by her first husband Robert Freeman, images of her were prominently featured in the inaugural 1964 Pirelli Calendar as the calendar-girl for the months of February, March, May, July, September and October.

In the 1970s, Robert Freeman divorced her, and she subsequently remarried John Drane, taking his last name as her own. She is still married to Drane.

In 1963, while she was married to Robert Freeman (who had recently begun his professional relationship with the Beatles), John Lennon was looking for a home to rent in London for himself and his wife Cynthia. Freeman suggested that the couple take a flat in the same building in the South Kensington area of London that he lived in. Freeman had become a good friend of the Beatles and socialized with them. Writer Philip Norman says that Sonny also joined Freeman in socializing with Lennon and his wife. He further says that she became personally close to Lennon, and that they would often stay up late together talking "about things like life death, the way you do when you're young."

== "Norwegian Wood" ==
In his 2008 biography of Lennon, writer Philip Norman includes the claim that Drane conducted a clandestine affair with Lennon for over a year. He writes that the lyrics of the song "Norwegian Wood" are an implicit reference by Lennon to his alleged affair with Drane.
