= Mo Wandan =

Chinese fashion model (born 1987)

- Born: 29 January 1987 (age 39); Shenzhen, Guangdong Province, China
- Occupation: Model
- Modeling information
- Height: 5 ft 10.5 in (1.79 m)
- Hair color: Black
- Eye color: Brown
- Agency: Next Management

Mo Wandan (Chinese: 莫万丹; pinyin: mò wàndān) is a Chinese fashion model who rose to fame after winning China's China Model Star Contest in 2004. Since then she appeared on runways at international fashion shows and on the covers of fashion magazines including Elle and L'Officiel.

== Career ==
Mo was born in 1987 in Shenzhen, Guangdong Province. Her career in professional modeling began in 2004 after she participated in Chinese modeling contest China Model Star Contest (中国模特之星大赛) in which she later won to appear at the 2004 China Fashion Week. After signing with Next Management she appeared at the Spring Armani Privé and Christian Dior couture shows in Paris and modeled for the Christian Dior catalog. In 2007 she became the face of Roccobarocco for fall and appeared on the covers of Elle (Chinese edition) and L'Officiel.

In 2007 Tianjin Polytechnic University employed Mo as a part time lecturer teaching two semester a year to share her experiences with students at its art and fashion design school.
