= Prince Gyasi =

Ghanaian visual artist (born 1995)

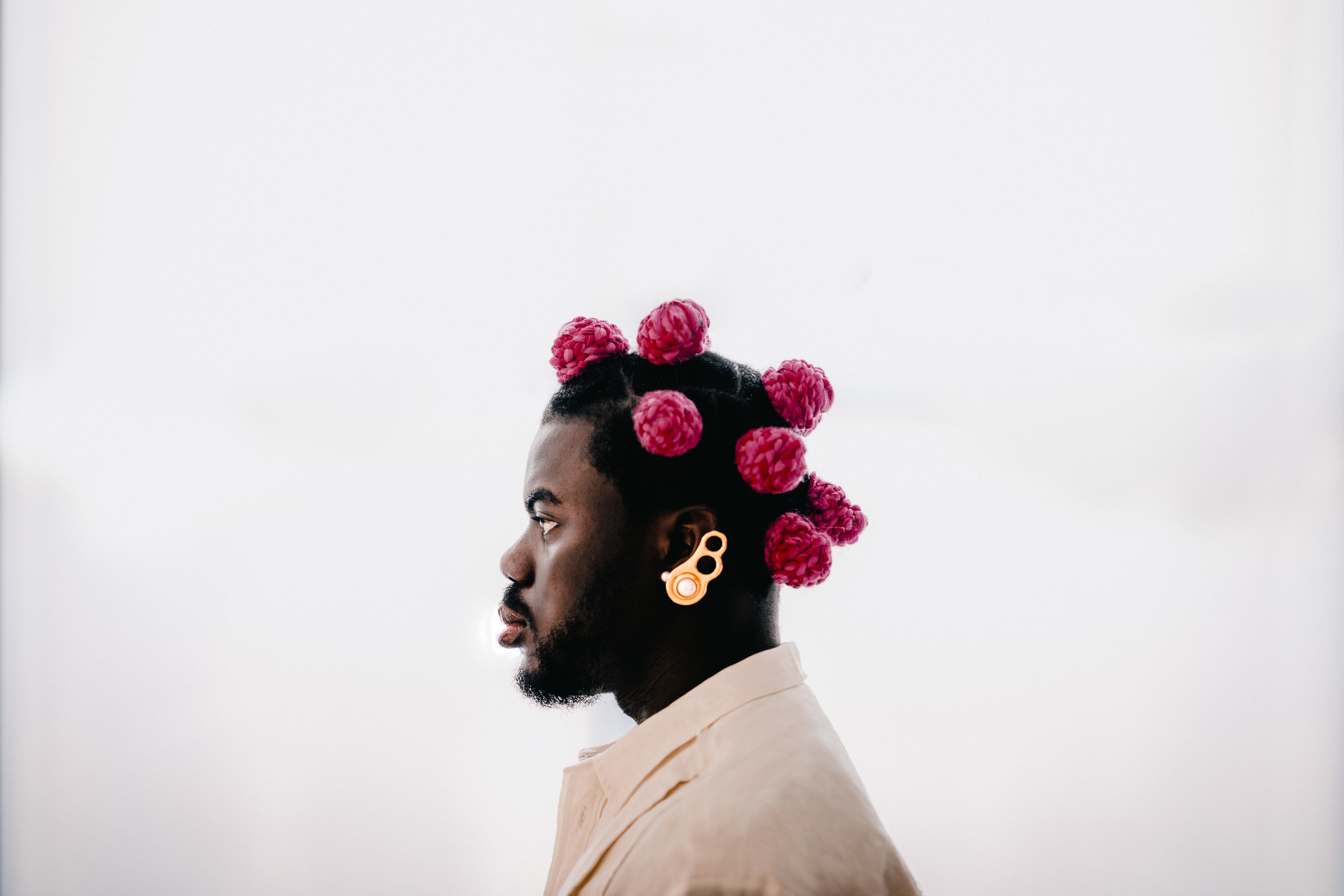
- Portrait of Prince Gyasi.
- Born: Prince Gyasi Nyantakyi; Accra, Ghana
- Known for: Visual art, photography
- Website: Official Website

Prince Gyasi Nyantakyi also known by the artist name Prince Gyasi is a Ghanaian international visual artist. He is the co-founder of Boxedkids, a non-profit organization helping kids from Accra pursue education.

== Early life ==
Prince Gyasi was born and raised in Accra, the capital of Ghana.

== Career ==
Gyasi started taking pictures in 2011 and bought his first iPhone in 2014 which was his primary tool he uses in creating his art pieces at the time. He began with snapshots of friends, family and models from his hometown of Ghana and then realized he could seriously use his phone as an arts creation tool, as a means of expression.

Even though he shot with DSLR and film camera's he using iPhone to shoot at the time was a way to distinguish his art from other visual artists and photographers to break the codes of this singular and elitist art. His work is all about conveying feelings through colors and giving the floor to the people that are left aside from the society. He indeed considers his use of colors as a source of therapy to his audience. Motherhood, Fatherhood, childhood can be considered as his most characteristic themes.

Prince's art practice over the years has gotten him to be comfortable with the mediums he chooses to express himself with, which has gotten him recognized as Time's Next Generation Leader in visual artistry.

== Exhibition ==
Prince Gyasi currently is signed to Maāt Gallery. He previously was signed to Nil Gallery Paris in 2018 which allowed him the opportunity to exhibit his art pieces at multiple art fairs in the USA.

He has exhibited in the Seattle Contemporary Art fair, Texas Contemporary Art Fair, Artsy & Context Art Miami and pulse Contemporary Art Fair (Art Basel Miami). Prince has also exhibited some of his works at the Investec Cape Town Art Fair in South Africa. He exhibited at the Paris Photo at the Grand Palais Ephémère for the first time in November 11 to 14 of 2021.

=== KYOTOGRAPHIE International Photography Festival ===
Prince was the leading artist for the 10th anniversary of the KYOTOGRAPHIE International Photography Festival. His solo show took place in a three-storey building in Kyoto, entirely devoted to his work.

=== Group Show at the Museo de Arte do Rio ===
Prince's works featured in the Group exhibition "Um defeito de cor" at the Museo de Arte do Rio from September 10, 2022 until May 21, 2023.

=== FEMMES ===
Prince's participated in a group exhibition curated by Pharrell Williams at the Perrotin in Paris titled FEMMES. This exhibition was curated to explore feminity in the eyes of the various artists who participated in the exhibition.

== Collaborations ==
=== A Great Day In Accra ===
In December 2018, he was commissioned by Apple Inc. to work on a project in Ghana titled A Great Day In Accra to push the Hiplife music genre in Ghana to the world. In this project he shot Ghanaian hiplife musicians like Gyedu-Blay Ambolley, Reggie Rockstone, Okyeame Kwame, Rab Bakari, Abrewa Nana, Hammer of The Last Two, Beat Menace, Gurunkz, Joey B, EL (rapper), DJ Breezy, Stargo, Kirani Ayat, Akan (Musician), Kiddblack, Ansah Live, Imani N.A.D, Toyboi, Kwesi Arthur and Shadow.

=== GQ Summer/Spring Issue 2020 ===
In December 2019, Prince was commissioned by GQ Style to shoot Burna Boy for their Summer/Spring Issue 2020 in Ikoyi, Lagos. The shoot was titled "Global Giant" due to the release of Burna's album "African Giant".

=== Off-White Collaboration ===
Prince was featured in Virgil Abloh’s Spring/Summer 2021 collection Off-White brand, which premiered in February on Imaginary TV. He performed alongside Virgil Abloh’s new creative cast; Milanese choreographer, Michele Rizzo and Japanese DJ, Kiri Okuyama, all wearing apparel from the brand's new line.

Prince also modeled the new Off-White SS21 collection, which was featured on Farfetch in March 2021.

=== Naomi Campbell for Madame Figaro ===
In 26 March 2021, Prince got commissioned by Madame Figaro France to shoot Naomi Campbell for the cover image of that issue. The shoot was styled by Jenke Ahmed Tailly and was shot in Lagos during Arise Fashion Week.

=== GQ Magazine October Issue ===
In September 2021, Prince was commissioned by GQ Magazine to shoot Wizkid for its October issue in Accra, Ghana. Wizkid was crowned “King of Afropop” by GQ Magazine after this shoot which was styled by Karen Binns.

=== Balmain Fall 2022 Collection ===
In the fall of 2022, he was commissioned by Balmain head designer Olivier Rousteing to retell the story of Le Petit Prince through images he shot for the Fall 2022 collection.

=== Converse #CreateNext Campaign ===
In October 2022 he collaborated with Converse in their Create Now and Create Next campaign, in which he contributed to the creation of the short films produced for the campaign.

=== Pirelli 60th Anniversary Calendar ===
In 2024, to celebrate the 60th anniversary of The Cal, a calendar published by Pirelli, he became the first Black photographer to produce an edition of the calendar. In this issue Prince shot the following people for The Cal, they are Otumfuo Nana Osei Tutu II, Naomi Campbell, Margot Lee Shetterly, Angela Bassett, Amanda Gorman, Tiwa Savage, Idris Elba, Jeymes Samuel, Amoako Boafo, Teyana Taylor and Marcel Desailly.

=== Balmain Fall 2024 Collection ===
In January 2024, Prince collaborated with Balmain's creative director Olivier Rousteing to reproduce his images on garments and turn them into clothes.

== Collections ==
In March 2022, Gyasi's art works entered the Jean Pigozzi's art collections and the collections of François Pinault. La Fab (the Agnes b. Art Foundation) acquired and integrated his works into a group exhibition curated and presented by Agnès b. The exhibition entitled "L'enfance dans la collection Agnès b." was dedicated to childhood and was held from February 24 to June 30, 2022 at La Fab, in Paris. In July 12 to August 21, his works were also integrated into the group show Bande-Annonce, an exhibition held at the Pole of Contemporary Art of Cannes featuring part of Jean Pigozzi's collection of contemporary African art.

== Art Market ==
Gyasi is currently represented by Maāt Gallery and was previously with Nil Gallery in Paris, France. In 2022, his Power of Choice (last edition 2021) sold for EUR 20,160 at Christie's in Londres, Somerset House. His Symbols of Womanhood (last edition 2018) sold for GBP 11,340 at Christie's and his work The Arrival (last edition) sold for EUR 44,100 at Phillips auction.

== Recognitions ==
- He was mentioned by Vanity Fair as one of the top 9 visual artist to follow in 2018.
- Prince Gyasi was part of five black photographers interviewed by Good Morning America to speak about their work and about Vogue's historic cover with Beyoncé.
- Prince Gyasi has been featured on BBC Africa for his unorthodox method of making images with his iPhone.
- Prince has also been featured by CNN Style as one of seven leading African photographers from across the continent.
- Prince was featured again by CNN on how his work turns to color therapy for a lot of his followers. The article also mentioned how Prince was one of the most sought after artist on the art marketplace Artsy, moving from 54th to 2nd place in 2020.
- Prince's art pieces, offered at fairs on Artsy in 2021, has had a significant number of collectors inquiring about them, compared to others on the platform.
- Prince was also recognized in 2023 as a Time's Next Generation Leader for his work around visual arts.

== Speaking engagements ==
=== 2019 Skoll World Forum ===
Prince Gyasi was invited on 9 April 2019 to give a speech about his creative works during the 2019 Skoll World Forum at the Oxford University in London. During his speech, he spoke about the stories behind his work of arts and his influences. He also spoke about his non-profit organization BoxedKids, which he co-founded.
