= Felix Burrichter =

German architect and writer (born 1978)

Felix Burrichter (born 1978, Germany) is an architect, publisher, curator, creative director, and writer. Burrichter is the founder of Pin-Up magazine, a biannual architecture and design publication where he currently serves as the magazine's editorial and creative director. Burrichter has curated internationally at institutions including the Haus der Kunst, Swiss Institute, and Museum of Arts and Design and has published architecture, design, and artist monographs for Rizzoli and Powerhouse. In 2011, he was awarded the Art Director's Club America Gold Medal for Editorial Design. Burrichter lives and works in New York, New York.

== Early life and education ==
Burrichter was born and raised in Düsseldorf, Germany and attended part of high school in Southern California. He studied architecture at the École Spéciale d'Architecture as well as École Nationale Supérieure d'Architecture de Paris-Belleville in Paris, France and moved to New York City to obtain a master's degree at Columbia University.

== Work ==
=== Pin-Up magazine ===
In 2006, Burrichter launched Pin-Up magazine after working at a corporate New York architecture firm drawing Photoshop illustrations and making mood boards. The bi-annual publication, known as the "Magazine for Architectural Entertainment", covers a range of highbrow and lowbrow topics in fashion, art, politics, architecture, and design. Burrichter credits his time as an intern at Butt magazine in Amsterdam under Jop van Bennekom and Gert Jonkers (of Fantastic Man magazine) for inspiration to forge a new magazine that loosened up the idea of the architect as genius. The magazine has run features and interviews on a number of prominent architects such as Frank Gehry, Rem Koolhaas, Zaha Hadid, Maria Pergay, Paulo Mendes da Rocha, Martino Gamper, and Ettore Sottsass.

=== Curatorial practice ===
Burrichter curated an exhibition, titled Paper Weight – Genre-Defining Magazines 2000 to Now, at the Haus der Kunst in 2013 that surveyed the rise of 15 independent publications having launched since the dawn of the 21st century. The exhibition included a range of magazine's covering architecture, design, sex and fashion such as Apartamento, 032c, The Gentlewoman, Toilet Paper, Girls Like Us, CANDY, and White Zinfandel.

In 2015, Burrichter asked 10 international designers to populate a Stockholm park with benches of their imagination in a 2015 public art project titled Superbenches. The park included original works by Philippe Malouin, Naihan Li, Max Lamb, Märta Hägglund and Sanna Gripner, and Luca Cipelletti, amongst several others. Later that year, Burrichter curated Pavillon de l'Esprit Nouveau: A 21st Century Show Home. The exhibition, located at the Swiss Institute, used architect and designer Le Corbusier as guide for exploring 21st-century domesticity.

Michael Bullock and Burrichter curated a day-long eco-conference in 2016 called SEEDING at the Museum of Arts and Design.

In 2019, Burrichter collaborated with Adam Charlap Hyman of interior design firm Charlap Hyman & Herrero on an exhibit Blow-Up. The exhibition at Friedman Benda gallery in Chelsea was dubbed a "Freudian trip through a 1:1 dollhouse", and featured design works by Gaetano Pesce, Studio España, Katie Stout, Misha Kahn, Telfar Clemens, and more.

=== Editorial ===
Burrichter has been a contributing writer to T: The New York Times Style Magazine, Fantastic Man, W, and Wired Italia

From 2008 to 2010, he served as Butt magazine's editor.

Burrichter edited Studio Work, a 2012 monograph of work by photographer Paul Mpagi Sepuya. The book featured portraits, snapshots, and various archival ephemera inside the artist's studio as well as text by writer Wayne Konstenbaum.

Pin-Up Interviews was published in 2013 and covers over 50 conversations and interviews from previous Pin-Up issues. The 448-page work doesn't include any pictures and subjects include architects Odile Decq and Charles Renfro, fashion designers Rick Owens and Hedi Slimane, and artists Daniel Arsham and Robert Wilson.

In 2017, Burrichter wrote and edited a monograph of Italian design furniture titled Cassina: This Will Be the Place: Thoughts and Photographs About the Future of Interiors. The book includes five interviews with architecture and design scholars and practitioners including curator and historian Beatriz Colomina and Finnish architect Martti Kalliala as well as five conceptual ideas turned into conceptual interiors, each with pieces from Cassina's catalog.

In 2021, after 15 years as the publication's editor, Burrichter brought on furniture designer and writer Emmanuel Olunkwa to serve as the new editor.

A limited-edition art book, Barbie Dreamhouse: An Architectural Survey, was published by PIN-UP and Mattel in late 2022. The monograph honored the dreamhouse's 60-year milestone.
