= Michael Bullock (writer) =

American writer, editor and filmmaker

- Born: North Attleboro, Massachusetts, U.S.
- Education: Rhode Island School of Design
- Occupations: Writer; independent publisher; editor; curator; documentary filmmaker
- Years active: 2000s–present
- Known for: Apartamento; PIN–UP; Butt; Roman Catholic Jacuzzi; Peter Berlin: Icon, Artist, Photosexual; Fire Island Art: 100 Years

Michael Bullock is an American writer, independent publisher, editor, curator and documentary filmmaker based in Brooklyn, New York. Since the early 2000s he has worked in queer publishing and visual culture, as the longtime U.S. publisher of Butt magazine, a contributing editor at Apartamento and currently associate publisher of PIN–UP and The Whitney Review of New Writing. He is the author of the novel Roman Catholic Jacuzzi and the editor of Peter Berlin: Icon, Artist, Photosexual. Alongside this editorial work, he has co-directed documentary films for PIN–UP and the Cooper Hewitt's Design Triennial, founded the political fundraising platform The Weekly Senator, and was part of the political activist group Downtown for Democracy.

== Early career ==
Born and raised in North Attleboro, Massachusetts, Bullock studied at the Rhode Island School of Design before moving to New York City at the start of his career. In the early 2000s Bullock worked at Index magazine, where he was head of advertising. By 2001 he was commissioning work from the magazine's then 23-year-old staff photographer, Ryan McGinley. A year later he launched Index Books, a publishing offshoot of the magazine dedicated to limited-edition photography books by its own contributors, starting with McGinley; the idea, Bullock explained, was "to give the index audience the opportunity to see the personal work of some of the young photographers who we work with." When McGinley's debut museum show, "The Kids Are Alright," opened at the Whitney Museum in February 2003, part of the museum's "First Look" series introducing young photographers; Bullock, reflecting on how quickly a photographer Index had first published in 2000 had risen to art-world prominence, told The New York Times: "I've never seen something come to global domination so quickly."

== From Butt to Apartamento ==
Bullock served as the U.S. publisher of Butt, the Dutch magazine for gay men founded by Jop van Bennekom and Gert Jonkers (who would go on to launch Fantastic Man) from 2004 to 2011, a run during which he also contributed many of its interviews. In 2008, looking for a new creative outlet, he joined Apartamento as a contributing editor from its second issue, drawn to the chance to talk with gay and queer subjects about their lives. His first piece for the magazine was an interview with the writer Christopher Bollen, then editor of Interview, conducted at Bollen's house, a small cottage tucked in the West Village.By 2015 he had also become the American director of advertising at Fantastic Man.

Since then he has built up a body of interviews that includes the performer Justin Vivian Bond (issue #5, 2010), the photographer and performer Peter Berlin, the artist Kembra Pfahler (her interview was later reprinted in her first monograph), the painter and drag performer TABBOO!, the artist Victor Barragán, the performer Agosto Machado, and the actor and artist Jerry Torre, known for his appearance in the documentary Grey Gardens (1975). He has also written for Fantastic Man, Interview, Aperture, Blau International, Flash Art, Frieze and New York Magazine; for the latter, a 2018 oral history of the ballroom House of Xtravaganza built around a portrait commissioned by Aperture; for Aperture itself, he later conducted a 2026 interview with the photographer Wolfgang Tillmans about his home on Fire Island, published alongside Fire Island Art: 100 Years; and for PIN–UP, a profile of the self-taught Oakland artist William Scott of the Creative Growth Art Center. Bullock is now associate publisher of PIN–UP and The Whitney Review of New Writing; he has also worked on the publishing side of The Gentlewoman.

According to Felix Burrichter, the founder and editor of PIN–UP, he approached Bullock, then U.S. publisher of Butt, where Burrichter had interned, to help launch PIN–UP by selling advertising. Bullock was initially unconvinced, but once the first issue appeared he judged the project serious, and the two have worked together ever since. Bullock later became PIN–UP's associate publisher. Burrichter has described Bullock's role in New York's independent publishing scene:

He works on Pinup, and he also is now working on the Whitney Review of New Writing, which is a broadsheet that Whitney Mallett started, who is also contributing editor to Pinup. He's really instrumental in a lot of independent publishing in New York.

— Felix Burrichter, 2026 interview on Handle with Care

== Books ==
Bullock is the author of the novel Roman Catholic Jacuzzi (Karma, 2012), an autobiographical novella recounting his accidental discovery of a secret retreat for gay Catholic priests. The book was launched at Artists Space in New York in April 2013, with the launch event also covered by GAYLETTER.

The origin of his best-known book, Peter Berlin: Icon, Artist, Photosexual, was, by his own account, almost accidental, it came out of his Apartamento interview with Berlin:

Peter Berlin was really special because after the interview I told him, 'It's really a shame that young people or anyone that cares about art or gay culture can't see your contribution to history in one place'. He said, 'Well, everyone says this, but no one brings me a book deal'. So I brought him back a book deal and we made that book.

— Michael Bullock, 2026 interview with Apartamento

The result was Peter Berlin: Icon, Artist, Photosexual (Damiani, 2019), finished just before the COVID-19 pandemic. Both WWD and the Los Angeles Blade covered its release and credited Bullock as editor. The book's launch, in November 2019, drew a crowd of downtown fixtures to a signing at Marc Jacobs's West Village bookstore, BookMarc, followed by an after-party at Le Chalet in Saks Fifth Avenue; The New York Times, covering the event, listed Bullock among the guests as "the book's editor."

He also co-edited, with Cesar Padilla, I Could Not Believe It: The 1979 Teenage Diaries of Sean DeLear (Semiotext(e)/MIT Press, 2023), with an introduction by Brontez Purnell, the teenage diaries of a Black, queer kid from Simi Valley who would go on to become a fixture of the Los Angeles punk scene. Ahead of publication, The Paris Review ran an extended excerpt; once out, the book received a substantial review in the Poetry Project Newsletter by Kyle Carrero Lopez, who highlighted its portrait of "Black nonchalance" and its role in correcting the record on punk as supposedly white culture. Its New York launch, hosted by the Poetry Project, featured Bullock himself as one of the readers, alongside Juliana Huxtable and Kembra Pfahler, among others. Bullock met Sean DeLear at a house party in 2007, and after DeLear's death in 2017 he and co-editor Cesar Padilla secured the rights to publish the diaries from his estate. A documentary on DeLear's life, directed by Markus Zizenbacher and drawing on archival footage and interviews with Bullock and Padilla, was in production as of 2026. Reflecting on how the diary differed from familiar coming-of-age narratives, Bullock said:

Up until that point, gay coming-of-age narratives were about: 'How do I tell people?' and getting over this deep shame. That that wasn't part of his trajectory was an incredible thing to me. And I thought that could be a very useful idea to a lot of other people dealing with sexuality: not accepting that shame.

— Michael Bullock, W Magazine, 2023

Most recently, Bullock wrote the closing essay for Fire Island Art: 100 Years (edited by John Dempsey, The Monacelli Press, 2026) and helped curate the book's selection of contemporary artists, a contribution Dempsey has credited directly, saying Bullock authored the closing essay and helped curate the book's roster of contemporary artists.

Reviewing the book for The Guardian, Jesse Dorris singled out Bullock's contribution:

In an elegant chapter towards the end of the book, Michael Bullock, the writer, editor and documentary film-maker, tracks the ongoing legacy of these efforts, which have nurtured the now-blockbuster art careers of Salman Toor, Raúl de Nieves, Cassils and Babirye herself.

— Jesse Dorris, The Guardian, 2026

Bullock also contributed a personal essay, "Multiplicity of Home," to Making Home: Belonging, Memory, and Utopia in the 21st Century (Cooper Hewitt/The MIT Press, 2025), published alongside the Smithsonian Design Triennial of the same name. In it, paired with a reflection by the artist Journey Streams, he wrote about growing up queer in North Attleboro, Massachusetts.

Alongside his editorial work, Bullock maintains a personal practice of autobiographical erotic writing, which he has read at live events in New York such as the online erotica series Heaven Tonight. At the series' live debut in April 2023, he read "The Godfathers," an autofictional account of a threesome with his boyfriend and a closeted acquaintance; reviewing the piece for Vulture, Whitney Mallett wrote:

Straddling coded humor and poly-marriage mediations, the story is surprisingly tender, even with lines about "pumping our dicks in his hole."

— Whitney Mallett, Vulture, 2023

Bullock said the practice lets him process his upbringing in a Catholic family in suburban Massachusetts:

Writing is an important part of how I process these complicated and deeply embedded feelings. I can synthesize them, through narrative, in a way that doesn't flatten them.

— Michael Bullock, 2023 interview with Vulture

In 2026 Bullock has written the introduction to Pandemic Architecture: NYC Dining Sheds 2020–2024, a photography book by the designer Penny Hardy documenting the makeshift outdoor dining structures that sprang up across New York City during the COVID-19 pandemic. Writing about the phenomenon, he described it, as The New York Times reported, as "a democracy of building" that "the city had not seen in modern memory."

== Filmmaking ==
Bullock has said that his work for Apartamento turned him into a filmmaker almost by accident: while interviewing TABBOO! he met the filmmaker Michael Cukr, and the two went on to make a documentary about the artist, followed by one on Victor Barragán. They later made Built Ecologies (2023), a six-part documentary series for PIN–UP and the Museum of Modern Art's Emilio Ambasz Institute, and co-directed Dream Homes, a film for PIN–UP on experimental queer communes across the United States, commissioned for the Cooper Hewitt's Design Triennial, Making Home (2024–2025).

== Curating ==
In 2026, Bullock co-curated, with the theatre and opera director Fabio Cherstich, the exhibition Larry Stanton: Friends + Lovers, bringing together the artist's photographs and Super 8 films of Fire Island in the 1970s; both curators had also contributed chapters to Fire Island Art: 100 Years. The show opened at 230 Bay Walk in Fire Island Pines before moving to the Fire Island Pines Visitors Center, where it remained on view until 5 August 2026. Of Stanton's photographs, Bullock said they record "a mutual exchange of charisma, beauty and charm between photographer and subject," rather than "one-sided objectification."

== Activism ==
Bullock was part of Downtown for Democracy (D4D), a political action committee founded in 2003 by a group of New York creative professionals to mobilize the city's artists, musicians, filmmakers and publishing industry behind progressive politics ahead of the 2004 presidential election, raising money through cultural events such as art auctions and public readings and directing it to grassroots efforts in battleground states including Ohio and Pennsylvania. The group was relaunched as a PAC in 2017 to organize against the Trump administration's agenda, continuing to raise funds through art editions and voter-registration drives. In 2005, The New York Times Magazine described him as "a publishing consultant" part of a steering-committee meeting of Downtown for Democracy (D4D):

Liberals will continue to lose as long as we view politics as a chore. We need to build a culture of engagement that people actually want to be a part of.

— Michael Bullock, 2005 interview with The New York Times Magazine

Four years later, Bullock co-organized an "alternative Gay Pride" video art exhibition titled BUTT IN ASS at Terence Koh's Asia Song Society gallery in New York, together with Yasmine Dubois-Ziai. The show was conceived partly as a response to police entrapment practices targeting gay men and to the commercialization of the Pride parade. Bullock explained:

The show BUTT IN ASS was actually created to call attention to how far we have not come in New York... The parade somehow has become about gay churches and corporate sponsors.

— Michael Bullock, Dazed Digital, 2009

Bullock founded The Weekly Senator (WeeklySenator.org) in 2020, a voter education and donation platform run with Downtown for Democracy: each week, members received an email featuring a different Democratic Senate candidate and could either keep their two-dollar weekly donation directed to that candidate or redirect it to one of five partner nonprofits, targeting the 22 Republican-held seats up for election in the 2022 midterms. He told WWD that if 10,000 of the magazine's readers joined, the platform could fund about a million dollars a year in Senate campaigns. Discussing the project further, he argued that the Senate's makeup should better reflect the roughly five percent of Americans who are LGBTQ, and that 75 countries still criminalized LGBTQ people:

Many governments look to America, the 'land of the free' to see how we treat our LGBTQ citizens.

— Michael Bullock, 2020 interview with WWD
