= Silvia Prada =

Spanish artist

- Born: 1969 (age 56–57); Ponferrada, Spain
- Education: University of Salamanca; University of Kassel; Elisava
- Occupations: Artist; Illustrator; Publisher; Art director; Image director; DJ; Nightlife promoter; Interior decorator; Cultural manager
- Years active: 2000–present
- Known for: Drawing, collage, illustration
- Notable work: The Silvia Prada Art Book (2006); The New Modern Hair: A Styling Chart (2012); Tom (2017)

Silvia Prada (born 1969) is a Spanish artist based in New York City. Born in Ponferrada, she is known for graphite drawings and collages that rework pop-culture imagery, from advertising and fashion editorials to portraits of celebrities, into queer iconography. She began as a magazine illustrator in Barcelona, with commissions for publications such as The Face and Interview. Exhibited in galleries and museums internationally, she has also published artist's books, including The Silvia Prada Art Book (2006), The New Modern Hair: A Styling Chart (2012) and Tom (2017), made with the Tom of Finland Foundation. Her illustrations have been used in advertising campaigns such as Miu Miu's Fall Winter 2020. Her work is in the permanent collection of the MUSAC in León and the Museum of Contemporary Art Shanghai.

== Early life and education ==
Prada was born in Ponferrada, in the province of León, the daughter of a well-known hairdresser. She grew up in the family's men's hair salon in the 1980s, among the magazines left for customers, which she credits with shaping her interest in male beauty and androgyny. She has said that, as a child, she felt her identity did not fit anywhere, and that she was attracted to the homoerotic imagery in those magazines. She has also linked her sensitivity to scent to the salon, and collects soaps and vintage fragrance samples. She began collecting magazines and photography books at eighteen and has built an archive, including 1970s issues of Playgirl and Physique Pictorial, on which her work draws.

She studied fine arts at the University of Salamanca and holds a doctorate in visual communication from the University of Kassel, as well as a master's degree in design and public space from the Elisava school in Barcelona. In 1999 she received a scholarship to the Masterclasses of the 4th Biennial of European Academies of Visual Arts in Maastricht, where she attended workshops led by Juan Muñoz, Thomas Grünfeld, Lawrence Weiner and Richard Deacon, and she took a course on creation and technology at the Círculo de Bellas Artes in Madrid.

== Beginnings in Barcelona ==
Prada moved to Barcelona in 1992. She worked in an architects' office and then in the interior design departments of Zara and Mango, and has said that she turned to art after tiring of that work. As magazines devoted to youth culture appeared, she began working as an illustrator. According to Benzina, the gallery circuit had not fully opened to her early in her career, and illustration allowed her to work with more freedom than the orthodox art world demanded. To get noticed she sent publications a large-format artist's book in an edition of 100 copies; Interview and The Face were among those that contacted her.

Her graphite illustrations went on to appear in Dazed & Confused, BlackBook and Luis Venegas's Fanzine 137 among others. She also worked for Carlos, the in-flight magazine for Virgin Atlantic's Upper Class passengers, which was designed entirely with illustration. A 2009 municipal profile described her as a key figure in the return of illustration to fashion publishing at a time when photography dominated it. Her activity in Barcelona also included work as a DJ, with the photographer Leila Méndez, under the name Strength & Honour.

== Galleries and museums in Spain and abroad, 2005–2009 ==
In 2004 she took part in 25 Artists Interpret Fashion, a group exhibition at Deitch Projects in New York curated by the magazine BlackBook. The following year she presented two solo exhibitions in Spain. Hot or Not, in April, opened the programme of Laboratorio 987, the project space of the MUSAC in León, and was curated by Tania Pardo. All Things Pop, in July, was shown at the Centre d'Art Santa Mònica in Barcelona.

Between 2005 and 2007 she also showed at the ARCOmadrid fair with the Galeria Llucià Homs, and in 2006 she took part in group exhibitions at the Galeria Estrany–De la Mota in Barcelona and the Museo de Arte Carrillo Gil in Mexico City.

In 2007 she presented House of Pop at the Galeria Llucià Homs in Barcelona. The show was headed by a large graphite mural of Madonna on a Suprematist-inspired background, taken from a series in The Silvia Prada Art Book, and included five drawings on canvas of Madonna, Chloë Sevigny and people from the circle of Terry Richardson. Unlike her earlier shows, it combined a wall mural with drawings on canvas. She later told Wallpaper*:

People like Boy George, Madonna, all of these gender blender personas were really interesting to me. I really found my place in that kind of pop culture, which at the time wasn't called gay but really is. For me, all pop culture is gay culture.

— Silvia Prada, Wallpaper*, 2023

Her work travelled further in the following years: to Madrid and Paris in 2007 (Room Mate #1 at Galería Casado Santapau, and My 2007 at Colette), and to Shanghai in 2008, where her piece Fever was shown at the Art Lab of the MoCA. The Art Lab was a project developed to challenge the white cube space of the museum, with works made in relation to its architecture, such as paintings on walls and floors, or photography printed as wallpaper. Its first yearlong programme, on the theme Artificial Nature, began in April 2008 and was curated by Alicia Framis. Prada was among the artists, together with Sophie Calle, Ai Weiwei and Pipilotti Rist.

In 2009 she also exhibited in Madrid, Guanajuato and Buenos Aires.

== DJ sets and Club Tropicana ==
Prada organised Club Tropicana, a Thursday-night event that moved between venues in Barcelona, among them the Café Royale and, in 2010, Cabaret Berlin. Its guests included the actress Bimba Bosé and the designer David Delfín. In 2011 La Vanguardia cited her, as organiser of the Tropicana nights, as an example of the amateur DJs, among them designers, photographers and advertising professionals, who had replaced the professionals.

She also ran Who's The Boss, a Saturday-night party at Cabaret Berlin to which she invited friends, among them Mario Vaquerizo and Bruce LaBruce, to host their own sessions. The nights grew into Wonderprojects, a cultural management agency she founded with Frankie Morera, based between New York and Barcelona. Between 2012 and 2023 she organised or played at nights in Barcelona, London and New York, including a party at the Otto Zutz club with Rossy de Palma as DJ in 2012, a night at Dalston Superstore in 2013, and the club night Amante, which she started in New York in 2018.

== Move to New York and The New Modern Hair ==
Prada moved to New York in 2010, after meeting the musician Kim Ann Foxman, of the band Hercules and Love Affair. The two met in Barcelona just after the band's first album came out, at an event Prada was organising for Hercules magazine, where she had booked Foxman to play. Their collaboration also included the illustrations Prada made for Foxman's video "Creature".

Her first solo exhibition in the United States, The New Modern Hair, was held at the Pacific Design Center in Los Angeles from 18 January to 26 February 2013. Curated by Joakim Andréasson and produced by cultureEDIT, it grew out of her book of the same name. The book and its foldout poster used illustrations of male models taken from mid-twentieth-century barbershop posters, which the exhibition developed into large-scale drawings, murals and collages. Among the contributors were Marc Balet, Bruce LaBruce, Slava Mogutin, Collier Schorr and Holli Smith. Discussing the series, she told Nowness that she liked the idea of a secure, masculine, clean-cut alpha male who knows how to carry his hair, and that hair is something quite primal in terms of identity, especially with men, because it gives cues to character traits.

In 2015 she showed Generation X, portraits of teen idols of the 1980s and early 1990s, at Percy, a gallery in Oakland, California, from 3 April to 2 May. Diane Pernet, who described it as her first show in the Bay Area, wrote: "Her signature work is monochromatic nostalgia meets pop art manifestos. The work chronicles cultural iconography with the ardent reverence of a teen fan under her refined hand."

== Collaboration with the Tom of Finland Foundation ==
Prada has said that she first came across Tom of Finland in an Interview article. Joakim Andréasson, creative director of the Tom of Finland Store, introduced her to the Tom of Finland Foundation, and the collaboration produced Tom, an online exhibition of new drawings and collages and a book published by Capricious, based on Tom of Finland's reference scrapbooks. According to The Cut, she was the first woman to be given unlimited access to the foundation's archives. Prada said it was important to approach the material "through the vision of a woman." The book was launched on 22 February 2018 at Participant Inc in New York. At the launch, Michael Bullock, who contributed an essay to the book, told Artforum:

Silvia relocates the sensuality and style in work that is typically viewed as the cliché of ultra-macho masculinity, opening up an exciting dialogue about sexuality and focusing on what gay men and lesbians might share, what is universal.

— Michael Bullock, Artforum, 2018

Her drawings were shown at the foundation's TOM House in Los Angeles from 20 May to 18 June 2018. The foundation, which Tom of Finland founded with Durk Dehner in 1984, later included her work in AllTogether, an exhibition drawn from its permanent collection and organised with The Community in Venice in April 2022 and in Paris in May 2022, with the support of Diesel. It brought together around seventy artists, and The Community dates its relationship with the foundation to a visit to TOM House in 2018. In June 2023 her drawing Slow Kissing (2019), in pencil on paper, was shown in The AllTogether Clubhouse, the New York continuation of the exhibition, supported by Diesel.

== Fashion and advertising collaborations ==
Prada's illustration has also been used in fashion and advertising projects. In 2007 she contributed a design on friendship among men to Uniqlo's UT Inspired: Football T-shirt series. Six years later, her illustrations were used in the Spring/Summer 2013 campaign of the Italian label MSGM, photographed by Giampaolo Sgura. ONETSHIRT also released a collection of T-shirts, sweatshirts and bomber jackets with twelve of her portraits of Hollywood stars of the 1980s and 1990s, combined with comic-style onomatopoeia and geometric compositions.

In 2017 she customised Levi's Type III Trucker jacket for its fiftieth anniversary. The jackets, a limited edition of fifty sold at a Barcelona concept store, carried an embroidered version of her Pomeranian poster and patches taken from her drawings for Tom. Her work for that book reached fashion again in 2018, when the Swedish brand Eytys involved her in its capsule collection with the Tom of Finland Foundation, for which she interpreted Tom's world through a woman's eyes.

In 2020 her hand-drawn illustrations and animations were part of Miu Miu's Fall Winter 2020 campaign Close, art-directed by Katie Grand. The campaign was conceived as a set of visual studies on proximity: four photographers portrayed their closeness to their subjects, while Prada, Anthony Turner, Luella Bartley and Chantal Stracey contributed drawings and animations that interpreted the mood and details of the collection, and the material was assembled in cut-and-paste collages. In 2022 a collage of hers was printed on a shirt in the Pride capsule collection that Diesel released with the Tom of Finland Foundation.

== Magazine and book projects ==
Her first artist's book, an edition of 100 copies, which she describes as an edited portfolio, was made deliberately large, with Visionaire in mind because it conveyed luxury to her, and she sent it to the publications that interested her. It was followed in 2006 by The Silvia Prada Art Book, in which, as in her 2007 exhibition House of Pop, celebrities are set against backgrounds inspired by artists of the early twentieth century.

In 2010 she made Richard Gere on Fake Kandinsky (Pin-Up Poster), a one-colour screenprint, 87 × 120 cm, in a signed and numbered edition of 300. In 2012 she published The New Modern Hair: A Styling Chart with cultureEDIT, a homage to the barbershop that sets stylised portraits of male hairstyles against geometric drawings. Generation X (2015), an edition of 500 published in Brussels by Triangle Books, is a series of portraits of the teen idols of the 1980s and early 1990s, and the fourth in the publisher's series of artist books of black-and-white portraits. Tom, published by Capricious in 2017, gathers her pencil drawings after Tom of Finland's reference scrapbooks, with texts by Michael Bullock, Melissa Anderson and Aimee Goguen.

In 2019 Prada was among the contributors of quotes about Berlin to Peter Berlin: Icon, Artist, Photosexual, published by Damiani and edited by Michael Bullock. In October 2020 Interview reported that she was image director of the relaunched Playgirl, published by Jack Lindley Kuhns, for which she made a series of illustrations drawing on the magazine's archive from the 1970s onward; the relaunch issue was due on 26 October 2020. She said the magazine had been part of how she understood pop culture as a teenager, and that she collected it. In 2024 she contributed to issue 27 of A Magazine Curated By, guest-curated by Diesel's creative director Glenn Martens. That year she also directed the art and technical production of a series of nine covers for issue 37 of PIN–UP, each built as a physical assemblage in which carved wooden blocks replaced the magazine's typeset title.

== Obsessions and later work ==
In June and July 2023 Prada presented Obsessions at VISO Project in Dumbo, Brooklyn, with additional works by Coco Capitán. It included twelve pencil portraits of Princess Diana, collages that combined works by Picasso and Miró with Calvin Klein and Versace advertising and images from the 1970s gay men's clothing catalogue AH MEN, and a porcelain replica of the Obsession soap bar in an edition of thirty, her first sculpture. Prada described the concept of the show to WWD:

I wanted to put together a show with a lot of archives of things I have that built my lexicon as a queer female artist. All the culture that I have consumed since I was a teenager – what made me gay.

— Silvia Prada, WWD, 2023

That year Wallpaper* commissioned her to combine images from David Vance's The Ultimate Book of Nudes (1976) with lipsticks from fashion and beauty brands for its September issue. In 2024 she discussed her influences, including Calvin Klein's 1990s advertising and Princess Diana, in an interview for Lampoon. In 2025 she showed Brand Names at McGrath, a gallery of antique furniture, art and objects in Manhattan. The show centred on collages made from photographs by Bob Mizer, which New York magazine called "sexy", and also included charcoal drawings and lampshades she decorated for alabaster lamps by the designer Paul Morehouse. In 2026 Family Style included her among eight artists in a feature in its fall issue, with her work Missoni, Miró and Mel.

== Iconography and themes ==
Prada works mainly in graphite. Her early drawings portrayed figures from television, pornography and comics, among them Kylie Minogue, Britney Spears and Jennifer Lopez, and she has said she worked from photographs, including those of Mario Testino. She divided that early work into three groups, one related to rap, one to celebrities and one to erotica. A 2009 municipal profile described the drawings as precise and hyperrealist, noted their debt to Pop art, from Andy Warhol to Roy Lichtenstein's use of onomatopoeia, and observed that it is unclear whether they criticise or celebrate a society of ephemeral values. It added that her work draws on the underground aesthetic of MTV and an increasingly assimilated homoeroticism, and that it samples icons such as Madonna and Disney characters. Dazed included her drawing Madonna on Malevich among works by contemporary artists interpreting Madonna, published with its 2008 cover story on the singer. She said:

For me, Madonna has became [sic] even more important than any art movement in terms of history and popular culture

— Silvia Prada, Dazed, 2008

The portraits in The New Modern Hair, with titles such as The Flat Top and The Sportsman, evoke vintage barbershop imagery and are set against geometric drawings that rework Bauhaus, De Stijl and Russian Constructivism. Her works of 2003–2007 include portraits of Justin Timberlake, Macaulay Culkin, Terry Richardson, Chloë Sevigny, Madonna and Vincent Gallo, in charcoal on paper and pencil on canvas. She told Diario de León in 2013 that there is no high or low culture and no elitist art, only an elitist consumption of art, and that she tried to turn the obsessive visual world she drew on into a still life of almost classical character, giving it a different meaning.

Her later work is built on her archive of magazines, advertising and fashion editorials. Office described it as a collage in which images that are not explicitly queer become queer iconography through juxtaposition, and quoted her saying that she does not "need validation from men or women." Prada describes the work as almost political, a way to make viewers think about where the images they consume come from. She told Wallpaper*:

A Calvin Klein ad from the 1990s, like that for One [perfume], was already queer without calling it queer. So I feel like the message was way more strong in the 1990s and it feels much more powerful to me than a brand trying to put together a Pride campaign now. Looking back, you get all the power, energy, and soul much more strongly and I think new generations need to look at this and see that these images have a lot of layers.

— Silvia Prada, Wallpaper*, 2023

She has said that everything in her work is homoerotic and concerns gay culture, including her work on Tom of Finland and on Bob Mizer. The text for Obsessions describes her as archiving gender experimentation in music, fashion advertising and gay culture from the late 1980s and 1990s, and as queering male modernist artists by mixing their work with fashion advertising. Prada described the images she makes as a mood board of her own identity and of what she consumed in the 1990s. Those moments, she said, shaped her attractions to the world and her self-perception, including her sexuality and gender. Artforum described her drawings after Tom's collages as "delicate and androgynous." On Obsessions, she told W that gay culture had become "straight-washed" and that she wanted to reclaim a moment of queer history, while Artnet read the show as an encapsulation of the gay male mindset of the 1990s, quoting her: "My identity culturally is more of a gay man."

== Reception ==
Critics have often read Prada's work as a reflection of its time. Hannah Mandel, in Interview, described how since 2000 she had been combining "aspects of Pop Art, fashion illustration, and margin doodling" to produce "a style of flatly rendered graphite drawing," in which celebrities, models and musicians traced from magazine images hover over shapes and patterns that refer to early abstract painters. In 2007 Frederic Montornés interpreted it in Benzina as a portrait of the present and of what he called a gaseous and ethereal society. Christopher Harrity, in The Advocate, found that The New Modern Hair captured "the typecasting and idealized character building that has become ingrained in our minds through media, pop culture, and iconography."

Later coverage turned to how the work treats queer culture. In Office, David Eardley argued that her work reflects what the word "queer" has long meant, "other-ness, underground subculture, and transgression," and that in her art queerness becomes "something intimate and provocatively secret." Reviewing Obsessions in 2023, Kyle Munzenrieder wrote in W:

All together, it's a mélange of various markers of gay identity that may have been deeply coded or even inadvertent ... While the parade of yearly Pride campaigns may represent important political advancement and acceptance, in comparison the imagery Prada assembled in "Obsessions" reads strikingly more queer, even as it was all originally presented to a mainstream audience as well.

— Kyle Munzenrieder, W, 2023

In the text for the exhibition, Michael Bullock argued that her "instinct for sharp juxtapositions puts gay cultural achievements on an equal footing with some of the most canonical visual artists of all time," and that the work communicates "a relentless devotion to and reverence for" the transcendence that gay pop culture imagery has offered her. More recently, Bryan Martin summed up her work in Family Style:

Prada's work extends beyond the boundaries of fine art, encompassing beautiful black-and-white illustrations that blend fashion, book- and zine-making, photography, and advertising. ... But Prada isn't making a cheap callback to bygone closeted days; rather, she is noting a deep appreciation for an aesthetic history that should be remembered with reverence.

— Bryan Martin, Family Style, 2026

== Books ==
- Silvia Prada (limited edition of 100 copies).
- The Silvia Prada Art Book (BPA, Barcelona, 2006). Edited by Oihana Iturbide. 36 pp. ISBN 8460998347.
- The New Modern Hair: A Styling Chart (cultureEDIT, 2012). Edited by Joakim Andréasson. 32 pp. ISBN 978-0-615-66610-5.
- Generation X (Triangle Books, 2015). 48 pp. ISBN 978-2-930777-10-8.
- Tom (Capricious Publishing, New York, 2017). 44 pp. ISBN 978-0-9974446-4-3.

== Exhibitions ==
- 1994: Uno cada uno (group), Galería Juana de Aizpuru, Madrid
- 1996: 8ª Primavera Fotográfica de Cataluña (group), Can Felipa, Barcelona
- 2003: Paper Chic, Círculo de Bellas Artes, Madrid; V Convocatoria de Jóvenes Artistas, Galería Luis Adelantado, Valencia
- 2004: Edad perversa, Galería Horrach Moyà, Mallorca; BlackBook, Deitch Projects, New York
- 2005: Hot or Not (solo), Laboratorio 987, MUSAC, León; All Things Pop (solo), Centre d'Art Santa Mònica, Barcelona; Skills (group), Galeria Llucià Homs, Barcelona
- 2005–2007: ARCO, Madrid, with Galeria Llucià Homs
- 2006: Cavalier Book Project, Nog Gallery, London; World Painting (group), Galeria Estrany de la Mota, Barcelona; Próximamente, Museo de Arte Contemporáneo Carrillo Gil, Mexico City
- 2007: House of Pop, Galeria Llucià Homs, Barcelona; Room Mate #1, Galería Casado Santapau, Madrid; My 2007, Colette, Paris; Existencias (group), MUSAC, León
- 2008: Fever, Art Lab, MoCA, Shanghai
- 2009: Pin up War (solo), Galería Casado Santapau, Madrid; Give It Up, Galería Casado Santapau, Madrid; Let's Get Busy, Galería Jesús Gallardo, Guanajuato; Huéspedes, Museo Nacional de Bellas Artes, Buenos Aires
- 2011: Dean Sameshima & Co (group), Galería Casado Santapau, Madrid; Grafika (group), Instituto Cervantes, Madrid; Cruised or to be Cruised (group), Galería Casado Santapau, Madrid; Zona Maco Art Fair (group), Mexico City
- 2013: The New Modern Hair (solo), Pacific Design Center, Los Angeles
- 2015: Generation X, Percy, Oakland
- 2018: Silvia Prada at TOM House, Tom of Finland Foundation, Los Angeles; Antifurniture (group), Fortnight Institute
- 2022: AllTogether (group), Venice and Paris
- 2023: Obsessions (solo, with Coco Capitán), VISO Project, Brooklyn; The AllTogether Clubhouse (group), New York
- 2025: Brand Names, McGrath, New York
- 2026: La palabra pintada II (group), Instituto Leonés de Cultura, Casa de Cultura, Villablino; Anotaciones a la colección de arte del ILC (group), Instituto Leonés de Cultura, Centro del Clima, La Vid de Gordón

== Collections ==
Prada's work is in the permanent collection of the MUSAC in León, which holds five of her drawings, portraits of Tom Ford, Kate Moss, Eminem, Pharrell and Robbie Williams, and by 2019 she had taken part in five exhibitions at the museum. Her work was also included in AllTogether, an exhibition drawn from the permanent collection of the Tom of Finland Foundation. The MoCA Shanghai has also acquired her work, and works by her are on display on the museum's third floor, in the space formerly known as the Art Lab. It is also in the collection of the Instituto Leonés de Cultura of the Diputación de León, which has shown it in group exhibitions such as La palabra pintada II in Villablino (April 2026) and Anotaciones a la colección de arte del ILC in La Vid de Gordón (May 2026).

== Personal life ==
Prada moved to New York for love, in 2010; she has said that she and her partner, the musician Kim Ann Foxman, are separated but still married and remain close friends. She identifies as a lesbian.
