= Pin-Up (magazine) =

Architecture and design magazine

Pin–Up (stylized as PIN–UP) is a biannual independent architecture and design magazine based in New York City. The magazine's subtitle is The Magazine for Architectural Entertainment, and it covers a range of highbrow and lowbrow topics across fashion, art, politics, architecture, and design. Pin–Up was founded in 2006 by architect, curator, and creative director Felix Burrichter, who currently serves as its creative director.

== History ==
=== Founding and Early Issues ===
The first issue launched in 2006 with a cover story featuring Rick Owens' house, displaying his furniture designs to the public for the first time. It also included interviews with Zaha Hadid, Daniel Arsham, and Romanian dictator Nicolae Ceaușescu.

Burrichter credited his internship at Butt magazine in Amsterdam under Jop van Bennekom and Gert Jonkers (of Fantastic Man) as an inspiration to create a new kind of magazine that loosened up the image of the "architect as genius."

Each issue of Pin–Up has a theme, such as "Post-Normal," "Flamboyant Restraint," and "Bourgeois Shenanigans," as well as city-focused issues on Los Angeles, Berlin, and Milan. Over the years, it has featured interviews with prominent architects and designers, including Frank Gehry, Rem Koolhaas, Maria Pergay, Paulo Mendes da Rocha, Martino Gamper, and Ettore Sottsass.

=== Editorial Leadership and Art Direction ===
Designer Erin Knuston was named art director of the magazine in 2015. In the summer of 2020, Benjamin Ganz succeeded her as art director.

From September 2021 to February 2024, Emmanuel Olunkwa was named editor of the magazine, succeeding its founder, Felix Burrichter. His first issue under his editorial leadership was titled Radical Optimism.

=== Milestones ===
For its 30th issue, celebrating 15 years of publication, Pin–Up covered topics such as the "new" New York designers, the impact of social media on home decorating, and the Milanese underground signage by Bob Noorda, Franca Helg, and Franco Albini.

In fall 2024, Pin–Up published its 37th edition, guest-edited by Swiss architecture curators Fredi Fischli and Niels Olsen, directors of gta exhibitions at ETH Zürich’s Institute for the History and Theory of Architecture.

== Publications ==
=== Books ===
- PIN–UP Interviews (PowerHouse Books, 2013) – A collection of over fifty conversations and interviews featured in Pin–Up since 2006. The 448-page book contains no pictures and includes subjects such as architects Odile Decq and Charles Renfro, fashion designers Rick Owens and Hedi Slimane, and artists Daniel Arsham and Robert Wilson.
- Barbie Dreamhouse: An Architectural Survey (Mattel Creations, 2022) – A limited-run art book co-published by PIN–UP and Mattel in celebration of the Barbie Dreamhouse's 60-year anniversary. The 151-page monograph follows Barbie's Dreamhouses across six iterations, including furnishings and architectural blueprints. It was co-authored by Felix Burrichter, Whitney Mallett, and Ben Ganz.
