= Margo Grant Walsh =

American interior designer

Margo Grant Walsh is an American interior designer also known as a collector of silver serving pieces. As a designer of workplaces, first for Skidmore, Owings & Merrill and later for Gensler, her clients included companies such as Goldman Sachs, Pennzoil, and Shearman & Sterling. Grant was inducted into the Interior Design magazine Hall of Fame in 1987, and has been described by the IIDA as "one of the most powerful and influential women in American architecture and interior design", and a pioneer for both women in the field and the profession itself.

Grant began her career in the San Francisco office of design firm Skidmore, Owings & Merrill, at the time the world's largest architecture firm, where she quickly rose through the ranks to become the top executive in the firm's growing interiors practice. She later took a position with Gensler and Associates in 1973, eventually becoming one of its vice presidents. Since retirement in 2004, Walsh has spent her time curating her extensive silver collection.

== Early life and education ==
Marjolaine (Margo) Grant Walsh was born in 1936 to Alfred and Ann Grant on the Blackfeet Indian Reservation in Fort Peck, Montana. Her father was a Chippewa, and her mother of Scottish origin. Shortly after her birth, the Grants moved to the Turtle Mountain Indian Reservation in Belcourt, North Dakota, a Chippewa Indian reservation near the Canadian border where Grant spent her childhood. After the start of World War II, the Grant family moved to the Portland, Oregon area, to assist in the war effort at the Kaiser Shipyards. After high school, Grant took courses at the Portland Art Museum, which she later credited as sparking her interest in making a career in interior design. She graduated from the University of Oregon summa cum laude with a Bachelor of Science in 1959 and a Bachelor of Interior Architecture in 1960.

On 20 February 1994, Margo Grant married John Perry Walsh, becoming Margo Grant Walsh, at St. Patrick's Cathedral in Manhattan, NY. Walsh was a class of 1950 Yale graduate with an MBA from New York University, who worked as a private investor and former president of Florence Walsh Fashions Inc., his late mother's company. He died of cancer in 1998.

== Professional career ==
=== Skidmore, Owings & Merrill ===
Post-graduation, Walsh went to work for the Herman Miller furnishing and furniture design firm, where she met Alexis Yermakov who was then setting up the interior design department of Skidmore, Owings & Merrill's San Francisco office. Yermakov recruited her to work at SOM. While there, she worked closely with Davis Allen, then head of SOM interior architecture and design. One of their notable collaborative projects was the Mauna Kea Beach Hotel Hawaii. Walsh spent thirteen years at SOM in San Francisco, eventually becoming associate director of interior design. Initially the firm's partners were hesitant to pursue interiors design and architecture projects as a separate practice and only sought to do such work in buildings designed by SOM. Walsh is credited with convincing them to more aggressively market their interiors studio.

=== Gensler and Associates ===
In 1973 Walsh was hired by Arthur Gensler to work for his corporate interior design firm Gensler and Associates. When she first spoke with Art Gensler, the firm, which eventually became the largest interiors firm in the world, only had three employees. She became Director of Interior Design in their Houston office with a staff of 35. In 1979 she opened Gensler's New York City offices, where she was promoted to managing principal of the eastern region division. Later, she opened offices in Washington D.C. and Boston, as well as London in 1988. Before leaving Gensler in 2004, Ms. Walsh became one of four on the board of directors, and the company had grown to a staff of nearly 2,000 by the time of her departure.

=== Interior Architecture/Design Projects ===
- Marine Midland Bank Building was completed in 1967 as one of her earliest projects at Skidmore, Owings & Merrill.
- Walsh's most notable project of her early career at Skidmore, Owings & Merrill was the 1969 construction of the Bank of America (555 California St.) headquarters in San Francisco.
- While in Houston, TX with Gensler and Associates, Walsh worked on the team to design the interior of Pennzoil Place.

== Silver Collection ==
After her retirement from Gensler in 2004, Walsh focused on her collection of twentieth century silver and metalware, which she started in 1981. Grant collected pieces made by Josef Hoffmann, Charles Robert Ashbee, Henri van der Velde, William Spratling, Robert Seigel, Gio Ponti and many more. With over 800 pieces, it includes silverware, serving dishes, trays, jewelry objets de vertu from the United States, England, Mexico, and Europe. It is one of the largest such collections in private hands in the world. Walsh's "Collecting by Design" exhibition displayed over 450 pieces in 40 showcases and has been featured in 11 museum exhibitions since 2002, in locations from New York to San Francisco.

== Awards ==
- In 1987 Margo Grant Walsh was inducted into the Interior Design Hall of Fame.
- The University of Oregon honored Walsh in 2001 when the School of Architecture and Allied Arts announced the establishment of the Margo Grant Walsh Professorship in Interior Architecture.
- In 2002 the University of Oregon awarded Margo Grant Walsh the Ellis F. Lawrence Medal – the highest honor of the School of Architecture and Allied Arts.

== Bibliography ==
- Abercrombie, Stanley. "What They're Reading.." Interior Design 76, no. 10 (August 2005): 201. Academic Search Premier, EBSCOhost (accessed 29 September 2016).
- Gans, Jennifer Cross. "Collecting By Design: Silver & Metalwork of the Twentieth Century From the Margo Grant Walsh Collection." Metalsmith 28, no. 2 (June 2008): 48. Academic Search Premier, EBSCOhost (accessed 29 September 2016).
- Slavin, Maeve. "Davis Allen: 40 Years of Interior Design at Skidmore, Owings & Merrill." Rizzoli, 1990. ISBN 978-0847812554.
