= Beatrice Galilee =

British architecture curator and writer

- Born: 1982 (age 43–44) London
- Occupation: Curator; Writer; Founder
- Subject: Architecture; Design; Climate
- Notable works: Radical Architecture of the Future

Website
- beatricegalilee.com

Beatrice Galilee (born 1982) is a British curator and international writer on design and architecture. She is the co-founder and executive director of The World Around, and the author of Radical Architecture of the Future.

From 2006 to 2009 Galilee was the architecture editor of Icon Magazine, and from 2010 to 2013 a contributing editor to Domus. She was the chief curator of the 2013 Lisbon Architecture Triennale, co-curator of the 2011 Gwangju Design Biennale, and a co-curator of the 2009 Shenzhen Hong Kong Bi-City Biennale of Architecture and Urbanism; from 2010 to 2012 she ran The Gopher Hole, a temporary exhibition space in London. Beginning in 2014, Galilee was the first curator of architecture at the Metropolitan Museum of Art. She left the organisation in 2019 to co-found The World Around, a design conference about architecture's "now, near, and next". In 2021 she published Radical Architecture of the Future with Phaidon Press.

== Education and teaching ==
Galilee graduated in architecture at the University of Bath, where she was head of the architecture society and initially failed her second year. She received an MSc in Architecture History from the Bartlett School of Architecture in 2011. She is a visiting professor at the Pratt Institute, teaching a course on curation in public space, and has lectured at Central Saint Martins.

== Writing ==
Galilee was the architecture editor of Icon magazine from 2006 to 2009. She was the lead editor of 2009's issue "Architecture Without Buildings", presenting architects and spatial practitioners whose work is less defined by the single built project, and is "difficult to categorise neatly". After leaving Icon she continued writing on architecture as a regular contributor to Domus magazine until 2013; and has written for e-Flux, the RIBA Journal, and Art Review among others.

In 2021, Phaidon Press published Galilee's Radical Architecture of the Future, which presents contemporary architecture and design projects from across the world as well as photo essays. It was presented and reviewed in various publications, with Jonathan Bell describing it as "a book to challenge preconceptions and expand horizons" in Wallpaper* magazine.

== Curation ==
Galilee's curatorial career began as a co-curator at the Shenzhen Hong Kong Bi-City Biennale of Architecture and Urbanism in 2009, and at the Gwangju Design Biennale in 2011. She has gone on to curate many more architecture festivals, events, and conferences.

=== The Gopher Hole ===
Between 2010 and 2012 Galilee co-founded and curated the Gopher Hole, an informal exhibition space beneath a bar in Hoxton, London. In an interview with Icon magazine, Galilee said of the gallery's approach that “The concept of architecture as something that begins and ends with the design of a building is something that we basically disagree with." In 2011 the Gopher Hole hosted an exhibition of responses to Domus magazine's "Project Heracles", which crowd-sourced ideas, each outlined on a postcard, about an imagined infrastructure to connect Europe and Africa.

=== 2013 Lisbon Architecture Triennale ===
In 2013 Galilee was the curator of the Lisbon Architecture Triennale, which sought to engender "a real sense of urgency for a... more critical design" and, after a 50% budget cut during a financial crisis in Portugal, received mixed reviews. Oliver Wainwright, the architecture critic for The Guardian, asked if the show was "all a bit too irreverent". Galilee defended her curatorial decisions in an interview with Dezeen after influential Portuguese architect Álvaro Siza reportedly snubbed the event, saying "It's an event for the next generations of architects in Portugal not for established practitioners. We didn't really compromise on that."

=== Hacked and Afrofuture at la Rinascente ===
At the 2012 Milan Design Week, Galilee curated "Hacked", which, for 100 hours, turned la Rinascente's flagship department store into a public architectural laboratory, with contributions from Carmody Groarke and EXYZT among others. Galilee's use of the la Rinascente store continued in 2013 with "Afrofuture", an exhibition with talks, debates, workshops, from leading voices in African design.

=== Architecture curator at the Metropolitan Museum of Art ===
Between 2014 and 2019 Galilee was the first curator of architecture at the Met.

During her tenure, Galilee was noted for commission rooftop installations by Cornelia Parker ("PsychoBarn", a red barn structure influenced by the Alfred Hitchcock film "Psycho") and Adrían Villa Rojas. The installations attracted large audiences and were critically acclaimed.

Galilee also convened a popular series of one-day conferences at the Met, under the title "In Our Time: A Year of Architecture in a Day", for architects, artists, curators, and writers from across the field of art and design. Reviewing the third and final edition in Artforum, Tatum Dooley praised "the imaginativeness and diversity of the projects chosen [under] the curatorial vision" of Galilee, but wrote that "the large demand of the event makes me wonder if it would be better spread out over a weekend." The conference format Galilee developed at the Met would soon be translated to The World Around.

== The World Around ==
After leaving the Met, Galilee co-founded The World Around, a global design conference by the slogan "Architecture's Now, Near, and Next", where she is the chief curator and executive director. The platform hosts regular summits in a format similar to that which Galilee developed for "A Year of Architecture in a Day" at the Met, partnering with institutions including the Solomon R. Guggenheim Museum and Het Nieuwe Instituut.

In 2022 The World Around announced the Young Climate Prize, offering mentorship to 25 climate designers between the ages of 13 and 25. The mentoring program will include former The World Around speakers and other designers, curators, writers and artists, including the UN special envoy for International Water Affairs, Henk Ovink, and multimedia artist David O'Reilly.
