= Hugi (surname) =

Hugi is a surname. Notable people with the surname include:

- Anita Hugi (born 1975), Swiss author
- Dor Hugi (born 1995), Israeli footballer
- Franz Joseph Hugi (1791–1855), Swiss geologist and teacher
- Hans Hügi (1926–2000), Swiss footballer
- Ofer Hugi (born 1964), Israeli politician
- Urs Hugi (born 1952), Swiss modern pentathlete
