= Beyto =

2020 Swiss film

- Directed by: Gitta Gsell
- Written by: Gitta Gsell; Yusuf Yesilöz
- Based on: Hochzeitsflug by Yusuf Yesilöz
- Produced by: Louis Mataré; Magdalena Welter; David Fonjallaz; Peter Zwierko
- Starring: Burak Ates; Dimitri Stapfer; Ecem Aydin; Beren Tuna
- Cinematography: Peter Guyer
- Edited by: Bernhard Lehner
- Music by: Ben Jeger
- Production companies: Lomotion AG; Sulaco Film GmbH
- Release date: 25 September 2020 (ZFF)
- Running time: 98 minutes
- Country: Switzerland
- Languages: Swiss German; Turkish

Beyto is a 2020 Swiss drama film directed by Gitta Gsell. Adapted from Yusuf Yesilöz’s novel Hochzeitsflug, it stars Burak Ates as a young Swiss man of Turkish background who falls in love with his coach and is then pushed by his family into an arranged marriage. The film premiered at the Zurich Film Festival in 2020 and later won the Prix du Public at the 2021 Solothurn Film Festival.

== Synopsis ==
Beyto, the son of Turkish immigrants in Switzerland, is a talented swimmer and apprentice whose life is upended when he falls in love with his coach Mike. His parents respond by taking him to their home village and arranging a marriage to Seher, a childhood friend, leaving him caught in a love triangle.

== Cast ==
The cast includes:

- Burak Ates as Beyto
- Dimitri Stapfer as Mike
- Ecem Aydin as Seher
- Beren Tuna as Narin
- Serkan Tastemur as Seyit
- Zeki Bulgurcu as Metin

== Production ==
The film was adapted by Gitta Gsell from Yusuf Yesilöz’s novel Hochzeitsflug, bringing the source material into a contemporary setting.

== Reception ==
=== Awards ===
The film won the Prix du Public at the 2021 Solothurn Film Festival. Dimitri Stapfer was also nominated for Best Performance in a Supporting Role at the 2021 Swiss Film Award.

=== Critical response ===
In a review for SRF, Beyto was praised for its multilingual realism, its sympathetic treatment of the main characters, and its portrayal of contemporary Switzerland. Filmdienst described the film as a sensitively directed romantic comedy that addresses social tensions through the story of three young people. In Basler Zeitung, the film was described as prompting reflection on the pressures surrounding coming out, while praising the performances of Burak Ates and Dimitri Stapfer. In WOZ Die Wochenzeitung, the film was described as briskly told and praised for its dialogue and use of Swiss German and Turkish, though the review found it lacking in depth.

== Festival screenings ==
The film premiered at the 16th Zurich Film Festival in September 2020 and was also screened at the 56th Solothurn Film Festival in 2021.
