= Heinz Peter =

Heinz Peter may refer to:

- Heinz Günthardt (born 1959), also known as Heinz Peter Günthardt, a Swiss tennis player
- Heinz Peter Knes (born 1969), German photographer
- Heinz Peter Platter (born 1967), Italian alpine skier
- Heinz-Peter Thül (born 1963), German professional golfer
- Heinz-Peter Überjahn (born 1948), German football manager

== See also ==
- Hinzpeter, a surname
