= Ben Wu =

Ben Wu may refer to:

- Ben Wu (entertainer), Taiwanese singer, actor and TV personality
- Ben Wu (interior designer), Chinese interior designer
