= Manon (artist) =

- Born: 1940 (age 84–85); Bern, Switzerland

Manon (born Rosmarie Küng in 1940) is a Swiss artist. She produces installations, performances and photography. She first came to prominence in the 1974 with the installation The Salmon coloured boudoir. Her environments and photographic scenes are distillations of social change in the 1970s, sexual liberation, and the search for new roles. In photographic series such as Woman with shaved head and Ball of lonelinesses she addresses among other things the social construction of identity.

She has been awarded several prizes, including the 2008 Meret Oppenheim Prize.

== Biography ==
Manon was born in Bern, Switzerland. In 1972 she opened her boutique, Manon’s, in the old part of Zürich where she sold her own creations: jackets made from glitter fabric with appliqués. She posed in self designed interiors as a model for fashion magazines. In 1973 and 1974 Manon experimented for the first time in photography, creating Polaroids, and 'Fetischbilder' (Fetish Pictures). She was submerged in Zürich's subculture during this time, meeting the artists Sigmar Polke, Jürgen Klauke, Luciano Castelli, Markus Raetz, Walter Pfeiffer, and Esther Altdorfer, filmmaker Daniel Schmid, and musician Stefan Wittwer.

Her 1974 meticulously furnished bedroom in a loft on Augustinergasse in Zürich presents a little universe filled with fetish objects, feathers, and glittery materials, and would become the starting point for her first installation 'Das lachsfarbene Boudoir' (The salmon coloured boudoir) at the art gallery Li Tobler. It was reconstructed in 2006 and thereafter shown at the Migros Museum für Gegenwartskunst, at the Helmhaus in 2008 and the Swiss Institute for Contemporary Art in New York City in 2009.

A monograph on her work and career was published in 2008. Titled Manon, A Person: A Swiss Pioneer of Body and Performance Art, the book covers the range of her work from the 1970s onward.

== Performances ==
- In 1975 her performance 'Das Ende der Lola Montez' (for Markus Raetz) was shown at the Kunstmuseum Luzern)
- 'Manonomanie' (Artist's book)
- 1975/76 'Das Leben im Schaukasten' (Life in a Showcase at Pablo Stähli Gallery)
- 1976 'Manon Presents Man' (Performance at Gallery Jamileh Weber Zürich))
- 1977 'The Artist Is Present' (Performance at the Rathaus Lucerne)
- 'Walk on the Wild Side' (Performance at the Kunsthaus Zürich)
- 'Le regret, le désir' (Performance for Walter Pfeiffer)
- 'On Manon ’74-77' (Artist's book)
- 1977/78 'La dame au crane rasé' (The Lady with the Shaved Head) (Photoseries)
- 1978 'Elektrokardiogramm 304/303' (Photoseries)
- 1979 'Die graue Wand oder 36 schlaflose Nächte' (The gray wall or 36 sleepless nights) (Photoseries)
- 'Sentimental Journey' (Performance at Gallerie De Appel Amsterdam)
- 'Traps' (Performance at John Armleders Gallerie Ecart, Geneva)

== Photo and installation works ==
- 1980 'Ball der Einsamkeiten' (Ball of lonelinesses) (Photoseries)
- 1982 'Das Doppelzimmer' (The double-room) (Photoseries)
- 1983/84 'Wendekreise' (Turning circles) (Photoseries)
- 1990 'Damenzimmer' (The room of women) (Installation at Kusthaus St. Gall)
- 'Künstler Eingang' (Artist's entrance) (Photoseries)
- 1993 'Die Philosophie im Boudoir' (Philosophy in the boudoir) (Installation)
- 1994 'Wege zum Ruhm' (Paths to glory) (Artist's book)
- 1996'La stanza delle donne' (The room of women) (Installation)
- 1997 'Seduzione e dolore' (Seduction and pain) (Installation at Centro d'arte contemporaneo Bellinzona)
- 'Blut im Schuh' (Blood in the shoe) (Installation at Müllerhaus Lenzburg)
- 1999 'Forever Young' (Photoseries)
- 2003 'Einst war sie Miss Rimini' (She was once Miss Rimini) (Photoseries)
- 2006 'Manon as Edgar' (Photowork)
- Since 2004 photo cycle 'Diaries' (Photowork)
- 2008 'Borderline' (Photoseries)

== Exhibitions ==
- 2009 Swiss Institute, New York

== Books ==
- On Manon '74-77 (Küng Kong Sisters Zürich 1977, Reprint Neue Kunst und Medienverlag, Zürich, 2001)
- Manon - Identität Selbstdarstellung Image (Benteli-Verlag, Bern, 1981)
- Künstler Eingang (Benteli-Verlag, Bern, 1990)
- Einst war sie Miss Rimini / She once was Miss Rimini (Scheidegger&Spiess, Zürich, 2004)
- Manon - eine Person / Manon - A Person (Scheidegger&Spiess, Zürich, 2008)

== Catalogues ==
- The Artist is present (1977)
- Ball der Einsamkeiten (1980)
- Forever Young (Bianca Pilat contemporary art, Chicago-Milan, 1999)
