= Simon Castets =

French art curator

- Born: 1984 (age 41–42); Caen, France
- Education: Columbia University - MA in Curatorial Studies; Sciences Po, Paris - MA in Cultural Management

Simon Castets (b. Caen, France, 1984) is a French-American curator and since January 2026, the Executive Director of the Keith Haring Foundation. Located in New York City, the Foundation has been advancing Haring's artistic and philanthropic legacy since 1989, providing grants for youth services, arts education, and HIV/AIDS care. Previously, he served as the Director of Strategic Initiatives at LUMA Arles, France, where he spearheaded key institutional partnerships as well as innovation-focused commissions with artists including Shahryar Nashat, Rachel Rose, Sara Sadik, and Neil Beloufa, and curated an expanded version of the Getty Research Institute’s Sensing the Future: Experiments in Art and Technology. From 2013 to 2021, he was the Director of Swiss Institute, New York, where the curatorial approach focused on the inaugural institutional exhibitions of then-emerging or under-recognized artists, including Heidi Bucher, Jill Mulleady, Julien Nguyen, Niele Toroni, and Sandra Mujinga. He holds an MA in curatorial studies from Columbia University, New York, and an MA in Culture & Media Management from Sciences Po, Paris. He sits on the board of the Ballet National de Marseille and is an advisor to The World Around, the Tsai Foundation, and AFIELD.

== Career ==
In addition to projects and exhibitions at LUMA Arles and Swiss Institute, curatorial work includes the 2018 Samdani Art Award for the Dhaka Art Summit; Americans 2017 at LUMA Foundation, Zurich, together with Hans Ulrich Obrist (2017, as a part of 89plus; Rachel Rose at Aspen Art Museum, (2016); Poetry will be made by all! at LUMA Foundation and Moderna Museet, Stockholm, also with Hans Ulrich Obrist (2014); and Champs Elysées at Palais de Tokyo, Paris, with Julie Boukobza and Nicola Trezzi (2013). Following the 2013 Digital Life Design conference, Castets and Obrist launched 89plus, a research project that sought to platform artists born in, or after, 1989, the year when the World Wide Web was introduced. Castets also regularly contributes to catalogues and periodicals and frequently participates in panels and juries internationally. Under the leadership of Daniel Birnbaum, he served on the jury for the 2017 Absolut Art Award, which was given to Anne Imhof and Huey Copeland.

== Publications ==
SInce 1986 by Simon Castets (Editor, Author), Karen Marta (Editor), Mary Staniszewski (Author), Laura McLean-Ferris (Author) Co-published with Swiss Institute and Koenig Books, London, 2019.

Jeremy Shaw Christine Macel (Editor) and Simon Castets (Editor). With contributions by Simon Castets, Nora M. Khan, Christine Macel, Laura McLean-Ferris and Monika Szewczyk. Published by Centre Pompidou, Paris and Swiss Institute, New York, 2020.

PAVILLON DE L’ESPRIT NOUVEAU: A 21st Century Show Home Texts by Carson Chan, Trish Goff, Marc Matchak, Shawn Maximo. Felix Burrichter (Editor), Simon Castets (Editor), Karen Marta (Editor). Published by Swiss Institute / Karma, New York.

David Weiss: Works, 1968-1979 Karen Marta (Editor), Simon Castets (Editor). Text by Douglas Fogle, Urs Lüthi, Hans Ulrich Obrist, David Weiss. Published by Swiss Institute / Karma, New York.

The St. Petersburg Paradox Karen Marta (Editor), Simon Castets (Editor). Text by Ericka Beckman, A.E. Benenson, Walter Benjamin, Fredric Brandt, Vitalik Buterin, Alex Mackin Dolan, Hugh Scott Douglas, Cooper Francis, Sam Frank, Konstantin Genin, Remco Heesen, Nicolas Langlitz, Scott Lyall, Tabor Robak, Ben Schumacher, Emily Segal, Amalia Ulman, Douglas Wilson, Eric Zimmerman. Published by Swiss Institute / Karma, New York.

Heidi Bucher Karen Marta (Editor), Simon Castets (Editor). Text by Indigo Bucher, Mayo Bucher, Bice Curiger, Heike Munder, Beatrix Ruf, Christian Scheidemann, Philip Ursprung. Published by Swiss Institute / Karma, New York.

Allyson Vieira: The Plural Present Karen Marta (Editor), Simon Castets (Editor). Text by Joe Fyfe, Amelia Groom, William Hanley, Adam Szymczyk. Published by Swiss Institute / Kunsthalle Basel / Karma, New York.
