= Interiors (magazine) =

American interior design magazine

Interiors was an American interior design magazine. It began publication in 1888 as The Upholsterer and was shuttered in 2001.
