= Walter Pfeiffer =

Swiss photographer (born 1946)

- Born: 1946 (age 79–80); Beggingen, Switzerland
- Occupations: Photographer; artist; painter
- Years active: 1970–present
- Website: walterpfeiffer.com

Walter Pfeiffer (born in Beggingen in 1946) is a Swiss artist.

== Life and career ==
Walter Pfeiffer was born in Beggingen (Switzerland), in 1946 and has been producing since the early 1970s. His portraits of friends, lovers and the youth surrounding him in cities such as Zurich, Paris and New York would link him to other photographers of that decade, such as Nan Goldin and Nobuyoshi Araki. His first book of photographs, Walter Pfeiffer: 1970-1980 (Elke Betzel, 1980), appeared in 1980. The next two decades were spent in relative obscurity, while the photographer kept on producing his photography and a few videos, while at the same time returning to painting. The breakthrough and rediscovery of his work would have to wait until the beginning of the century, when Welcome Aboard, Photographs 1980-2000 (Edition Patrick Frey/Scab, 2001) was published. His work was then linked to the revival of realistic photography in the 1990s and early 2000s, with artists such as Wolfgang Tillmans, Ryan McGinley, Slava Mogutin, Heinz Peter Knes and Jack Pierson. His influence on the work of photographers like Juergen Teller has been noted. Since then, Walter Pfeiffer has collaborated with international magazines as diverse in style and audience as i-D, Butt and Vogue.

Artist Rep agency New Art Corps represents Walter Pfeiffer for image licensing and advertising.

== Publications ==
His first book of photographs, Walter Pfeiffer: 1970–1980, was published in 1980, followed a few years later by The eyes, the thoughts, ceaselessly wandering (Nachbar der Welt, 1986), but raised little attention. His work would only garner an international audience after the publication of Welcome Aboard, Photographs 1980–2000, in 2001. Since then, three new books have followed, released by international publishing houses such as Hatje Cantz and Steidl, including Night and Day (Hatje Cantz, 2007), Walter Pfeiffer: In Love with Beauty (Steidl, 2009) and Cherchez la femme!, also in 2009.

== Exhibitions ==
Walter Pfeiffer has had solo exhibitions at Kunsthaus Zurich (1982); Kunsthalle Basel (1986); Centre Culturel Suisse, Paris (2004); Swiss Institute New York (2022) and Kunstmuseum Luzern (2023). In 2008, Fotomuseum Winterthur presented In Love with Beauty, an unprecedented chronological overview of his work, spanning four decades from his beginnings in the early 1970s to his most recent work. An exhibition catalogue published by Steidl marked the event. Group exhibitions include Zurcher Kunstler, Kunsthaus Zurich (1973); Transformer: Askpete der Travestie, Kunstmuseum Luzern (1974); Swiss Video, Tate Modern, London (2006); Another Kind of Life: Photography on the Margins, Barbican Gallery, London (2018); amongst many others.

== Models ==
Walter Pfeiffer has stated in interviews that he prefers to work with non-professionals. His casting is usually done by himself, friends and a few assistants, often approaching subjects in the street. However, in the past few years, due to his work in the fashion industry, Pfeiffer has also photographed professional models such as Cara Delevingne, Karlie Kloss, Magdalena Frackowiak, Eva Herzigová, Francisco Lachowski and Lorcan Leather-Barrow.

== Books ==
- Walter Pfeiffer: 1970–1980 (Elke Betzel, 1980).
- The eyes, the thoughts, ceaselessly wandering (Nachbar der Welt, 1986).
- Welcome Aboard, Photographs 1980–2000 (Edition Patrick Frey/Scab, 2001).
- Night and Day (Hatje Cantz, 2007).
- Walter Pfeiffer: In Love with Beauty (Steidl, 2009).
- Cherchez la femme! (Edition Patrick Frey, 2009).
- Walter Pfeiffer: Scrapbooks, 1969–1985 (Edition Patrick Frey, 2012)
- Walter Pfeiffer: Bildrausch. Drawings, 1966–2018 (Edition Patrick Frey, 2018)
- Chez Walti 2000–2022 (Edition Patrick Frey, 2023)
