= Hinzpeter =

Hinzpeter is a surname. Notable people with the surname include:

- Georg Ernst Hinzpeter (1827–1907), German pedagogue
- Jürgen Hinzpeter (1937–2016), German journalist
- Rodrigo Hinzpeter (born 1965), Chilean lawyer and politician

== See also ==
- Heinz Peter (disambiguation)
