= Anita Hugi =

Swiss author and journalist

Anita Hugi (born 1975 in Grenchen) is a Swiss author, producer, journalist, editor, filmmaker and festival director. She was editor in charge of the documentary film program Sternstunde Kunst of SRF from 2006 to 2016, program director of the Festival International du Film sur l'Art (FIFA) in Montreal (Canada) from 2016 to 2018 and director of the Solothurn Film Festival from August 2019 to August 2021 Since September 2023, she has been Head of the Film Department at the Geneva School of Art and Design (Haute école d'art et de design).

== Career path ==
Hugi spent her early childhood in the French-speaking Vauffelin in the Jura Mountains and completed her schooling in bilingualism Bienne. She studied Translation Studies at the Zurich University of Applied Sciences (ZHAW) in Zürich and Strasbourg with a postgraduate diploma in Cultural Criticism and Journalism.

From 1999 she worked as a freelancer for various Swiss media such as Der Bund, St. Galler Tagblatt, Basler Zeitung, Klartext, NZZ am Sonntag and WOZ Die Wochenzeitung and in 2005 became editor in charge of Sternstunde Kunst of Swiss Radio and Television (SRF). Between 2005 and 2016, she programmed, produced and accompanied more than 130 Swiss productions, including the film series Cherchez la femme with films on Sophie Taeuber-Arp, Meret Oppenheim, Manon and S. Corinna Bille, and initiated the film development prize Perspektive Sternstunde Kunst, which has been awarded at the Solothurn Film Festival since 2013. As the editor in charge of Sternstunde Kunst, she accompanied and programmed over 600 international film productions, most recently among others. films on the work and life of the filmmaker Marceline Loridan-Ivens, the photographer Dora Maar and the designer Charlotte Perriand.

In June 2016 she took over as program director of the Festival International du Film sur l'Art (FIFA) in Montréal (Canada) and on August 1, 2019, she became the director of the Solothurn Film Festival, the showcase of Swiss film. In August 2021, she was replaced as director of the Solothurn Film Festival against her will. In 2022, she took over as head of the cultural advisory board of the Swiss national exhibition project Svizra27.

As a journalist and editor she published the digital online magazine Neuland Magazin in 2009 together with the artist Lena Eriksson and the journalist Judith Stofer. From 2005 to 2019, she was on the board of the Freie Berufsjournalistinnen und -journalisten Zürich (FBZ), where she initiated and organized the "Prize for Independent Journalists" in 2010.

== Work ==
As an author, curator, and producer she is fundamentally interested in cinematic narrative forms, including new and interactive ones made possible by new technologies. She pursues these enterprises with her company Narrative Boutique and her own projects such as the interactive documentary projects Die rote Hanna in 2018, DADA-DATA, which she realized together with David Dufresne in 2016 and which was awarded the Grimme Online Award, among others, or in 2015 the film essay on Undine Gruenter Undine – Das Projekt der Liebe, for which she received the LiteraVision-Fernsehpreis in 2016, and in 2022 the documentary Heidis Alptraum. She works as a juror and lecturer.

== Filmography ==
- 2013: Der Jura tickt anders – Kultur an der Peripherie, by Anita Hugi, Christian Walther
- 2014: Lilly Keller – Take care of your garden
- 2015: Undine, the project to love
- 2016: Dada Data, with David Dufresne
- 2018: Hanna la Rouge, by Anita Hugi
- 2017: The Departed, by David Dufresne
- 2012: Sophie Taeuber Arp – A Famous Stranger, by Marina Rumjanzewa, Anita Hugi
- 2016: Dada Principle, by Marina Rumjanzewa (production)
- 2021: Lockdown Dada Dance, by Patrick Lindenmaier, Anita Hugi
- 2022: Marionettes in Motion, by Marina Rumjanzewa (production)
- 2022: Heidi's Nightmare, with Yoichi Kotabe, Petra Volpe and Marthe Keller
