= The World Around =

Design Conference

- Company type: 501c3 charitable organisation
- Website type: Online Media
- Founded: 2019
- Founders: Beatrice Galilee, Diego Marroquin
- Website: https://www.theworldaround.com

The World Around is a global design conference and media organisation that publishes video presentations and short documentary films under the slogan "Architecture's Now, Near, and Next" covering contemporary ideas and projects in architecture and design. The organisation is a 501c3 registered public charity in the United States, and seeks to "make the best new ideas in architecture accessible to all." The platform has a particular focus on climate change and social justice issues, and hosts the Young Climate Prize, a mentoring scheme for climate change-focused designers between the ages of 13 and 25.

As a conference, The World Around was first hosted in New York City in January 2020, and has since held five further events. The organisation collaborated with the design news website Dezeen on Earth Day 2020 for Dezeen's "Virtual Design Festival". In 2021, the Guggenheim welcomed a yearlong residency for The World Around, hosting the 2021 Summit and "In Focus: Land" virtually. In 2022 the yearly Summit remained at the Guggenheim Museum, in partnership with Het Nieuwe Instituut in Rotterdam, where June's "In Focus: Precarity" conference was held.

== Summits ==
The World Around was launched in New York City at the end of 2019 by Beatrice Galilee, the former curator of architecture at the Metropolitan Museum of Art, and Diego Marroquin, a private equity executive and philanthropist.

The first Summit was held in January 2020 at the TimesCenter in New York City. Speakers included Elizabeth Diller, Paolo Antonelli, Caroline Criado Perez, and David O'Reilly. On Earth Day, April 22, The World Around partnered with Dezeen to host the "Virtual Design Festival", featuring talks, interviews, short films and essays, "exploring ideas that could 'shape the future of our relationship with the planet'".

In 2021, the platform entered a year long residency at the Solomon R. Guggenheim Museum in New York City, hosting two summits. 2021 Summit, again held online, took as its premise that "if we can envision a different future, we can also push harder to create one." The session was divided into three sessions on "Pollinators", "Keepers", and "Builders", and featured speakers include Ryūe Nishizawa, David Adjaye, Liam Young, Francis Kéré, Alice Rawsthorn and Sumayya Vally. Cave Bureau, the first Kenyan representatives at the Venice Architecture Biennale, produced their contribution for the summit alongside their Biennale installation. In Focus: Land was held in October, with three sessions "Community", "Technology", and "Ecology" covering post-colonial land-issues in the United States.

In 2022, the yearly summit was held again at the Guggenheim Museum in collaboration with Het Nieuwe Instituut. Featured speakers included Tadao Ando, Lesley Lokko, and David Chipperfield. The event took a hybrid form, including live presentations and pre-recorded videos. In June, In Focus: Precarity was held in Rotterdam at Het Nieuwe Instituut.

== Young Climate Prize ==
On Earth Day 2022 The World Around launched the Young Climate Prize, offering mentorship to 25 climate designers between the ages of 13 and 25. The mentoring programme will include former The World Around speakers and other designers, curators, writers and artists, including the UN special envoy for International Water Affairs, Henk Ovink, and multimedia artist David O'Reilly.

== Reception ==
Reviewing The World Around's June 2022 In Focus: Precarity event at Het Nieuwe Instituut, Rotterdam, Aaron Betsky wrote in ARCHITECT Magazine that the event "combined a high degree of design thought—beauty, integrity of materials, composition, and form—with concrete ways in which the discipline can address important social and environmental issues."

Covering the January 2022 Summit for Elle Decor, Elisabetta Donati de Conti noted how the presenters on display were 'searching for new alternatives, exploring new avenues that often lead to marvelous surprises.'

== Partners and sponsors ==
The World Around has partnered with art museums the Guggenheim Museum and Het Nieuwe Instituut, and magazines Pin-Up and Volume, as well as Dezeen. The World Around's primary sponsors are currently Meta Open Arts, the social media company's arts philanthropy programme, and Amura, an Italian furniture brand.

== See also ==
- Solomon R. Guggenheim Museum
- Het Nieuwe Instituut
