= Founterior =

- Editor: Gas Tontch
- Categories: Interior design
- Frequency: Daily
- Founder: Martin Patzekov, Cvetelina Todorova
- Founded: 2012
- Company: Founterior
- Country: United States
- Based in: New York City
- Language: English
- Website: founterior.com

Founterior is an American-based online interior design magazine that covers the field of design. The four major subjects of the magazine are interior design, furniture, decorations, and architecture. It was established in December 2012 and updated on a daily basis. The founders of the magazine are Martin Patzekov and Cvetelina Todorova.

== History ==
The first issue was presented as an interior design magazine and was focused only on interiors. The magazine is located in New York City, but it is not limited only to American readers.

== Recognition ==
In a recent chart of interior design and architecture magazine, Founterior was listed as a source of information. Also, a Los Angeles based magazine credited Founterior for their research on school architecture.

== Editors ==
- Martin Patzekov (2012–2013)
- Max Titch (2013)
- Gas Tontch (2013–2014)
