= Ben Wu (interior designer) =

Chinese interior designer

- 吴滨 Wu Bin
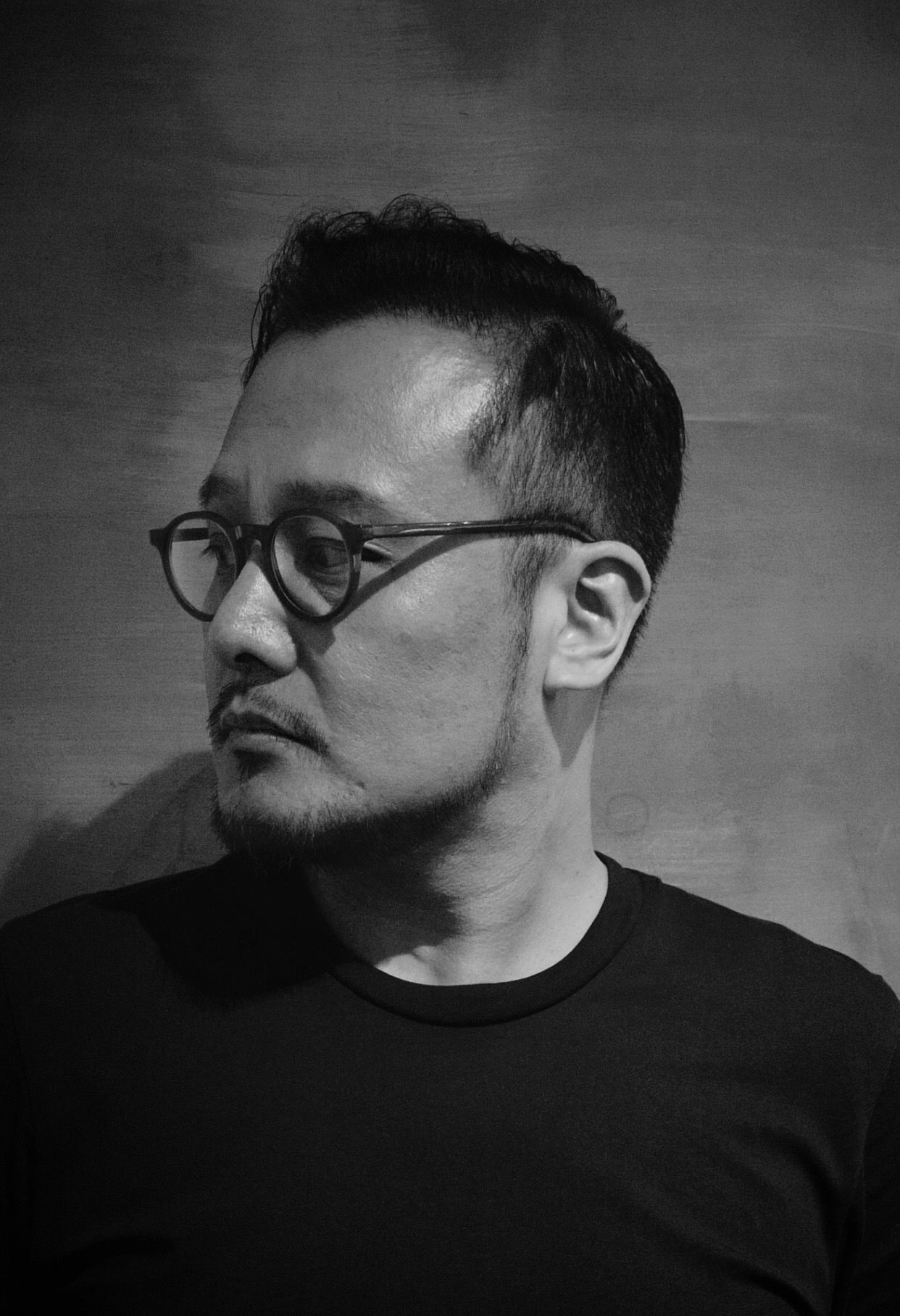
- Occupations: Interior designer, artist
- Years active: 1993 - present
- Awards: Best of Competition Winners for Best of Asia Pacific Awards and Global Excellence Awards - 2025; Design Anthology Awards - 2025; Architectural Digest AD100 List 2013, 2015, 2017, 2019, 2021, 2023, 2025; Andrew Martin Interior Designer of the Year Award - 2020
- Website: www.designerwubin.com

Ben Wu (Chinese: 吴滨 Wu Bin) is a Chinese interior designer and artist based in Shanghai, China. He is the founder of the design firm W.Design, and lifestyle brand WS Space. Wu's work has won numerous awards such as Best of Competition Winners for 2025 Best of Asia Pacific Awards and 2025 Global Excellence Awards, Design Anthology Awards,Elle Deco China Interior Design Awards, a Red Dot Design Award, an Andrew Martin Interior Designer of the Year Award, and seven times of AD100 Awards from Architectural Digest. His design style has been described as “Modern Orientalism.”

== Career ==
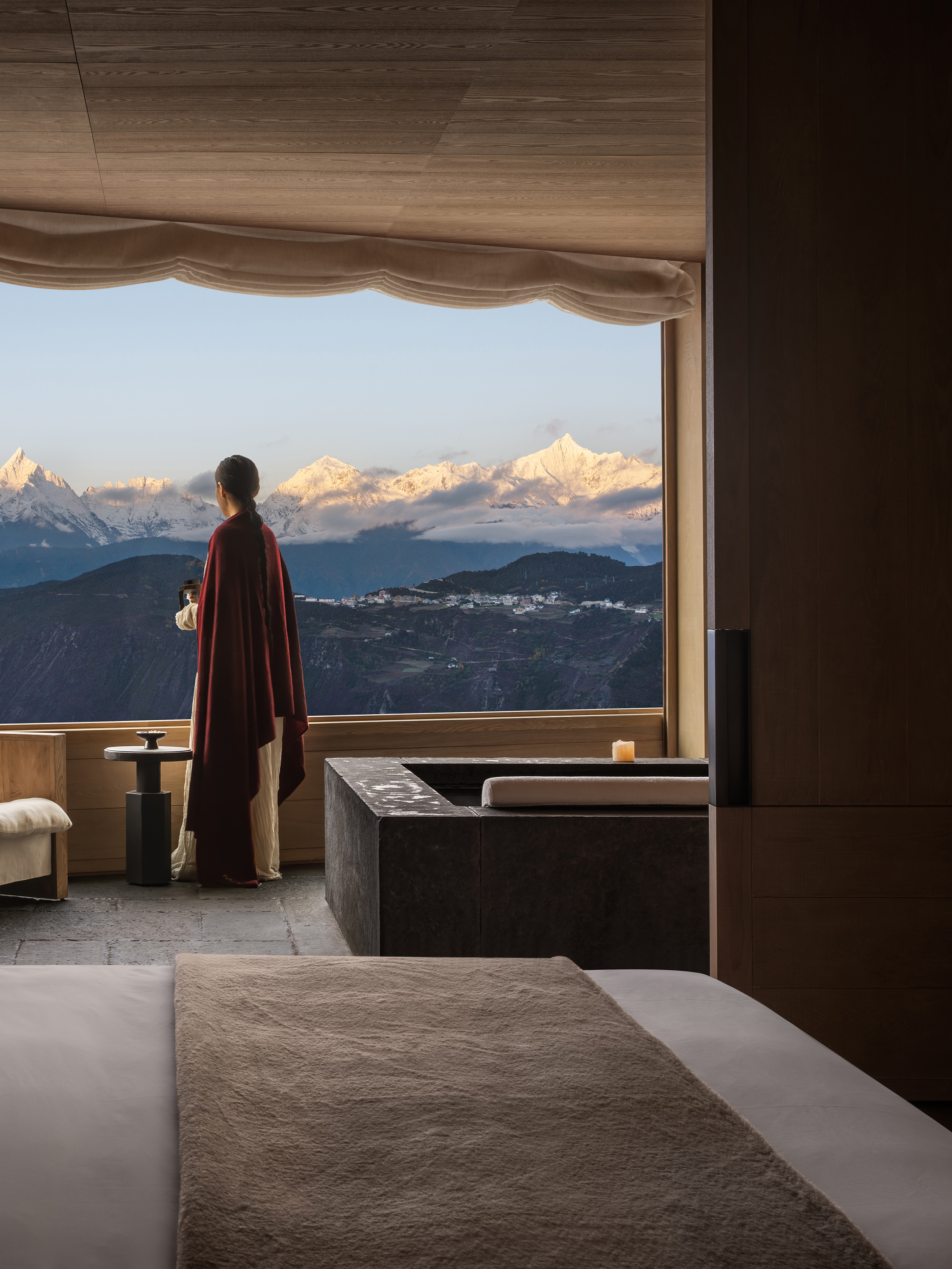
Meri Poodom Hotel by Wu Bin of W.DESIGN, 2025

Wu began his career in home and interior design in 1993. He established his first design firm, WS Group, in 1998. He went on to found several more design and lifestyle brands, including W.Design, WS Space, Weimo, and Haishang.

Wu served as an ambassador and panelist for the Ideal Home Show event in Shanghai in 2017. Wu also unveiled his “Ben Wu Ink” line of marble furniture at Milan Design Week in April 2018. Wu also received the Red Dot Award for his work designing the Auto Experience Space at the He Tong Hang Championway in 2018.

In 2020, Wu received the 24th annual Andrew Martin Interior Designer of the Year Award, becoming the first designer from mainland China to receive the award. In the same year, Wu served on the jury panel for the Living in China, Design Award.

In 2021, Wu received a Bronze, Silver, and two Gold Awards at the A’Design Award & Competition. He also collaborated with the Italian furniture brand Longhi, designing furniture for its Rhythm 2021 collection.

Wu presented an art installation titled Journey to the Mountains at Design Dome, an event that was part of Shenzhen Creative Week 2022.

Wu served as a panelist at the Design Shanghai event in 2023.

== Art and product design ==
In 2022, Wu presented an art installation titled Journey to the Mountains at Design Dome, an event that was part of Shenzhen Creative Week.

Ben has also designed modern furniture.

== Selected awards ==
- Best of Competition Winners for 2025 Best of Asia Pacific Awards and 2025 Global Excellence Awards
- Design Anthology Awards,
- Interior Design Hall of Fame - 2016
- Best of Year Awards - Gold Medal - 2017
- Red Dot Award - 2018
- Architectural Digest AD100 List 2013, 2015, 2017, 2019 and 2021
- Andrew Martin Interior Designer of the Year Award - 2020
- A’Design Award Competition - Bronze, Silver, Gold (x2) Awards - 2021
- Elle Deco China Interior Design Awards - 2021
- Muse Design Awards - Platinum Award (Interior Design - Showroom/Exhibit) - 2023
