= Jill Mulleady =

Uruguayan-born artist

- Born: Montevideo, Uruguay
- Education: Chelsea College of Arts, London
- Occupation: Artist

Jill Mulleady is an artist. She was born in Montevideo, Uruguay, and grew up in Buenos Aires, Argentina. She moved to London to study at Chelsea School of Art, in 2007–09, where she received a Master of Fine Arts degree. She lives and work in Los Angeles, California.

She works primarily in painting and she often intervenes in the spaces where she exhibits, staging the paintings with readymades, sculptures, and architectural installations, exploring themes of memory, transformation, and the power of history. In her work, references to historical painting are put into communication with images taken from both popular culture and personal life, creating an anachronic feeling of merged and frictional temporalities. Her practice shifts between close observations of everyday reality and highly elaborated imaginary worlds.

These paintings can be seen as allegories for the contemporary experience of the image as interface: not just a picture but a means of mobilising attention, bodies and affects within an increasingly virtualized social space.

Her work has been shown at the Whitney Museum of American Art, Hammer Museum, Huntington Library, Le Consortium, 58th Venice Biennale central exhibition, Kunsthalle Bern, Swiss Institute Contemporary Art New York , National Archaeological Museum, Naples, Hirshhorn Museum and Sculpture Garden, Washington, DC, Luis Barragán House and Studio, Mexico City, Schinkel Pavillon, Berlin and Eduardo Sívori Museum, Buenos Aires.

Mulleady's works are held in the collections of the Hammer Museum, Los Angeles; Musée d'Art Moderne de Paris, Whitney Museum of American Art, Hirshhorn Museum and Sculpture Garden, Washington DC; Los Angeles County Museum of Art, Los Angeles; Le Consortium, Fondazione S. de Rebaudengo, Turin; among others.
