= Emmanuel Olunkwa =

American artist and writer (born 1994)

- Born: 1994 (age 31–32); Los Angeles, California, U.S.
- Alma mater: Eugene Lang College of Liberal Arts, Columbia University
- Website: olunkwa.studio

Emmanuel Olunkwa (born 1994) is a Nigerian-American artist, writer, designer, editor, and filmmaker. From September 2024 to 2025, Olunkwa led publishing and editorial at 52 Walker, David Zwirner’s Tribeca-based gallery, where he established the gallery’s in-house publishing and editorial role during its period as a permanent brick-and-mortar space. From September 2021 to February 2024, he served as the editor of Pin-Up Magazine. In 2020, Olunkwa co-founded November Magazine, E&Ko., and served as a founding editor of The Broadcast, a publication by the cultural center Pioneer Works. Olunkwa’s work has been published in The New York Times, Artforum, Interview, T Magazine, Architectural Digest, and he is based in New York.

== Early life and education ==
Olunkwa was born and raised in Los Angeles, CA, where he developed an early interest in photography during high school. His fascination with design was sparked by observing the evolving real estate landscape of his hometown and the elaborate remodels shaping its architectural identity.

In 2014, Olunkwa moved to New York and later graduated with a B.A. in Liberal Arts from the Eugene Lang College at The New School with a concentration in Race, Art History, and Architectural Spatiality. During his final year, he interned at MoMA PS1 as a curatorial intern and later joined Artforum as a fact-checking intern, eventually becoming an editorial assistant, where he assisted the editor-in-chief David Velasco.

In 2021, he graduated with an M.S. in the Critical, Curatorial, and Conceptual Practices program from Columbia University's Graduate School of Architecture, Planning, and Preservation. His graduate thesis examined the spatial dynamics of Slave Play, the Tony-nominated production by Jeremy O. Harris that explores themes of race and sexuality.

== Work ==
Olunkwa has interviewed a diverse range of cultural figures, including artists and designers Jeff Koons, Glenn Ligon, and Marc Newson, curators Thelma Golden and Hamza Walker, architects Rem Koolhaas and Mabel O. Wilson, musicians Oneohtrix Point Never and Devonté Hynes, and writers Mary Gaitskill, Andrea Long Chu, Doreen St. Félix and Sarah Schulman among others. His photography has appeared in Dazed, Garage, Vogue, Cultured, and e-flux and spans across album covers, magazine profiles, and book covers.

Olunkwa was a founding editor of Pioneer Works’s The Broadcast, a publication spanning art, music, science, and technology.

In June 2020, Olunkwa founded E&Ko., a furniture line of chairs and floral-inspired birch plywood pieces, exhibited alongside artists such as Walter Price, Paul Chan, Wade Guyton, and Rachel Harrison at galleries like Greene Naftali in East Hampton, N. Y. That July, he co-founded November Magazine, a non-profit dedicated to publishing and programming around contemporary art and culture. Founded alongside Lauren O’Neill-Butler, the magazine includes Dawn Chan and Aria Dean as its founding editors. In the fall of 2021, he presented a new capsule collection of design work for SSENSE.

In September 2021, Olunkwa was named editor of Pin-Up Magazine, a biannual publication focused on "architectural entertainment". He became the magazine's second editor, succeeding founder Felix Burrichter, who became its creative and editorial director. Speaking to The New York Times, Olunkwa said "Pin-Up prides itself on its rigorous optimism, so I want to continue complicating what this idea of 'architectural entertainment' can mean". The first issue under his leadership explored the theme of "radical optimism".
