= Seraina Rohrer =

Swiss director of the Solothurn Film Festival (born 1977)

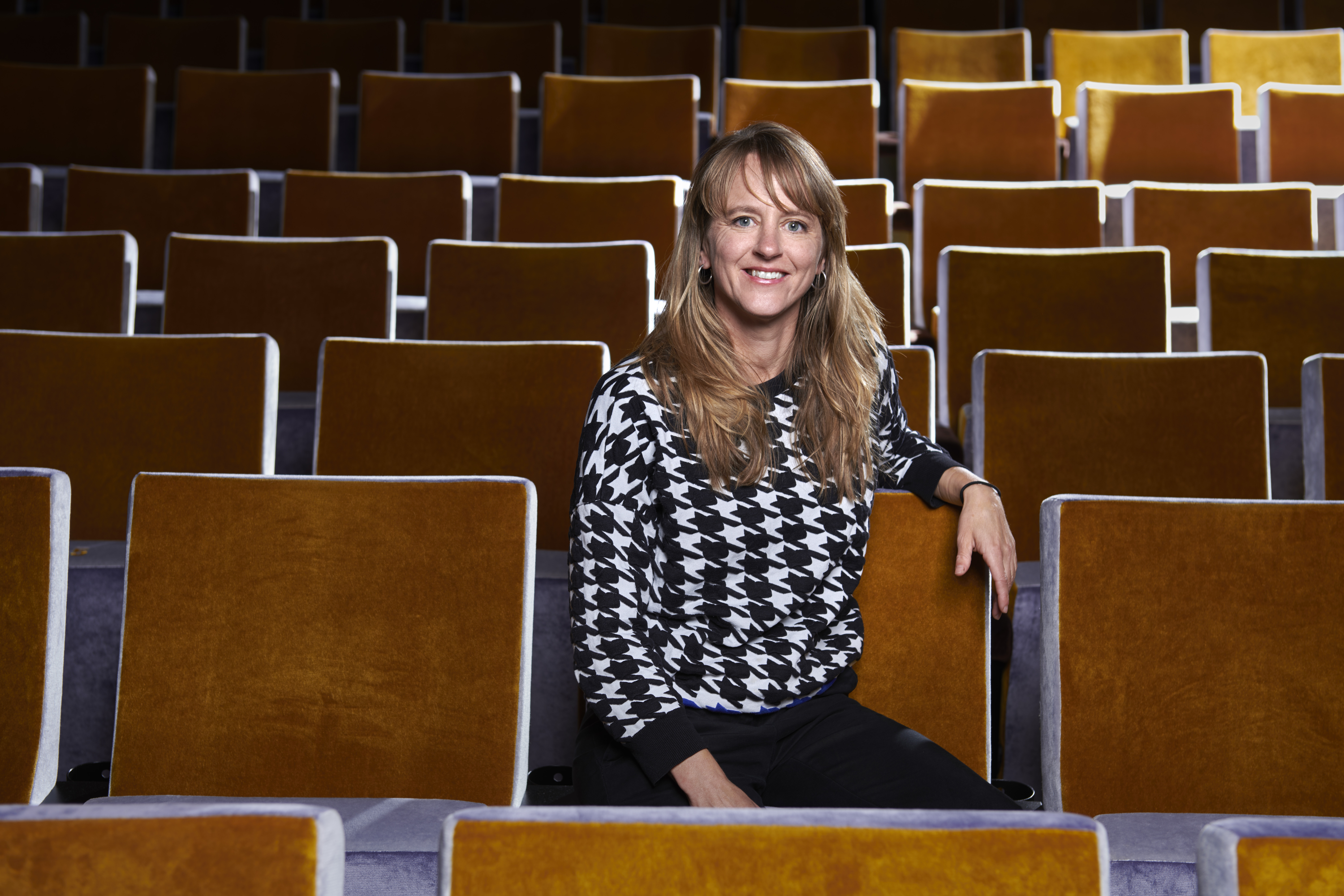
Seraina Rohrer in 2022

Seraina Rohrer (born 1977, Männedorf) is a Swiss audiovisual executive, academic, and innovation specialist for the creative industries.

== Early life ==
Rohrer studied Film and Communication at the University of Zurich.

== Career ==
Rohrer has been a visiting scholar at the Chicano Studies Research Center of the University of California in University of California, Los Angeles for her PhD research, where she conducted her research for a book titled La India María: Mexploitation and the films of María Elena Velasco on the life and work of the famous Mexican comedian La India María. Rohrer lived and worked in Mexico for several years.

From 2003 to 2009, she headed the press office at the Locarno Festival and coordinated the launch of a joint masters program between Swiss colleges and universities for the audiovisual sector. She worked as a free-lance curator and was an expert for the Zurich Film Foundation. From 2011 to 2019, Rohrer was the Director of the Solothurn Film Festival hosting around 65,000 spectators, one of Switzerland's leading cultural events. In her role she was in charge of the festival's program as well as its overall strategy.

Rohrer regularly publishes newspaper articles, and for the Sunday edition of NZZ, for which she wrote a monthly column between 2012 and 2015. She is a member of various cultural institutions, including the UBS Cultural Foundation.

In 2020, Rohrer joined the cultural Foundation Pro Helvetia as member of the management board and head of the new sector Innovation & Society. In this function, she introduced initiatives and programs on diversity and inclusion as well as programs fostering transformation (among other things, she is in charge of a focus on art, science and technology).

In 2024, she became the head of the cultural affairs office of the Canton of Zurich.
