= Penny Martin =

British editor and writer (born 1972)

- Born: 1972 (age 53–54); Glasgow
- Education: Madras College
- Alma mater: University of Glasgow Manchester University Royal College of Art
- Occupations: Magazine editor, journalist, curator
- Title: Editor-in-chief, The Gentlewoman
- Awards: 2016 BSME Editor of the Year award for Women’s Brand

Penny Martin is an editor, writer, and curator. As of 2009 she is the editor-in-chief of the women’s magazine The Gentlewoman.

== Early life and education ==
Penny Martin grew up in St Andrews and was educated at Madras College. Her interest in art was cultivated by her mother and stepfather who worked as an art teacher and a history teacher and theatre critic respectively. Martin graduated from University of Glasgow with a degree in art history in addition to completing a course in museum studies at Manchester University. She pursued doctoral studies at the Royal College of Art.

== Career ==
Prior to her work in fashion, Martin worked part-time at the Fawcett Library. She also worked as a curator of photographs in the collections of The National Museum of Photography, Film & Television. Her media career started in 2001 after Nick Knight invited her to work as editor of SHOWstudio.com. Over seven years there, she commissioned and executed interactive, motion and live fashion projects for the Internet. Martin collaborated with many figures in fashion and design, including Alexander McQueen, Peter Saville, Kate Moss, Hussein Chalayan and the estate of Erwin Blumenfeld. In 2008, Martin returned to academia as the Chair of Fashion Media at London College of Fashion, University of the Arts London. She curated two exhibitions there during 2009, at The Photographers’ Gallery and at Somerset House. She is a member of the development committee of Studio Voltaire and a trustee of the National Trust for Scotland.

=== The Gentlewoman ===
When Jop van Bennekom and Gert Jonkers, the Dutch founder-owners of men’s magazines BUTT and Fantastic Man, wanted to establish a women's magazine, they invited Martin to join them. The Gentlewoman launched in 2010. "With a publication that's produced by as few people as ours," she explained about The Gentlewoman, "you can take a lot of risks, so of course it's going to be about your personal tastes." Martin is also a regular contributor to Fantastic Man and The Happy Reader.

=== Awards ===
In 2016, Martin received the British Society of Magazine Editors Editor of the Year award in the Women’s Brand – Monthly or Less Frequent category.
