= Solothurn Film Festival =

Annual film festival in Solothurn, Switzerland

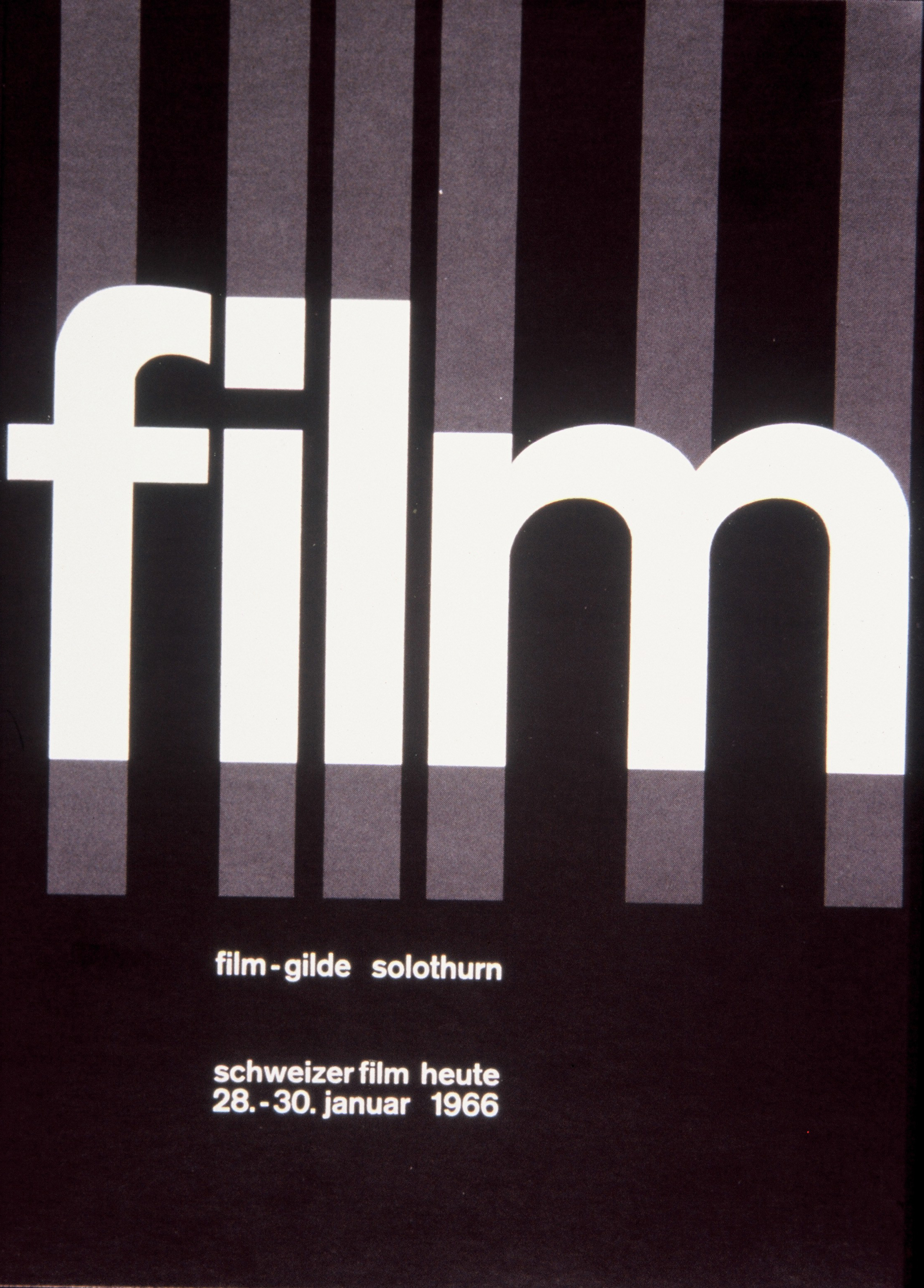
- Location: Solothurn, Switzerland
- Established: 1966
- Most recent: 2026
- Artistic director: Niccolò Castelli
- Festival date: 21 - 28 January 2026

Current: 61th
- 62st 60th

The Solothurn Film Festival is a Swiss film festival held at the end of January each year in Solothurn. Founded in 1966, it is one of the oldest film festivals in Switzerland. The heart of the programme is Swiss filmmaking, which makes it both a crowd-pleaser and a nexus for industry professionals.

Each year the jury awards the «Prix de Soleure,» the film prize that comes with the highest award money. The Solothurn Film Festival lasts eight days and attracts around 65,000 attendees (as of 2026).

It all began back in 1966 when the Solothurn Film Guild organized a conference titled «Swiss Film Today.» The event aimed to present and discuss new works by young, independent Swiss filmmakers. This conference evolved into the «Schweizerische Gesellschaft Solothurner Filmtage» (SGSF) – or the Swiss Society for the Solothurn Film festival, which continues to organize the film festival to this day. As of 2026, the society has around 400 members.

One hundred filmmakers participated in the first Solothurn Film Festival which screened twenty-two films. Among them were works by Fredi M. Murer, Alain Tanner, Claude Goretta, Jean-Luc Godard, Alexander J. Seiler, June Kovac, and Henry Brandt. The Solothurn Film Festival has since evolved further into a showcase for progressive auteur cinema and a national platform for discussion on cultural policy issues.

Alphons Egli was the first federal councillor to open the festival on the occasion of its 20th anniversary in 1985. This established the festival as a cultural event of national significance. In 1998, the Swiss Film Award «Quartz» was presented for the first time during the festival. The Solothurn Film Festival drew around 40,000 attendees in 2003 and more than 50,000 in 2010. Special school screenings starting in 2026 attracted around 5,000 children and teens.

The programme has continued to grow along with the public interest, without losing the spirit of its founding days. The principle of the «democratic screen» remains in place today: along with the festival directors, active filmmakers also serve on the selection committee. Films are screened in movie theatres as well as in historic buildings throughout the city of Solothurn, including the Landhaus, the Rythalle, the concert hall, and the Genossenschaft Kreuz.

Other national institutions have emerged from initiatives launched by the Solothurn Film Festival, including the industry magazine «Cinébulletin» in 1975, the promotional agency SWISS FILMS in 1976, the Swiss Film Academy in 2008, the umbrella organization «Conférence des festivals» in 2010, as well as the online publication «filmo» in 2018.

== Festival management ==
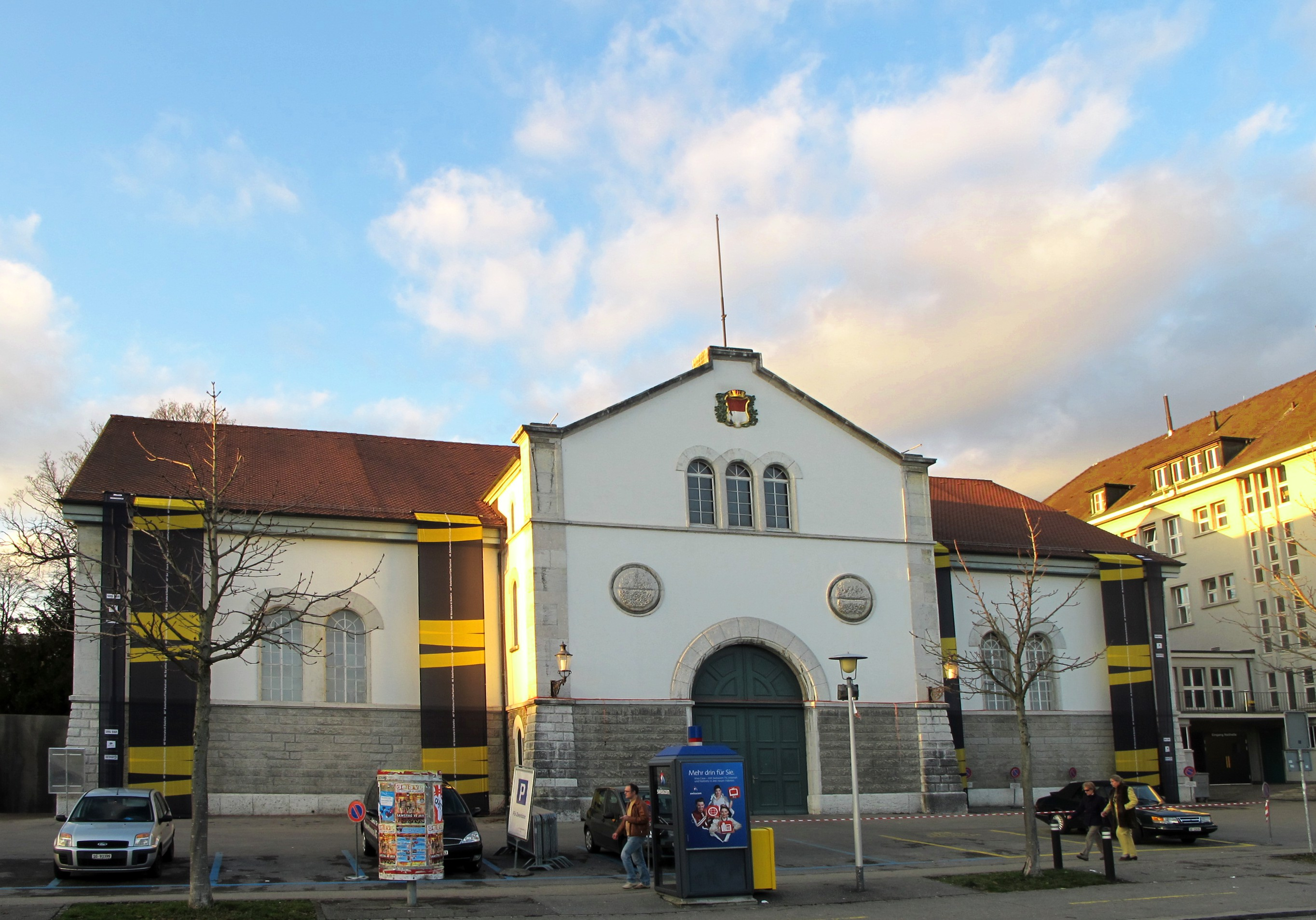
Solothurner Filmtage 2011

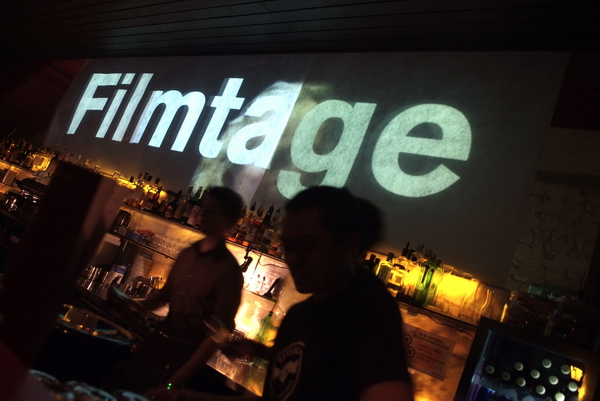
Party at Solheure Festival Club

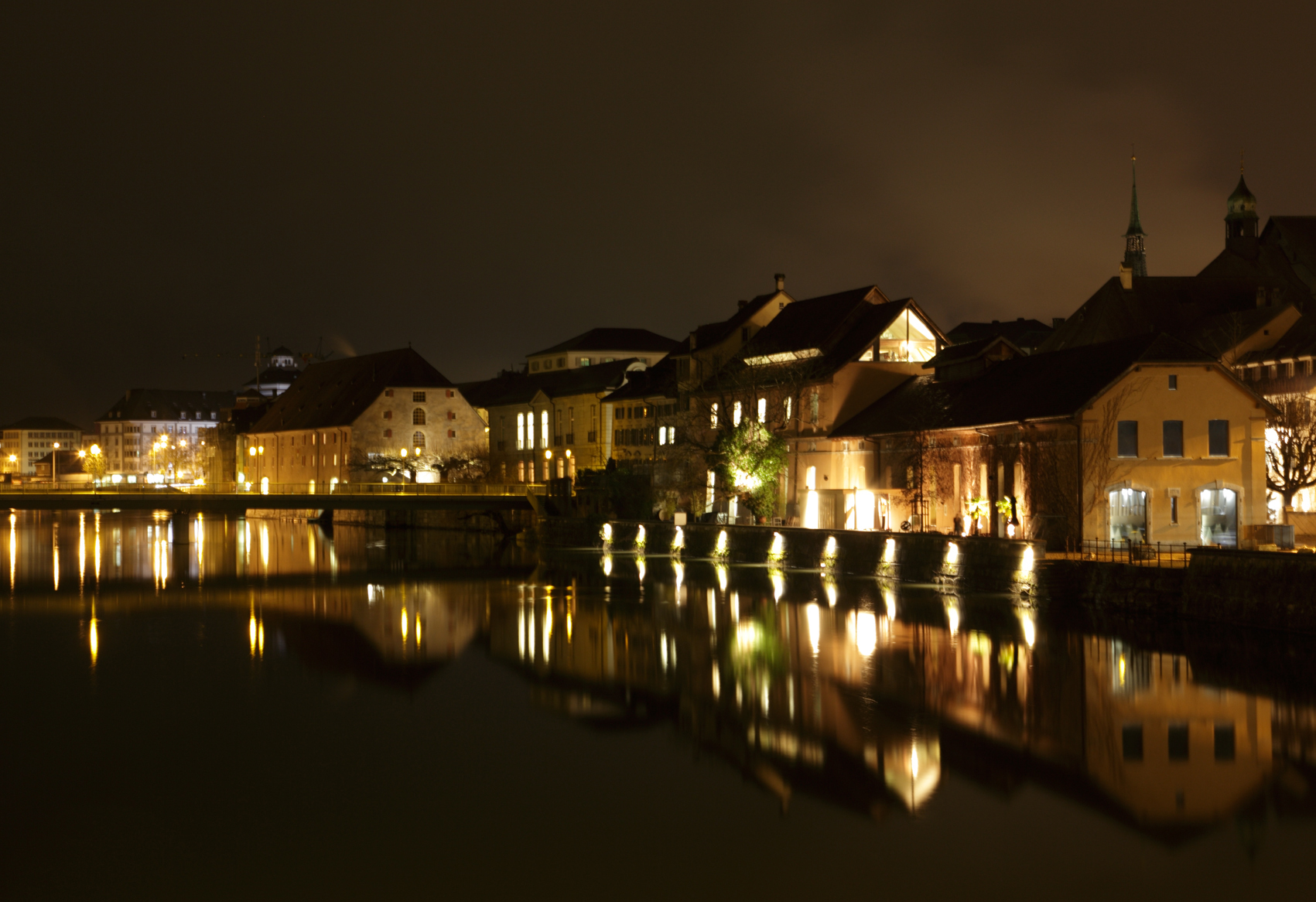
Typical lighting of Landhaus and Uferbau during the festival

Stephan Portmann served as the first director of the Solothurn Film Festival beginning in 1967. In 1987, he was succeeded by Ivo Kummer, in turn followed by Seraina Rohrer who was elected as his successor in 2011. Anita Hugi led the Solothurn Film Festival for two years from 2019 to 2021. The 57th edition in 2022 was organized by interim co-directors Marianne Wirth and David Wegmüller (artistic directors) and Veronika Roos (administrative director).

This laid the groundwork for the transition to a dual leadership system. Monica Rosenberg (Operations Director) and Niccolò Castelli (Artistic Director) assumed the leadership of the Solothurn Film Festival in 2022.

Andreas Spillmann currently serves as president of the SGSF society, the festival organizer. Previous presidents of the association have included Helmut Hubacher, Ruth Grossenbacher, Ernst Leuenberger, Christine Beerli, Felix Gutzwiller, and Thomas Geiser, among others.

«Fare Cinema», the daily, public, matinee, is a discussion based programme focused on the practical aspects of filmmaking and a vibrant debate culture.

== Programme ==
The «Panorama» showcase is the centrepiece of the Solothurn Film Festival, presenting a selection of current Swiss productions from all language regions, genres, and running times. Reflecting the diversity of artistic expression, the showcase also includes Swiss co-productions with minority participation and films by foreign filmmakers residing in Switzerland.

Two film history programmes contextualise the audiovisual heritage and connect it with contemporary filmmaking. «Rencontre» honours a prominent figure in Swiss cinema and offers an in-depth look at their filmography. «Histoires,» produced in partnership with «Cinémathèque Suisse» and «filmo», traces the history of Swiss cinema through selected works from specific eras.

Since 2012, «Fokus» is the international program section dedicated to addressing a pressing issue or social trend through current films. The aim of this curated film series is to look beyond Switzerland’s borders and to promote exchanges between domestic and international guests.

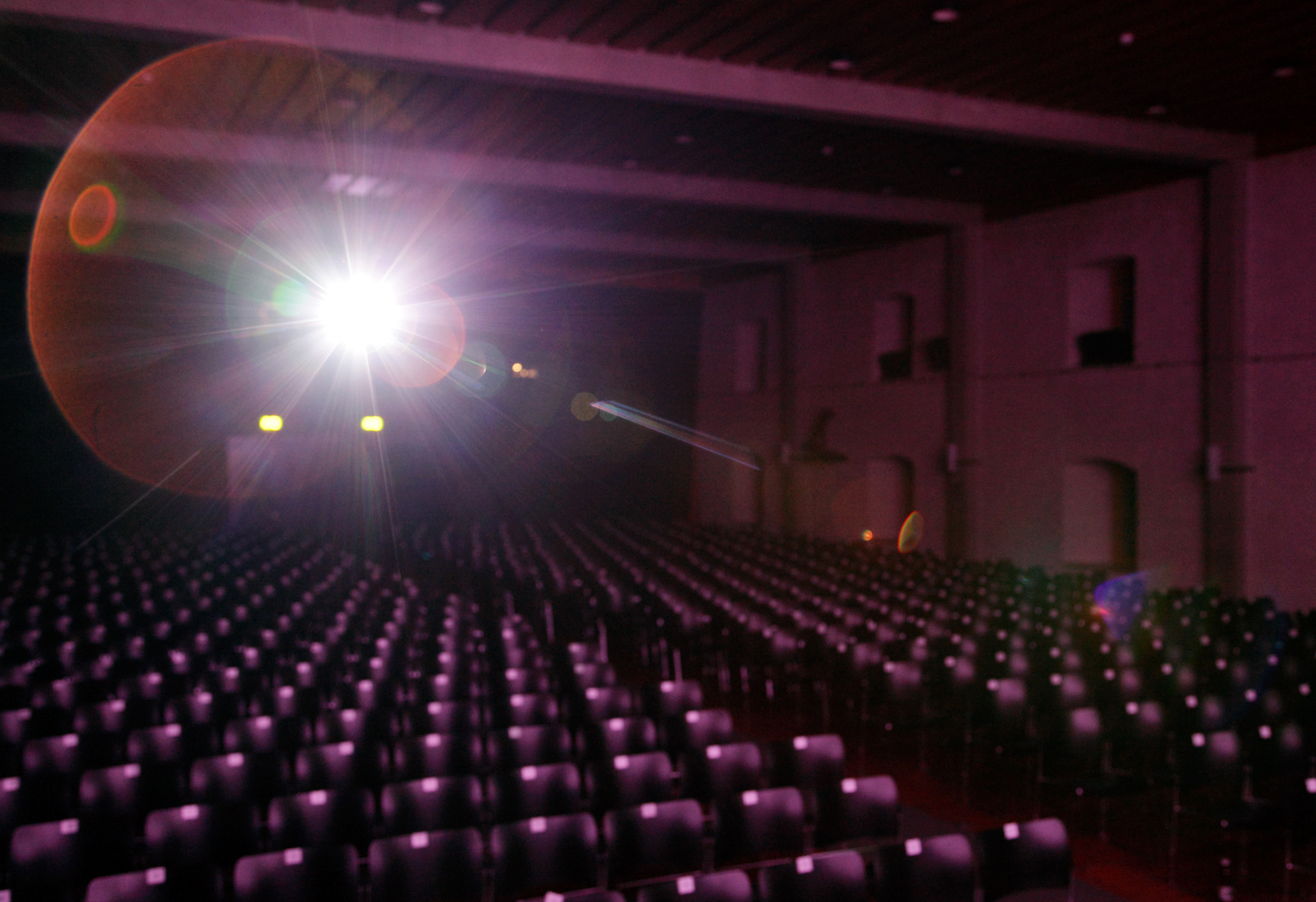
Final preparations before the Landhaus gets crowded

== SO PRO ==
Since 2024, the Solothurn Film Festival has brought together its diverse range of networking and professional development opportunities for the Swiss film industry under the name «SO PRO.» The three-day industry programme includes pitching sessions, labs, panels, and workshops, developed in collaboration with Swiss film institutions and film associations. Migros-Kulturprozent Story Lab is the programme’s main partner.

== Awards and tributes ==
Three competitions provide a competitive framework for «Panorama»: An interdisciplinary jury awards the «Prix de Soleure» (CHF 60,000) to a socially critical feature film. «Visioni» (CHF 20,000), selected by a jury of experts, honours a first or second feature film. The audience selects its favourite with the «PRIX DU PUBLIC» (CHF 20,000).

An animated film and a short film are also honoured through audience voting (CHF 10,000 each). The «Talente» competition supports students and young self-taught filmmakers: a jury

awards the Emerging Talent Prize for the best short film (CHF 10,000). Development grants of CHF 5,000 are awarded to two projects from each of the two creative labs, «Perspectives Lab» and «Screen to Sound.»

The «Prix Swissperform – Acting Award,» presented by the jury, is awarded annually to distinguish performances in a leading role, a supporting role, an emerging talent, and a special achievement in Swiss television productions. Each of the four categories comes with a prize of CHF 10,000.

Finally, the «Prix d’honneur» honours an individual who has made a special contribution to Swiss film culture. The award of CHF 10,000 is intended to be a token of appreciation for work that is often done «behind the scenes,» much of which goes unrecognized. The selection committee recommends the recipient.

== Other engagements ==
The Solothurn Film Festival has had a year-round administrative office since 1987. The «Cinetour» project has operated from here since 2008 in partnership with its main sponsor, Swiss Life. The programme, consisting mostly of short films, promotes Swiss cinema throughout the year in both German-speaking and French-speaking Switzerland. The Solothurn Film Festival manages a fund for subtitling in all national languages. As part of the Locarno Film Festival, the Solothurn Film Festival has organised the «Panorama Suisse» program series since 2015, in collaboration with SWISS FILMS and the Swiss Film Academy.

In 2018, the Solothurn Film Festival, together with Engagement Migros, launched the «filmo» project, the online platform featuring Swiss cinema. «filmo» brings Swiss film classics to existing video-on-demand platforms and promotes Swiss cinema in the digital space.

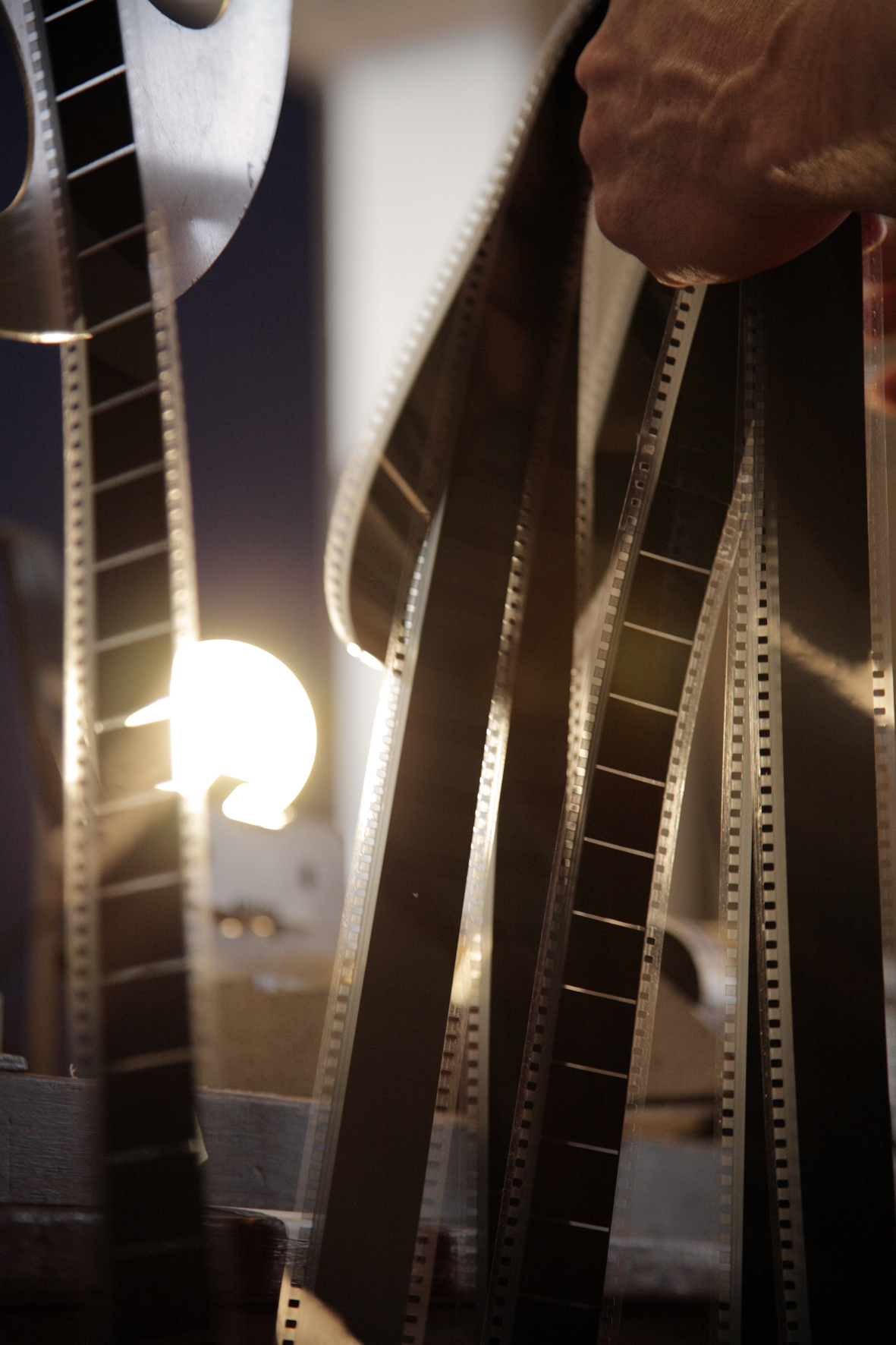
Spools of film for the screening

== Web links ==
- Website Solothurn Film Festival
- Facebook-Page of the Solothurn Film Festival
- Twitter-Channel of the Solothurn Film Festival
