= Interior design magazine =

Type of magazine

An interior design magazine is a publication that focuses primarily on interior design in a hard copy periodical format or on the Internet.

Interior design magazines document the interiors of homes, furniture, home accessories, textiles, and architecture, usually in a highly stylized or staged format. They may also feature cafes, historic houses, eco-friendly living, and cutting-edge design.

Each issue or publication often acts as a “how-to” guide for interior decorating and styling, as well as providing readers with up-to-date design news and the latest trends. Contemporary houses in the magazines today are often highly styled photographs, which are done by interior stylists or decorators. They often do not feature people and just focus on the furniture or interior. Some magazines, such as Apartamento, feature homes that are not staged, but rather highlight elements of the house just as the inhabitant has left them.

== 18th-century origins ==
The 18th century was the first period in which English domestic interiors were represented in both text and image. The format and writing of interior design magazines were mainly modeled on architecture and art journals, which began publication from the 1890s. These magazines began to lay the origins of domesticity, homemaking and decorating, which would later continue to grow into separate titles. It was Alexander Koch who was responsible for Germany's first serial publications specifically on interior design. Koch's Innendekoration started publication in January 1890, while his Deutsche Kunst und Dekoration (1897–1932) also focused primarily on interiors. They were joined by others such as Das Interieur (1900–1915) in Vienna, and House Beautiful (1896–1930) in Chicago. House Beautiful was a consumer driven magazine that aimed to fulfill the aspirations of the reader, rather than presenting an actually achievable or affordable home. These magazines circulated internationally and their impact can be measured by the second generation of magazines, often similar in format, that were formed in their mould in the years to follow.

Graphic layouts became an important feature for interior design magazines, as many began following each other or beginning their own trend. It began allowing more space, focusing on the arrangement and layout of text, image and font. The titling of the drawings, in stylized capitals, was carried out in a specific style associated with the Rudolf von Larisch school of lettering. Often the interior schemes were represented from above and from a diagonal axis, emphasizing the angularity of the composition with a rapidly receding vanishing point. Illustrations ranged from full colour paintings to carefully reproduced lithography prints of interiors and drawings, usually in colour. From the 1920s onwards, design publishing was driven by avant-garde design ideals and commercial publishing practices. The introduction of the digital camera in the late 20th century allowed photographers to capture the interiors of celebrities as well as everyday people.

== Domestic advice books ==
The second half of the 19th century brought about the development of several publications offering advice on how to manage and decorate the home. Suggestions ranging from fashioning gothic architecture inspired furniture and embroidery were featured in household manuals Cassell's Household Guide and Isabella Beeton's Book of Household Management, published in the 1860s. Aimed at the increasing Victorian middle class, these manuals encouraged the purchase of material goods for their homes. The manual Hints on Household Taste by Charles Eastlake first published in 1868 dealt explicitly with decorative choice and consisted of articles that were first successive in magazines. Inspired by American advice manuals, these books often reflected on the gendered nature of society, drawing divisions between the ‘masculine’ dining room and ‘feminine’ drawing room. Design suggestions for the drawing room included using light colours while methods for dining rooms, libraries and studies featured heavy furniture and animal skins.

However, domestic manuals in the 1920s revealed the changes in the gendered division of space and pushed the rise of the sitting room as a shared space. From the 1920s to the 1970s, advice literature was increasingly concerned with the shift from a service culture to a self-service culture. This stems from the idea that readers now had to learn how to host dinner parties or functions with the absence of a butler or housekeeper. Advice writers catered to a new group of readers keen to entertain in a manner different from the one they had known growing up. The hostess performed the conflicting roles of both entertaining the guests and cooking, which involved her in both front and backstage regions of the home.

== Retail catalogues for interiors ==
A rise in interest of home furnishings for 19th-century middle-class Britain and US meant there was a higher demand for furniture in department stores and furniture shops. Capitalizing on the power of the wealthy class to whom they appealed, retailers took advantage of cheaply available printing methods and began selling retail catalogues. These pamphlets presented information of furniture and interiors available to all consumers and in particular, Sears, who offered to deliver any item countrywide. Terrance Conran's Habitat, founded in 1964, came about to service a growing number of affluent consumers, intent on purchasing a cost-efficient interior presented in ready-to-made rooms. The first Habitat catalogue in 1966 was marketed as a guide to decorating a home and not just a telling tool. Swedish company IKEA created the same room-set device to document its tens of thousands of products and in the process dominated the global market in the late 20th century. Founded by Ingvar Kamprad in 1943, the catalogue was first produced in 1951 and by 2002 had a distribution figure of 110 million across 34 languages.

== List of interior design magazines ==
Below is a list of popular interior design magazines:

=== US magazines ===
- Architectural Digest
- Better Homes and Gardens
- Dwell
- Elle Decor
- Founterior
- HGTV Magazine
- House Beautiful
- Interior Design
- Interiors - defunct
- Metropolis
- Veranda
- Vogue Living

=== UK magazines ===
- House & Garden
- House Beautiful
- Wallpaper
- World of Interiors

=== Digital magazines ===
- Dezeen
