= Luis Venegas =

Luis Venegas may refer to:

- Luis Venegas de Henestrosa (1510-1570), Spanish composer
- Luis Venegas (footballer) (born 1984), Mexican footballer
- Luis Venegas (publisher) (fl. 1996-present), Spanish magazine publisher and creative director
