= Interior Design (magazine) =

American magazine (founded 1932)

- Categories: Interior design
- Frequency: Monthly
- Founder: Harry V. Anderson
- Founded: 1932
- Company: Sandow Media
- Country: United States
- Based in: New York City, New York
- Language: English
- Website: interiordesign.net
- ISSN: 0020-5508
- OCLC: 5965672

Interior Design is an American interior design magazine, which has been in circulation since 1932.

== History and profile ==
Interior Design was founded by Harry V. Anderson in Manhattan in 1932. He was also the publisher and editor of the magazine, which temporarily ceased publication during World War II. Following the war Anderson and John Hay Whitney of Whitney Communications Company relaunched the magazine. In 1959, the company became the sole owner of Interior Design. Harry V. Anderson served as the editor and publisher until 1969.

The other editors have included Donald D. Macmillan; Sherman R. Emery, from 1960 to 1983; and Stanley Abercrombie. The current editor is Cindy Allen. In 1984, Cahners Publishing, later Reed Business Information, bought the magazine from Whitney Communications Company. Sandow Media acquired the magazine in March 2010. The interior design magazine is headquartered in New York City.

== See also ==
- List of United States magazines
