= The Gentlewoman (magazine) =

UK arts and culture magazine

- Filmmaker Agnès Varda on the cover of issue 18, autumn/winter 2018
- Editor-in-chief: Penny Martin
- Categories: Arts and culture
- Frequency: Biannual
- Circulation: Under 100,000
- Publisher: Gert Jonkers; Jop van Bennekom
- Founded: 2010
- First issue: 2010
- Country: United Kingdom
- Based in: Soho, London
- Language: English
- Website: thegentlewoman.co.uk

The Gentlewoman is a biannual magazine (Not to be confused with the Edwardian period magazine of the same name The Gentlewoman) which is focused on arts and culture published by Dutch duo Gert Jonkers and Jop van Bennekom. It was launched in 2010 as the sister publication to Fantastic Man. The inaugural issue featured designer Phoebe Philo on the cover. The magazine is based in Soho, London.

The current editor-in-chief of the magazine is Penny Martin who has held that position since the magazine's inception in 2010.

The magazine has a circulation rate of just under 100,000 readers worldwide.
