= Heinz Peter Knes =

German photographer (born 1969)

Heinz Peter Knes is a photographer. He is born in 1969 in Gemünden am Main, Germany.

Heinz Peter Knes studied photography on Fachhochschule Dortmund, from 1993 to 1999. Since 2001 Knes has lived in Berlin. His work has been published in several international magazines, including Camera Austria, Wire, 032c, Iann, Spex, Dutch, Readymade, Freier, i-D, Butt or Purple, . In 1998 he co-founded the photofanzine Strahlung.

Knes was first recognised through his work about adolescence: a series of photographes called "E.M.T. in MSP". He became known outside Germany through his collaboration with Butt. His contributions to the magazine have been gathered in the anthology Best of Butt, published by Taschen.

Knes has exhibited in the past years in New York City, Oslo, Paris, Los Angeles, Amsterdam, Berlin or Lisbon. In 2008, the Cobra Museum of Modern Art included a series of portraits in the exhibition "Gewoon Anders/ Just Different", The exhibition questions issues of gender and politics.

From 2007 on Knes concentrated more on a reflection about the photographic image within his work, by using video, collages and text. Lately he was involved in bookprojects about the Martin Wong – Collection, Julie Ault's art-collection and Hannah Arendt's Library.
