= Fantastic Man (magazine) =

Fashion magazine published in the Netherlands

- Filmmaker Spike Jonze on the cover of issue 18, autumn/winter 2013
- Editors: Jop van Bennekom and Gert Jonkers
- Categories: Fashion, Art, Culture
- Frequency: Biannual
- Publisher: Top Publishers
- Founded: 2005
- Country: The Netherlands
- Based in: Amsterdam
- Language: English
- Website: www.fantasticman.com
- ISSN: 1574-8979

Fantastic Man is a semi-annual men's fashion magazine which was launched in 2005. It presents men's fashion by detailed interviews with male celebrities and intellectuals from many different backgrounds.

The magazine has been lauded for its art direction, winning the British D&AD award for Best Magazine & Newspaper Design in 2008.

It is published in Amsterdam by Top Publishers, which also publishes Butt magazine, and edited by editor-in-chief Gert Jonkers. Fantastic Man launched a website with daily content in 2009 and a sister publication aimed at women, The Gentlewoman, in March 2010.
