= Maria Pergay =

French designer (1930–2023)

Maria Pergay (28 October 1930 – 31 October 2023) was a French pioneer of stainless steel objects and furniture. She had said that she favored steel for its strength and availability, among other qualities.

Pergay made her name in the 60s when she was approached by Uginox, represented by Gérard Martel, a French stainless-steel company, to design small decorative objects. In return, she designed a collection of furniture showcased at the Maison Jardin gallery in 1968. The collection included two metal furnishings, the Flying Carpet Daybed and the Ring Chair, described as inspired by the spiraling form of an orange peel. “I was peeling an orange for my children, and thought how nice it looked,” Pergay told The New York Times. Her stool Vague (1968) is included in the Metropolitan Museum of Art collection.

Pergay has been commissioned by Givenchy, Pierre Cardin, Fendi, Christian Dior, Jacques Heim and Salvador Dalí. Better known in Europe, where her work has been exhibited since 1971 after a first show curated by Air France, the New York gallery Demisch Danant hosted her first retrospective in 2006. Her installation Metamorphosis was exhibited at the 2013 Design Miami fair.

Pergay died on 31 October 2023, at the age of 93.
