= Henk Ovink =

Dutch diplomat

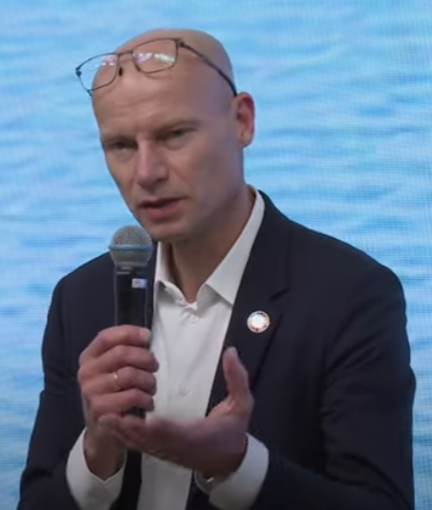
- Speaking at the World Economic Forum's Annual Meeting of the New Champions 2023
- Born: 8 November 1967 (age 58); Doetinchem, Netherlands
- Occupation: Diplomat

Henk Ovink (born 8 November 1967, in Doetinchem, Netherlands) is a Dutch water advocate and flood expert. From March 2015 until August 2023, he served as special envoy for International Water Affairs appointed by the Cabinet of the Netherlands. He was succeeded by Meike van Ginneken.
