= Robert Willson (artist) =

American sculptor

Robert William Willson (Mertzon, Texas, May 28, 1912 – San Antonio, June 1, 2000) was an American artist and sculptor notable for his creative use of solid glass. He was one of the first Americans to work with solid glass in partnership with the glass blowers of Murano, Italy.

Educated in the American Southwest and in Mexico, he also studied glass in Murano, Italy. He had an especially close artistic association with Venice, spending thirty-seven summers there making glass sculptures.
