= Swiss Institute Contemporary Art New York =

Non-profit contemporary art institution

Coordinates: 40.725656°N 73.991794°W

Swiss Institute / Contemporary Art New York
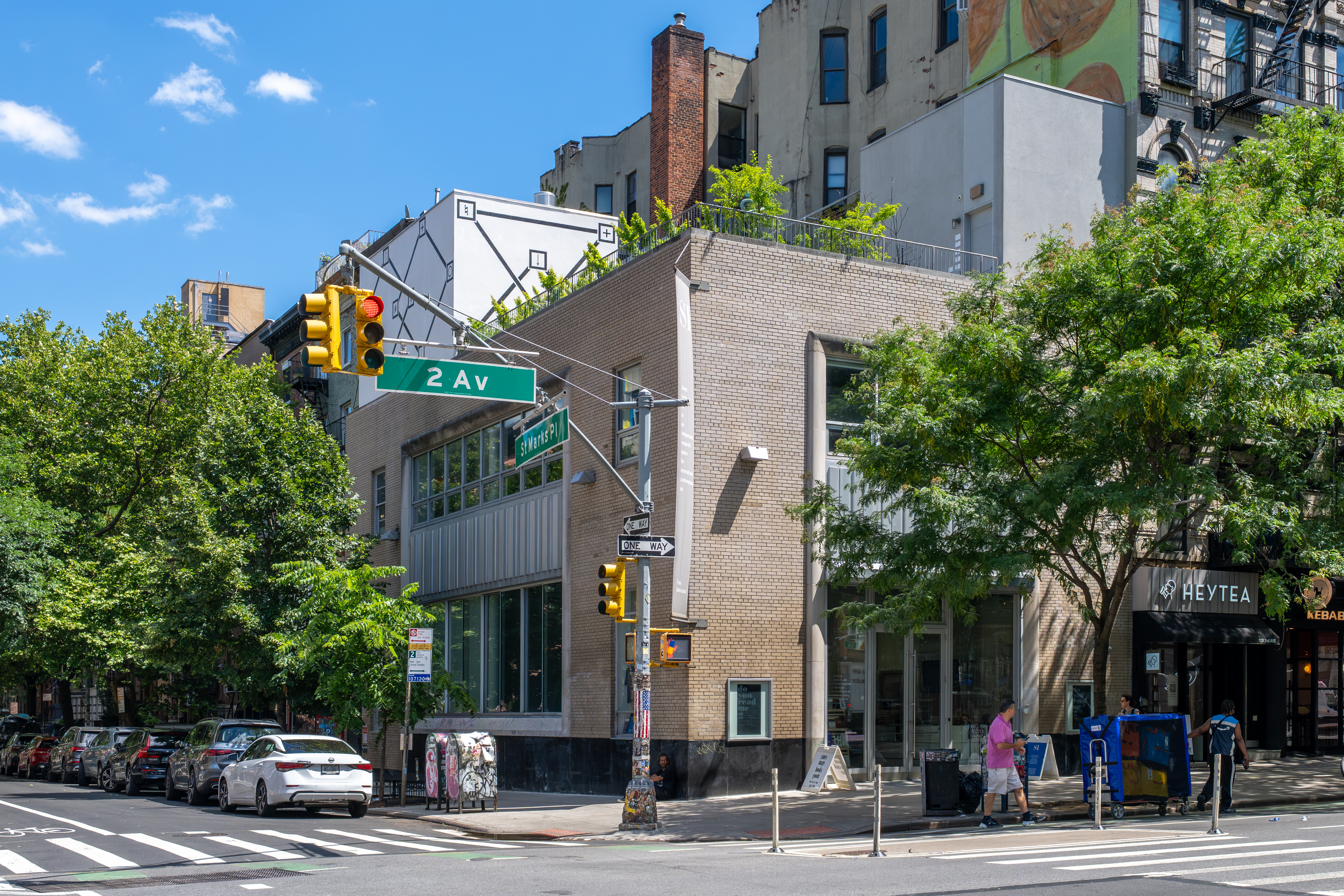
- (2026)
- Established: 1986
- Location: 38 St. Marks Place, New York City
- Type: Contemporary art
- Director: Stefanie Hessler
- Website: https://www.swissinstitute.net/

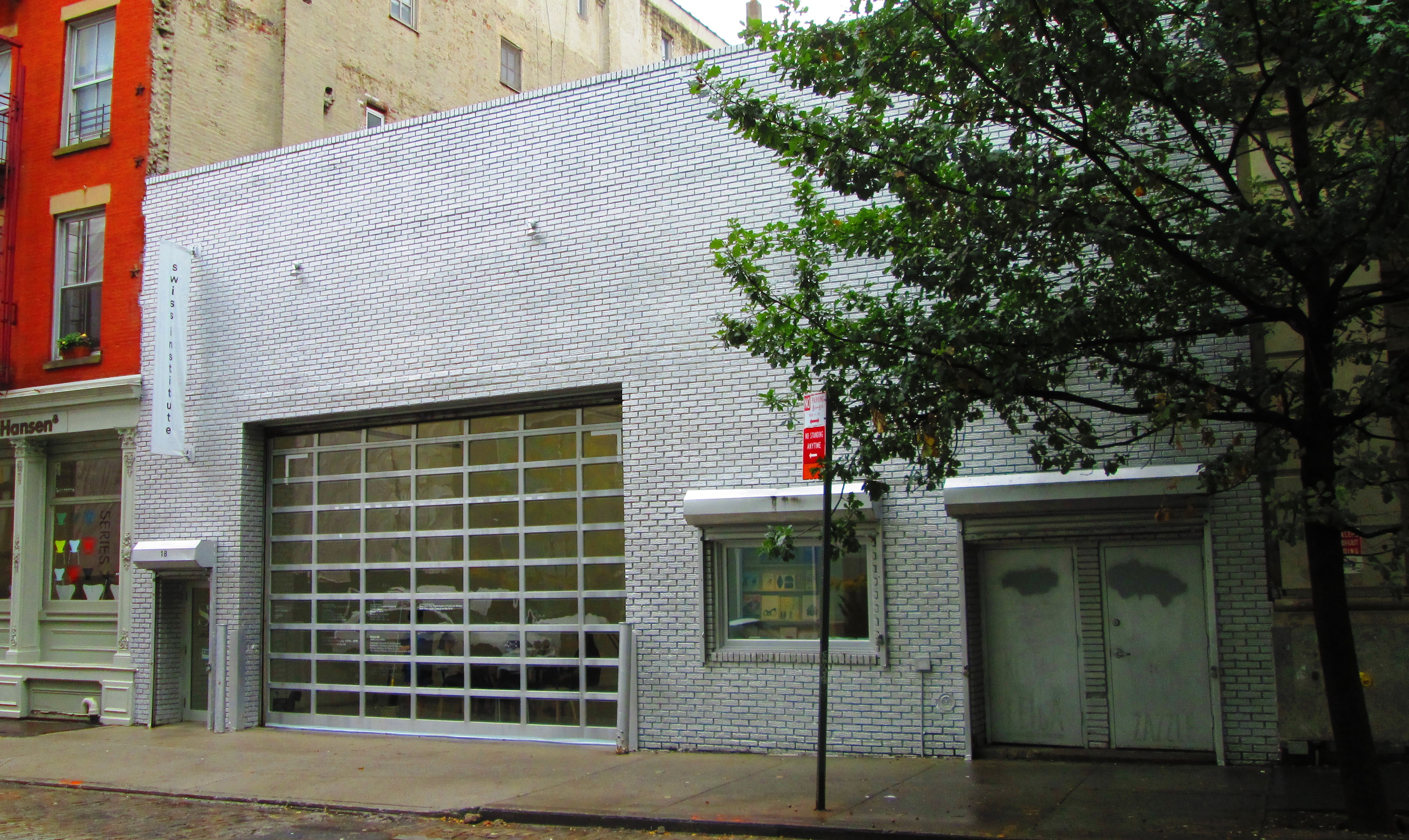
Swiss Institute at 18 Wooster Street in 2014

Swiss Institute / Contemporary Art New York (SI) is an independent non-profit contemporary art organization founded in 1986. SI is located at 38 St. Marks Place, at the corner of Second Avenue, in the East Village neighborhood of Manhattan in New York City.

== History ==
The Swiss Institute was founded in 1986 by a group of Swiss expats looking to highlight their country’s artists and culture. It originally had headquarters at the Swiss Townhouse at 35 West 67th Street. It moved to the third floor of the New Era Building at 495 Broadway in Soho in 1994.

From 2011 to 2016, the Swiss Institute was located in a 460 m^{2} (5,000 sq ft) space at 18 Wooster Street. During that time, it showed its inaugural design exhibition in 2014. In addition to hosting art exhibitions, the space became the venue for the fall/winter 2016 presentation of New York City-based accessories brand Mansur Gavriel, which enlisted a handful of collaborators to turn the space into a domestic scene.

From 2016, the Swiss Institute staged shows at Swiss In Situ, a temporary 460 m^{2} (5,000 sq ft) space at 102 Franklin Street in TriBeCa.

Since 2018, the Swiss Institute has been located in a 700 m^{2} (7,500 sq ft) space at 38 St. Marks Place and Second Avenue. Formerly a bank, the four-story building was re-designed by Selldorf Architects and includes exhibition space, an education and public programs floor, a library, and a usable rooftop. Exhibitions include visual and performing arts, design, and architecture, with public programs spanning a wide range of topics. SI also has weekly public programming and education classes. Admission is free.

Printed Matter, Inc. St. Mark’s bookstore is located on the ground floor.

== Leadership ==
=== Directors ===
- 1987–1992: Ziba Ardalan de Weck
- 1992–1997: Carin Kuoni
- 1997–2000: Annette Schindler
- 2000–2006: Marc-Olivier Wahler
- 2006–2013: Gianni Jetzer
- 2013–2021: Simon Castets
- 2022–present: Stefanie Hessler

=== Chairs of the Board ===
- 2002–2016: Fabienne Abrecht
- 2016–present: Maja Hoffmann

== Awards ==
At its annual fundraiser, the Swiss Institute has recognized several individuals with the SI Award, including the following:

- 1996: Bob Lutz
- 1997: Daniel Vasella
- 1998: Leonard Lauder
- 2000: Ulrich Bremi
- 2001: Adolf Ogi
- 2003: Michael Ringier
- 2005: Thomas W. Bechtler
- 2006: Uli Sigg
- 2007: Iwan Wirth
- 2008: Maja Hoffmann
- 2009: Bice Curiger
- 2010: Sam Keller
- 2011: Hans-Ulrich Obrist
- 2012: Eric Syz
- 2014: Ursula Hauser
- 2015: Dominique Lévy
- 2016: Eva Presenhuber
- 2017: Yves Béhar
- 2018: Herzog & de Meuron

Since 2003, the Swiss Institute has also been honoring artists with the SI Artist Tributes:

- 2003: Christian Marclay
- 2004: Ugo Rondinone
- 2005: Olaf Breuning
- 2006: Christoph Büchel
- 2007: Shirana Shahbazi
- 2008: Roman Signer
- 2009: Peter Fischli & David Weiss
- 2010: Pipilotti Rist
- 2011: John Armleder
- 2012: Thomas Hirschhorn
- 2013: Sylvie Fleury
- 2014: Valentin Carron
- 2015: Pamela Rosenkranz
- 2016: Olivier Mosset, Jordan Wolfson
- 2017: Mai-Thu Perret, Niele Toroni
- 2018: Latifa Echakhch, Walter Pfeiffer
- 2019: Christina Forrer, Rudolf Stingel
- 2021: Jill Mulleady, Nicolas Party
