= Apartamento =

Spanish design magazine

- Categories: Interior Design
- Frequency: Biannual
- Publisher: Apartamento Publishing S.L.
- Founder: Omar Sosa; Nacho Alegre; Marco Velardi
- Founded: 2008
- First issue: April 2008
- Country: Spain
- Based in: Barcelona
- Website: www.apartamentomagazine.com
- ISSN: 2013-0198

Apartamento is an interiors magazine founded in 2008 in Barcelona. It is published biannually and features people, their homes, and the lives they lead inside them every day.

The magazine debuted at Milan’s 2008 Design Week.

== History ==
The idea for Apartamento originated from the founders vision to create an interiors publication that felt more personal and authentic than existing design magazines, and as a way to portrait an international group of people all around the globe that shared similar interests.

In 2008, the trio launched Apartamento from Barcelona, initially operating from Alegre's apartment and mostly over skype and MSN chat. The first issue, published in April of that year, was printed in 5,000 copies, which quickly sold out. It featured Mike Mills, a founding member of the alternative rock band R.E.M., and members of the English indie rock band Mystery Jets.

== Concept ==
Apartamento is, in part, a reaction to the sterile and impersonal-looking homes often portrayed in interior-design and architectural magazines. Instead, the team wanted to showcase living spaces with a more "lived-in feel", filled with character and personal expression. The magazine had a successful start after a supporting article at T Magazine by writer Nick Currie that defined it as "The interiors magazine 'post-materialists' have been waiting for"

== Reception ==
Apartamento has developed a strong following. It is read in 45 countries and regularly sells out all of the copies produced.
