= Butt (magazine) =

English-language gay magazine from the Netherlands

BUTT

- Cover of Butt 23 (Spring 2008)
- Editors: Gert Jonkers and Jop van Bennekom
- Categories: Gay
- Frequency: Semiannual
- Circulation: 24,000
- First issue: Spring 2001
- Country: Netherlands
- Language: English
- Website: buttmagazine.com

BUTT is a biannual magazine that features photography and interviews about alternative gay and queer culture and sexuality. Historically, the magazine has been marketed as for gay men. The magazine, originating in the Netherlands, features interviews, photographs, articles, and advertisements that document trends and lifestyles within the gay, lesbian, transgender, and queer community.

== History ==
BUTT was founded in 2001 by Gert Jonkers and Jop van Bennekom. Its first issue showed German fashion designer Bernhard Willhelm in nude portraits taken by Wolfgang Tillmans.

The magazine is available worldwide. In the United States and the United Kingdom, it was available at American Apparel stores, among other places.

It ceased print publication in 2011, and relaunched in September 2022 under the editorial leadership of writer and editor Andrew Pasquier as Chief Editor.

== Content ==
BUTT has featured artists such as Casey Spooner, Michael Stipe, John Waters, Arca, Heinz Peter Knes, Leilah Weinraub, Edmund White, Terence Koh, Walter Pfeiffer, Hilton Als, and Slava Mogutin. Readers submitted interviews, letters, photographs, or articles. Subscribers were referred to as "Buttheads" and could join the Butthead community officially through the magazine's website.

== Reception and impact ==
In 2005, The Guardian named BUTT as one of its top twenty magazines. As of 2008, it had an estimated worldwide circulation of 24,000. In 2014, Taschen released Butt Forever, an anthology of some of the magazine's highlights since its inception.

BUTT has been praised for its unabashed sexual and non-sexual portrayals of men, which emphasize equal opportunity in depictions of all people in print. The magazine has been lauded for its unique, candid approach to interviews, which may be conducted by anyone.
