= List of Harper's Bazaar España cover models =

This list of Harper's Bazaar España cover models (2010–present) is a catalog of cover models who have appeared on the cover of Harper's Bazaar España, the Spanish edition of American fashion magazine Harper's Bazaar.

== 2010s ==
=== 2010 ===
Issue	Cover model	Photographer
March	Carmen Kass	Nico Bustos
April	Vlada Roslyakova	Nico Bustos
May	Daria Werbowy	Nico Bustos
June	Kim Noorda	Txema Yeste
July/August	Tanya Dziahileva	Nico Bustos
September	Bianca Balti	Txema Yeste
October	Enikő Mihalik	Nico Bustos
November	Missy Rayder	Nico Bustos
December	Tanga Moreau	Nico Bustos

=== 2011 ===
Issue	Cover model	Photographer
January	Sheila Márquez	Nico Bustos
February	Alessandra Ambrosio	Nico Bustos
March	Anne Vyalitsyna	Txema Yeste
April	Constance Jablonski	Nico Bustos
May	Bambi Northwood-Blyth	Nico Bustos
June	Anna de Rijk	Txema Yeste
July/August	Elisa Sednaoui	Nico Bustos
September	Jacquelyn Jablonski	Nico Bustos
October	Aymeline Valade	Txema Yeste
November	Angela Lindvall	Nico Bustos
December	Aline Weber	Txema Yeste

=== 2012 ===
Issue	Cover model	Photographer
January	Candice Swanepoel	Koray Birand
February	Kasia Struss	Nico Bustos
March	Jessica Stam	Txema Yeste
April	Izabel Goulart	Nico Bustos
May	Liya Kebede	Txema Yeste
June	Enikő Mihalik	Nico Bustos
July/August	Hanaa Ben Abdesslem	Txema Yeste
September	Guinevere Van Seenus	Nico Bustos
October	Bette Franke	Nico Bustos
November	Eugenia Volodina	Txema Yeste
December	Heather Marks	Xevi Muntané

=== 2013 ===
Issue	Cover model	Photographer
January	Carmen Kass	Nico Bustos
February	Ginta Lapiņa	Txema Yeste
March	Lara Stone	Kacper Kasprzyk
April	Daphne Groeneveld	Txema Yeste
May	Farida Khelfa; Inès de La Fressange; Lauren Hutton; Yasmin Le Bon	Nico Bustos
June	Cindy Crawford	Nagi Sakai
July/August	Crystal Renn	Nico Bustos
September	Karen Elson	Karl Lagerfeld
October	Naomi Campbell	Xevi Muntané
November	Georgia May Jagger	Xevi Muntané
December	Bette Franke	Nagi Sakai

=== 2014 ===
Issue	Cover model	Photographer
January	Miranda Kerr	Terry Richardson
February	Adriana Lima	Nico Bustos
March	Eva Herzigová	Nico Bustos
April	Zuzanna Bijoch	Marcin Tyszka
May	Anna de Rijk	Bela Adler & Salvatore Fresneta
June	Barbara Palvin	Xevi Muntané
July/August	Audrey Hepburn; Brigitte Bardot; Coco Chanel; Elizabeth Taylor	Richard Avedon
September	Claudia Schiffer	Sebastian Faena
October	Tosca Dekker	Bela Adler & Salvatore Fresneta
November	Toni Garrn	Michelangelo Di Battista
December	Irina Kravchenko	Alfonso Ohnur

=== 2015 ===
Issue	Cover model	Photographer
January/February	Manon Leloup	Alfonso Ohnur
March	Mariacarla Boscono	Txema Yeste
April	Isabeli Fontana	Alique
May	Constance Jablonski	Nagi Sakai
June	Karolína Kurková	Hans Feurer
July	Blanca Padilla & José María Manzanares	Thomas Whiteside
August	Laetitia Casta	Alique
September	Katy Perry	Jean-Paul Goude
October	Fei Fei Sun; Sasha Luss; Vanessa Moody	Txema Yeste
November	Aymeline Valade	Thomas Whiteside
December	Irina Shayk	Norman Jean Roy

=== 2016 ===
Issue	Cover model	Photographer
January	Esther Cañadas	Hunter & Gatti
January	Marina Pérez	Gonzalo Machado
January	Steffy Argelich	Zoltan Tombor
January	Vanessa Lorenzo	Richard Phibbs
February	Penélope Cruz	Cedric Buchet
March	Milla Jovovich	Francesco Carrozzini
April	Bella Hadid	Txema Yeste
May	Alessandra Ambrosio	Txema Yeste
June	Guinevere Van Seenus	Nagi Sakai
July	Isabeli Fontana	Thomas Whiteside
August	Karmen Pedaru	Guy Aroch
September	Kanye West & Kim Kardashian	Karl Lagerfeld
October	Joan Smalls	Txema Yeste
November	Ashley Graham	Cedric Buchet
December	Natalia Vodianova	Thomas Whiteside

=== 2017 ===
Issue	Cover model	Photographer
January	Hailey Baldwin & Jon Kortajarena	Thomas Whiteside
February	Madonna	Luigi & Iango
March	Christy Turlington	Norman Jean Roy
April	Stella Maxwell	Thomas Whiteside
May	Toni Garrn	Guy Aroch
June	Kati Nescher	Sonia Sieff
July	Adriana Lima	Vincent Peters
August	Daphne Groeneveld	Zoltan Tombor
September	Candice Swanepoel	Brigitte Lacombe
October	Amber Valletta	Greg Kadel
November	Nadja Bender	Guy Aroch
December	Joséphine Le Tutour	Zoltan Tombor

=== 2018 ===
Issue	Cover model	Photographer
January	Carolyn Murphy	Nino Muñoz
February	Julia van Os	Paul Empson
March	Pauline Ducruet	Greg Kadel
April	Ophélie Guillermand	Greg Kadel
May	Catherine McNeil	Vincent Peters
June	Anna Mila	Rosa Copado
July	Hailey Clauson	Paul Empson
August	Toni Garrn	Adam Franzino
September	Paris Jackson	Mario Sorrenti
October	Bette Franke	Paul Bellaart
November	Vanessa Axente	Agata Pospieszynska
December	Sarah Brannon	Philip Gay

=== 2019 ===
Issue	Cover model	Photographer
January	Gisele Bündchen	Nino Muñoz
February	Vivien Solari	Philip Gay
March	Tara Lynn	Van Mossevelde + N
April	Marine Vacth	Van Mossevelde + N
May	Signe Veiteberg	Agata Pospieszynska
June	Karolína Kurková	Juankr
July	Alexandra Agoston	Yulia Gorbachenko
August	Blanca Padilla	Paul Bellaart
September	Kate Moss	Mario Sorrenti
October	Alexandra Micu	Olivia Frolich
November	Carole Bouquet	Xavi Gordo
November	Mafalda of Bulgaria; Rossy de Palma	Javier Biosca
November	Sharon Stone	Juankr
December	Julia Bergshoeff	Xavi Gordo

== 2020s ==
=== 2020 ===
Issue	Cover model	Photographer
January	Toni Garrn	Yulia Gorbachenko
February	Joan Smalls	Xavi Gordo
March	Carmen Kass	Xavi Gordo
April	Vanessa Axente	Xavi Gordo
May	Inés Sastre	Xavi Gordo
June	Lily Aldridge	David Roemer
July/August	Helena Christensen	Helena Christensen
September	Rihanna	Gray Sorrenti
October	Cristina Iglesias, Victoria Iglesias	Javiar Biosca
October	Candice Swanepoel	David Roemer
November	Valentina Sampaio, Giorgio Armani	Xavi Gordo
December	Vanessa Paradis	Xavi Gordo

=== 2021 ===
Issue	Cover model	Photographer
January	Jessica Chastain	David Roemer
February	Constance Jablonski	Xavi Gordo
March	Deva Cassel	Xavi Gordo
April	Élise Crombez	Xavi Gordo
April	Kesewa Aboah	Rosa Copado
May	Marina Pérez	Xavi Gordo
June	Karmen Pedaru	Xavi Gordo
July/August	Esther Cañadas	Xavi Gordo
September	Shalom Harlow	David Roemer
October	C. Tangana	Javier Biosca
November	Blanca Padilla	Xavi Gordo
December	Tina Kunakey	Xavi Gordo

=== 2022 ===
Issue	Cover model	Photographer
January	Natalia Vodianova	Nicolas Valois
February	Úrsula Corberó	Javier Biosca
March	Carlota Casiraghi	
April	Valentina Sampaio	Rocio Ramos
May		
June	Luna Bijl	Xavi Gordo
July/August	Priyanka Chopra	Xavi Gordo
September	Ester Expósito	Javier Biosca
October		
November	Sharon Stone	Michael Muller
December		

=== 2023 ===
Issue	Cover model	Photographer
January	Lily Collins	Juan Kr
February	Tamara Falcó	
February	Luz Casal	Javier Biosca
February	Sabine Getty	Rocio Ramos
February	Valentina Sampaio	Xavi Gordo
February	Helena Christensen	Vladimir Marti
February	Milena Smit	Juan Kr
March	Gabriela Hearst, Leiva	Carlos de la Reina
April	Anna Cleveland, Pat Cleveland	Vladimir Marti
May	Christina Ricci	Vladimir Marti
June	Esther Cañadas	Vladimir Marti
July/August	Hana Jirickova	Xavi Gordo
September	Kendall Jenner	Mario Sorrenti
September	Monica Bellucci	
October	Emmanuelle Seigner	Dusan Reljin
October	Africa Peñalver	Nicolas Valois
October	Paloma San Basilio	Rocio Ramos
November	Miriam Sánchez	Javier Biosca
December	Eva Longoria	Jenny Gage + Tom Betteron
December	Marisa Berenson	Javier Biosca
December	Elle Macpherson	Darren McDonald
December	Indya Moore	Juan Kr
December	Alexia Putellas	Vladimir Marti
December	Alexa Chung	Josh Shinner
December	Rossy de Palma	Javier Biosca
December	Juana Martin	Leticia Diaz de la Morena

=== 2024 ===
Issue	Cover model	Photographer
January	Nathy Peluso	Javier Biosca
February	Sharon Stone	Eric Michael Roy
March	Jessica Chastain	
April	Sydney Sweeney	
May	Baroness Carmen Cervera	Javier Biosca
June	Aitana	Xavi Gordo
July/August	Eva Herzigová	Xavi Gordo
September	Úrsula Corberó	Pierre-Ange Carlotti
September	Manu Ríos	Juan Kr
October	Caroline de Maigret	
November	Constance Jablonski	Xavi Gordo
December	Teresa Perales	Alvaro Garcia
December	Camille Miceli	Javier Biosca
December	Jerry Hall	Josh Shinner
December	Chimamanda Ngozi Adichie	Juan Kr
December	Rosario	Vladimir Martí
December	Elizabeth Hurley	Xavi Gordo
December	Diane Kruger	Pablo Saez

=== 2025 ===
Issue	Cover model	Photographer
January	Mayowa Adagunduro	Vladimir Martí
February	Cate Blanchett	Nico Bustos
March	Gal Gadot	David Roemer
March	Zoe Saldaña	Larissa Hoffmann
April	Carla Bruni	Philip Gay
May	Jourdan Dunn	Javier Biosca
June	Elsa Pataky	Vladimir Marti
July/August	Carmen Kass	Rocio Ramos
September	Sharon Stone	Eric Michael Roy
September	Esther Cañadas	Xavi Gordo
September	Kate Moss	David Sims
October	Giedre Dukauskaite	Javier Biosca
November	Deva Cassel	Pablo Sáez
December	Bianca Jagger	Tom Munro
December	Gilda Ambrosio, Giorgia Tordini	Javier Biosca
December	Simone Biles	Juan Kr
December	Bad Gyal	Txema Yeste
December	Laura Pausini	Xavi Gordo
December	María Pedraza	Alvaro Garcia
December	Emma Roberts	Juan Kr

=== 2026 ===
Issue	Cover model	Photographer
January	Ángela Molina	Carlos Megia
January	Guitarricadelafuente	Javier Biosca
February	Adriana Lima	David Roemer
March	Milena Smit	Xavi Gordo
April	Rolf Schrader	Javier Biosca
May	Naty Abascal	Javier Biosca
May	Laura Ponte	Javier Biosca
June	Paloma Manes	Javier Biosca
June	Hana Jirickova	Vladimir Marti
July/August	Georgina Rodríguez	Javier Biosca
September	Ester Expósito	Alvaro Garcia
October	Monica Bellucci	Rocio Ramos
October	Uma Thurman	David Roemer
November	Ana de Armas	Pepe Lobez
November	Carmen Thyssen-Bornemisza	Alvaro Garcia
December	Naty Abascal	
December	Esther Cañadas	
December	Kim Cattrall	
December	Karen Elson	
December	Clara Galle	
December	Farida Khelfa	
December	Victoria Luengo	
December	J.J. Martin	
December	Nathy Peluso	

== See also ==
- List of L'Officiel España cover models
- List of Vogue España cover models
