= Alfie Curtis =

British actor (1930–2017)

- Alfie Curtis in Bowler (1973)
- Born: 28 July 1930; Stepney, London, United Kingdom
- Died: 30 November 2017 (aged 87); Billericay, Essex, United Kingdom
- Occupation: Actor
- Years active: 1973–1986
- Notable work: Star Wars

Alfie Curtis (28 July 1930 – 30 November 2017) was a British actor. He appeared in a number of television and film roles and was best known for playing Dr. Cornelius Evazan in Star Wars (1977).

== Life ==
Curtis was born in Stepney, London on 28 July 1930.

He was an enthusiastic follower of football and supported Arsenal F.C. For a time, Curtis played as a semi-professional footballer and once played in a match against Arsenal.

== Career ==
Curtis was noted for his "rugged" features. He landed a number of acting parts that demanded a rough physical appearance through Ugly Models, a London modelling agency that specializes in artists and models who do not conform to typical standards of idealized beauty.

Most of Curtis's appearances were in minor roles in British television series. He played the part of Matt Beckett in the TV police drama Cribb (1980–1981) and Ted in the TV adaptation of J.B. Priestley's Lost Empires (1986). His cinema roles included an appearance in David Lynch's 1980 film The Elephant Man in which he played the part of a milkman.

He was best known for a small part in the 1977 space opera film Star Wars, in which he played the role of insane Dr. Cornelius Evazan, a mentally unstable criminal with a heavily scarred face who violently confronts Luke Skywalker in the Mos Eisley Cantina scene. Curtis' character states "I have the death sentence on twelve systems!" In the brief bar brawl, Evazan's partner, Ponda Baba, gets his arm chopped off by Obi-Wan Kenobi, the first use of a lightsaber in combat in the Star Wars franchise.

== Death ==
Curtis died on 30 November 2017 at the age of 87 in Billericay, Essex.

== Filmography ==
Film
Year	Title	Role	Notes
1977	Star Wars	Dr. Cornelius Evazan	Uncredited
1980	The Wildcats of St. Trinian's	Taxi driver	
1980	The Elephant Man	Milkman	
1981	Take It or Leave It	Vicar	Documentary
Television
Year	Title	Role	Notes
1973	Bowler	Rocky / Alfie	2 episodes
1975	Larry Grayson	Man in Line-up / Cafe Customer / Sailor	5 episodes
1979	The Jim Davidson Show	Himself	1 episode
1980	Grange Hill	Gateman	1 episode
1980	Fox	Conk	1 episode
1980–1981	Cribb	Landlord / Matt Beckett	2 episodes
1981	Lady Killers	Mr . Waters	1 episode
1982	Legacy of Murder	Assistant thug	
1982	Q.E.D.	Referee	1 episode
1982	The Gentle Touch	Gaffer	1 episode
1983	Jemima Shore Investigates	Vic	1 episode
1984	Tucker's Luck	Steve	2 episodes
1985	The Bill	Bernie	1 episode
1986	Lost Empires	Ted	1 episode, (final appearance)

Music Videos

- Curtis makes a brief appearance as a subway bystander in the English ska band Madness' 1979 Madness music video (cover of Prince Buster's song), at 00:26.
- Curtis also plays the role of one of the two villains who chase the hero (Morten Harket) in the Norwegian synth-pop band a-ha's 1985 Take On Me music video. Curtis, like other characters in the video, is rendered in pencil-sketch animation style.
