= Scout Model & Talent Agency =

Modeling agency

Scout Model & Talent Agency is a modeling and creative agency founded in 2010 by Ryan Lippert and Mike Jones. Scout started in San Francisco and expanded to the Los Angeles market in 2018. They represent models, influencers, and creatives. In 2016 Scout opened their Creatives Division with representation of photographers, makeup artists, and other various creative artists. They believe diversity should not be an anomaly, but rather an undisputed, celebrated fact. To this day, Scout is one of the top model agencies in the Bay Area.

== See also ==
- List of modeling agencies
