= Veiteberg =

Veiteberg is a surname. Notable people with the surname include:

- Kari Veiteberg (born 1961), Norwegian Lutheran theologian
- Signe Veiteberg (born 1999), Norwegian fashion model
