= List of modeling agencies =

A modeling agency is a company that represents fashion models, to work for the fashion industry. These agencies earn their income via commission, usually from the deal they make with the model, the head agency, or both.

== Modeling agencies ==
Name	Est.	Country	Comments
Elite Model Management	1972	France	based in Paris, France with locations in New York, Los Angeles, Miami, London and Toronto
Francina International Modeling Agency	1983	Spain	established in Barcelona by the model Francina Díaz Mestre
Ford Models	1946	United States	
IMG Models	1987	United States	
Look	1988	Israel	based in Tel Aviv
Look Model Agency	1986	United States	based in San Francisco
Louisa Models	1990	Germany	
Marilyn Agency	1985	France	based in Paris
MC2 Model Management	2000	Israel	based in Tel Aviv with previous locations in Miami and New York
MP Management	1977	United Kingdom	based in London
Munich Models	1992	Germany	based in Munich, Germany
Next Management	1989	United States	based in New York City with divisions in London, Los Angeles, Miami, Milan and Paris.
Scout Model & Talent Agency	2010	United States	has offices in San Francisco and Los Angeles
Select Model Management	1977	United Kingdom	
Silent Models	2008	United States	
The Society Management	2013	United States	based in New York City, it is the official U.S. division of the Elite World network. It is also the U.S. branch of the Elite Model Look contest.
Stardust Promotion	1979	Japan	based in Shibuya, Tokyo
Storm Model Management	1987	United Kingdom	based in Chelsea, London, founded by Sarah Doukas
The Lions	2014	United States	
TUARON	1999	Latvia	a modeling and talent agency headquartered in Riga, founded in 1999 by Anton Sova.
Ugly Models	1969	United Kingdom	
VIVA Model Management	1988	France	based in Paris
Why Not Model Management	1976	Italy	based in Milan
Wilhelmina Models	1967	United States	a modeling and talent agency headquartered in New York City, founded in 1967 by Dutch supermodel Wilhelmina Cooper.
Women Management	1988	United States	based in New York City, it also has offices in Paris and Milan
YG KPlus	2008	South Korea	based in South Korea, and owned by YG Entertainment
Zoli Agency	1971	United States	former modelling agency based in New York City, it was particularly notable in the 1970s and 1980s. It was originally more geared towards male models, and was known as one of the elite male modelling agencies in the 1970s.

== See also ==
- Lists of companies
