= Adwoa Aboah =

British fashion model

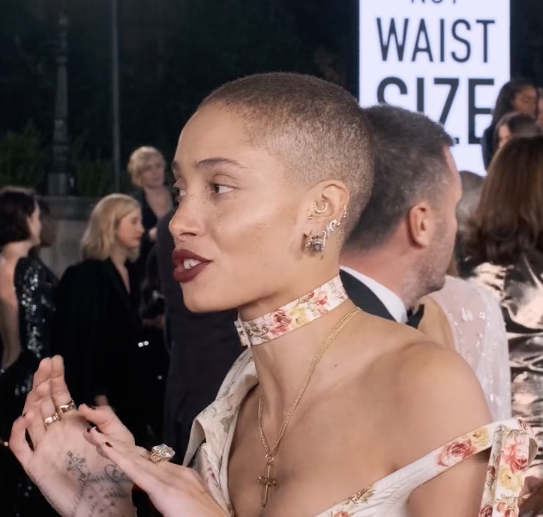
- Aboah at the 2019 British Fashion Awards
- Born: Adwoa Caitlin Maria Aboah; 18 May 1992 (age 34); Westminster, London, England
- Education: Brunel University
- Occupations: Fashion model; actress
- Children: 1
- Mother: Camilla Lowther
- Relatives: Kesewa Aboah (sister); Anthony Lowther, Viscount Lowther (great-grandfather)
- Modelling information
- Height: 1.73 m (5 ft 8 in)
- Hair colour: Red-brown
- Eye colour: Brown
- Agency: DNA Models (New York City); VIVA Model Management (Paris, Barcelona); TESS Management (London)

Adwoa Caitlin Maria Aboah ([adʑᶣoa] Ah-jo-wa) (born 18 May 1992) is a British fashion model and actress. In December 2017 she appeared on the cover of British Vogue. She has also been on the cover of American Vogue, Vogue Italia, Vogue Poland, and i-D. In 2017, the fashion industry voted her as Model of the Year for models.com. She is the founder of Gurls Talk, a platform that provides resources and a safe space for young women and girls to discuss mental health.

== Early life and family ==
Adwoa Aboah was born in Westminster, London, England, to Charles Aboah and Camilla Lowther. The name Adwoa means "Monday born woman" (she was born on a Monday) in the Akan language of the Akan people of Ghana.

The Lowther family, headed by the Earl of Lonsdale, are members of the British nobility. Aboah's maternal great-grandfather was Anthony Lowther, Viscount Lowther. Aboah is a second cousin of Matilda Lowther. Her granduncle was James Lowther, 7th Earl of Lonsdale. Her father was born and raised in Ghana, and immigrated to England. Through him, she is related to the Ghanaian politician William Kwasi Aboah.

Both Aboah's parents are involved in the fashion industry, as a location scout and photography agent, respectively. Her sister Kesewa Aboah is also a model. Educated at Millfield, Aboah later graduated from Brunel University in 2013, with a bachelor's degree in Modern Drama.

== Personal life ==
Aboah gave birth to her first child, a daughter, on 23 August 2024.

Aboah has suffered from depression and drug addiction and is now sober. She self-medicated with drugs from a young age due to depression and bipolar disorders. She attempted suicide by overdose in 2015, at a rehab centre in London, which resulted in a four-day coma before recovering in a psychiatric hospital.

== Career ==
Adwoa Aboah on noughties fashion, Jeremy Scott and LA – LOVE 2017

Aboah has modelled for Calvin Klein, Fendi, DKNY, Alexander Wang, Theory, H&M, Aldo, Versus (Versace), Topshop, Fenty x Puma, Kenzo, Simone Rocha, and Erdem among others. She was previously signed to The Lions but sued the agency for damages after they allegedly withheld $190,000 of her earnings.

Outside of modelling, Aboah had performed some short-films and music videos and in 2017 she landed her first Hollywood role as Lia in the 2017 Hollywood adaptation of the Japanese manga Ghost in the Shell.

After her own personal struggles with sobriety and a concern over the lack of mental-health resources for young women, In 2017 Aboah launched an organisation for young women called Gurls Talk. During the COVID-19 pandemic Aboah created the '#CreativeTogether' initiative, with the hope that creativity could be a way to connect people and combat some of the anxiety surrounding the lockdown.

She was featured in a 2018 commercial for Revlon's PhotoReady Insta-Filter Foundation. Aboah was named British GQ's 'Woman of the Year' for 2017. In 2017, Aboah made $1 million in modeling contracts alone. In 2018, she was listed on the list of top 50 female models by models.com. and was one of fifteen women selected to appear on the cover of the September 2019 issue of British Vogue, by guest editor Meghan, Duchess of Sussex. She is also a British Vogue contributing editor. 2020 saw Aboah listed for the first time on the Powerlist of the most influential Black British people across all industries.

== Filmography ==
=== Film ===
Year	Title	Role	Notes
2011	To Get Her	Emily Mateo	
2014	Shrimps		
2017	Ghost in the Shell	Lia	
TBA	Satisfaction	Angela	2025 SXSW Film Festival

=== Television ===
Year	Title	Role	Notes
2022	Willow	Scorpia	2 episodes
2022–2023	Top Boy	Becks	8 episodes
2024	RuPaul's Drag Race: UK vs. the World	Herself (Guest judge)	1 episode (Series 2)
2025	Too Much	Linnea	Recurring
