= Anthony Lowther, Viscount Lowther =

British courtier (1896–1949)

Viscount Lowther JP DL

Lord Lieutenant of Westmorland
- In office 1939–1945
- Preceded by: Stanley Hughes le Fleming
- Succeeded by: James Winstanley Cropper

Personal details
- Born: Anthony Edward Lowther; 24 September 1896
- Died: 6 October 1949 (aged 53)
- Spouse: Muriel Frances Farrar (m. 1922)
- Parent(s): Lancelot Lowther, 6th Earl of Lonsdale; Gwendoline Sophia Alice Sheffield

Anthony Edward Lowther, Viscount Lowther JP DL (24 September 1896 – 6 October 1949) was an English courtier and soldier.

== Early life ==
Anthony Edward Lowther was the eldest son of Lancelot Lowther, 6th Earl of Lonsdale by his first wife, the former Gwendoline Sophia Alice Sheffield (1869–1921). After the death of his mother in 1921, his father remarried to Sybil Beatrix Feetham, the only child of Maj Gen Edward Feetham of Farmwood.

His maternal grandparents were the former Priscilla Dumaresq (daughter of Lt. Col. Henry Dumaresq) and Sir Robert Sheffield, 5th Baronet. His paternal grandparents were Henry Lowther, 3rd Earl of Lonsdale and Emily, Countess Lowther (née Emily Susan Caulfeild), the daughter of St George Caulfeild of Donamon Castle of Roscommon, Ireland.

== Career ==
He was appointed a Page of Honour on 7 April 1908 and served in that office until 25 March 1913. Educated at Royal Military College, Sandhurst, he was appointed a second lieutenant in the 10th Royal Hussars (Prince of Wales's Own) on 11 August 1915.

Lowther returned to the family estates after the war, dwelling in Clifton Hall, Westmorland. Like many of his family, he was influential in local affairs, serving as High Sheriff of Westmorland in 1930, and being appointed honorary colonel of the 4th Battalion, the Border Regiment on 19 December 1931. He moved from Clifton Hall to Askham Hall in 1933. This building, bought by the Lowthers in 1815, was carefully restored and modernized under his direction.

His career as a county gentleman continued when, on 29 April 1937, he was appointed a Deputy Lieutenant for Cumberland by his uncle, Hugh, and he himself became Lord Lieutenant of Westmorland two years later.

== Personal life ==
On 1 February 1922, Lowther married Muriel Frances Farrar, daughter of Sir George Herbert Farrar, 1st baronet, of Chicheley Hall Bucks, by whom he had three children:

- James Lowther, 7th Earl of Lonsdale (1922–2006), who married four times.
- Hon. Anthony George Lowther (b. 1925), who married Lavinia Joyce of San Francisco (parents of Camilla Lowther, maternal grandparents of models Adwoa Aboah and Kesewa Aboah). Lavinia Joyce was the only child of Lt.-Col. Thomas H. Joyce, an officer in the United States Air Force.
- Hon. Ann Mary Lowther (1927–1956), who married Colonel Julian Fane M.C. (1921–2013).

Upon the death of his uncle in 1944, Anthony assumed the style of Viscount Lowther as heir apparent to the Earldom. However, he predeceased his father in 1949, at the age of 53. His widow died on 25 February 1968.

Court offices
Preceded by Donald Davidson	Page of Honour; 1908–1913	Succeeded by Thomas Brand
Honorary titles
Preceded by Stanley Hughes le Fleming	Lord Lieutenant of Westmorland; 1939–1945	Succeeded by James Winstanley Cropper
