= Look Model Agency =

Modeling agency

Look Model Agency is a modelling agency based in San Francisco, founded in 1986 by Marie-Christine and George Kollock, it has been at the forefront of the modelling world on the West Coast since inception. In 2015, Cyril Kollock took over direction as CEO.

== Celebrities represented by Look (past and present) ==
- Rebecca Romijn
- Marjorie Conrad
- Tatjana Patitz
- Anna Nicole Smith
- Claudia Schiffer
- Jessica Alba
- Michonne Bourriague
- Amy Smart
- Mary Nnenna
- Jon Jonsson
- Alex Consani

== See also ==
- List of modeling agencies
