= Bette Franke =

Dutch model

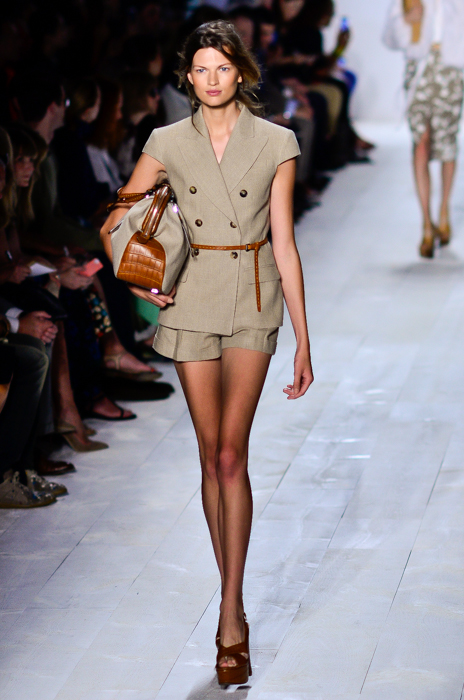
- Franke at the Michael Kors Spring/Summer 2014 fashion show on 11 September 2013 at New York Fashion Week. Photo by Christopher Macsurak.
- Born: 3 December 1989 (age 36); Heemskerk, North Holland, Netherlands
- Modeling information
- Height: 1.80 m (5 ft 11 in)
- Hair color: Brown
- Eye color: Blue
- Agency: DNA Model Management (New York); VIVA Model Management (Paris, London, Barcelona); Why Not Model Management (Milan)

Bette Franke (born 3 December 1989 in Heemskerk, North Holland) is a Dutch model. At fourteen years old, she was discovered by Dutch modeling agent Wilma Wakker in Amsterdam, while shopping with her mother.

She debuted during the Spring 2006 season in Milan as a Jil Sander exclusive, later going on to book Hermès, Emanuel Ungaro and Dries van Noten in Paris. Franke has been featured in runway shows for Balenciaga, Calvin Klein, Chanel, Chloé, and Prada, among many other high-profile designers. Franke has been featured in print advertisements for Dolce & Gabbana, Oscar de la Renta, Celine, Yves Saint Laurent and Stella McCartney.

She has been featured on the cover of Dutch "Avantgarde" in February 2007, alongside fellow Dutch models Kim Noorda and Sophie Vlaming. Bette was on the cover of Japanese "Numéro" in November 2007 and the Cover of ELLE France July 2021.

Franke is signed with DNA Model Management in New York, VIVA Model Management in Paris and Why Not model management in Milan. Her mother agent is Wilma Wakker, in Amsterdam.

She is married to Ilja Cornelisz; a researcher in economics and education who is based in Amsterdam.
