= VIVA Model Management =

French modeling agency

- Company type: Model agency
- Industry: Fashion
- Founded: 1988; 38 years ago Paris, France
- Founder: Cyril Brulé
- Headquarters: VIVA Paris: Beaupassage 53-57 rue de Grenelle, 75007 Paris; VIVA London: 23 Charlotte Road, 3rd Floor, London EC2A 3PB; VIVA Barcelona: Carrer de Llull, 57-61, 6º 4ª, 08005 Barcelona
- Website: Official website

VIVA Model Management is a model agency based in Paris, London and Barcelona. The agency was founded in Paris in 1988 by director Cyril Brulé and focuses on high-fashion editorial and catwalk work. VIVA's board features notable models, including Natalia Vodianova, Doutzen Kroes, Kirsty Hume, Raquel Zimmermann, Stella Tennant and Kaia Gerber.

As well as the shared women's division, both offices operate a "VIVA Talent" board. Talents include French icons Ines de la Fressange, Isabelle Huppert and Laetitia Casta, and British actress Charlotte Rampling.

== Models ==
Current models include:

- Kesewa Aboah
- Mica Argañaraz
- Nora Attal
- Vanessa Axente
- Małgosia Bela
- Julia Bergshoeff
- Sara Blomqvist
- Edie Campbell
- Olympia Campbell
- Laetitia Casta
- Saskia de Brauw
- Demy de Vries
- Andreea Diaconu
- Dilone
- Bette Franke
- Kaia Gerber
- Imaan Hammam
- Kirsty Hume
- Constance Jablonski
- Adrienne Jüliger
- Liya Kebede
- Doutzen Kroes
- Fernanda Ly
- Giulia Maenza
- Chaikra Shanti Maximus
- Pooja Mor
- Kati Nescher
- Julia Nobis
- Emily Ratajkowski
- Aymeline Valade
- Rianne Van Rompaey
- Signe Veiteberg
- Edita Vilkeviciute
- Natalia Vodianova
- Kiki Willems

== See also ==
- List of modeling agencies
