= Francina Díaz Mestre =

Fashion model

Francina Díaz Mestre is a catwalk and photographic model, established in Barcelona, who worked in Spain and abroad in the 1960s and 70s. In 1982 she opened Spain's first modelling school ever and became a successful businesswoman with her school and agency.

== Her early years as a model ==
Francina was born in Albi, southern France, and at nine months old moved to Barcelona, which she has come to adopt as her birthplace. A remark when she was 16 by a customer of her mother, a seamstress by trade, made her realize that she could take advantage of her body to work in the world of fashion. She embarked on the adventure of entering the world of haute couture. She began working as a model for the designer Pedro Rodríguez. For 2 years he gave her the grounding for her future career as a model. At the age of 18, she entered the Santa Eulàlia fashion house in Barcelona. She worked there for four years and began her career as a model for prestigious fashion designers in Spain. When she was 20, she moved to Paris where she modelled for Lanvin for one year and became Spain's first internationally recognized model. Over the following two years she pursued her international career by working with the greatest designers of the time. She was selected by the Chamber of Fashion (which upheld the interests of Spain's fashion industry and designers) as its representative in countries such as Japan, Belgium and France. She subsequently went to Geneva before returning to Spain to become the country's first freelance model. This allowed her to take on a wide range of work and to enter into the world of advertising.

== Her career as a promotional model ==
Marçal Moliner discovered her and paved the way for her as a promotional model. Francina's face became familiar in every household in Spain through her work in advertising campaigns, TV commercials and the most prestigious fashion magazines. During this period, she worked with the greatest names in advertising such as Leopoldo Pomés, Estudios Moro, Tessi, Xavier Miserachs, Gianni Ruggiero and Toni Bernad. She took part in the Risk campaign for Andrés Sardá and appeared in TV commercials, notably La Lechera, Gallina Blanca, Camisas IKE, Tergal, Henkel Ibérica, Playtex and Loewe. In 1976, she put an end to her career as a model and moved to Italy, where she lived in Florence and Milan.

== Francina behind the scenes ==
On her return to Barcelona in 1982, Francina decided to pass on the skills she had learnt from her professional experiences on the catwalk to future Spanish models. She thus set up the Francina New Modeling School, where she undertook the difficult task of training models, and in 1983 she created the Francina International Modeling Agency. Success stories include models such as Judit Mascó, Mar Saura, Marta Español, Tammy, Estel, Monica Van Campen and Carla Collado.

Her newly created agency began securing work for female models, and later male models, who were trained at her school. In addition to representing models, between 1984 and 1987 she also explored other activities such as choreography and the organization of fashion shows. After that, Francina concentrated her activities on representing Spanish and international top models. Amongst those are Fernanda Tavares, Tiiu Kuik, Jeísa Chiminazzo, Petra Kvapilova, María Reyes, Vanessa de Assis, Cintia Dicker, Cristina Guillén, Nicole Jonnel, Mike Nock, Jason and Laszlo. In 1998, Francina decided to set up Options by Francina Models Agency, a new venture specialized in up-and-coming young talents, filling a gap in a market always hungry for new faces.

The school was closed in 2004 and Francina currently manages and represents models at her two agencies, Francina and Options.

== Recognition of her achievements ==
In recognition of her lifelong dedication to fashion, at the 2006 edition of the AME (Association of Modelling Agencies of Spain) prize-giving ceremony, Francina was awarded a "Premio Abanico" prize for Spain's Best Model in the 1970s. She is also regularly invited to sit on juries at international modelling events. Given her experience she travels around the world to represent Spain in places such as China, USA, France, Italy, Canada, Mexico, Peru, Israel, South Africa and Belgium.

== See also ==
Francina International Modeling Agency
