= Sara Blomqvist =

Swedish fashion model and businesswoman

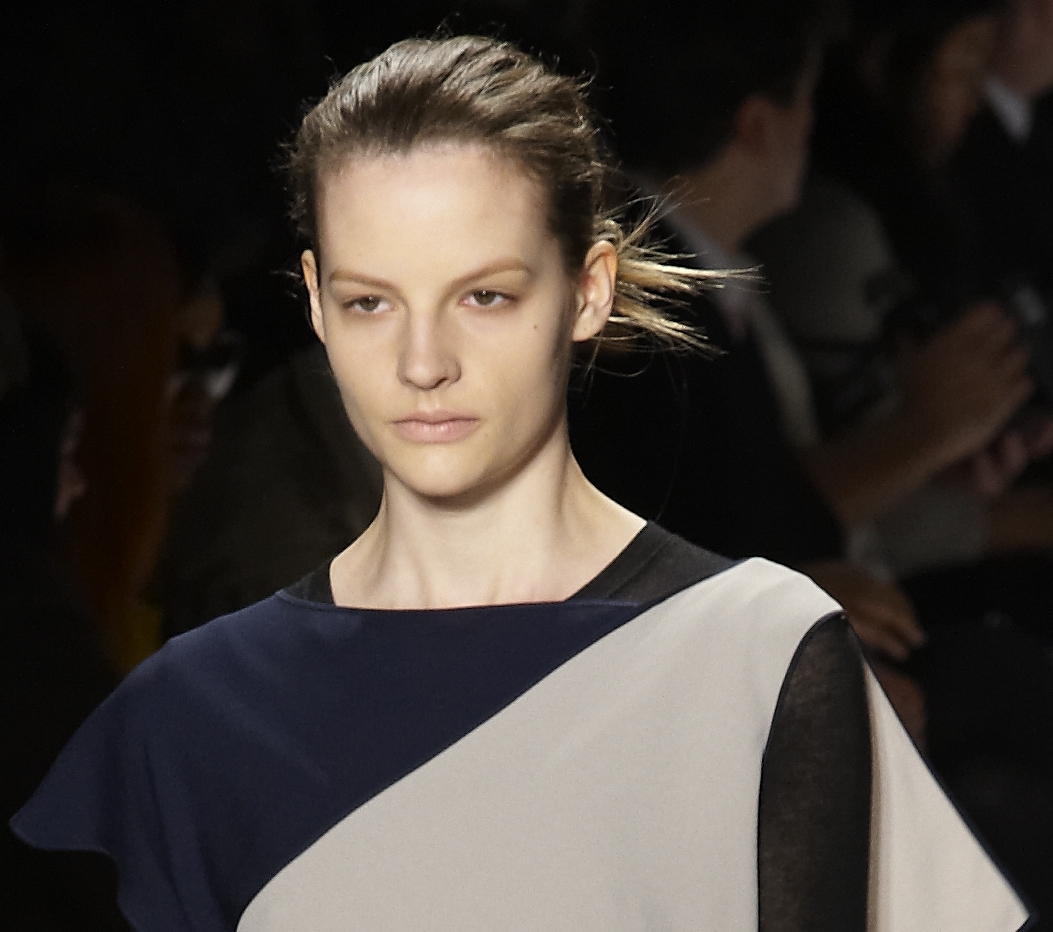
- Blomqvist walks for BCBG Max Azria in 2010
- Born: 9 April 1989 (age 36); Karlstad, Sweden
- Occupation: Model
- Years active: 2007-present
- Spouse: Jeremy Young (m. 2014)
- Children: 2
- Modelling information
- Height: 1.78 m (5 ft 10 in)
- Hair colour: Brown
- Eye colour: Brown
- Agency: DNA Models (New York); VIVA Model Management (Paris, London, Barcelona); Why Not Model Management (Milan); Scoop Models (Copenhagen); Priscilla's Model Management (Sydney); MIKAs (Stockholm) (mother agency)

Sara Blomqvist Young (born 9 April 1989) is a Swedish fashion model and businesswoman.

== Early life ==
She grew up in the remote countryside of Sweden, in an artists' compound, as the youngest of five children. Her parents were bohemian artists who were part of a Swedish "Green Wave," people who had left major cities for the country in the 1980's. As part of their bohemian attitudes, if they had a choice between buying a new television or backpacking through Asia, they would choose the latter. However, as a young person, Blomqvist herself had a drive to make a lot of money and thought she might become a surgeon or lawyer.

== Career ==
Blomqvist was scouted by Stockholm agency MIKAs at age 13, and began modeling at 15. She debuted as a Prada exclusive, (Note: An exclusive is chosen by the casting director, or sometimes Miuccia Prada herself, to only work for the brand for a season.) alongside models like Ali Stephens, in 2007.

Without doing New York Fashion Week, she went to London and Paris to model for Louis Vuitton, Chanel, Dries Van Noten, and Alexander McQueen.

Blomqvist has appeared in advertisements for Jil Sander, BCBG Max Azria, Uniqlo, Vera Wang, Tory Burch, Belstaff, Banana Republic, Givenchy, Joe Fresh, Akris, Carven, Valentino, and Missoni. Her appearances on magazine covers include Elle Sweden and Numéro China, with editorials in Vogue Italia, Vogue Polska, Marie Claire, WSJ, Vogue Deutschland, Vogue Russia, Vogue España, i-D, British Harper's Bazaar, Jalouse, and Interview among others. In 2020, for Vogue Italia's September issue, she appeared on the 68th of 100 covers.

In 2019, Blomqvist returned to Prada after a seven-year hiatus from the brand to close its spring 2020 fashion show and appears in the 2020 cruise campaign. At models.com's 2019 Model of the Year Awards, Blomqvist received the industry's vote for "Comeback of the Year". In 2022, she walked in Prada's F/W 2022 fashion show honoring many models they have used in the past two decades. They also describe her as an "Industry Icon".

In acting, she appeared in the Swedish film Sommarstället : The Summer House.

== Personal life ==
In 2014, Blomqvist married British model Jeremy Young, wearing Valentino, in Cold Spring, New York. They have a son (b. 2016), and had previously lived in Portugal and New York. She and her husband maintain part ownership in the restaurant Scarr's Pizza.

She and her family now reside in London. In 2023 Blomqvist gave birth to their second child.

She has been something of a crafter, creating handknit pieces and intentional children's clothing. She learned the skills of creating things herself from her parents (her father was a woodworker), and from growing up in a workshop.
