= Xevi Muntané =

Catalan photographer

- Born: Xavier Muntané Costas; 1977 (age 48–49); Sant Joan de Vilatorrada, Catalonia, Spain
- Education: Institut d'Estudis Fotogràfics de Catalunya; International Center of Photography
- Occupation: Photographer

Xavier "Xevi" Muntané Costas (born 1977 in Sant Joan de Vilatorrada) is a Catalan photographer, based between New York and Barcelona, known for his fashion and portrait work. He trained at the Institut d'Estudis Fotogràfics de Catalunya (IEFC) and the International Center of Photography, and began his career as an assistant to David LaChapelle, before publishing in magazines such as i-D and V. In the early 2000s he began a long collaboration with the singer Kylie Minogue, photographing her for books, record artwork and exhibition catalogues, and his portraits also include Tilda Swinton, Pedro Almodóvar and Marina Abramović. His work is part of the permanent collection of the Museu del Disseny de Barcelona.

== Style ==
In the catalogue for the exhibition Distinció. Un segle de fotografia de moda, curator Juan Naranjo wrote that Muntané's photographs show "the different concepts and contradictions that have been used to spread fashion in relation to class, sex, elegance, vulgarity", and that they "present different ways of perceiving the body, linked to religion and the morality of the era, in which the body is shown or covered." In the Museu del Disseny de Barcelona's online catalogue entry on Muntané, curator Esperança Codina identifies two modes in his photography: a series of images built around movement, using backlit glare, multicoloured lighting and flash applied over the subject, and a sparser mode of minimalist pictures based on tightly controlled geometry. Journalist Bibiana Ballbè described his style as "childlike, direct, simple and graphic". Muntané told El País that he prefers to think of himself as a photographer of popular culture rather than a fashion photographer, and described fashion as:

a necessary fantasy, like football, like a Barça-Madrid match, a form of escapism.

— El País, 2011

== Early career ==
After studying at the International Center of Photography, Muntané worked as an assistant to David LaChapelle in New York. His work started being published in V Magazine by 2000, when a photograph of Sophie Dahl wearing a corset by the artist Nicola Costantino that first appeared there, was later used on the poster for Costantino's exhibition Human Furriery at Deitch Projects in New York.

In July 2004, i-D published a photograph by Muntané taken in April of that year in Central Park, New York, in which he made use of an installation by the Brazilian artist AVAF, part of the Whitney Biennial. A further i-D editorial, "Don't Look Back to the Last Century", photographed by Muntané for the October 2004 issue, was directed by Judy Blame and styled by William Baker, with Princess Julia and Gareth Pugh among those featured.

In 2005, Butt magazine published a profile of Muntané by the writer Michael Bullock, later reprinted in Butt Book (Taschen, 2006), in which Bullock described his work:

To me Xevi's work looked like the result of a collaboration between David LaChapelle and Robert Mapplethorpe, pop baroque styling with isolated sculptural looking figures.

— Michael Bullock, Butt, 2005

That same year, his work was included in V Best: Five Years of V Magazine, an anthology of the magazine's first five years.

== Kylie Minogue ==
In the early 2000s Muntané began working with Kylie Minogue. He photographed the programme for her 2001 On a Night Like This Tour (March–May 2001), and his photographs also appeared in Kylie: La La La (Hodder & Stoughton, 2002), a book by Minogue and William Baker. He shot the cover artwork of her single "I Believe in You" (November 2004), the lead single from her compilation Ultimate Kylie, and later photographed her for the cover of Kylie (2007), the catalogue of the exhibition Kylie: The Exhibition, in which further photographs by him appeared.

In 2012 El País Semanal asked Muntané to contribute a first-person piece, "Aprender con 'Min'" ("Learning with 'Min'"), to its report on Kylie Minogue, published on 14 October 2012. In it he recalled his early work with her:

I met her in Los Angeles, in 2000, during the shoot of the video Your disco needs you. William Baker, her creative director and best friend, introduced us. The first impression Kylie (Min, to her friends) made on me was that of a ballet teacher. I was surprised by how willing she was to work with me. I was a 22-year-old kid at the time. […] I would dare say that I learned to take photographs with Kylie.

— El País Semanal, 2012

That same year, Thames & Hudson published Kylie / Fashion, a book on Minogue's fashion history by Minogue and William Baker, which included photographs by Muntané.

== Work in Spain ==
By 2007 Muntané's work was divided between New York and Spain. The Catalan newspaper Regió7 featured him in an interview that March, presenting him as a Catalan photographer working between Barcelona and New York. In March 2006 he had photographed "Electric City", an editorial for i-D that featured Spanish figures including Rossy de Palma, Bimba Bosé, the designer David Delfín and Andrés Velencoso, and Victoria Beckham for the Spanish magazine Vanidad, an editorial that La Vanguardia previewed before its publication, noting that she showed a wide range of registers in front of his camera.

In December 2007, the Televisió de Catalunya programme Silenci? featured him, in episode 10 of season 7. The programme presented him as a photographer drawn to popular and mass culture. It also reported that his first photograph published in i-D was a portrait of Hedi Slimane taken in an elevator.

In 2009, he designed the poster for the 38th edition of the Feria de Abril de Catalunya. Writer Quim Monzó reviewed it in La Vanguardia:

The play of primary colours, the distance from reality: the hands that multiply, the yellow, red and blue skin of the dancer […] It is, simply, a poster that makes you look, an excellent poster that is not subordinated to any moth-eaten aesthetic.

— Quim Monzó, La Vanguardia, 2009

Muntané photographed the director Pedro Almodóvar and members of the cast of The Skin I Live In, including Antonio Banderas, Elena Anaya, Jan Cornet, Blanca Suárez and Bárbara Lennie, for the tenth issue of V Spain, published in 2011. The feature, "La piel que habito", was written by Javier Giner.

ABC named Muntané among the Spanish figures photographed by the artist Bruce LaBruce for Obscenity, an exhibition at the Fresh Gallery in Madrid that opened on 16 February 2012. The series, which also included Rossy de Palma and Alaska, showed its subjects dressed as angels, nuns and priests.

In April of that year Muntané took portraits of the artist Marina Abramović for a profile in the summer issue of Bullett, published on the occasion of Robert Wilson's production The Life and Death of Marina Abramović at the Teatro Real in Madrid. The shoot included ravens, an eagle and a baby tiger, whose meaning Abramović explained in the article:

The raven is a symbol of bad news and death, the small tiger is an image of strength, and the eagle is an image of power. Each of these elements represents the Fall of Man, but everything that is negative has a positive side. Everything that is black is also white. I am so many things at the same time.

— Marina Abramović, Bullett, 2012

That summer Muntané also photographed the actress Tilda Swinton for the cover of Candy Transversal no. 4, a magazine edited by Luis Venegas that focuses on transvestism, transsexuality, cross-dressing and androgyny, with a 28-page portfolio of her, "The Transformer", with creative direction and styling by Jerry Stafford. The cover was reported in the international press because of how unrecognisable Swinton appeared in a gender-bending transformation. HuffPost observed:

Although you wouldn't know it at first glance, Tilda Swinton is Candy's latest cover star. The typical barefaced actress appears wearing [heavy makeup], a wig of thick wavy red locks and an over-the-top gold dress — in other words, exactly the sort of thing Tilda never wears.

— HuffPost, 2012

== Exhibitions and collection ==
Muntané took part in Kylie: The Exhibition, a retrospective on the career and image of Kylie Minogue, at the Victoria and Albert Museum in London (8 February – 10 June 2007). The exhibition had previously been shown at Arts Centre Melbourne (15 January – 25 April 2005).

In January 2011, Muntané was one of 50 photographers whose large-format fashion photographs were shown on the Passeig de Gràcia in Barcelona, in the exhibition Shoot'n the city, alongside Antoni Bernad, Sergi Pons and Manuel Outumuro.

Photographs by Muntané were included in Silvia Prada's exhibition The New Modern Hair at the Pacific Design Center in Los Angeles (18 January – 26 February 2013).

He was also part of the group exhibition A cop d'ull. Cultura visual fotogràfica recent a Barcelona (At a Glance. Recent Photographic Visual Culture in Barcelona) at La Virreina Centre de la Imatge in Barcelona (5 December 2013 – 16 March 2014), curated by Àlex Brahim and Manuel Segade.

That same year, Muntané donated seventeen photographs to the Museu del Disseny de Barcelona (Barcelona Design Museum), including the series Back to Black, Cadena de montaje, Daily Fix, Lost little girl and La prisonnière.

Muntané took part in the exhibition Jean Paul Gaultier at the Grand Palais in Paris (30 March – 3 August 2015). His photograph Tony, Mode d'emploi (2012), a portrait of the model Tony Ward, was later shown in The Fashion World of Jean Paul Gaultier: From the Sidewalk to the Catwalk at the Kunsthalle der Hypo-Kulturstiftung in Munich (18 September 2015 – 14 February 2016). This exhibition, organised by the Montreal Museum of Fine Arts, had previously been shown at the Barbican Art Gallery in London (9 April – 25 August 2014).

Part of the photographs Muntané had donated to the Museu del Disseny was featured in Distinció. Un segle de fotografia de moda (Distinction. A Century of Fashion Photography), held at the museum from 26 November 2015 to 30 April 2016 after an extension and curated by Juan Naranjo. It was the first public presentation of the museum's fashion photography collection and was shown again at the Cristóbal Balenciaga Museum in Getaria from 9 October 2018 to 27 January 2019.

== Books and catalogues ==
In 2013, Muntané's work was included in the catalogue Punk: Chaos to Couture, from the exhibition of the same name held at the Metropolitan Museum of Art (the Met) from 9 May to 14 August 2013. Between 2015 and 2020, his photographs were included in three further books: Jean Paul Gaultier: From the Sidewalk to the Catwalk (Knesebeck, 2015), the German-language catalogue, edited by Thierry-Maxime Loriot, of the exhibition on the fashion designer Jean Paul Gaultier at the Kunsthalle der Hypo-Kulturstiftung in Munich; Kate Spade New York: SHE (Abrams, 2017), which includes his photograph of Tilda Swinton; and The Candy Book of Transversal Creativity (Rizzoli, 2020), a collection of material from C*NDY magazine.
