= Matilda Lowther =

British fashion model

- Born: Matilda Grace Lowther; 10 July 1995 (age 31); Carlisle, England
- Other name: Tilly Lowther
- Occupation: Fashion model
- Relatives: James Lowther, 7th Earl of Lonsdale (grandfather); Adwoa Aboah (second cousin); Kesewa Aboah (second cousin)
- Modelling information
- Height: 1.80 m (5 ft 11 in)
- Hair colour: Brown
- Eye colour: Blue
- Agency: HEROES Model Management (New York); Marilyn Agency (Paris); Special Management (Milan); Chapter Management (London)

Matilda Grace Lowther (born 10 July 1995) is a British fashion model.

== Early life ==
Lowther is the eldest of four children of Eton-educated Hon. James Nicholas Lowther and Vanessa, daughter of Alan Catchpole, of Broke Hall, Nacton, Suffolk. Her paternal grandfather was James Lowther, 7th Earl of Lonsdale. Her grandmother, Nancy Ruth Cobbs, Countess of Lonsdale, was from Pacific Palisades, California. She graduated from Queen Margaret's School, York.

== Career ==
In her debut season, Lowther opened Burberry's S/S and F/W 2014 fashion shows. She has walked for brands including Miu Miu, Comme des Garçons, The Row, Rodarte, Hermès, and Bottega Veneta. Lowther co-starred with models such as Jourdan Dunn and Lily Donaldson in a Balmain campaign.

Her first cover was for British Vogue’s Miss Vogue (the equivalent of Teen Vogue). She has also been on the cover of Vogue Portugal, Telegraph's magazine, and appeared in editorials for British GQ, British Vogue, Vogue Germany, Vogue Japan, Vogue China, Vogue Paris, Vogue Mexico, Interview, Dazed, Elle, WSJ, i-D, W, L'Officiel, and Love.
