= Camilla Lowther =

British talent agent

Camilla Lowther OBE
- Occupations: booking agent, businesswoman
- Spouse: Charles Aboah
- Children: Adwoa Aboah; Kesewa Aboah
- Relatives: Lowther family

Camilla Ann Lowther OBE is a British fashion booking agent and the founder of Camilla Lowther Management.

== Early life and family ==
Lowther is the daughter of Captain Anthony George Lowther and Lavinia Joyce. Her father, the second son of Anthony Lowther, Viscount Lowther, served as Sheriff of Westmorland, Master of the Ullswater Foxhounds, and Chairman of the Cumbria Constabulary. Her mother, who was from San Francisco and Pasadena, California, was the daughter of Lt.-Col. Thomas H. Joyce, officer in the United States Air Force. Lowther is a paternal great-granddaughter of Lancelot Lowther, 6th Earl of Lonsdale and of Sir George Farrar, 1st Baronet. She was the niece of James Lowther, 7th Earl of Lonsdale and is a first cousin of Hugh Lowther, 8th Earl of Lonsdale. Lowther grew up at Whitbysteads Farm in Askham, Cumbria, near Lowther Castle.

== Career ==
Lowther started her career in fashion as a model, doing an advertisement campaign for Gap in the 1980s. She later founded the talent agency Camilla Lowther Management, also called CLM, in London in 1984. The agency manages photographers, stylists, designers, make-up artists, and fashion models. Lowther has represented Juergen Teller, Shonna Heath, Corinne Day, Josh Olins, and Tim Walker. In 1996 she launched CLMUS in New York. Lowther sold CLM and CLMUS to The Great Bowery in 2014. She was voted one of 100 Most Connected Women by British GQ.

== Personal life ==
Lowther lives in Westbourne, London. She is married to Charles Aboah, a talent scout from Ghana. She is the mother of models Adwoa Aboah and Kesewa Aboah.

Lowther was made an Officer of the Order of the British Empire (OBE) in the 2020 New Year Honours for her services to British fashion and photography.
