= Chaikra Shanti Maximus =

Belgian fashion model

- Born: Ghent, Belgium
- Other names: Chai Maximus
- Modeling information
- Height: 1.80 m (5 ft 11 in)
- Hair color: Brown
- Eye color: Brown
- Agency: DNA Model Management (New York); VIVA Model Management (Paris, London, Barcelona); The Fabbrica (Milan); Noah mgmt (Brussels) (mother agency)

Chaikra Shanti "Chai" Maximus is a Belgian fashion model. She is known for her "edgy" look while working in high fashion.

== Career ==
Maximus was discovered in Ghent, Belgium. During the first years of her career she was unbookable due to having multiple facial piercings which she refused to remove, although after fashion houses Loewe, Sacai, and Alexander McQueen cast her, others followed suit. The Dries van Noten S/S 2020 show decorated its models' faces in gold ornaments inspired by her facial piercings. Maximus has appeared in campaigns for Burberry and Dior, and walked the runway for Dior, Burberry, Chanel, Valentino, Kenzo, Roberto Cavalli, Oscar de la Renta, Hermès, Michael Kors, Versace, Salvatore Ferragamo, Gabriela Hearst, and Maison Margiela. She has appeared in Vogue Italia, CR Fashion Book, and Harper's Bazaar.

In 2019, Vogue chose her as one of their "Top 14" models of 2019, and models.com chose her as one of their "Top Newcomers".
