= List of L'Officiel España cover models =

This list of L'Officiel España cover models (1992–1992; 2015–2018; 2021–2021) is a catalog of cover models who have appeared on the cover of L'Officiel España, the Spanish edition of French fashion magazine L'Officiel.

== 1990s ==
=== 1992 ===
Issue	Cover model	Photographer	Ref.
Spring/Summer	Frederikke Magnussen	Sergio Caminata	
Autumn/Winter	Linda Evangelista	Jonathan Lennard	

== 2010s ==
=== 2015 ===
Issue	Cover model	Photographer	Ref.
September	Kate Moss		
October	Victoria Beckham		
November	Amanda Lear		
December	Anjelica Huston		

=== 2016 ===
Issue	Cover model	Photographer	Ref.
January/February	Grace Coddington		
March	Sophia Linnewedel	Laura Marie Cieplik	
April	Vivienne Westwood	Inez and Vinoodh	
May	Chus Lampreave		
June	Sofia Tesmenitskaya	Alfonso Ohnur	
July/August	Marilyn Monroe		
September	Saadi Schimmel	Masha Mel	
October	Serge Gainsbourg, Jane Birkin		
October	John Lennon, Yoko Ono		
October	Sharon Tate, Roman Polanski		
November	Kitty Hayes	Laura Marie Cieplik	
December/January 2017	Grace Jones		

=== 2017 ===
Issue	Cover model	Photographer	Ref.
March	Georgia Howorth	Sophie Mayanne	
April	Kim Peers	Laura Marie Cieplik	
May	Annely Bouma	Alfonso Ohnur	
June	Sita Abellán	Masha Mel	
June	Ilvie Wittek	Masha Mel	
July/August (Ibiza)	Bárbara Lennie	Noel Quintela	
July/August (Ibiza)	Ellen de Weer	Erik Von Frankenberg	
September	Gala González	J. Ménendez	
September	Suzi Leenaars	Laura Marie Cieplik	
October	Lindsay Lohan	Laura Marie Cieplik	
November	Anna Cleveland	Laura Marie Cieplik	
November	Alice Dellal	Juliette Cassidy	
December/January 2018	Adèle Exarchopoulos	Juliette Cassidy	
December/January 2018	Damaris Goddrie	François Pragnère	
December/January 2018	Isabella Ridolfi		

=== 2018 ===
Issue	Cover model	Photographer	Ref.
March	Georgina Grenville	Hugo Comte	
March	Odette Pavlova	Sonia Szóstak	
March	Nina Urgell	Sonia Szóstak	
May	Cicciolina	Laura Marie Cieplik	
May	Linnea Rimberg	Laura Marie Cieplik	
July (Ibiza)	Laetita Catzeflis	Álvaro Pereña	
October	Estella Boarsma	Mehdi Sef	
October	Misha Hart	Alva Galim	
October	Rita Ora	Jacques Burga	
November	Debra Shaw	Mehdi Sef	
November	Maty N'diaye, Alice Enghdal, Serena Sy	Mehdi Sef	
December/January 2019	Teddy Quinlivan	Estévez and Belloso	

== 2020s ==
=== 2021 ===
Issue	Cover model	Photographer	Ref.
August	Aaron Altaras	Celine van Heel	
August	Milena Smit	Celine van Heel	
Undated (October)	Najwa Nimri	Celine van Heel	
Undated (November)	Ana Rujas	Geray Mena	

== See also ==
- List of Vogue España cover models
- List of Harper's Bazaar España cover models
