= Demy de Vries =

Dutch fashion model

- Born: 23 December 1999 (age 26); Egmond aan den Hoef, Netherlands
- Modeling information
- Hair color: Blonde
- Eye color: Blue
- Agency: DNA Models (New York); VIVA Model Management (London, Paris, Barcelona); Why Not Model Management (Milan)

Demy de Vries is a Dutch fashion model.

== Career ==
De Vries was discovered at a Zara store. She debuted as a Prada exclusive, which is considered to be the highest feat for a model. She has modeled for Bottega Veneta, Hugo Boss, and Christopher Kane. De Vries has also walked for Dior, Valentino, and Kenzo.

In 2018, models.com chose her as a “Top Newcomer” having walked for Prada, Gucci, Hugo Boss, Erdem, Giambattista Valli, Roberto Cavalli, and Altuzarra among others in the F/W season.
