= Ugly Models =

Modeling agency

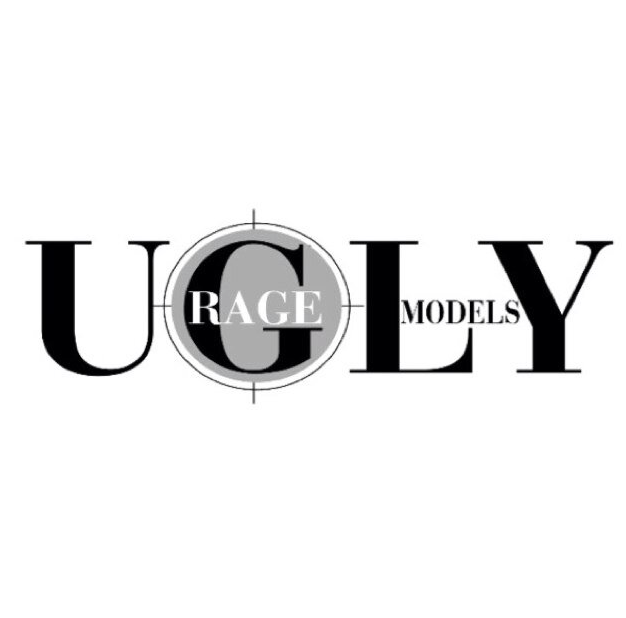
Ugly Models' logo

Ugly Models is a London-based alternative modelling agency that specialises in character modelling. Owner Marc French says it is about "celebrating everyone's unique beauty". Major clients include Calvin Klein, Levi's, Diesel, Vogue, Elle, and Cosmopolitan, with models appearing in film series such as Harry Potter, Pirates of the Caribbean and James Bond. Ugly Models are in official partnership with Guinness World Records and represents the world's tallest man, the world's most pierced woman and the world's most tattooed man.

== History ==
Ugly was started in 1969 by Jill Searle to fill a gap in the modeling market for interesting faces. They placed an advert in a newspaper saying "If you've got an interesting face contact Ugly.", people poured in, and the agency took off after they received thousands of applicants from the outset. They created a niche for themselves in supplying advertisers with faces that are not traditionally beautiful to front its campaigns. In 1997, Marc French had the idea of creating an offshoot fashion agency within the company called Rage. Both Rage and Ugly work from the same office but Rage is about conventionally beautiful and 'girl or boy next door types'. Most of the Rage models are dancers, performers or extras.

A three-part documentary series titled 'Britain's Ugliest Models' aired in 2010 on Channel 5. It was an in-depth, behind-the-scenes look at the agency which followed French and his team as they scouted for fresh talent to add to their books in the UK and the United States.

== See also ==
- List of modeling agencies
