= Cristóbal Balenciaga =

Spanish fashion designer (1895–1972)

- Balenciaga in 1950
- Born: Cristóbal Balenciaga Eizaguirre; 21 January 1895; Getaria, Spain
- Died: 24 March 1972 (aged 77); Valencia, Spain
- Resting place: Getaria Cemetery
- Occupation: Fashion designer
- Years active: 1917–1972
- Known for: Haute couture
- Label: Balenciaga
- Partner: Władzio Jaworowski d'Attainville (–1948)

Cristóbal Balenciaga Eizaguirre (Spanish: [kɾisˈtoβal βalenˈθjaɣa ejθaˈɣire]; Basque: Cristobal Balentziaga Eizagirre [kɾis̺toβal βalents̻i.aɣa eis̻aɣire]; 21 January 1895 – 24 March 1972) was a Spanish fashion designer, and the founder of the Balenciaga clothing brand. He had a reputation as a couturier of uncompromising standards and was referred to as "the master of us all" by Christian Dior and as "the only couturier in the truest sense of the word" by Coco Chanel, who continued, "The others are simply fashion designers". On the day of his death, in 1972, Women's Wear Daily ran the headline "The King is Dead".

Since 2011 the purpose-built Cristóbal Balenciaga Museum has exhibited examples of his work in his birth town Getaria. Many of the 1,200 pieces in the collection were supplied by his pupil Hubert de Givenchy and clients such as First Lady Jacqueline Kennedy.

== Early life ==
Balenciaga was born in the Basque town of Getaria (Gipuzkoa), Spain on 21 January 1895. His father, José Balenciaga Basurto, was a mariner who died when Cristóbal was a boy, and his mother, Martina Eizaguirre Embil, a seamstress. As a child Balenciaga, together with his two siblings Agustina and Juan, often spent time with his mother as she worked. At the age of twelve, he began work as the apprentice of a tailor. When he was a teenager, the Marchioness de Casa Torres, the foremost noblewoman in his town, became his customer and patron. She sent him to Madrid, where he was formally trained in tailoring.

== Career ==
Balenciaga was successful during his early career as a designer in Spain. He opened a boutique in San Sebastián in 1919, which expanded to include branches in Madrid and Barcelona. The Spanish royal family and the aristocracy wore his designs, but when the Spanish Civil War forced him to close his stores, Balenciaga moved to Paris. He opened his Paris couture house on Avenue George V in August 1937.

However, it was not until the post-war years that the full scale of the inventiveness of his highly original designs became evident. Balenciaga was particularly known for his experimental approach to garment construction, structure, and emphasizing volume. In 1951, he totally transformed the silhouette, broadening the shoulders and removing the waist. In 1955, he designed the tunic dress, which later developed into the chemise dress of 1957. In 1959, his work culminated in the Empire line, with high-waisted dresses and coats cut like kimono.

From 1956 onwards his fashion shows were always held one month after all other couture events. Hubert de Givenchy adopted this approach for Givenchy.

In 1958, the French government awarded Balenciaga the Legion of Honour in the rank of a Knight (Chevalier de la Légion d’honneur) in recognition of his services to the fashion industry.

In 1960 he made the wedding dress for Fabiola de Mora y Aragón when she married King Baudouin of Belgium. He created many designs for C.I.A. agent Aline Griffith, diplomat Margarita Salaverría Galárraga, and designer Meye Allende de Maier, considering them his muses. He taught fashion design classes, inspiring other designers including Oscar de la Renta, André Courrèges, Emanuel Ungaro, Mila Schön, and Hubert de Givenchy. His often spare, sculptural creations were considered masterworks of haute couture in the 1950s and 1960s.

His most famous clients were Mona von Bismarck, Gloria Guinness, Jackie Kennedy, Grace Kelly, Ava Gardner, and Audrey Hepburn.

== Retirement and death ==
Balenciaga retired from the high fashion world in 1968 at the age of 74 after working in Paris for thirty years. First, he decided to retire from active life in May 1968 and, a few months later, on 1 July, the newspapers broke the news of his headquarters in Paris and his studios in Madrid closing, with the exception of its perfume and accessory divisions.

The closing down of his business came by surprise even to his employees. Subsequently, 112 of his employees filed a lawsuit against Balenciagas Spanish brand Eisa. They regarded the closure as unjustified because there were still outstanding orders.

Balenciaga justified the closing with his habitual clinical brevity: "High fashion is mortally wounded". On one hand, the intense imposing burden of the French taxes blew through the largest part of the profits and, on the other, Americans stopped buying French high fashion, largely because of General de Gaulle's anti-American politics. Americans had succeeded in representing close to seventy percent of the Balenciaga clientele.

Balenciaga returned to Spain. He lived in his house in Altea (Alicante), where he enjoyed painting, conversing, and eating in the company of some of his Spanish assistants.

From July 1970 until his death in 1972, Balenciaga collaborated artistically with two Spanish prêt-à-porter companies, though without investing any financial resources. Both companies did not achieve commercial success, as Balenciaga set high quality standards that were incompatible with the production of prêt-à-porter fashion.

In 1972, he accepted the job of designing a gown for the wedding of Carmen Martínez-Bordiú, the daughter of one of his most important clients, Carmen Franco y Polo, and hence, the granddaughter of dictator Francisco Franco. Her wedding to Alfonso de Borbón y Dampierre, a grandson of the Spanish king-in-exile, Alfonso XIII, was celebrated on 8 March 1972, Martínez-Bordiu's dress being Balenciaga's last couture work.

In the spring of 1972, the Tribunal Supremo, Spain’s Supreme Court, ruled in favour of the employees in the legal dispute over the closure of the Spanish company Eisa. As a result, Balenciaga was forced to reopen Eisa.

In March 1972, Balenciaga went to spend a vacation at the Parador of Jávea (Alicante). On 22 March 1972, he suffered a heart attack, followed by heart failure. Balenciaga died at the 24 March 1972 in a hospital in Valencia, he was 77 years old. Balenciaga was buried in the Getaria Cemetery.

== Personal life ==
Balenciaga was gay, although he kept his sexuality private throughout his life. The love of his life and his long time partner was Franco-Polish millionaire Władzio Jaworowski d'Attainville, who had helped set him up and fund him. When d'Attainville died in 1948, Balenciaga was so broken he considered closing the business. His next collection after d'Attainville's death was designed entirely in black to mourn his loss.

Throughout his life, Balenciaga had shunned the public eye. He gave only two interviews, both after his fashion house had closed: in 1968 to Paris Match magazine and in 1971 to Prudence Glynn for the newspaper The Times.

== Work ==
During the 1950s, designers like Christian Dior, Pierre Balmain, and Coco Chanel emerged, creating pieces very representative to their fashion houses and to their own styles. An important protagonist for this period was Cristóbal Balenciaga. This Spanish fashion designer was known as "The King of Fashion" and "The Master of Us All" and was one of the great masterminds of the period. Balenciaga was born and raised in Spain, where he worked for the Spanish royalty, but because of the Spanish Civil War he moved to Paris where his genius was finally recognized, leading to a domination of the fashion scene.

The most eye-catching designer of this period was Balenciaga because of his structural designs, which had never before been seen in the fashion world. He was a master of construction, and created all of his work without any sketches or illustrations beforehand. This was practically unheard of in his time, and still is to this day. In the age of couture, most all couturiers were mainly proficient in illustration, lacking profound knowledge of the craft. It is said that when designing his garments, he began by feeling the fabric, and only then could he form a design around what would best suit it. Compared to his counterparts, he obtained an edge with his deep understanding and unrelenting precision. "He reshaped women's silhouette in the 1950s, so that clothes we think as typical of that decade are mostly dilutions of his work." (Irvine, 2013) Compared to some work like the New Look from Christian Dior, which featured full skirts and a tiny waist, Balenciaga worked to achieve what was seemingly the opposite. Much of Cristobal's work of the mid to later 50s showcased wildly avant garde designs which did not conform to the female body in the same ways; designs like the Sack Dress, which was developed alongside Hubert de Givenchy, the Cocoon Coat, and Babydoll Dress. He blurred the line of contemporary design by dropping waist lines and simplifying seams to achieve elegance in his designs. The one-seam Yoki coat's construction showcased this sewing approach; it featured a front and back that include the sleeves in their pattern pieces similar to the construction of a Kimono. He also invented multiple coats under his main line, Balenciaga, and the sister label, Eisa, which featured a back yoke that extended into the under sleeve, and also utilized a similar approach.

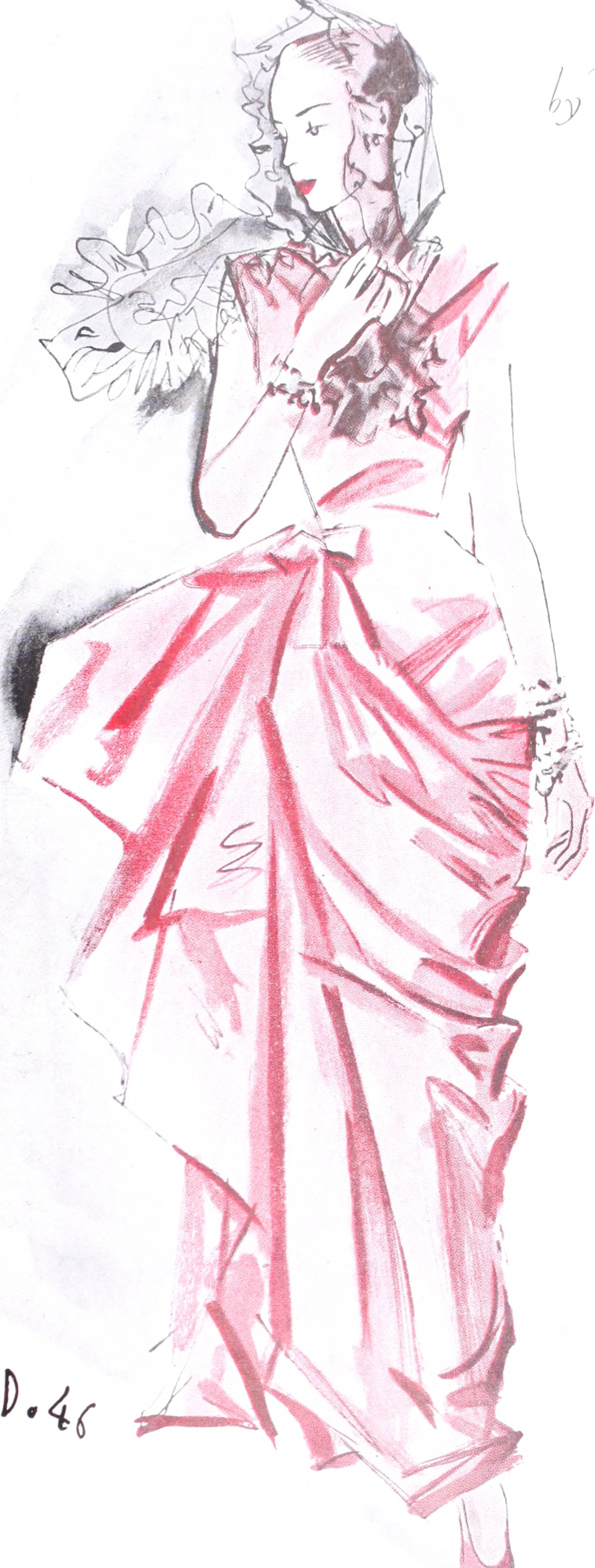
Draped pink taffeta evening dress with black lace scarf (1947). Ladies' Home Journal.

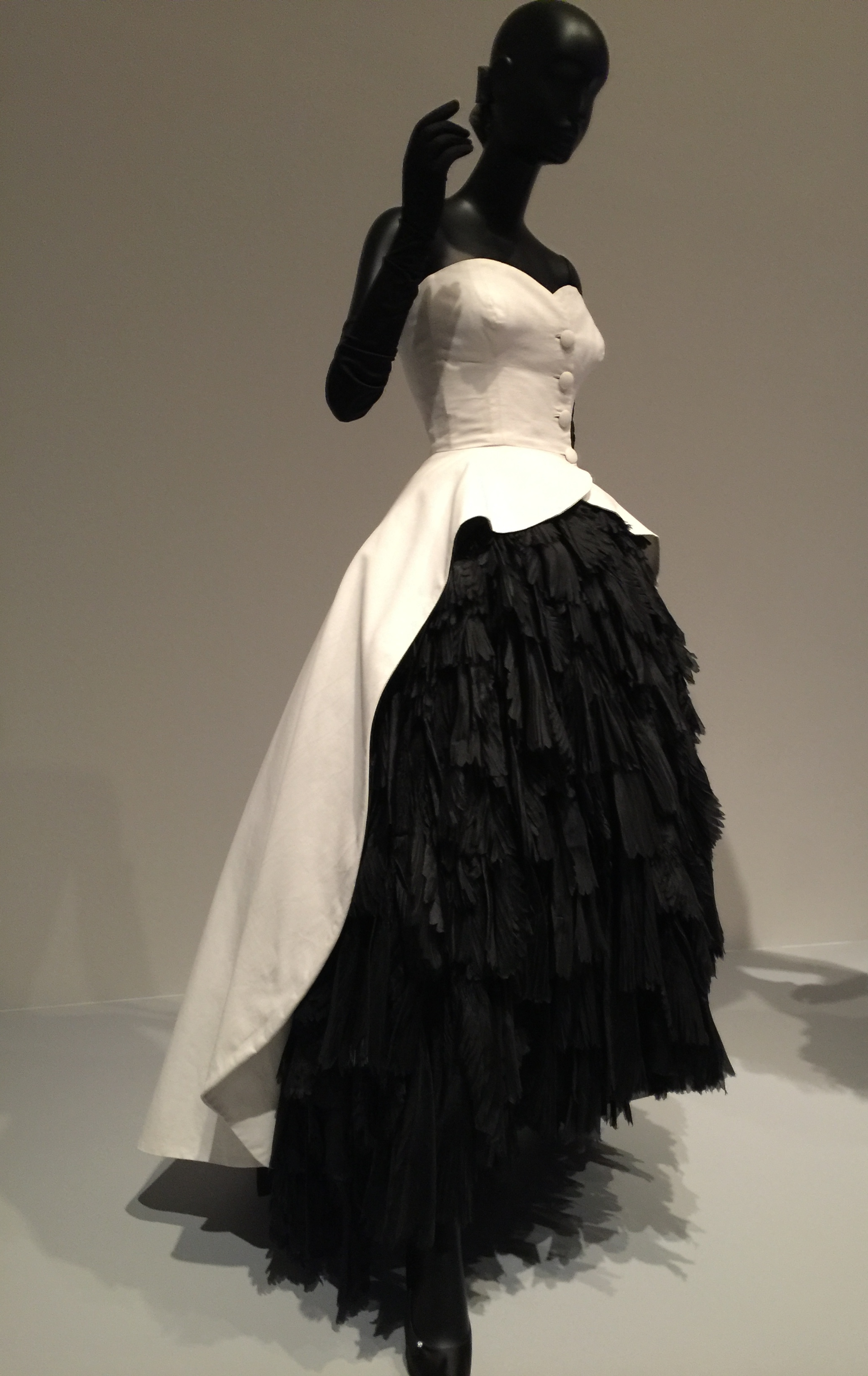
White cotton pique and black taffeta and organza evening gown (1951). Philadelphia Museum of Art.

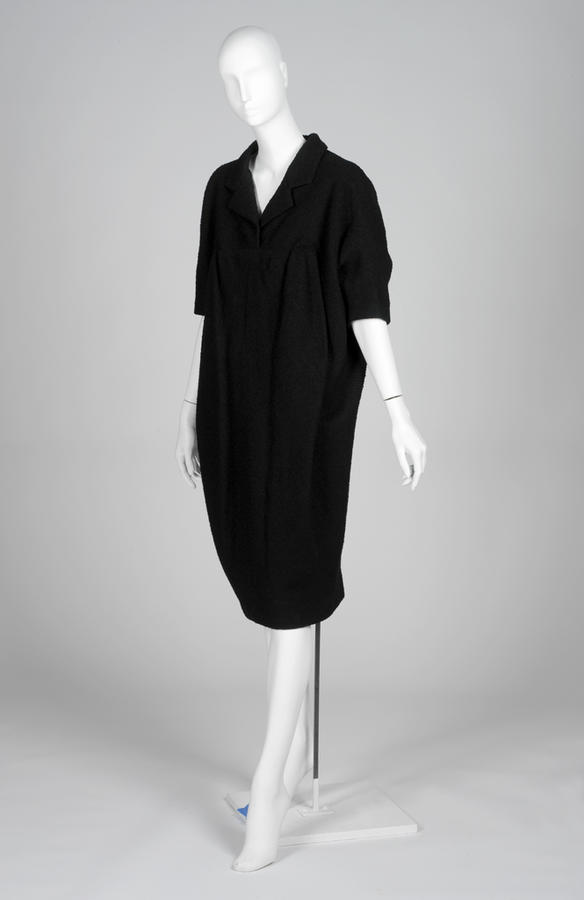
Black bouclé wool chemise or 'sack' dress (1957). Rhode Island School of Design Museum.

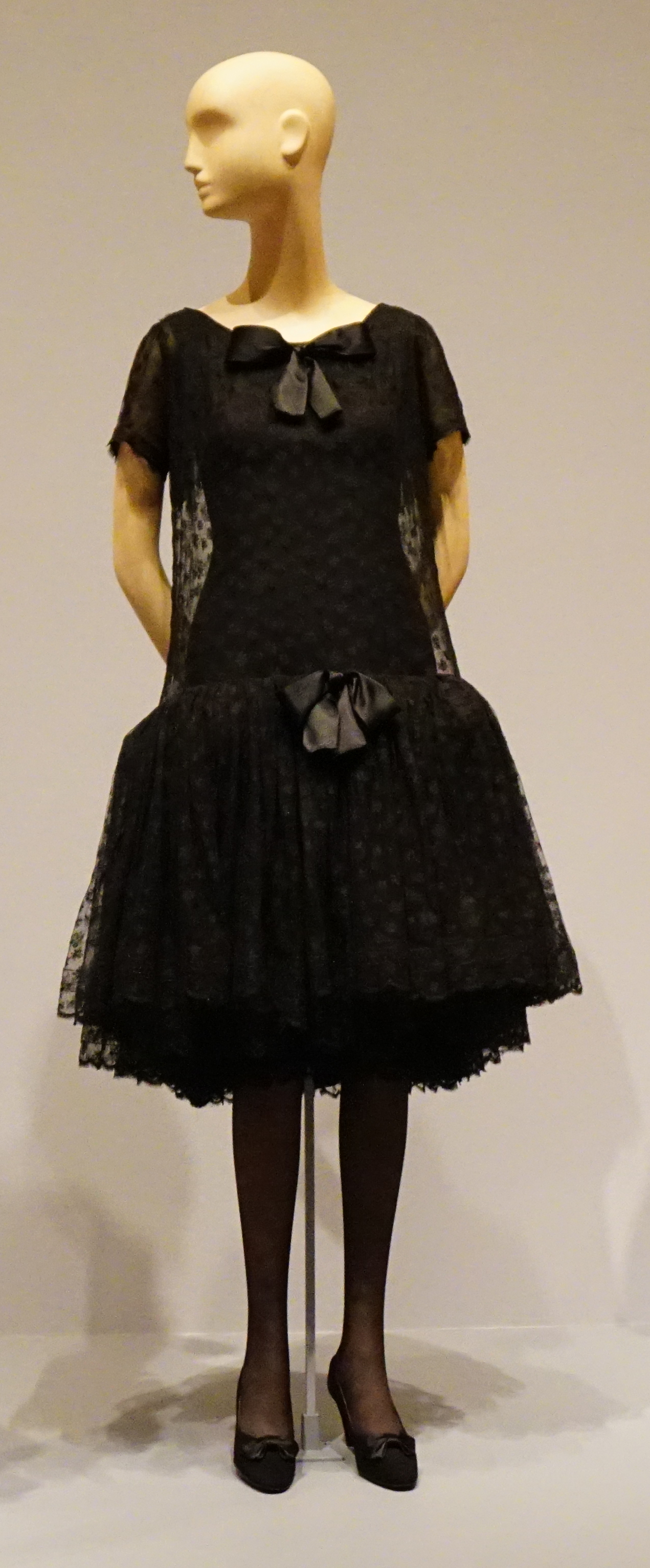
Black lace babydoll dress (1958). Philadelphia Museum of Art.

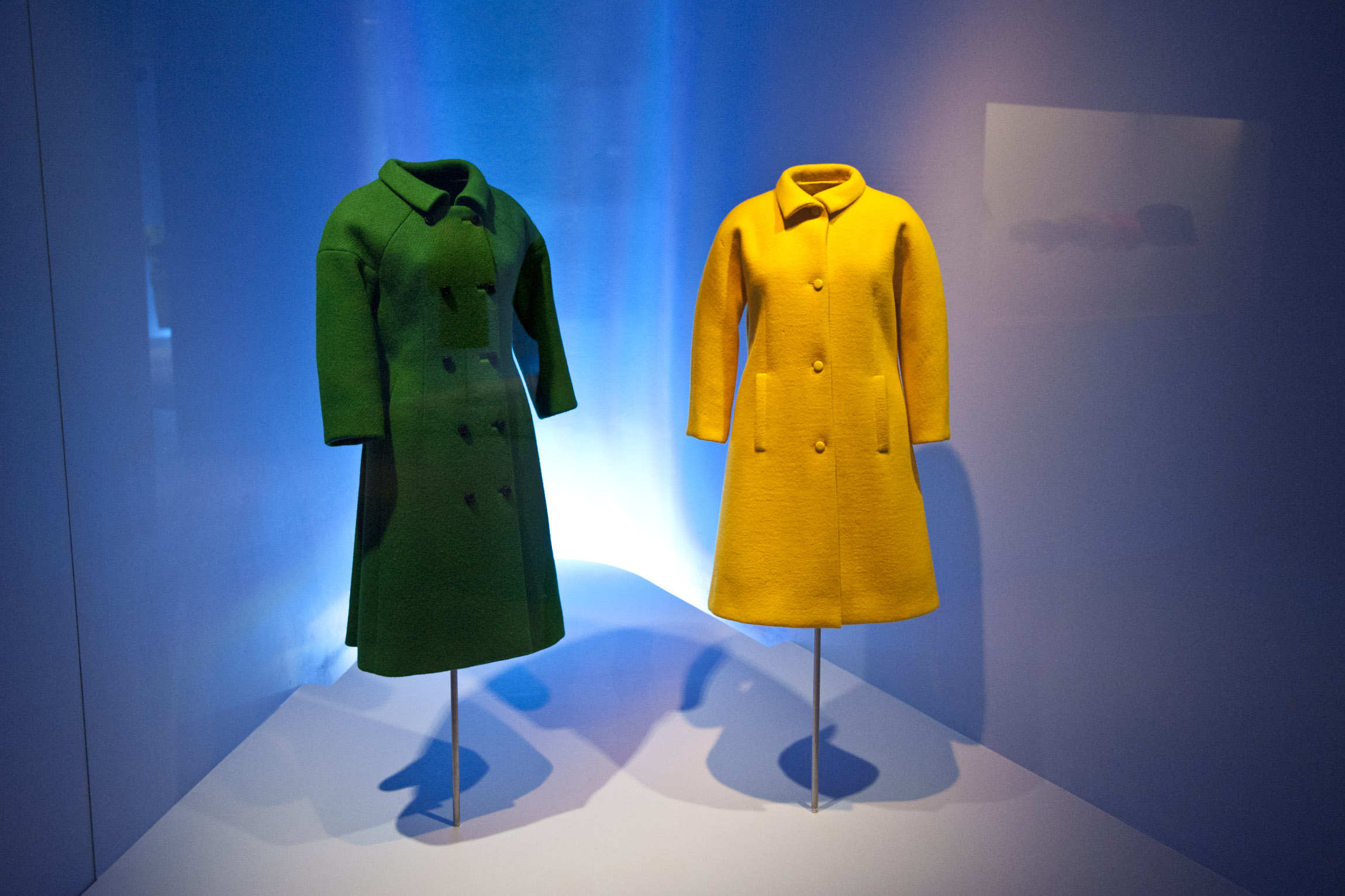
Coats (c. 1960). Cristóbal Balenciaga Museum

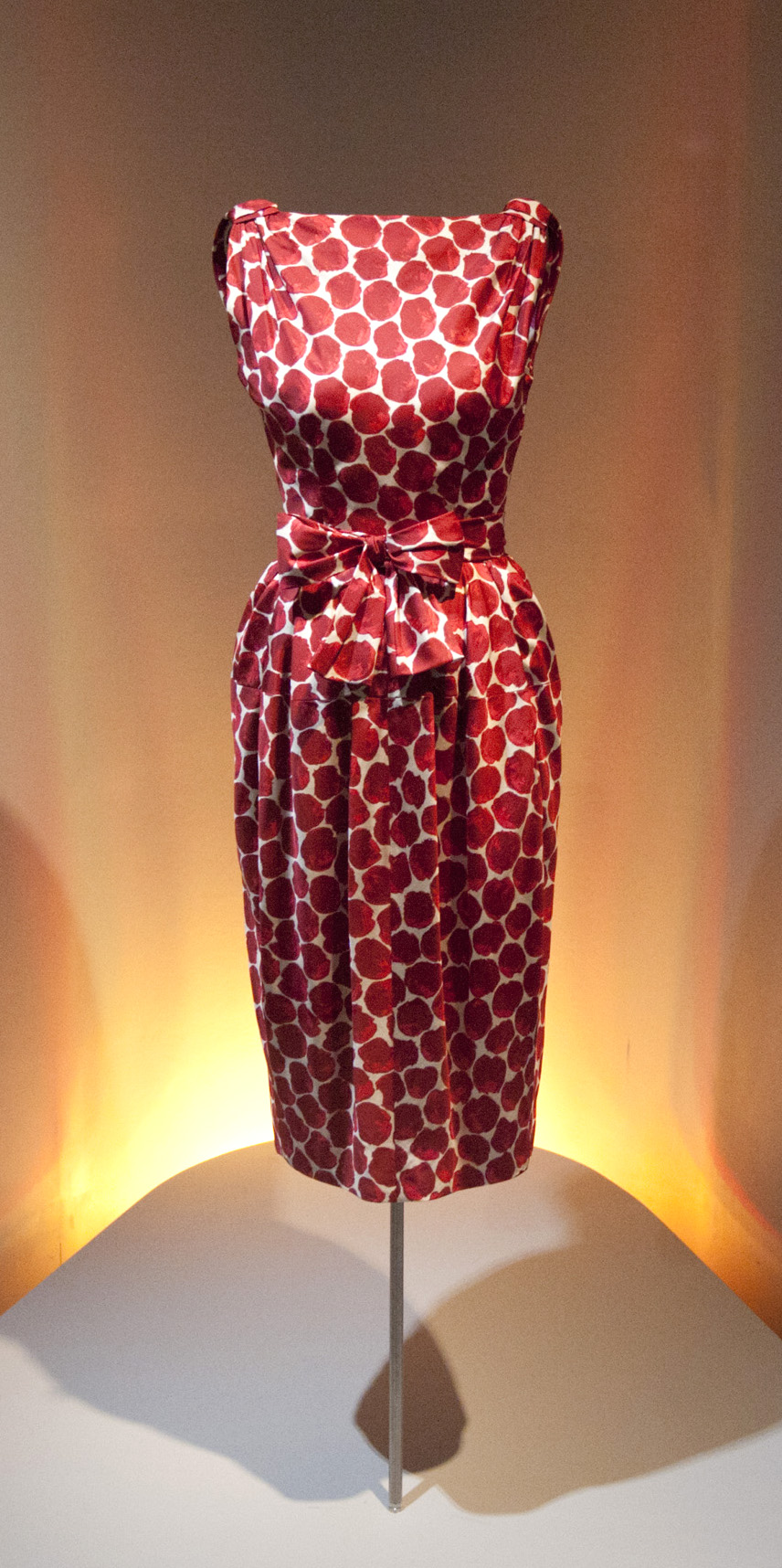
Printed silk dress (c. 1960). Cristóbal Balenciaga Museum

== Legacy ==
In the studio of Cristóbal Balenciaga, many couturiers formed, some of which would reach international fame and would get to have their own business. Among these include Paco Rabanne, André Courreges, Emanuel Ungaro, Hubert de Givenchy, or Óscar de la Renta.

=== Balenciaga brand ===
The closing of Balenciaga's high fashion house in 1968 did not signify the extinction of "Balenciaga’s brand". The brand was inactive until 1986 when Jacques Konckier of Jacques Bogart bought the Balenciaga company.

Although separate from its creator, Balenciaga has actively kept up in the fashion world since then as far as relevance. "His sense of proportion and measurement, and his vision and interpretation of the female body have anointed him as one of the more influential designers of all time". Balenciaga designs products of high fashion, ready-to-wear, perfumery, jewels, and other accessories. The Balenciaga business has mainly kept active in the perfumery and accessories spectrum. Popular items include the Motorcycle Bag, as well as their shoes due to their originality.

Today the Balenciaga fashion house continues under the direction of Cedric Charbit and under the ownership of the Kering group.

=== Presence in museums ===
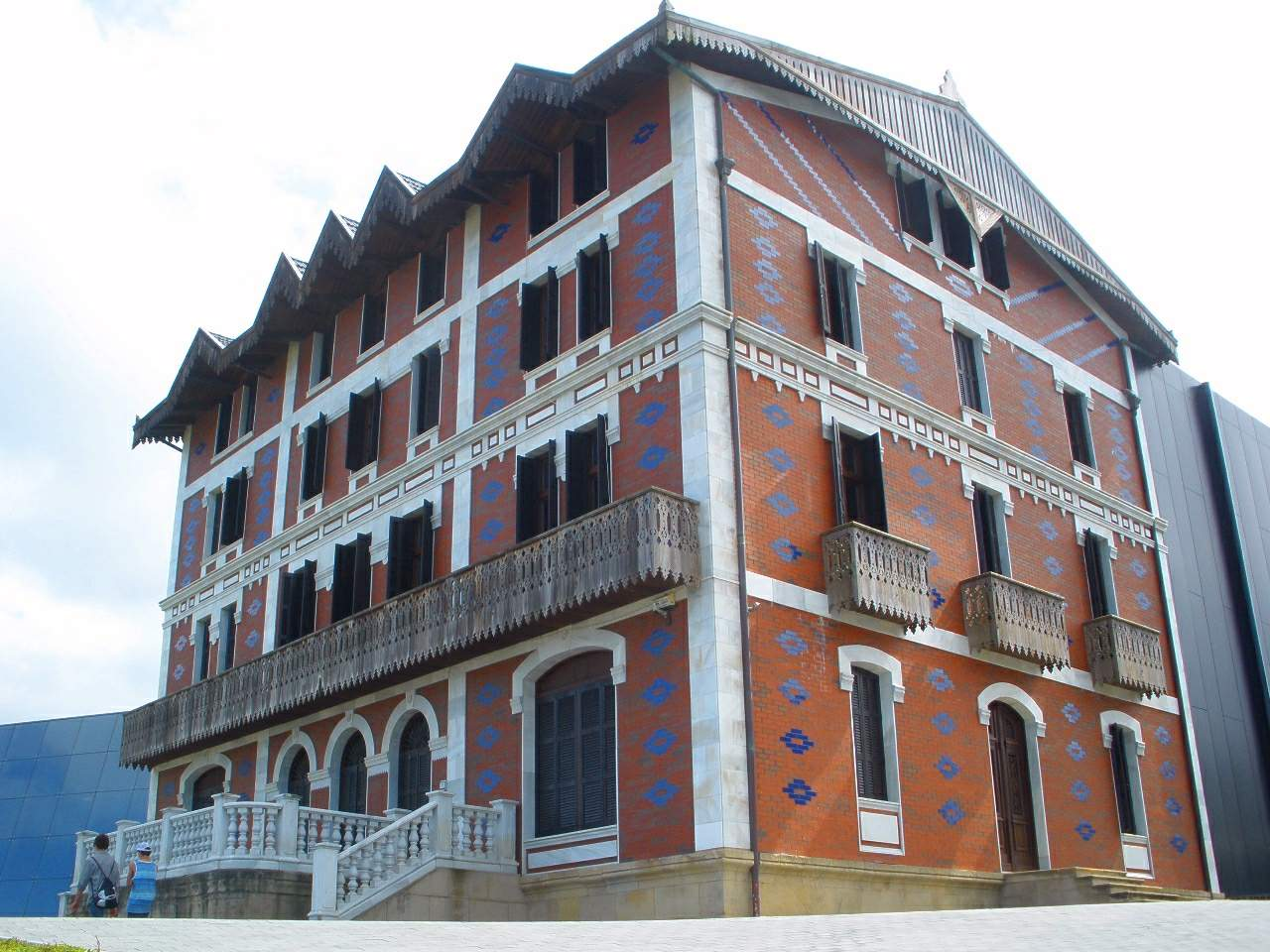
Cristóbal Balenciaga Museum in Getaria

In Getaria, a foundation was established with the objective of creating a museum dedicated to Cristóbal Balenciaga. After numerous problems and the avoided judicial process about alleged inconsistencies in its management, the Cristóbal Balenciaga Museum was inaugurated by Queen Sofía on 7 June 2011, with the presence of Hubert de Givenchy, who was the honorific president of the foundation. The museum opened on 10 June 2011. It has a collection of more than 1,200 pieces designed by him, some of them donations by disciples, like Givenchy, or clients, like Queen Fabiola – who donated her wedding dress to the foundation – and the heirs of Grace Kelly, although only one part displays simultaneously. The pieces are displayed on invisible mannequins.

The historic collection of the Museum of Textile and Clothing, that is part of the Design Museum of Barcelona, has an extensive number of dresses and accessories designed by Cristóbal Balenciaga, where its hats and headdresses stand out, for their great variety of shapes. The Museum of Garment (Madrid) also has a collection of dresses designed by him. Within these exhibitions and pieces, people can find, like seen in the Victoria and Albert Museum (London), "sculptural silhouettes that the forms of architecture drink from, in the geometric lines of their patterns and also in the set with the volumes that allowed to go without saying as far as unthinkable in 1958, with his babydoll model: inspired in children clothing, the dress left in flotation without pressure to the figure and with total freedom of movement to the user".

His work has been an object of numerous museum study expositions, starting with an anthology exposition that the Metropolitan Museum of Art (New York) provided in 1973, "The World of Balenciaga", which exhibited for six months, with 180 models on display. Balenciaga's garments accompanied the paintings of Goya, Velázquez, El Greco, Zuloaga, Miró or Picasso, in which they had inspired the designs of the Basque couturier. It was the first time that an art museum of the importance of the Metropolitan added dresses to the category of works of art. In Spain, a namesake exposition was also celebrated, which was installed in the noble living rooms of the Palace of Library and National Museums in Madrid.

On 24 March 2011, M. H. de Young Museum (San Francisco) celebrated the opening of "Balenciaga and Spain", a 120-piece fashion retrospective of his career. "You can't even measure it", said Rodarte designer Laura Mulleavy, of Balenciaga's influence. The $2,500-a-ticket fund-raiser for the museum drew 350 guests, including Marissa Mayer, Jamie Tisch, Gwyneth Paltrow, Orlando Bloom, Balthazar Getty, Maggie Rizer, Connie Nielsen, Maria Bello, and Mia Wasikowska.

The Queen Letizia of Spain wears a 1948 black dress and a 1962 fuchsia cape, designed by Balenciaga and owned by the Antoni de Montpalau Foundation, in the portrait made in 2024 by Annie Leibovitz for the Bank of Spain portrait gallery.

=== Cultural depictions ===
His friend, the sculptor Eduardo Chillida, made a sculpture-tribute called Homage to Balenciaga. San Sebastián, also pays homage with a promenade, that is situated in the neighborhood of Igeldo, where he had a house.

Cristóbal Balenciaga is a Disney+ biographical drama series starring Alberto San Juan in the titular role. Nuno Lopes plays Cristóbal Balenciaga in the Apple TV+ series about Christian Dior, The New Look. Javier Rey plays Cristóbal Balenciaga in the Telecinco drama miniseries Lo que escondían sus ojos.

== Bibliography ==
- Alzugaray, Juan José (2004). Vascos Relevantes Del Siglo XX (in Spanish). Ediciones Encuentro. p. 63.
- Arzalluz, Miren (2010). Cristóbal Balenciaga, la forja del maestro (1895–1936) (in Spanish). San Sebastián: Diputación Foral de Guipúzcoa.
- Azurmendi, Nerea (11 June 2011). "El Museo Se Viste De Diario". El Diario Vasco (in Spanish).
- Blume, M. (2013). The master of all us: Balenciaga, his workrooms, his world. Publishers Weekly.
- Bowles, H. (2010). Balenciaga and Spain. New York: Rizzoli.
- Bowles, H. (2 July 2017). "Shaping Fashion: Vogue's Hamish Bowles Explores a Buzzed-About Balenciaga Exhibition at the Victoria and Albert Museum". Vogue.
- Charleston, Beth Duncuff (October 2004). "Cristobal Balenciaga (1895–1972)". Heilbrunn Timeline of Art History. Metropolitan Museum of Art.
- de la Torriente, Eugenia (2 June 2011). "Balenciaga Vuelve Al Mar". El País (in Spanish).
- de la Torriente, Eugenia (11 May 2010). "La Geometría Estética De Balenciaga Vuelve a Casa". El País (in Spanish).
- Irvine, Susan (3 September 2013). "The mysterious Cristóbal Balenciaga". The Daily Telegraph. Archived from the original on 22 January 2015.
- Izaguirre, Boris (9 December 2016). "El Hijo De Un Pescador Que Se Convirtió En El Diseñador Español Más Famoso De La Historia". Vanity Fair España (in Spanish).
- Jouve, M. A.; Demornex, J. (1988). Balenciaga. Paris: Éditions du Regard.
- Jouve, M. A. (1998). Balenciaga. Assouline.
- Luengo, Pilar (15 November 1987). "Jacques Konckier". El País (in Spanish).
- Martínez Tato, Marta (23 March 2018). "El Legado De Balenciaga, Como Nunca Lo Habías Visto". Vanity Fair España (in Spanish).
- Menkes, Suzy (23 May 2000). "Museum to Open in Basque Designer's Birthplace : Temple to a Monk of Fashion". The New York Times.
- Miller, L. E. (1993). Cristóbal Balenciaga. London: Batsford.
- Miller, L. E. (2007). Cristóbal Balenciaga (1895–1972): The couturiers' couturier. New York, London: V&A Publications.
- Schillinger, L (2013). Opening up the couturier Cristobal Balencuaga. Paris: International Herald Tribune.
- Tubella, Patricia (2 June 2017). "Cristóbal Balenciaga Resucita En Una Gran Exposición En Londres". El País (in Spanish).
- España, 50 años de moda (in Spanish). Ajuntament de Barcelona. 1987–1988. p. 25.
