= Z-CARD =

ZCARD
- Industry: Marketing
- Founded: 2003
- Headquarters: NYC, US
- Area served: Worldwide
- Key people: George McDonald (Inventor); Liz Love (Managing Director)
- Revenue: £7 million (2011)
- Number of employees: 40 (June 2011)
- Website: www.zcardna.com

Z-CARD is the registered trademark for a foldable guide invented by George McDonald when he was a travel writer and consultant for British Airways.

== History ==
McDonald found that traditional fold-out maps were too bulky to carry with him on travel research trips and wanted a more convenient solution. From this the Z-CARD was developed and launched in 1992, with the company as it looks today being founded in 2003.

While Z-CARD pioneered the z-fold market from 1992, a number of other companies have since entered the market by producing their own take on the z-fold format. The original inspiration for the product came from the fold-out map format.

== Applications ==
The Z-CARD and similar products have been used for a range of applications, including internal corporate communications, product and services information and promotional merchandise across all major industries.

== Use of technology ==
In recent years, cards have featured technology such as Radio-frequency identification, QR codes and Augmented reality.

== Awards ==
In 2011, Z-CARD won the Chartered Institute of Marketing Excellence Award in the SME category. Previous winners of CIM awards include Saatchi & Saatchi, McCann Erickson and JCDecaux.

In 2010, Z-CARD won South London Business of the Year and the Best Business for Marketing categories at the South London Business Awards.

== See also ==
- Brochure
- Business card
- Comp card
- Folded leaflet
- Marketing collateral
- Merchant Mariner's Document
- Pamphlet
