= Cristóbal Balenciaga Museum =

Fashion museum in Getaria, Spain

- Cristóbal Balenciaga Museoa
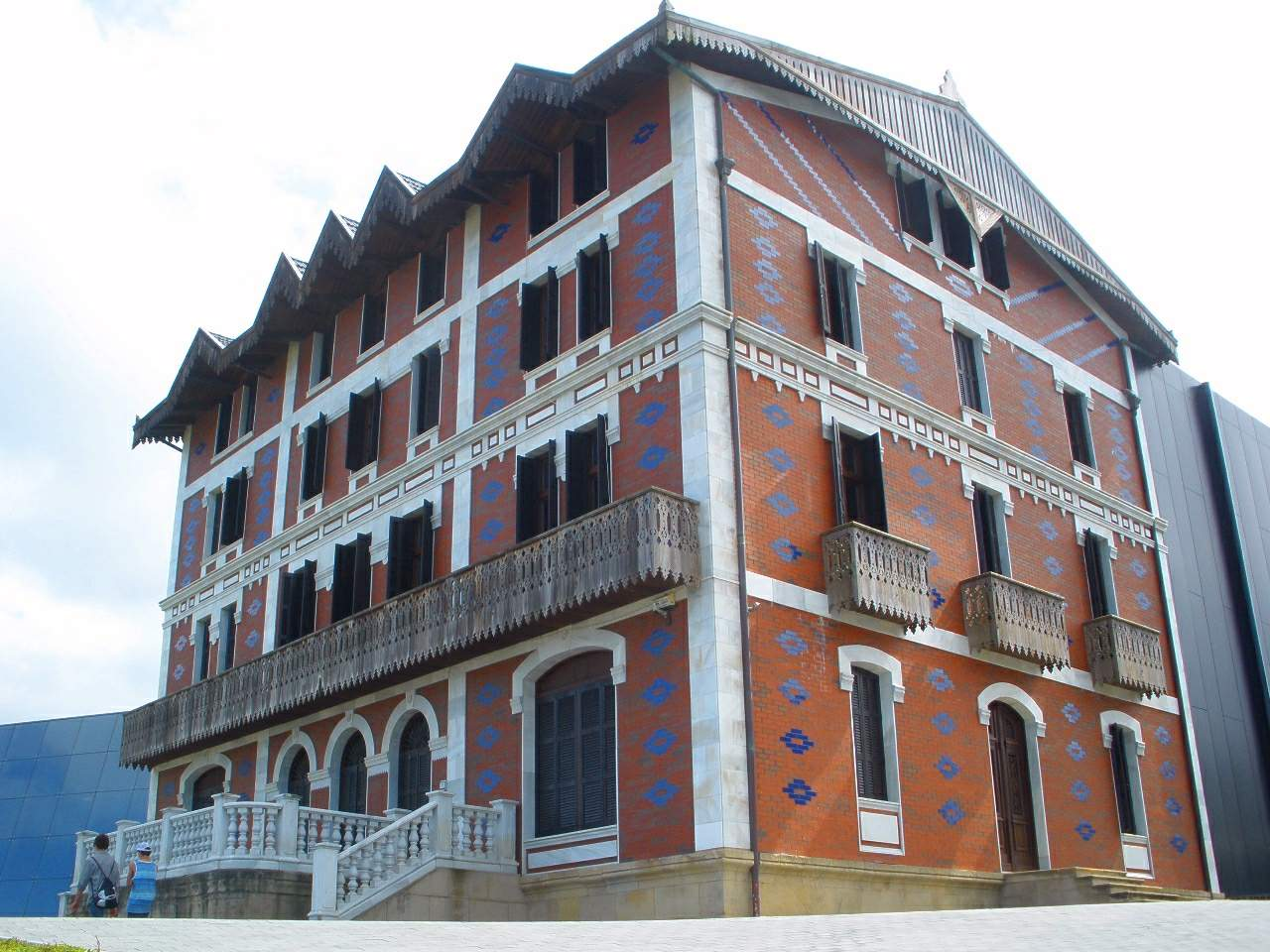
- The Aldamar Palace, which houses part of the museum, in Getaria
- Established: 11 June 2011
- Location: Aldamar Parkea 6, Getaria, Gipuzkoa, Basque Country, Spain
- Type: Fashion museum;
- Collection size: More than 1,200 models, plus photographs and objects
- Visitors: About 53,000 (2018)
- Director: Miren Vives
- Architects: Julián Argilagos (building); AV62arquitectos (interiors and museography)
- Owner: Cristóbal Balenciaga Foundation
- Website: www.cristobalbalenciagamuseoa.com

The Cristóbal Balenciaga Museum (Basque: Cristóbal Balenciaga Museoa; Spanish: Museo Cristóbal Balenciaga) is a public museum in Getaria, a fishing town on the coast of the Basque Country, Spain, dedicated to the life and work of the couturier Cristóbal Balenciaga, who was born there. It opened to the public in June 2011 and is run by the Cristóbal Balenciaga Foundation.

The museum occupies the Aldamar Palace, once the home of the Marquises of Casa Torres, together with a new building added beside it. Its permanent exhibition shows around a hundred pieces from a collection of more than 1,200 models. The collection includes major donations from the American collector Bunny Mellon. The museum also organises temporary exhibitions and academic congresses, and reported more than 500,000 visits in its first decade.

== History ==
=== Foundation ===
The Cristóbal Balenciaga Foundation is a public-sector body constituted on 7 October 1999 and entered in the Register of Foundations of the Basque Country on 27 November 2000. Its stated mission is to promote, develop and publicise the figure and work of Balenciaga. The Spanish State (through the Ministry of Culture), the Basque Government, the Provincial Council of Gipuzkoa and the Getaria Town Council are represented in it.

=== Construction and opening ===
The museum is housed in the Aldamar Palace, formerly the home of the Marquises of Casa Torres, who were early mentors of Balenciaga, to which a new annex was added. The volumetric and structural concept of the new building was the work of Julián Argilagos, while AV62arquitectos designed its final form, interiors and museography.

The studio AV62 arquitectos won a public competition for the museum's interior design when the new building was already practically built, and it was also in charge of resolving the façade and interior finishes and of designing the permanent exhibition. According to the studio, the museum has a surface area of 5,988 m².

When it opened in 2011, the museum was reported to have been completed about eight years behind schedule and at a cost of around €30 million, financed by the Basque Government (35%), the Provincial Council of Gipuzkoa (35%) and the Spanish Ministry of Culture (30%), with the Getaria town council providing the land rights. The delays and the management of the project later led to legal proceedings concerning the building's construction.

The museum was inaugurated on 7 June 2011 and opened to the public on 11 June 2011. It is registered in the Register of Museums of the Basque Country.

Construction began in 2000, and the works were originally due to finish in 2003. According to RTVE, a judicial investigation into the management of the foundation and the company in charge of the project halted the works, led to a change of architect and to the cancellation of funding from the Ministry of Culture; they resumed in 2008, after the Basque Government, the Provincial Council of Gipuzkoa and the central government covered a deficit of 1.5 million euros. The initial budget had been six million euros; RTVE put the final cost at more than twenty million, while La Vanguardia reported thirty million. The investigation was still open when the museum was inaugurated.

=== Management ===
On 27 June 2011 the foundation's board of trustees elected Javier González de Durana, a historian and former director of Artium in Vitoria-Gasteiz, as the museum's first director. The museum has since been directed by Miren Vives, an economist trained at the University of Deusto, who in 2019 described a strategy of positioning the museum as a sustainable institution with an impact beyond Getaria, including a programme bringing university students from cities such as New York, London and Tokyo to research Balenciaga.

== Collection ==
When it opened, the museum displayed 90 of the more than 1,200 pieces gathered through loans and donations, arranged as if it were a haute couture show: it began with a room on Balenciaga's early years, including a suit from 1912, the oldest in the collection, followed by day dresses of the 1950s and 1960s, cocktail dresses, evening wear and a room of wedding dresses, among them the one made for the wedding of Fabiola de Mora y Aragón and King Baudouin of Belgium in December 1960. The garments were to be changed every year for conservation reasons.

The permanent exhibition is organised in six rooms spread over two floors, each with its own title: Beginnings (Comienzos), Day (Día), Night (Noche), Versus (the most representative pieces), Cocktail (Cóctel) and Brides (Novias). The lighting of the building and of the galleries was designed by the studio La Invisible, led by María Güell, in collaboration with AV62 arquitectos.

The permanent exhibition presents around 100 pieces, drawn from a collection of more than 1,200 models that are rotated. According to press reports, the collection grew from 2,950 items at the opening to 5,559 by 2019, and now includes photographs and objects as well as garments.

An important part of the holdings comes from donations made between 2004 and 2014 by the American philanthropist and collector Bunny Mellon, comprising 660 garments, 138 sketches and 250 documents.

== Exhibitions and activities ==
The museum organises exhibitions on Balenciaga's work and on related designers and themes, several of which have travelled to other institutions. By its tenth anniversary in 2021 it had held 16 exhibitions centred on Balenciaga, and had made more than 400 loans to institutions including the Victoria and Albert Museum, the Metropolitan Museum of Art and the Museo Thyssen-Bornemisza; temporary shows included Balenciaga y el cine and, at the time, Alaïa y Balenciaga, developed with the Azzedine Alaïa Foundation. In October 2020, on the 125th anniversary of Balenciaga's birth, it held its first international online congress. In May 2025 it opened Las Sutilezas de un Diálogo (The Subtleties of a Dialogue), presented as the first exhibition by the Balenciaga fashion house in a museum setting, with 31 creations by Cristóbal Balenciaga and by Demna, the house's creative director; it ran until 11 January 2026.

In March 2013 the museum opened Balenciaga y la alta costura en Barcelona. Proximidades y distancias (Balenciaga and Haute Couture in Barcelona: Proximities and Distances), curated by the art historian Josep Casamartina, on Balenciaga's relationship with the Barcelona couturiers of his time, as he had a workshop in the city between 1935 and 1968. The show brought together nearly 80 garments, twelve of them by Balenciaga, alongside pieces by Catalan contemporaries such as Pedro Rodríguez, Santa Eulalia, Carmen Mir and Pertegaz and by later designers such as Josep Font, who acknowledge his influence, and it ran until the end of July 2013.

== Visitors and impact ==
The museum reported more than 500,000 visits in its first decade. In 2018 it received about 53,000 visitors. A study by the consultancy EY published in September 2021 estimated the museum's total contribution to the economy at €14.8 million over its first ten years, and 767 jobs generated by visits; annual operating costs were nearly €1.5 million, about 75% of which came from public institutions.

== See also ==
- Cristóbal Balenciaga
- Balenciaga
