= La Lechera =

Nestle brand in spain

- Product type: Dairy products
- Current owner: Nestlé
- Produced by: Nestlé
- Country: Switzerland
- Introduced: 1921; 105 years ago
- Related brands: Leite Moça, in Brazil
- Markets: Latin America, Spain
- Website: goodnes.com/lalechera

La Lechera (lit. 'the milkmaid' in Spanish) or Leite Moça (in Portuguese) is a Nestlé brand, producing various dairy products. The brand was established in 1921 and markets its products in Latin America, Spain and also among Hispanic populations in the United States.

It is best known worldwide for its dry milk products and sweetened condensed milk, but also produces yogurts (in Argentina), dulce de leche, and other dessert products ("postres") such as puddings, cookies, chocolates, and ice creams for various markets.

In Brazil, La Lechera is called "Leite Moça".

== Other products ==
- La Lechera Fat Free - A fat-free version of the product
- La Lechera Flakes - A sweetened breakfast cereal, consisting of corn flakes.
- La Lecherita - A mini and low fat version of a 14-ounce can, weighing 100 grams per can. Focused more on children and with a cartoony version of the mascot.
- Mocinha - A snack version of La Lecherita and with different flavors, sold only in Brazil between the late 90s and early 2000s, and relaunched limited in 2021 as "Moça Mini".
