= Mother agent =

A mother agent is an agent who directly oversees and represents a fashion model. Mother agents usually are the first to discover a model, and help them learn about the industry and build a portfolio. They often decide which modeling agencies are best for the model and share in the commissions.

A mother agent can serve as a mentor who guides the model throughout his or her career. Typically, the mother agent is paid once they place a model with a booking agency in a larger location such as New York, Los Angeles, London, Chicago, and so forth. They take a percentage, normally 10%, of every booking that the booking agency books. A mother agent can also take a standard 20% commission from anything they book themselves. However, a true mother agent does not book but places their models to booking agencies. Some mother agents book on a smaller level to develop the model or for extra money. Mother agents are often the scouts who initially find, recruit, and train the models, and subsequently locate agencies and opportunities for the models.

Mother agents serve more as personal managers, whereas regular modeling agencies typically take care of the logistics of booking jobs while operate on a less personal and larger level. The two are not mutually exclusive, as some modeling agencies can also serve as mother agencies. Whereas mother agencies are often also based in smaller cities and lesser-known locations (in addition to larger cities such as New York, Los Angeles, London, Paris, etc.), larger international agencies are typically based in large metropolitan centers with established fashion industries, such as New York, Paris, Milan, Dubai, Hong Kong, Tokyo, and other major cities.

== See also ==
- Modeling agency
- Talent agent
