= Comp card =

Marketing tool for actors and models

Comp cards

A comp card (also called composite card, Z card, zed card or Sed card) is a marketing tool for actors and especially models. They serve as the latest and best of a model's portfolio and are used as a business card. A Z-CARD is also a folded leaflet format, typically used for marketing communications campaigns for example a loyalty programme or seasonal promotion.

== History ==
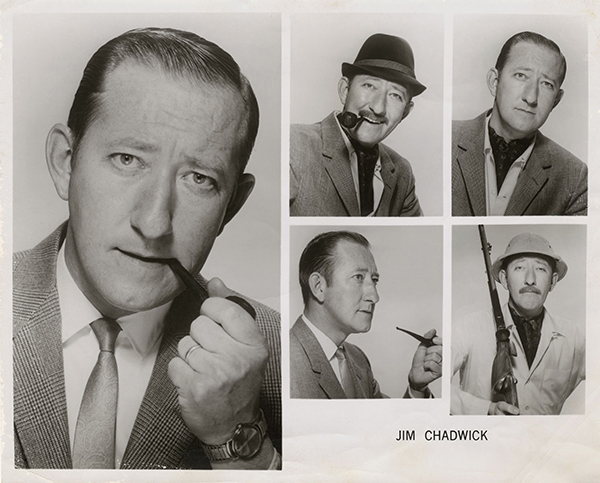
Jim Chadwick’s Comp Card 1969

Peter Marlowe in London invented models composites in 1965, then printed on paper to A4 format. The format was changed in 1972 to A5 card format, for filing purposes, and a few other companies started publishing cards for the model industry under different trade names since Peter Marlowe had registered the trademark "Model Composite" in Europe and the United States. Amongst these was Sebastian Sed who traded under the name Sed Cards, which are sometimes mis-pronounced as Z ("Zed") or Set cards. The publishing house of Marlowe Press stopped trading in 1990 and the words "models composites" and "comp cards" became generic within the model industry. Comp card databases and creation tools have moved online in recent years.

== Format ==
A comp card typically contains a minimum of two pages – a cover page with full size portrait and a second page with a selection of representative shots from the portfolio. It lists the model's basic stats – typically height, weight, three sizes (bust, waist, hips) for women, suit or chest size and waist and inseam sizes for men, plus shoe size, eye and hair color, nationality and contact information. It is printed on both sides of an 8.5" x 5.5" piece of card stock (12 pt stock) (US) or A5 on card weight (350/400 g/m^{2} stock in metric countries) which is between 300 and 450 μm thick depending on the card stock or quality chosen (Europe, Asia).

== Use ==
Comp cards have been around for many years as the essential marketing tool for a model and are likely to retain this standing because they are an inexpensive way to effectively and professionally showcase a model's ability. Composite cards are used on three major levels – they are used by models, agents and the agent's client.

Comp card is designed to provide an overview. So agency scouts need some shots of very different looks in a variety of outfits in different locations. Depending on the desired application, the model shows its particularly useful sides in various angles, such as face, hairstyle, arms or legs, or even the whole body.

Black and white and color photographs are designed to showcase the model's full personality and include both facial and full body images.

== Production ==
Currently, models have many different options of creating comp cards. They can ask their photographer or create their own on their computers using image editing or graphics software. In addition, with technology's increasingly strong influence in the digital market, many printing companies have looked to the internet to facilitate the ordering process. Comp card printing prices can vary depending on the number of pictures used on the card, the type of paper stock used, and the general printing quality. Different layout styles are available or can be created.

There are digital comp cards. They are easy to share and update. Models can send links to their modeling portfolio sites via email or social media so clients can see their latest work. The advantage of digital comp cards is that they are a more cost-effective option as they do not need to be printed. They are also more environmentally friendly as they don't require paper and ink.

When working for a modeling agency, usually the comp card is made by the agency itself. The agency selects the best photos to showcase the model's skills. However, freelance models make their own comp card.
