= The Attico =

Italian fashion label

The Attico S.r.l.
- Type: Società a responsabilità limitata
- Industry: Fashion; Design
- Founded: 2016; 10 years ago Milan, Italy
- Founders: Gilda Ambrosio; Giorgia Tordini
- Headquarters: Milan, Italy
- Area served: Worldwide
- Key people: Stefano Marcovaldi, CEO)
- Products: Fashion - RTW and accessories; Design
- Revenue: €23 million (2025)
- Net income: ▲€747.000 (2025); €247.000 (2024)
- Number of employees: 39 (2021)
- Website: theattico.com

The Attico is a Milan-based fashion label founded in 2016 by designers and creative directors Gilda Ambrosio and Giorgia Tordini.

The label has partnered with Nike Air Jordan, Sant Ambroeus, Eres, Linda Farrow, and Re/Done. It is distributed worldwide with over 200 top retailers, boutiques, and concept stores.

== History ==
The Attico was launched in 2016 by two fashion designers, Giorgia Tordini and Gilda Ambrosio. The Attico is the Italian word for "penthouse." Initially, the designers launched the line around luxury dressing gowns and going-out attire.

Following the label's debut, The Attico founders were profiled in American Vogue's May 2016 and 2017 issues. In 2017, the designers were awarded "Launch of the Year" at the 31st annual Footwear News Achievement Awards in New York City and listed as part of The BOF 500, a professional index of people shaping the fashion industry. In 2018, Archive, an investment firm controlled by ou(R) group (Remo Ruffini's family holding), acquired 49% of the brand. The acquisition led to a shifting of brand strategy and overall company restructuring, naming Stefano Marcovaldi chief executive officer.

In 2019, Giorgia Tordini moved back to Milan to officially launch The Attico with Gilda Ambrosio during Milan Fashion Week. Also in 2019, The Attico founders were honored with "The Young Business Award" by the Altagamma Foundation, an institution supporting emerging companies within the Italian cultural and creative industry.

In 2020 Alessandro Vigilante was hired as the brand's creative director. The Attico launched pop-up shops and installations at luxury retailers such as Harrods, Selfridges, The Webster, Bergdorf, Beymen, La Rinascente, and Level Shoes. In September 2022, during New York Fashion Week, The Attico launched its first pop-up retail concept in New York. Within the 2022 Salone Mobile fair, The Attico launched a design exhibition with the New York-based gallery Superhouse to host its semi-annual exhibition in Milan, Italy.

In July 2023, Maurizio Iapicca replaced Vigilante as creative director. In September 2023, The Attico hosted its first fashion show during Milan Fashion Week. Since 2023, the brand has been facing a financial crisis, with a decline in revenue of 93% drop in net income from 2023 to 2024, falling from 3.8 million to 247,000 Euro in 2024.

The Attico received attention from fashion magazines, retail stores, and celebrities. It has been worn by Dua Lipa, Beyonce, Rhianna, Kylie Jenner, Hailey Bieber, and more. Initially launched around luxury dressing gowns and going-out attire, the label included ready-to-wear offering, shoes, bags, beachwear and leisurewear.

== Governance ==
The creative direction of The Attico was managed by the brand's founders Ambrosio and Tordini from its foundation until July 2020.

Creative directors

- 2023–present: Maurizio Iapicca
- 2020–2023: Alessandro Vigilante
