= Clifton Hall, Cumbria =

Manor house in Cumbria, England

Clifton Hall
- Cumbria, England
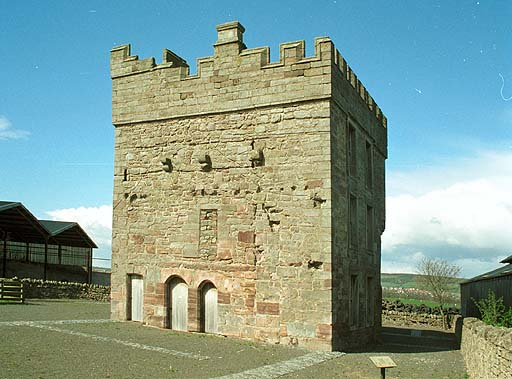
- Surviving pele tower of Clifton Hall

Site information
- Type: Fortified manor house and pele tower
- Owner: English Heritage
- Open to the public: Yes

Location
- Shown within Cumbria
- Coordinates: 54.6368°N 2.7297°W
- Grid reference: grid reference NY530271

Site history
- Materials: Red sandstone
- Events: Jacobite risings

Clifton Hall was a fortified manor house in the village of Clifton, Cumbria. Dating from around 1400, it was constructed by either Elianor Engaine or her son-in-law William Wybergh, and was held by the Wybergh family until the 19th century. Initially taking the form of an "H"-plan design built around a central hall, around 1500 a three-storey stone pele tower was added, providing both additional security and acting as a status symbol for the family. At the start of the 17th century a new stone hall was added to the south of the tower.

The Wyberghs were able to retain Clifton Hall, despite the challenges of the English Civil War, but the house was caught up in the Jacobite risings of 1715 and 1745. In the early 19th century most of Clifton Hall was pulled down to make way for a new farmhouse, and only the pele tower survived. In the 21st century the tower is in the care of English Heritage and operates as a tourist attraction.

== History ==
=== 15th – 16th centuries ===
Clifton Hall was originally built around 1400 in the village of Clifton, south of Penrith, Cumbria, by either Elianor Engaine or her son-in-law William Wybergh. The Engaines had held the manor of Clifton since at least the 12th century, providing military service to the regional feudal lords in exchange for the land, and may have built an earlier manor house on a different site, possibly close to the village church of St Cuthbert. Clifton Hall was initially constructed around an "H"-plan, with a central hall bracketed by two cross-wings, one wing containing the family's living accommodation, the other the kitchen and the other service rooms. This style was popular at this time across Cumbria, and indeed England more generally.

William Wybergh and his descendants owned and lived in Clifton Hall until the 19th century. Around 1500, the three-storey tower that survives today was built onto the western end of the range, replacing the existing buildings there. "H"-plan houses with towers were common during this period, but the towers were often added on subsequently; the tower was probably constructed by Elianor's grandson, another William Wybergh. The tower was probably built in response to the security situation along the troubled Anglo-Scottish border at the time, but it would also have made a social statement about the status and wealth of the Wybergh family, and would have provided additional accommodation. A timber building was then built early in the 15th century to the south of the tower, probably to provide further chambers.

=== 17th – 18th centuries ===
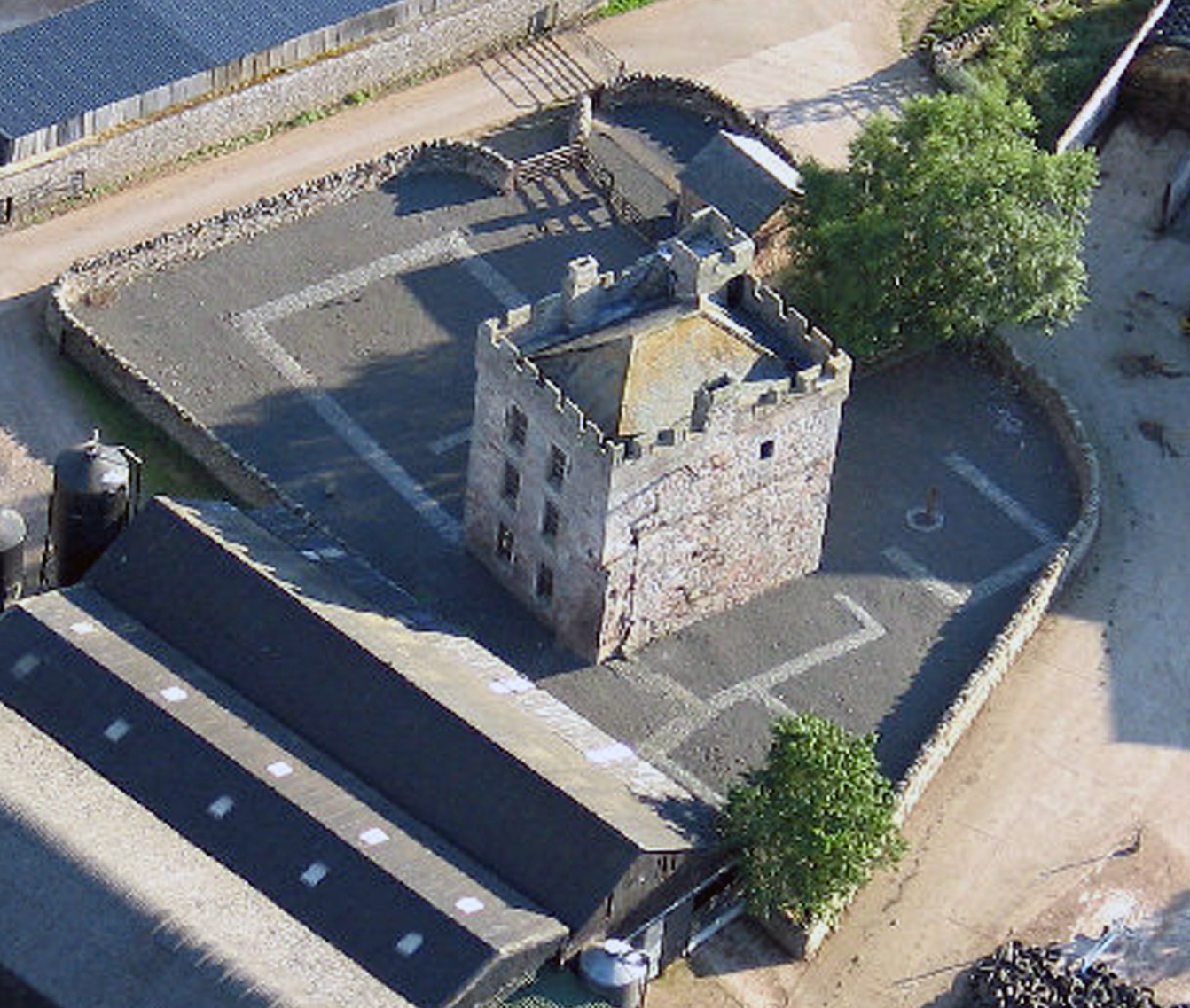
Aerial photograph of the hall in 2005

At the start of the 17th century, possibly around 1600, a new hall was built in stone to replace the older timber-framed one; it was positioned to the south, replacing the earlier 15th-century extension. The new hall was slightly anachronistic, having only one floor, unlike most new halls from this period which had two storeys. The old hall was then probably adapted for use as a service area.

After this investment, the Wybergh family's fortunes began to deteriorate. When the English Civil War broke out in 1642 between the supporters of King Charles I and Parliament, Thomas Wybergh was a Royalist supporter and found himself on the losing side in the war. He was fined by Parliament as a Royalist "delinquent" in 1652, and mortgaged the surrounding manor to Sir John Lowther for £846, but not the hall itself or the lands immediately to the north. The mortgage led to a prolonged legal dispute, and in 1706 John's grandson successfully claimed the mortgaged estates, in exchange for giving the Wybergh's £400.

Further work was done on the property in the early 18th century, providing an additional service room and bedrooms. The Jacobite risings of 1715 and 1745 impacted on the hall, which was close to the Scottish border. In 1715, William Wybergh, the owner, was abducted by Scottish soldiers, and in 1745, shortly before the Clifton Moor Skirmish, it was occupied and looted by the rebel forces.

=== 19th – 21st centuries ===
By the early 19th century, the medieval structure of the property had become quite limiting for the owners. The buildings on either side of the tower were then pulled down to allow for the construction of Hall Farm, including a more modern farm house; only the tower survived to become an ancillary farm building. In 1973 the Lonsdale Estate, who owned Hall Farm, placed the tower into the guardianship of the Department of the Environment, who decided to open it to the public. An archaeological excavation of the site took place between 1977 and 1979, making it one of only a handful of such sites in Cumbria to have been investigated in this way. In the 21st century the tower is in the care of English Heritage as a tourist attraction, and is protected under UK law as a scheduled monument.

== Architecture ==
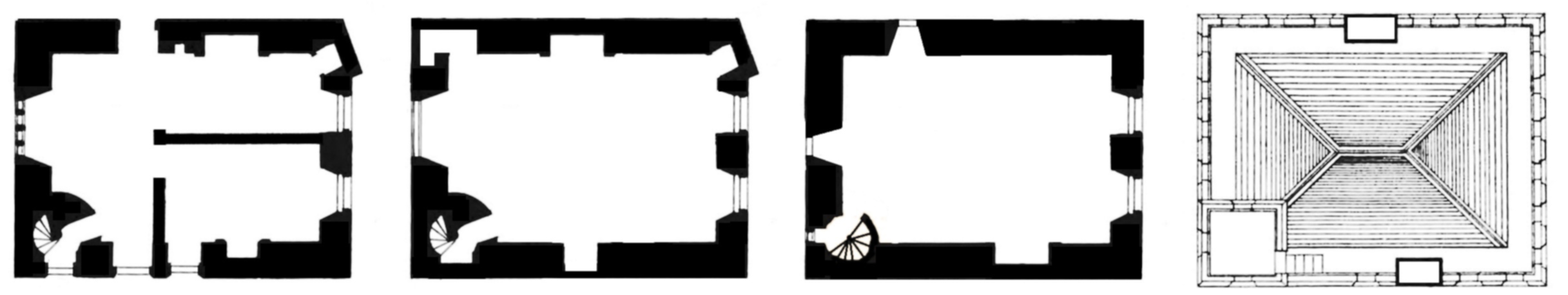
Plan of Clifton Hall: (l to r) Ground floor; first floor; second floor; roof

The only surviving part of Clifton Hall is the early 16th-century tower wing of the hall, often referred to as a pele tower. Despite this label, its construction date is relatively late compared to similar fortifications, and it is less robustly designed than equivalent towers in the region.

The tower measures 33 ft (10 m) by 26 ft (7.9 m), with red sandstone walls around 3 ft (0.91 m) thick and 37 ft (11 m) high. The ground floor was originally the parlour, with a carved wooden ceiling and a fireplace, with doors leading externally and into the hall. Originally, the stairs did not reach down to the ground floor. The first floor formed the principal chamber in the tower, accessed from stairs in the hall; it had a fireplace, a garderobe and its walls would have been plastered and painted, with wood panelling. Stairs led up to the second floor, again equipped with a fireplace and wood panelling, and up onto the roof.

Few of the original windows survive in the tower, but those that remain are larger than in some of the other older peles, suggesting it may have been built with defence less in mind than in some earlier pele towers. The originals have mainly been replaced by 17th- and 18th-century versions. The original roof would have resembled that at nearby Yanwath Hall, but was replaced at a later date with the current hipped-roof design, probably during the late 16th or the 17th century. The current roof was further restored in 1979.

== See also ==
- Castles in Great Britain and Ireland
- List of castles in England

== Bibliography ==
- Emery, Anthony (1996). Greater Medieval Houses of England and Wales, 1300–1500: Northern England. Cambridge, UK: Cambridge University Press. ISBN 978-0-521-49723-7.
- Fairclough, G. (1980). "Clifton Hall, Cumbria: Excavations 1977–79" (PDF). Transactions of the Cumberland and Westmorland Antiquarian and Archaeological Society. 80: 45–68. doi:10.5284/1061873.
- Taylor, M. W. (1892). Old Manorial Halls of Westmorland and Cumberland. Kendal, UK: T. Wilson. OCLC 22355479.
