= Kesewa Aboah =

British artist and model (born 1994)

- Born: Kesewa Arbell Lavinia Aboah; May 1994 (age 32); Westminster, London, England
- Education: School of Visual Arts
- Occupations: Artist; model
- Parent: Camilla Lowther (mother)
- Relatives: Adwoa Aboah (sister)
- Modelling information
- Height: 1.80 m (5 ft 11 in)
- Hair colour: Brown
- Eye colour: Brown
- Agency: DNA Models (New York); VIVA Model Management (Paris, Barcelona, London) (mother agency)

Kesewa Arbell Lavinia Aboah (born May 1994) is a British artist and model.

== Early life and family ==
Aboah was born in London, England, to Charles Aboah, a Ghanaian location scout in the fashion industry and former barrister clerk, and Camilla Lowther, a British fashion businesswoman and talent manager. Her maternal grandmother was an American from California, named Lavinia (née Joyce). The Lowther family are members of the British nobility, headed by the Earl of Lonsdale. Aboah's maternal great-grandfather was Anthony Lowther, Viscount Lowther, the son of Lancelot Lowther, 6th Earl of Lonsdale. She is a grandniece of James Lowther, 7th Earl of Lonsdale. Through her father, she is related to the Ghanaian politician William Kwasi Aboah. Aboah is the younger sister of fashion model and activist Adwoa Aboah and a second cousin of fashion model Matilda Lowther.

Aboah was educated at Millfield, a boarding school in Somerset, and later obtained an art degree from the School of Visual Arts in New York City.

== Career ==
=== Modelling ===
Aboah is signed with VIVA Model Management and DNA Models. She had her first modelling job when she was six years old, modelling for the brand Jigsaw. She has modelled in advertisement campaigns for Alexander McQueen and Miu Miu. In 2010 Aboah and her sister were featured in an advertisement campaign for H&M.

In 2017 she walked the runway for Coach New York's AW17 fashion show. In September 2018, Aboah, alongside her sister, Adwoa, and her cousin, Alewya Demmisse, were photographed by Mario Sorrenti as the faces of MANGO's AW18 campaign TOGETHER. She has been featured in Vogue, The Telegraph Magazine, Love, and i-D and has modelled for Marc Jacobs, Michael Kors, and Burberry. She was photographed alongside Kate Moss for Love magazine's LOVE 18.

In November 2018, Aboah was featured in ASAP Rocky's music video for the song "Sundress".

In February 2019, she walked the runway for Simone Rocha's Fall 2019 fashion show. In September 2019, Aboah was the face of Links of London's Brutalist campaign.

=== Art ===
Pierre Lagrange, who was already acquainted with the Aboah family, was introduced to Aboah's artwork via social media. He commissioned her to create a canvas of work for H. Huntsman & Sons. Her finished work, titled The Joy in Dancing With My Sisters, was then created into a bespoke jacket design for the brand. She was commissioned to create a second piece for Huntsman's display window, which she titled All The Women And Me.

Aboah completed an artist's residency in Ísafjörður, Iceland before starting another residency in Mexico.

== See also ==
- Black British nobility, the class that Aboah belongs to.
