= Signe Veiteberg =

Norwegian fashion model

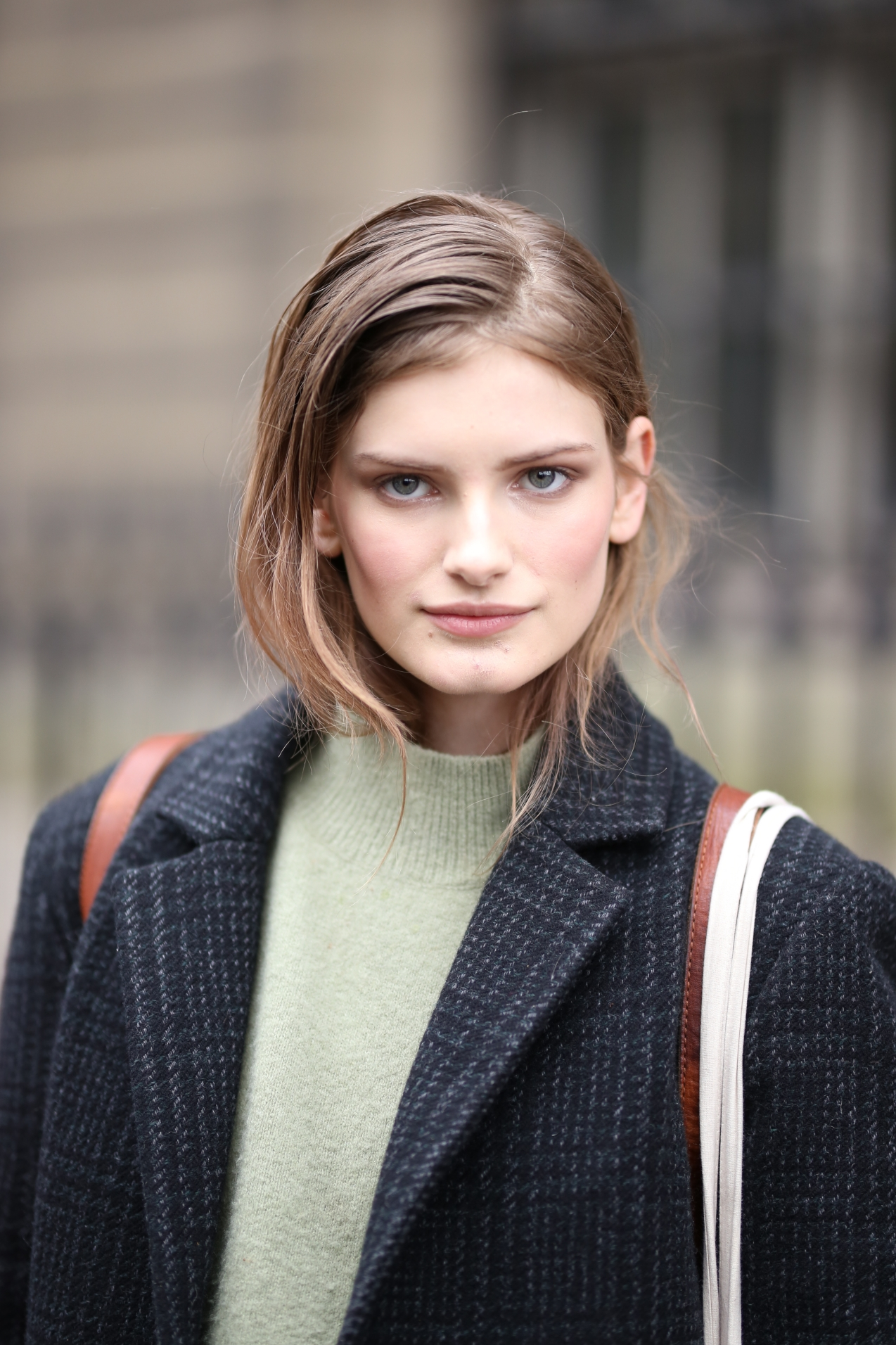
- Veiteberg in 2020
- Born: Signe Sommerfeldt Veiteberg; 25 December 1999; Drøbak, Norway
- Occupation: Model
- Modeling information
- Height: 1.80 m (5 ft 11 in)
- Hair color: Blonde
- Eye color: Blue-green
- Agency: DNA Models (New York); VIVA Model Management (Paris, London, Barcelona); MIKAs (Stockholm); Team Models (Oslo) (mother agency)

Signe Sommerfeldt Veiteberg (born 25 December 1999) is a Norwegian fashion model. After debuting as both a Prada exclusive and a Louis Vuitton exclusive in 2017, she has worked extensively with the latter fashion house.

== Early life ==
Veiteberg comes from the town of Drøbak in Frogn, Akershus County, Norway and has a brother.

== Career ==
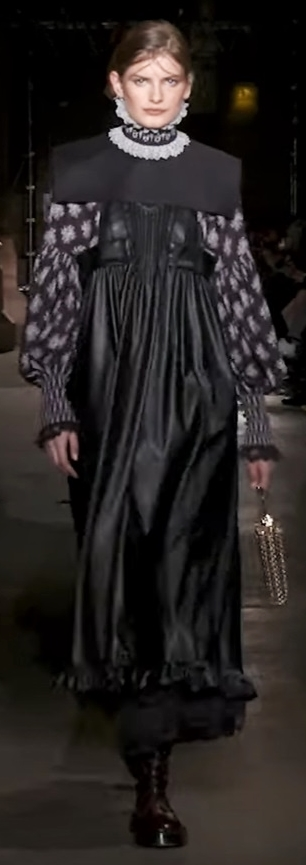
Veiteberg walks the runway at the Paco Rabanne Fall-Winter 2020-2021 show

Veiteberg started her career by submitting photos to a local Norwegian modeling agency. She debuted as a Prada exclusive in 2017 for the S/S 2018 season. as well as a Louis Vuitton exclusive. Veiteberg has had an exclusive contract to work for the Louis Vuitton brand since the very beginning of her career. She appeared in a jewelry advertisement alongside Sophie Turner, Chloë Grace Moretz, Indya Moore, and Zhong Chuxi, as well as solo advertisements and opening its Resort 2020 fashion show and closing its shows. To date, the only other luxury brands besides Vuitton that Veiteberg has done an advertisement for are Ports 1961, Piaget, and Hermès. She has walked the runway for Balmain, Valentino, Givenchy, Hermès, Alexander McQueen, Alaïa, Isabel Marant, and Jean-Paul Gaultier.

In editorials, Veiteberg has appeared in WSJ, Harper's Bazaar, Vogue España, i-D, British Vogue, Vogue Italia, and on the cover of Vogue Japan and Harper's Bazaar España.

Veiteberg was nominated for "Breakout Star of the Year" by models.com, and appears on their list of "Top 50" models.
