= Kim Noorda =

Dutch model

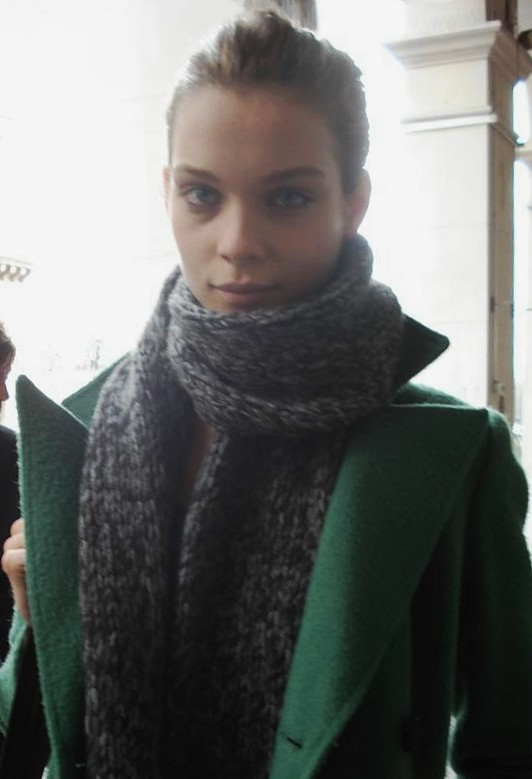
- Noorda in 2007
- Born: April 22, 1986 (age 39); Amsterdam, the Netherlands
- Citizenship: Netherlands
- Occupation: Model
- Years active: 2003 - present
- Modeling information
- Height: 180 cm (5 ft 11 in)
- Hair color: Blonde
- Eye color: Blue
- Agency: Vero Moda

Kim Noorda born in Amsterdam on April 22, 1986 is a Dutch model.

== Career ==
=== Early career ===
Noorda's modeling career began in 2003 after being discovered by talent scout Wilma Wakker. She is represented by modeling agencies DNA Model Management, Viva Models, Why Not Models, and Wilma Wakker and is the face of Bulgari's Omnia Crystalline fragrance.

=== Magazine issues ===
Noorda has been photographed by Peter Lindbergh, and has walked in fashion shows for Chanel, Burberry, Prada, Miu Miu, and Dolce & Gabbana. She has appeared on the covers of Vogue (Brazil and Russia), Vogue Beauty (Japan), Madame Figaro, D, Marie Claire (Italy), Elle (Netherlands), and Avantgarde (Netherlands).

=== Professional campaigns ===
Noorda starred in campaigns for Bottega Veneta, Salvatore Ferragamo, and Emporio Armani. She also appeared in a campaign for Cartier.

In 2010, an interview with Noorda appeared in American Vogue, in which she discussed her ongoing struggle with her weight. That same year, she became the face of the retail chain Vero Moda.
