= Modeling agency =

Company that represents fashion models

A modeling agency is a company that represents fashion models, to work for the fashion industry. These agencies earn their income via commission, usually from the deal they make with the model and/or the head agency.

Top agencies work with high-budget advertising agencies and fashion designers, investing money into developing a model's talent to increase their status within the industry. These top agencies will help train models, get test shoots, layout portfolios, and put together comp cards (composition photo cards), as well as other printed materials models need.

The agencies find work for models by presenting them to designers, photographers, and ad agencies. The agencies are also responsible for booking the jobs, billing for the jobs, and eventually paying the models for their time. By handling the details, an agency allows a model to focus on modeling and not on the business end.

Because modeling is a competitive, fast-moving business that extends beyond the traditional 9 AM to 5 PM business hours, an agency generally conducts business 24 hours a day, to handle emergencies such as cancellations or rush jobs. Most agencies have a service or an operator to handle emergency issues after hours.

== Industry information ==
=== Booking agents versus managers and mother agents ===
A popular and conventional way for models to build their contacts and be booked for gigs is through model management companies or agencies. An agency specializes in finding gigs for models that are signed with them, while managers are there to guide their models and help them start, develop, and establish successful careers, present models to booking agents, and arrange placements for their models. Mother agents/model managers play a key role in the modeling industry. They provide the constant supply of new faces to booking markets from scouting markets. Most models are from countries like Russia, Hungary, the Netherlands, Poland, the Czech Republic, etc. while booking markets are New York, London, Paris, Milan, Tokyo, Shanghai, etc.

=== Contractual agreements ===
Most agencies sign their top talent to exclusive contracts in each market, which vary in length based on the model's industry status and experience. However, because a good agency finds their models work and negotiates top price for their talent, they earn a management commission (between 10% and 20%) from every job they book on a model's behalf. An agency usually bills a client an additional 20% service charge for booking the model, so a typical agency will make between 10 and 40% on each booking of which no more than 20% comes out of the model's pocket. This varies outside the US due to each country's law and taxes. Other contracts offered by modeling agencies are the mother agency contract and a non-exclusive contract. A mother agency tries to sign talent with larger agencies in each international market, while non-exclusive agencies allow models to sign with other agencies (usually outside a certain city radius). Contracts typically last from a year to three years. A mother agency agreement can range from five to ten years.

==== Poaching ====
Poaching is the act of signing a model or agent from another agency while they are still under contract, an act that can be seen as financially detrimental to the agency. Typically, the agency sues the other agency for breach of contract.

=== Mandatory height requirements ===
High fashion modeling agencies contract with a diverse group of models. Nearly without exception (unless a model is young enough to still be growing), agencies require women to be between 5'9 (minimum) and 6'1" and men to be between 5'11" and 6'3" and in fit or reasonable physical condition for all heights.

=== Auditions and open calls ===
Modelling agencies need new faces on a regular basis. The number of models in an agency depends on the demand brought in by its agents and changes throughout the year. To this end, modeling agencies advertise in local phone directories to remain visible.

Each new model-screening process is different from one agency to the next:

- A casting call is where models show up by appointment to be considered for a specific job.
- An open call is a time specified by an agency for any prospective models (or those interested in becoming models) to show up and be considered for future work.
- A go-see is an appointment for a model to meet with a client for consideration for future work. Like an open call, it is not for a specific job, but unlike an open call, the model is being specifically requested or sent.
- A dry call is where models mail unsolicited comp cards to an agency. While this may work with smaller agencies, larger agencies host open calls where men and women can enter the agency and be seen by agents who may or may not be interested.

== Scams ==
In the United States, the Better Business Bureau registers complaints against agencies that conduct dishonest business practices and scams. Scam artists and untrustworthy agencies generally demand long-term contracts up front and use high-pressure tactics to persuade models into committing to high-commission percentages or signing over unnecessary rights.

An example of a modeling scam is when an agency claims to have work, but really what they are doing is trying to sell photoshoots and modeling courses to aspiring models. A legitimate agency should only make profit from agency commissions.

A scam was exposed in 2009, when a Louisville-based male modeling agency, called "Models-Today, LLC", owned by convicted felon Russell Claxon, was exposed as having never obtained any jobs for the models despite fees in the hundreds of dollars. Due to the unusually large number of consumer complaints filed against the business, including solicitation for gay male prostitution, this story was disseminated across the Better Business Bureau national networks and provides information on how to avoid such scams. Due to a lack of regulatory oversight in the United States, modelling agency scams can be easily carried out and sustained. Models-Today's owner began operating a similar company called Active Male Models, LLC in Kentucky.

== See also ==
- Ad agency
- Employment agency
- List of modeling agencies
- Mother agent
- Talent agency
