= List of Vogue España cover models =

This list of Vogue España cover models (1981–1983; 1988–present) is a catalog of cover models who have appeared on the cover of Vogue España, the Spanish edition of American fashion magazine Vogue.

== 1980s ==
=== 1981 ===
Issue	Cover model	Photographer
April	Cyrielle Clair	Albert Watson
Summer	Sophie Habsburg	
September	Nastasia Urbano	Antoni Bernard
December		

=== 1982 ===
Issue	Cover model	Photographer
February (#6)	Priscilla Barnes	
March		
April		Poivre
May	Carmen Tatché	Antoni Bernard
June		
September	Paola Dominguín	Javier Vallhonrat
October		
December		
	Francis Montesinos and models	

=== 1983 ===
Issue	Cover model	Photographer
February	Begoña Cortázar	Alejandro Cabrera
March	Paloma Morales	Antonio Molina
April	Belinda Alonso	Javier Vallhonrat
May		
September		J. C. de Medeiros
November		Sylvia Pokalov

=== 1988 ===
Issue	Cover model	Photographer
April	Cindy Crawford	Eric Boman
May	Talisa Soto	Eric Boman
June	Monica Bellucci	Randolph Graff
July	Carla Bruni	Randolph Graff
August	Joanna Styburska	Horts
September	Yasmin Le Bon	Paco Navarro
October	Susan Minor	Neil Kirk
November	Sonia Resika	Eamonn McCabe
December	Inès de La Fressange	Pamela Hanson

=== 1989 ===
Issue	Cover model	Photographer
January	Enriqueta Domínguez	Marco Monti
February	Francesca Bonicoli	Marco Monti
March	Estelle Lefébure	Eamonn J. McCabe
April	Linda Evangelista	Peter Lindbergh
May	Xandra van Rooijen	Robert Erdmann
June	Emma Sjoberg	Martin Branding
July	Roberta Chirko	Lotar Schmidt
August	Natalie Bloom	Lotar Schmidt
September	Susana Giménez	Giovanni Gastel
October	Sophia Goth	Bettina Rheims
November	Isabella Rosellini	Matthew Rolston
December	Beri Smither	Patrick Demarchelier

== 1990s ==
=== 1990 ===
Issue	Cover model	Photographer
January	Carmen Loderus	Marco Glaviano
February	Gretha Cavazzoni	Giovanni Gastel
March	Tatjana Patitz	Giovanni Gastel
April	Christy Turlington	Patrick Demarchelier
May	Steevie van der Veen	Giovanni Gastel
June	Thérèse Bachy	Marco Glaviano
July	Madonna	Helmut Newton
August	Brenda Schad	Giovanni Gastel
September	Carina Wretman; Daniela Ghione	Patrick Demarchelier
October	Patty Sylvia	Marco Glaviano
November	Joan Bennett	J.R. Durán
December	Daniela Ghione	Giovanni Gastel

=== 1991 ===
Issue	Cover model	Photographer
January	Niki Taylor	Marco Glaviano
February	Yvette Lozano	J.R. Duran
March	Fabienne Terwinghe	Steven Klein
April	Lisa Kaufman	Giovanni Gastel
May	Lesa Sullivan	Attilio Concari
June	Susan Holmes	Sante D'Orazio
July	Lesa Sullivan	Attilio Concari
August	Christy Turlington	Sante D'Orazio
September	Naomi Campbell	Piero Biasion
October	Christy Turlington	Herb Rits
November	Cindy Crawford	Sante D'Orazio
December	Stephanie Seymour	Sante D'Orazio

=== 1992 ===
Issue	Cover model	Photographer
January	Karen Mulder	Ellen Von Unwerth
February	Daniela Peštová	Troy Word
March	Karen Mulder	Piero Biason
April	Heather Stewart-Whyte	Michael Roberts
May	Yasmeen Ghauri	Sante D'Orazio
June	Tyra Banks	Carlo Dalla Chiesa
July	Cindy Crawford	Michel Comte
August	Linda Evangelista	Sante D'Orazio
September	Beckie Brown	André Carrara
October	Claudia Schiffer	Marco Glaviano
November	Ludmila Isaeva	Eamonn J. McCabe
December	Christy Turlington	Roxane Lowit

=== 1993 ===
Issue	Cover model	Photographer
January	Daniela Peštová	Eamonn McCabe
February	Ludmila Isaeva	Marco Glaviano
March	Eva Herzigová	Marco Glaviano
April	Heather Stewart-Whyte	Dominique Issermann
May	Kate Moss	Mark Abrahams
June	Estelle Lefébure	Bettina Rheims
July	Yasmeen Ghauri	Marco Glaviano
August	Stephanie Seymour	Richard Avedon
September	Amber Valletta	Marco Glaviano
October	Annalena Boss	Marco Glaviano
November	Sarah O´hare	Troy Word
December	Patricia Hartmann	André Rau

=== 1994 ===
Issue	Cover model	Photographer
January	Tricia Helfer; Christina Kruse and unknown	Marco Glaviano
February	Nelly Schamey Pakh	Tyen
March	Manon Von Gerkan	Tyen
April	Ivana Stanković	Aldo Fallai
May	Joanna Rhodes	André Rau
June	Claudia Schiffer	Antoine Verglas
July	Sarah Murdoch	Doug Ordway
August	Sarah Murdoch	Doug Ordway
September	Meghan Douglas	Marco Glaviano
October	Vanessa Brown	Hannes Schmid
November	Kim Renneberg	Aldo Fallai
December	Irina Pantaeva	Tyen

=== 1995 ===
Issue	Cover model	Photographer
January	Natalia Semanova	Tyen
February	Tatjana Patitz	Raymond Meier
March	Naomi Campbell	Matthew Rolston
April	Claudia Mason	Matthew Rolston
May	Sarah Murdoch	Eamonn McCabe
June	Julie Anderson	Serge Barbeau
July	Cecilia Chancellor	Philip Newton
August	Michelle Behennah	Serge Barbeau
September	Kate Moss	Kelly Klein
October	Monica Bellucci	Jose Manuel Ferrater
November	Vanessa Lorenzo	Jose Manuel Ferrater
December	Isabel Preysler	Pascal Chevallier

=== 1996 ===
Issue	Cover model	Photographer
January	Inés Sastre	Bruce Weber
February	Kate Moss	Kelly Klein
March	Michelle Behennah	Christophe Kutner
April	Filippa von Stackelberg	Kelly Klein
May	Eva Herzigová	Sante D'Orazio
June	Laura Ponte	Kelly Klein
July	Laura Ponte	Mikael Jansson
August	Tasha Tilberg	Kelly Klein
September	Vanessa Lorenzo	Raymond Meier
October	Meghan Douglas	Kelly Klein
November	Tua Fock	Kelly Klein
December	Naomi Campbell	Christophe Kutner

=== 1997 ===
Issue	Cover model	Photographer
January	Madonna	Steven Meisel
February	Amit Machtinger	Peggy Sirota
March	Heather Stohler	Kelly Klein
April	Molly Sims	Judson Baker
May	Tanga Moreau	Thomas Schenk
June	Beri Smither	Cristopher Griffith
July	Diana, Princess of Wales	Mario Testino
August	Elizabeth Hurley	Sante D'Orazio
September	Naomi Campbell	Michelangelo Di Battista
October	Esther Cañadas	Michelangelo Di Battista
November	Georgina Grenville	Regan Cameron
December	Kylie Bax	Michelangelo Di Battista

=== 1998 ===
Issue	Cover model	Photographer
January	Karen Elson	Michelangelo Di Battista
February	Kiara Kabukuru	Michelangelo Di Battista
March	Chandra North	Thomas Schenk
April	Carolyn Murphy	Michelangelo Di Battista
May	Kylie Bax	Thomas Schenk
June	Astrid Muñoz	Juan Gatti
July	Trish Goff	Michelangelo Di Battista
August	Bridget Hall	Michelangelo Di Battista
September	Inés Sastre	Robin Derrick
October	Esther Cañadas	Michelangelo Di Battista
November	Penélope Cruz	Juan Gatti
December	Małgosia Bela	Michelangelo Di Battista

=== 1999 ===
Issue	Cover model	Photographer
January	Kirsty Hume	Michelangelo Di Battista
February	Esther Cañadas; Mark Vanderloo	Mikael Jansson
March	Haylynn Cohen	Michelangelo Di Battista
April	Fernanda Tavares	Michelangelo Di Battista
May	Camilla Rutherford	Michelangelo Di Battista
June	Georgina Cooper	Michelangelo Di Battista
July	Laetitia Casta	André Rau
August	Rachel Roberts	Anne Menke
September	Fernanda Tavares	André Rau
October	Prince; Mayte Garcia	André Rau
November	Tamara Brooks	André Rau
December	Courtney Herron	André Rau

== 2000s ==
=== 2000 ===
Issue	Cover model	Photographer
January	Rosario Nadal	André Rau
February	Penélope Cruz	Juan Gatte
March	Mariah Carey	André Rau
April	Gabriela Cubert; Carla Collado; Tamara Brooks	André Rau
May	Gisele Bündchen	Mario Testino
June	Carla Collado	André Rau
July	Frankie Rayder	Mario Testino
August	Gabriela Cubert	André Rau
September	Natalia Semanova	André Rau
October	Caroline Ribeiro	André Rau
November	Vanessa Greca	Neil Kirk
December	Catherine Hurley	Kim Knott

=== 2001 ===
Issue	Cover model	Photographer
January	Camilla Thorsson; Jennifer Ohlsson; Angie Schmidt Winter Lunde; Courtney Herron	André Rau
February	Angie Schmidt	André Rau
March	Sharon van der Knaap	André Rau
April	Sharon van der Knaap	André Rau
May	Penélope Cruz	Herb Ritts
June	Ashley Wood	Oberto Gili
July	Ashley Wood	Oberto Gili
August	Karolína Kurková	Russell James
September	Carmen Maria Hillestad	Christian Witkin
October	Madeleine Hjort	André Rau
November	Michelle Alves; Raica Oliveira; Luciana Marinissen; Ana Beatriz Barros	Nacho Pinedo
December	Isabeli Fontana	Nacho Pinedo

=== 2002 ===
Issue	Cover model	Photographer
January	Ana Cláudia Michels	Nacho Piñedo
February	Liliana Domínguez	Sarah Silver
March	Penélope Cruz	Nacho Piñedo
April	Christy Turlington	Regan Cameron
May	Carmen Kass	Mario Testino
June	Mini Andén	Jordan Donner
July	Caroline Ribeiro	Jordan Donner
August	Claudia Schiffer	Enrique Badulescu
September	Filippa Hamilton	Walter Chin
October	Maja Latinović	Donna Trope
November	Amanda Moore	Arthur Elgort
December	Helena Christensen	Ellen von Unwerth

=== 2003 ===
Issue	Cover model	Photographer
January	Elizabeth Hurley	Ellen von Unwerth
February	Fernanda Tavares	Enrique Badulescu
March	Jessica Miller	Enrique Badulescu
April	Heidi Klum	Ruvén Afanador
May	Vivien Solari	Todd Barry
June	Filippa Hamilton	Regan Cameron
July	Veronica Blume	Nico Bustos
August	Liya Kebede	Joshua Jordan
September	Stephanie Seymour	Ruvén Afanador
October	Emmanuelle Seigner	Nicolas Moore
November	Karolína Kurková	Alex Cayley
December	Michelle Alves	Thomas Nützl

=== 2004 ===
Issue	Cover model	Photographer
January	Frankie Rayder	Joshua Jordan
February	Victoria Beckham	Richard Bush
March	Penélope Cruz	Ellen von Unwerth
April	Eva Herzigová	Melvin Sokolsky
May	Angela Lindvall	Nico Bustos
June	Naomi Campbell	Nico Bustos
July	Isabeli Fontana	Andre Schiliro
August	Susan Eldridge	Patric Shaw
September	Heather Marks	Regan Cameron
October	Jacquetta Wheeler	Juan Gatti
November	Rianne ten Haken	Nico Bustos
December	Cindy Crawford	Regan Cameron

=== 2005 ===
Issue	Cover model	Photographer
January	Daniela Cicarelli & Ronaldo	Hamish Brown
February	Liya Kebede	Nico Bustos
March	Marina Pérez	Nico Bustos
April	Eugenia Martínez de Irujo	Christophe Kutner
May	Eugenia Volodina	Nico Bustos
June	Monica Bellucci	Ellen von Unwerth
July	Erin Wasson	Regan Cameron
August	Filippa Hamilton	Nico Bustos
September	Daria Werbowy	Nicolas Moore
October	Diana Dondoe	Nico Bustos
November	Laetitia Casta	Satoshi Saïkusa
December	Claudia Schiffer	Nico Bustos

=== 2006 ===
Issue	Cover model	Photographer
January	Carmen Kass	Nicolas Moore
February	Penélope Cruz	Juan Gatti
March	Virginie Ledoyen	Karl Lagerfeld
April	Valentina Zelyaeva	Regan Cameron
May	Lauren Hutton	Nicolas Moore
June	Milla Jovovich	Tesh
July	Marija Vujović	Fabio Chizzola
August	Marina Pérez	Nico Bustos
September	Missy Rayder	Tesh
October	Karolína Kurková	Patrick Demarchelier
November	Carmen Kass	Satoshi Saïkusa
December	Élise Crombez	Satoshi Saïkusa

=== 2007 ===
Issue	Cover model	Photographer
January	Paz Vega	Bryan Adams
February	Jeísa Chiminazzo	Satoshi Saïkusa
March	Gwyneth Paltrow	Regan Cameron
April	Liya Kebede	Nicolas Moore
May	Heather Marks	Helena Christensen
June	Valentina Zelyaeva	Patric Shaw
July	Elena Baguci	Regan Cameron
August	Flávia de Oliveira	Nico Bustos
September	Caroline Trentini	Regan Cameron
October	Hilary Rhoda	Tesh
November	Caroline Trentini	Regan Cameron
December	Bianca Balti	Philippe Cometti

=== 2008 ===
Issue	Cover model	Photographer
January	Jade Jagger	Nico Bustos
February	Milana Keller	Philippe Cometti
March	Doutzen Kroes	Patrick Demarchelier
April	Missy Rayder	Regan Cameron
May	Kate Moss	Nick Knight
June	Valentina Zelyaeva	Fabio Chizzola
July	Claudia Schiffer	Nico Bustos
August	Angela Lindvall	Alex Cayley
September	Gisele Bündchen	Patrick Demarchelier
October	Małgosia Bela	David Vasiljevic
November	Julia Stegner	Fabio Chizzola
December	Monica Bellucci	Alix Malka

=== 2009 ===
Issue	Cover model	Photographer
January	Coco Rocha	Arthur Elgort
February	Frankie Rayder	Nicolas Moore
March	Missy Rayder	David Vasiljevic
April	Penélope Cruz	Patrick Demarchelier
May	Carmen Kass	Paola Kudacki
June	Doutzen Kroes	Alex Cayley
July	Cindy Crawford	Alix Malka
August	Lindsay Lohan	Alix Malka
September	Isabeli Fontana	David Vasiljevic
October	Sharon Stone	Alix Malka
November	Julia Stegner	Paola Kudacki
December	Iris Strubegger	Mark Pillai

== 2010s ==
=== 2010 ===
Issue	Cover model	Photographer
January	Aline Weber	Alex Cayley
February	Kylie Minogue	Vincent Peters
March	Anja Rubik	Patrick Demarchelier
April	Edita Vilkevičiūtė	David Vasiljevic
May	Raquel Zimmermann	Alex Cayley
June	Adriana Lima	Vincent Peters
July	Natasha Poly	Patrick Demarchelier
August	Anna Selezneva	Maciek Kobielski
September	Miranda Kerr	Tom Munro
October	Elena Melnik	Victor Demarchelier
November	Caroline Trentini; Iselin Steiro; Toni Garrn; Kasia Struss; Anne Vyalitsyna	Victor Demarchelier
December	Penélope Cruz	Peter Lindbergh

=== 2011 ===
Issue	Cover model	Photographer
January	Karolína Kurková	Tom Munro
February	Constance Jablonski	Alex Cayley
March	Anja Rubik	Alexi Lubomirski
April	Toni Garrn	Alexi Lubomirski
May	Isabeli Fontana	Greg Kadel
June	Erin Wasson	Alexi Lubomirski
July	Małgosia Bela	Greg Kadel
August	Katie Holmes	Tom Munro
September	Eva Herzigová; Helena Christensen; Claudia Schiffer	Tom Munro
October	Toni Garrn & Clive Owen	Alexi Lubomirski
November	Natasha Poly	Inez & Vinoodh
December	Dree Hemingway	Bruce Weber

=== 2012 ===
Issue	Cover model	Photographer
January	Maryna Linchuk	Vincent Peters
February	Isabeli Fontana	Alexi Lubomirski
March	Edita Vilkevičiūtė	Greg Kadel
April	Laetitia Casta	Miguel Reveriego
May	Lily Donaldson	Alexi Lubomirski
June	Toni Garrn	Tom Munro
July	Karolína Kurková	Miguel Reveriego
August	Małgosia Bela	Greg Kadel
September	Maryna Linchuk	Maciek Kobielski
October	Bianca Balti	Giampaolo Sgura
November	Penélope Cruz	Tom Munro
December	Kate Moss	Mario Testino

=== 2013 ===
Issue	Cover model	Photographer
January	Edita Vilkevičiūtė	Patrick Demarchelier
February	Karlie Kloss	Alexi Lubomirski
March	Rosie Huntington-Whiteley	Michelangelo Di Battista
April	Candice Swanepoel	Mariano Vivanco
May	Aymeline Valade	Miguel Reveriego
June	Anja Rubik	Giampaolo Sgura
July	Daria Werbowy	Patrick Demarchelier
August	Karmen Pedaru	Greg Kadel
September	Doutzen Kroes	Tom Munro
October	Andreea Diaconu	Mariano Vivanco
November	Irina Shayk	Giampaolo Sgura
December	Joan Smalls	Karl Lagerfeld

=== 2014 ===
Issue	Cover model	Photographer
January	Louise Parker	Jason Kibbler
February	Kendra Spears	Giampaolo Sgura
March	Arizona Muse	Cüneyt Akeroğlu
April	Behati Prinsloo	Greg Kadel
May	Adriana Lima	Miguel Reveriego
June	Irina Shayk & Cristiano Ronaldo	Mario Testino
July	Constance Jablonski	Patrick Demarchelier
August	Blanca Suárez	Giampaolo Sgura
September	Irina Shayk	Paola Kudacki
October	Emily DiDonato	Miguel Reveriego
November	Alessandra Ambrosio; Edita Vilkevičiūtė; Kati Nescher	Alexi Lubomirski
December	Vanessa Axente	Patrick Demarchelier

=== 2015 ===
Issue	Cover model	Photographer
January	Sigrid Agren	Cüneyt Akeroğlu
February	Blanca Padilla	Matt Irwin
March	Gigi Hadid	Benny Horne
April	Chiara Ferragni	Nico Bustos
May	Binx Walton	Nico Bustos
June	Cameron Russell	Miguel Reveriego
July	Caroline Trentini	Paola Kudacki
August	Kim Kardashian	Theo Wenner
September	Penélope Cruz	Nico Bustos
October	Andreea Diaconu	Benny Horne
November	Catherine McNeil	Ezra Petronio
December	Natalia Vodianova	Nico Bustos

=== 2016 ===
Issue	Cover model	Photographer
January	Lily Aldridge	Ezra Petronio
February	Suvi Koponen	Dan Martensen
March	Aya Jones	Nico Bustos
April	Małgosia Bela	Miguel Reveriego
May	Martha Hunt; Elsa Hosk; Romee Strijd; Stella Maxwell; Jasmine Tookes; Sara Sampaio; Taylor Hill	David Bellemere
June	Edita Vilkevičiūtė	Benny Horne
July	Natasha Poly	Nico Bustos
August	Crista Cober; Lucky Blue Smith; Anja Rubik	Nico Bustos
September	Andreea Diaconu	Ezra Petronio
October	Kendall Jenner	Miguel Reveriego
November	Doutzen Kroes	Benny Horne
December	Penélope Cruz	Mario Testino

=== 2017 ===
Issue	Cover model	Photographer
January	Josephine Skriver	Patrick Demarchelier
February	Emily Ratajkowski	Miguel Reveriego
March	Andreea Diaconu	Miguel Reveriego
April	Adwoa Aboah & Cameron Russell	Emma Summerton
May	Grace Elizabeth	Richard Burbridge
June	Jessica Chastain	Mario Sorrenti
July	Imaan Hammam	Boo George
August	Irina Shayk	Mario Testino
September	Bella Hadid	Patrick Demarchelier
October	Dakota Johnson	Emma Summerton
November	Raquel Zimmermann	Christian MacDonald
December	Luna Bijl	Nathaniel Goldberg

=== 2018 ===
Issue	Cover model	Photographer
January	Taylor Hill	Bjorn Iooss
February	Victoria Beckham	Boo George
March	Cameron Russell	Inez & Vinoodh
April	Luna Bijl; Yasmin Wijnaldum; Birgit Kos; Blanca Padilla	Emma Summerton
May	Lara Stone	Bjorn Iooss
June	Karlie Kloss	Emma Summerton
July	Kylie Minogue	Boo George
August	Faretta	Camilla Åkrans
September	Irina Shayk	Giampaolo Sgura
October	Cindy Crawford	Sebastian Faena
November	Lupita Nyong'o	Luigi & Iango
December	Alicia Vikander	Emma Summerton

=== 2019 ===
Issue	Cover model	Photographer
January	Africa Peñalver	Camila Falquez
February	Yasmin Wijnaldum	Giampaolo Sgura
March	Birgit Kos	Txema Yeste
April	Penélope Cruz	Peter Lindbergh; Luigi & Iango
May	Emilia Clarke	Thomas Whiteside
June	Bella Hadid	Zoey Grossman
July	Rosalía	Peter Lindbergh
August	Adriana Lima & Irina Shayk	Luigi & Iango
September	Vittoria Ceretti	Giampaolo Sgura
October	Dua Lipa	Luigi & Iango
November	Birgit Kos	Camilla Åkrans
December	Karlie Kloss	Txema Yeste

== 2020s ==
=== 2020 ===
Issue	Cover model	Photographer
January	Edie Campbell	Sølve Sundsbø
February	Miriam Sánchez, Marina Pérez, Africa Peñalver & Inés Sastre	Txema Yeste
March	Hailey Bieber	Emma Summerton
April	Ana de Armas	Thomas Whiteside
May	Illustration	Ignasi Monreal (Illustrator)
June	Laura Dern	Alexi Lubomirski
July	Naomi Campbell	Nadine Ijewere
August	Miriam Sánchez	Miguel Reveriego
September	Dora Postigo	Ezra Petronio
October	Esther Cañadas	Nico Bustos
November	Indya Moore	Thomas Whiteside
December	Amber Valletta	Txema Yeste

=== 2021 ===
Issue	Cover Model	Photographer
January	Penelope Cruz	Nico Bustos
Febrero	Jill Kortleve	Giampaolo Sgura
March	Bella Hadid	Micaiah Carter
April	Jodie Comer	Emma Summerton
May	Paloma Elsesser	Alique
June	Blanca Padilla	Miguel Reveriego
July	Edita Vilkeviciute	Txema Yeste
August	Kendall Jenner	Micaiah Carter
September	Úrsula Corberó	Txema Yeste
October	Anya Taylor-Joy	Camila Falquez
November	Nyarach Ayuel	Rasharn Agyemang
December	Nathy Peluso	Emma Summerton

=== 2022 ===
Issue	Cover model	Photographer
January	Africa Garcia	Coco Capitan
February	Milena Smit	Dan Beleiu
March	Uma Thurman	Tess Ayano
April	Paloma Elsesser	Nadine Ljewere
May	Angela Molina	Camilla Falquez
June	Mica Arganaraz	Casper Kofi
July	Karlie Kloss	Lachlan Bailey
August	Ariana DeBose	Mert and Marcus
September	Penélope Cruz	Ned Rogers
October	Imaan Hammam	Nadine Ijawere
November	Rosalía	Harley Weir
December	Jill Kortleve	David Luraschi

=== 2023 ===
Issue	Coved Model	Photographer
January	Anok Yai	Renell Medrano
February	Irina Shayk	Elizaveta Porodina
March	Devyn Garcia	Laura Jane Coulson
April	Emma Corrin	Will Scarborough
May	Emily Ratajkowski	Brett Lloyd
June	Nora Attal	Oliver Hadlee Pearch
July	Grace Elizabeth	Elizaveta Porodina
August	Sora Choi	Anthony Seklaoui
September	Úrsula Corberó	Dan Martensen
October	Amber Valletta	Alex Webb
November	Rosalía	Katie Burnett
December	Sara Caballero	Coco Capitán

=== 2024 ===
Issue	Coved Model	Photographer
January	Karolina Spakowski	Lachlan Bailey
February	Penélope Cruz	Ned Rogers
March	Lila Moss	Elizaveta Porodina
April	Bad Gyal	Campbell Addy
May	Amelia Gray	Brett Lloyd
June	Jill Kortleve	Ines Lorenzo
July	Karol G	Micaiah Carter
August	Lulu Tenney	Oliver Hadlee Pearch
September	Julianne Moore, Tilda Swinton	Oliver Hadlee Pearch
October	Ester Expósito	Felicity Ingram
November	Adriana Lima	Dan Jackson
December	Sara Caballero, Rejoice Chuol, Colin Jones, Diane Chiu	Campbell Addy

=== 2025 ===
Issue	Coved Model	Photographer
January	Amaia Romero	David Gomez-Maestre
February	Iris Law	Julia Noni
March	Anya Taylor-Joy	Sebastián Faena
April	Lila Moss	David Gomez-Maestre
May	Úrsula Corberó	Elizaveta Porodina
June	Kaia Gerber	Amy Troost
July	Aitana	Pablo Sáez
August	Bibi Breslin	Julia Noni
September	Amelia Gray	Sean + Seng
October	Chloë Sevigny	Michael Bailey-Gates
November	Gracie Abrams	Daniel Jackson
December		Pablo Zamora

=== 2026 ===
Issue	Cover Model	Photographer
January	Judeline	Kate Bellm
February	Lulu Tenney	Sebastián Faena
March	Milena Smit, Victoria Luengo, Aitana Sánchez-Gijón, Pedro Almodóvar, Bárbara Lennie	Sebastián Faena
April	Elle Fanning	Clara Balzary
May	Nicole Wallace	David Gomez Maestre
June	Ida Heiner	Daniel Jackson
July	Angelina Kendall	Sean+Seng
August	Lila Moss	Sebastián Faena
September	Penélope Cruz	Sean+Seng
October	Daisy Edgar-Jones	Agnes Lloyd-Platt
November	Maya Hawke	Daniel Jackson
December	Laura Ponte	Coco Capitán
December	Ana Rujas	Coco Capitán
December	Carolina Yuste	Coco Capitán

== See also ==
- List of L'Officiel España cover models
- List of Harper's Bazaar España cover models
