= Blanca Padilla =

Spanish model (born 1995)

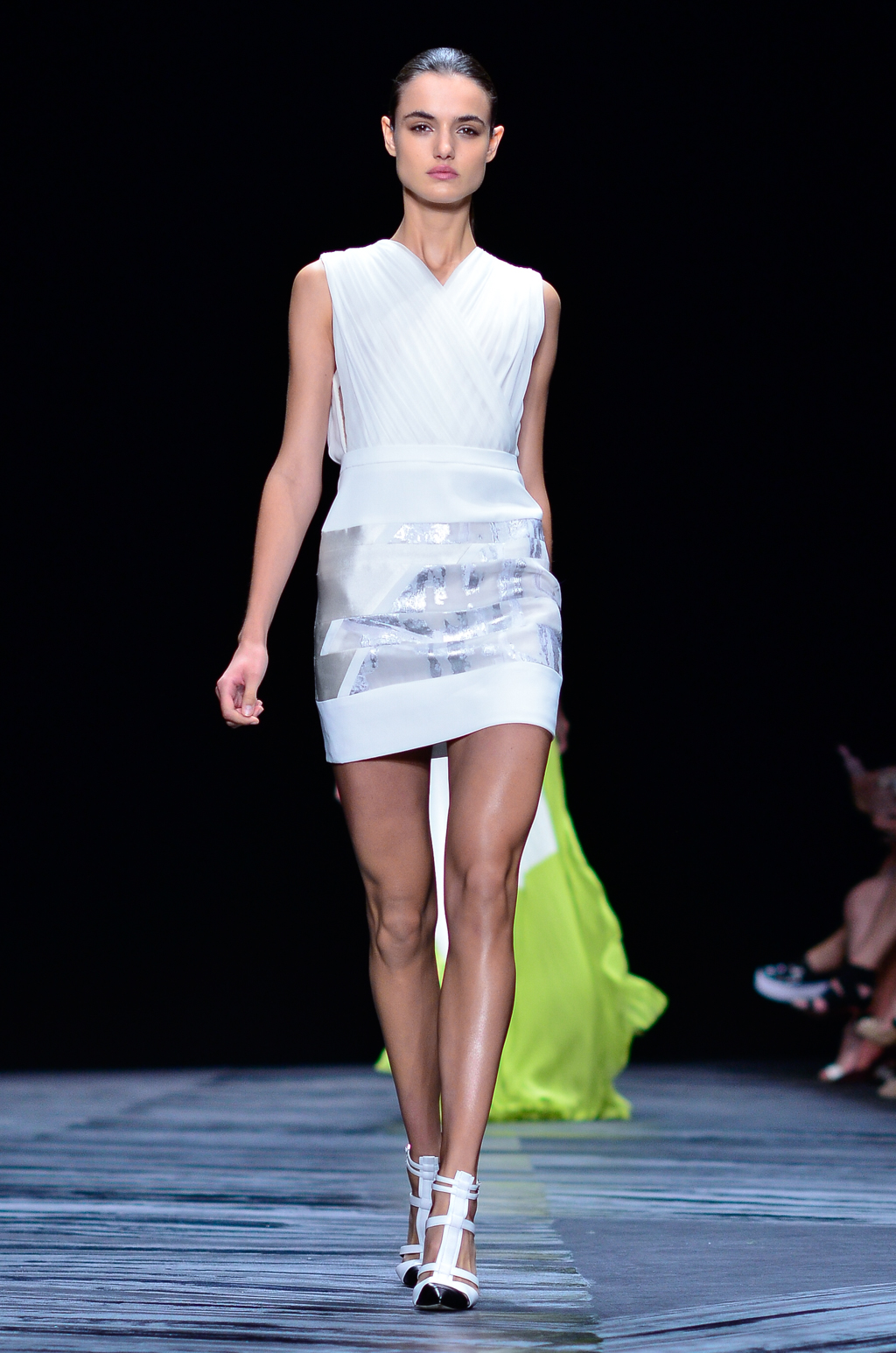
- Blanca Padilla walking the runway for J. Mendel in 2015
- Born: 7 January 1995 (age 31); Collado Villalba, Madrid, Spain
- Occupation: Model
- Modeling information
- Height: 1.80 m (5 ft 11 in)
- Hair color: Brown
- Eye color: Brown
- Agency: Next Management (worldwide)

Blanca Padilla (born 7 January 1995) is a Spanish model who has worked for brands including Givenchy and Victoria's Secret. She has been described as one of the most well-known Spanish models on the international stage. Padilla is represented by Next Management; they also represent Abby Champion, Selena Forrest, Grace Hartzel, Lineisy Montero, Karmen Pedaru, and Binx Walton.

== Career ==
Padilla began modelling after an agent spotted her on the subway in Madrid when she was a student at the ESIC Business & Marketing School. As of 2014, she is signed to NEXT Model Management.

In February 2014, she was named "Female Model of the Year" at the 59th edition of the Mercedes-Benz Madrid Fashion Week for her elegance. After covering Telva twice and Yo Dona as well as appearing in an editorial for CYL Magazine, she walked the 2014 edition of the Victoria's Secret Fashion Show, being the fourth Spanish model to do so after Esther Cañadas, Eugenia Silva and Clara Alonso. She also opened three fashion shows during fashion week.

In 2015, she was featured in campaigns for Dolce & Gabbana and Suiteblanco. She also made her Vogue cover debut in the February issue of Vogue España which was the first time in nine years that a Spanish model covered Vogue Spain, the last one being Marina Perez. and Mujer Hoy.

In 2017, Padilla was awarded Glamour's Best International Model Award. Padilla has extensive runway experience, walking for many brands, including: Armani, Chanel, Dior, Dolce & Gabbana, Givenchy, and Versace. She is also a seasoned editorial model, having appeared in various international versions of Elle, Harper's Bazaar, and Vogue.

== Personal life ==
In October 2022, Padilla got engaged to her partner, Alejandro García, during a Malibu sunset. In May 2024, Padilla and García got married at a Menorcan farmhouse and boutique hotel.

In a 2015 Spanish television interview, Padilla shared that she grew up with a "complex of being too thin" and that she had been trying to keep weight on all her life. Conversely, she was told during a casting call that she was too fat. In an October 2021 interview, Padilla shared that she has struggled with anxiety and depression throughout her life.
