= List of Vogue Türkiye cover models =

This list of Vogue Türkiye cover models (2010–present) is a catalog of cover models who have appeared on the cover of Vogue Türkiye, the Turkish edition of American fashion magazine Vogue.

== 2010s ==
=== 2010 ===
Issue	Cover model	Photographer
March	Jessica Stam	Patrick Demarchelier
April	Julia Hafström	Boo George
May	Élise Crombez	Chad Pitman
June	Leigh Lezark	Nihat Odabaşı
July	Marike Le Roux	Thomas Schenk
August	Victoria Beckham	Ellen von Unwerth
September	Karlie Kloss	Max Vadukul
October	Hilary Rhoda & Julia Stegner	Cüneyt Akeroğlu
November	Gwen Loos	Mariano Vivanco
December	Maryna Linchuk	Ellen von Unwerth

=== 2011 ===
Issue	Cover model	Photographer
January	Aymeline Valade	David Dunan
February	Paris Hilton	Terry Richardson
March	Gisele Bündchen	Mert & Marcus
April	Małgosia Bela	Cüneyt Akeroğlu
May	Liv Tyler	Patrick Demarchelier
June	Anna Jagodzińska	Mariano Vivanco
July	Dree Hemingway & Jon Kortajarena	Sebastian Faena
August	Milly Simmonds; Eglė Jezepčikaitė; Yana Sotnikova	Cüneyt Akeroğlu
September	Natalia Vodianova	Cüneyt Akeroğlu
October	Edita Vilkevičiūtė	Emma Summerton
November	Isabeli Fontana	Sebastian Faena
December	Jacquelyn Jablonski	Matt Irwin

=== 2012 ===
Issue	Cover model	Photographer
January	Elsa Sylvan	KT Auleta
February	Karolína Kurková	Alexei Hay
March	Angelina Jolie	Mert & Marcus
April	Lara Stone	Cüneyt Akeroğlu
May	Aline Weber	David Vasiljevic
June	Constance Jablonski	KT Auleta
July	Carola Remer	Laurence Passera
August	Miranda Kerr	Sofia Sanchez & Mauro Mongiello
September	Natasha Poly	Cüneyt Akeroğlu
October	Laetitia Casta	Sean & Seng
November		
December	Joan Smalls	Cüneyt Akeroğlu

=== 2013 ===
Issue	Cover model	Photographer
January	Poppy Delevingne	Alvaro Beamud Cortés
February	Catherine McNeil	Miguel Reveriego
March	Patricia van der Vliet	Sofia Sanchez & Mauro Mongiello
April	Anja Rubik	Cüneyt Akeroğlu
May	Milla Jovovich	Sebastian Faena
June	Karlie Kloss	Miguel Reveriego
July	Bette Franke	KT Auleta
August	Julia Restoin Roitfeld	Sebastian Faena
September	Toni Garrn	Cedric Buchet
October	Mariacarla Boscono	Cüneyt Akeroğlu
November	Lou Doillon	Serge Leblon
December	Karmen Pedaru	Cüneyt Akeroğlu

=== 2014 ===
Issue	Cover model	Photographer
January	Emily DiDonato	Terry Tsiolis
February	Arizona Muse	Sean & Seng
March	Doutzen Kroes	Cüneyt Akeroğlu
April	Cameron Russell	Cüneyt Akeroğlu
May	Adriana Lima	Koray Birand
June	Magdalena Frackowiak	David Bellemere
July	Jeneil Williams; Kätlin Aas; Devon Windsor	Jem Mitchell
August	Rosie Huntington-Whiteley	Horst Diekgerdes
September	Crista Cober	Cüneyt Akeroğlu
October	Natasha Poly	Cüneyt Akeroğlu
November	Naomi Campbell; Eva Herzigová; Claudia Schiffer	Cüneyt Akeroğlu
December	Lily Donaldson	David Slijper

=== 2015 ===
Issue	Cover model	Photographer
January	Freja Beha Erichsen	Cass Bird
February	Suki Waterhouse	Tom Craig
March	Alessandra Ambrosio; Behati Prinsloo; Fei Fei Sun; Jessica Stam; Jourdan Dunn	Cüneyt Akeroğlu
April	Catherine McNeil	David Slijper
May	Sam Rollinson	Sean & Seng
June	Karolin Wolter	Miguel Reveriego
July	Lily Aldridge	David Bellemere
August	Lindsey Wixson	Richard Burbridge
September	Joséphine Le Tutour & Alexandra Elizabeth Ljadov	Liz Collins
October	Vivien Solari	Sean & Seng
November	Lana Del Rey	Liz Collins
December	Nastya Sten & Valery Kaufman	David Slijper

=== 2016 ===
Issue	Cover model	Photographer
January	Angel Rutledge	Tom Munro
February	Irina Shayk	Norman Jean Roy
March	Julia van Os	Liz Collins
April	Julie Hoomans	Miguel Reveriego
May	Bella Hadid	Sebastian Faena
June	Andreea Diaconu	Dan Martensen
July	Sophia Ahrens	Liz Collins
August	Chiara Ferragni	Miguel Reveriego
September	Camila Morrone	Sebastian Faena
October	Lara Stone	Liz Collins
November	Kendall Jenner	Russell James
December	Lineisy Montero	Katja Rahlwes

=== 2017 ===
Issue	Cover model	Photographer
January	Estella Boersma	Tom Craig
February	Ruth Bell	Miguel Reveriego
March	Stella Maxwell	Miguel Reveriego
April	Jordan Barrett & Lexi Boling	Sebastian Faena
May	Grace Hartzel	Katja Rahlwes
June	Sara Sampaio	Liz Collins
July	Vanessa Moody	Liz Collins
August	Julia van Os	Sofia Sanchez & Mauro Mongiello
September	Charlee Fraser; Julia Hafström; McKenna Hellam	Benny Horne
October	Natasha Poly	Anuschka Blommers & Niels Schumm
November	Emily DiDonato	Miguel Reveriego
December	Georgia May Jagger	Liz Collins

=== 2018 ===
Issue	Cover model	Photographer
January	Vivien Solari	Tom Craig
February	Dilone & Romee Strijd	Miguel Reveriego
March	Valentine Rontez & Hailey Bieber (née Baldwin)	Liz Collins
April	Sasha Pivovarova	Liz Collins
May	Dua Lipa	Benjamin Lennox
June	Mert Alas & Kendall Jenner	Marcus Piggott
July	Cindy Crawford	Miguel Reveriego
August	Hilal Ata; Günce Gözütok; Ayşegül Demirhan	Emre Guven
September	Grace Hartzel	Emre Guven
October	Irina Shayk	Cüneyt Akeroğlu
November	Grace Elizabeth	An Le
December-January 2019	Taylor Hill	Miguel Reveriego

=== 2019 ===
Issue	Cover model	Photographer
February	Candice Swanepoel	Zoey Grossman
March	Alexandra Micu	Marcin Kempski
April	Brigette Lundy-Paine	An Le
May	Ansley Gulielmi	Wai Lin Tse
June-July	Giedrė Dukauskaitė	Joachim Mueller-Ruchholtz
August	Lara Stone	Emre Güven
September	Özge Bilici	Patrick Bienert
October	Meghan Roche	Agnes Lloyd-Platt
November	Karlie Kloss	An Le
December-January 2020	Birgit Kos	Agnes Lloyd-Platt

== 2020s ==
=== 2020 ===
Issue	Cover model	Photographer
Summer	Steffi Cook - Taja Feistner	Pauline Suzor - Alexander Saladrigas
September	Hana Jiříčková	Cihan Öncü
October	Luna Bijl	Emre Güven
November	Jourdan Dunn	Cüneyt Akeroğlu
December-January 2021	Anna de Rijk	Tuğberk Acar

=== 2021 ===
Issue	Cover model	Photographer
February	Simona Kust	Marcin Kempski
March	Marte Mei van Haaster	Dan Beleiu
April	Hannah Motler	Tuğberk Acar
May	Olivia Vinten	Luca Campri
June-July	Alex Riviėre	Cihan Öncü
August	Anna Clevland	Santi de Hita
September	Giedre Dukauskaite	Yulia Gorbachenko
October	Bente Oort	Tuğberk Acar
November	Grace Valentine	Luca Campri
December - January 2022	Vilma Sjoberg	Ben Parks

=== 2022 ===
Issue	Cover model	Photographer
February	Penelope Ternes	Emre Guven
March	Mila van Eeten Barbara Palvin	Thomas Cooksey Eva Vik
April	Esin Bicak	Yulia Gorbanchenko
May	Nour Arida	
June/July	Britt Oosten	Ben Parks
August	Zendaya	Elizaveta Porodina
September	Georgia Palmer	Tugberk Acar
October	Deva Cassel	Arseny Jabiev
November	Nicole Peltz-Beckham	
December/January	Halsey	Agata Serge

=== 2023 ===
Issue	Cover model	Photographer
February	Louise de Chevigny Elsa Hosk	Tugberk Acar George Liveratos
March	Abby Champion	Yulia Gorbanchenko
April	Maike Inga	Emre Guven
May	Alyah Peterson	Arseny Jabiev
June	Louise Robert	Emre Unal
July/August	Nora Attal	Tugberk Acar
September	Luna Bijl	Arseny Jabiev
October	Taylor Hill	Max Papendieck
November	Kris Grikaite	Sofia Malamute
December/January 2024	Constance Jablonski	Branislav Šimončík

=== 2024 ===
Issue	Cover model	Photographer
February	Rosie Huntington-Whiteley	Emre Ünal
March	Beauïse Genç	Emre Ünal
April	Lila Moss	Yulia Gorbachenko
May	Stella Maxwell	Emre Ünal
June	Hana Jirickova	Emre Guven
July/August	Anja Rubik	Chris Colls
September	Adele Aldighieri	James Robjant
October	Lulu Wood	Can Sever
November	Camille Chifflot	Emre Ünal
December/January 2025	Aivita Muze	Jordan Koers

=== 2025 ===
Issue	Cover model	Photographer
February	Quinn Mora	Chris Colls
March	Nigina Sharipova	Thomas Cooksey
April	Emily Ratajkowski	Cass Bird
May	Adria Arjona	David Roemer
May	Emma Chamberlain	Justin Campbell
May	Nara Smith	Adam Franzino
June	Abby Champion	Rocio Ramos
July/August	Olivia Petronella Palermo	Jorin Koers
September	Yasmin Wijnaldum	Willy Lukaitis
October	Nora Svenson	Brendan Freeman
November	Vialina Lemann	Peter Ash Lee
November	Freya Nutter	Tuğberk Acar
November	Maria Klaumann	Rocio Ramos
December/January 2026	Mariam de Vizelle	Anna Daki

=== 2026 ===
Issue	Cover model	Photographer
February	Vika Evseeva	Ethan Hart
February	Kristine Lindseth	Arseny Jabiev
March	Peggy Gou	Hong Janghyun
April	Grace Elizabeth	Anna Daki
May	Paula Engbert	Peter Ash Lee
June	Greta Hofer	Giuseppe Triscari
July/August	Bonnie Panasenko	Anna Daki
September	Maya Vozhdaeva	Tuğberk Acar
October	Bess van Noord	Agata Serge
November	Adriana Lima	Yulia Gorbachenko
