= Africa Peñalver =

Spanish fashion model

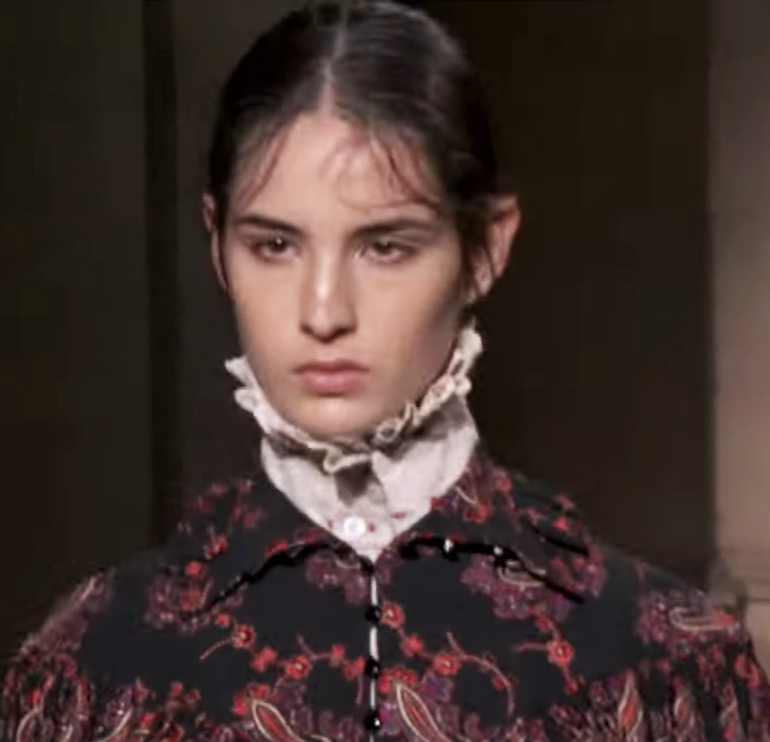
- Peñalver in 2020
- Born: África Peñalver Roland; 15 February 2000 (age 25); Valencia, Spain
- Modeling information
- Height: 5 ft 10.5 in (179 cm)
- Hair color: Dark brown
- Eye color: Brown
- Agency: The Society Management (New York); Elite Model Management (Barcelona, Copenhagen, London, Madrid, Milan, and Paris)

África Peñalver Roland is a Spanish model. Her clients include: Dolce & Gabbana, Ralph Lauren, and Versace. She has also featured in the Spanish and UK versions of Harper's Bazaar and various international versions of Vogue.

Models.com have described Peñalver as a "blue ribbon beauty," while also describing her as having "clean-cut, yet slightly exotic looks."

== Early life ==
Peñalver studied at Lycée Français de Valence, a French immersion high school in Valencia. Before modeling, she was an equestrian.

== Career ==
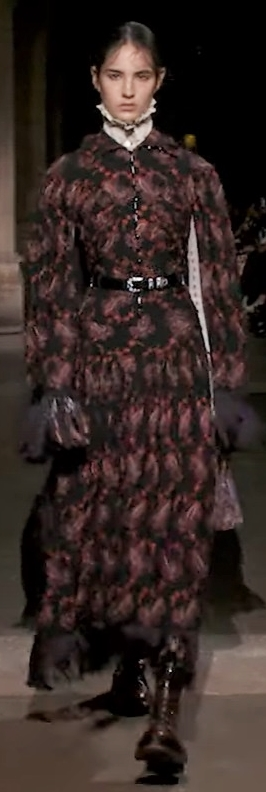
Peñalver walks the runway at the Paco Rabanne Fall-Winter 2020-2021 show

In 2017, Peñalver debuted as a JW Anderson exclusive and walked for the likes of Chanel, Dior, Maison Margiela, Elie Saab, Prada Resort, Loewe, Rodarte (which she closed), Valentino, Alaïa, Isabel Marant, Altuzarra, and Giambattista Valli that year. In January 2019, she appeared on the cover of Vogue España and in February 2020, she appeared on a digital cover of the magazine. Inés Sastre, Miriam Sánchez, and Marina Pérez appeared on the physical cover. In the United Kingdom, she appeared on the cover of The Times's style magazine.

Models.com chose her as one of the "Top Newcomers" (in the breakout category) of the F/W 2020 season.

== Personal life ==
Peñalver supports the Black Lives Matter movement and is interested in anti-racism education. She is also an avid surfer.
