= Clara Alonso =

Clara Alonso may refer to:

- Clara Alonso (model) (born 1987), Spanish model
- Clara Alonso (actress) (born 1990), Argentine actress and singer
