= Nastasia =

Nastasia is a variant of the feminine given name Anastasia. Notable people with this name include:

- Nastasia Nadaud – French professional golfer
- Nastasia Ionescu – Romanian canoeist (born 1954)
- Nastasia Urbano – Spanish model (born 1961
- Nastasia Noens – French alpine skier
- Nastasia Scott – America's Next Top Model season 19 contestant
- Nastassja Kinski – German actress (born 1961)
- Nastasya Samburskaya – Russian actress, singer and TV presenter (born 1987)
- Nastasya Generalova – American rhythmic gymnast

== In fiction ==
- Nastasya Filippovna – Heroine of "The Idiot" by Fyodor Dostoevsky
- Nastasia – a character in Super Paper Mario

== See also ==
- Nina Nastasia
