= The Best Man (1998 film) =

1998 film

- Film poster
- Directed by: Pupi Avati
- Written by: Pupi Avati
- Produced by: Antonio Avati; Aurelio De Laurentiis
- Starring: Diego Abatantuono
- Cinematography: Pasquale Rachini
- Edited by: Amedeo Salfa
- Music by: Riz Ortolani
- Distributed by: Filmauro
- Release date: 6 February 1998
- Running time: 101 minutes
- Country: Italy
- Language: Italian

The Best Man (Italian: Il testimone dello sposo) is a 1998 Italian comedy film written and directed by Pupi Avati. It was entered into the 48th Berlin International Film Festival. The film was selected as the Italian entry for the Best Foreign Language Film at the 70th Academy Awards, but was not accepted as a nominee.

== Cast ==
- Diego Abatantuono as Angelo Beliossi
- Inés Sastre as Francesca Babini
- Dario Cantarelli as Edgardo Osti
- Cinzia Mascoli as Peppina Campeggi
- Valeria D'Obici as Olimpia Campeggi Babini
- Mario Erpichini as Sisto Babini
- Ada Maria Serra Zanetti
- Ugo Conti as Marziano Beliossi
- Nini Salerno as Sauro Ghinassi

== Reception ==
The Best Man has an approval rating of 57% on review aggregator website Rotten Tomatoes, based on 7 reviews, and an average rating of 5.7/10.

== See also ==
- List of submissions to the 70th Academy Awards for Best Foreign Language Film
- List of Italian submissions for the Academy Award for Best Foreign Language Film
