= The Lost City (2005 film) =

- Theatrical release poster
- Directed by: Andy García
- Written by: G. Cabrera Infante
- Produced by: Andy García; Frank Mancuso, Jr.
- Starring: Andy García; Dustin Hoffman; Bill Murray; Inés Sastre; Tomás Milián
- Cinematography: Emmanuel Kaddsh
- Edited by: Christopher Cibelli
- Music by: Andy García
- Production companies: CineSon; Magnolia Pictures; Crescent Drive Pictures
- Distributed by: Lionsgate
- Release dates: September 3, 2005 (Telluride Film Festival); April 28, 2006 (United States)
- Running time: 144 minutes
- Country: United States
- Languages: English; Spanish
- Budget: $9.6 million
- Box office: $4.4 million

The Lost City is a 2005 American drama film directed and co-produced by Andy García. It stars García, Dustin Hoffman, Inés Sastre and Bill Murray. The film depicts the story of Fico Fellove, a wealthy nightclub owner in Havana and his family whose lives are disrupted by the Cuban Revolution. Attempting to remain apolitical, Fellove's family becomes divided when his brothers join the Marxist rebels in their fight against the Batista regime.

The film was a passion project for García, who immigrated from Cuba to Miami at the start of Fidel Castro's rule, and had been trying to make the film for 16 years. It was filmed in the Dominican Republic instead of Cuba, as García was denied entry to the country due to his criticism of Castro. The film received generally negative reviews from critics, who criticized the screenplay, direction and the depiction of historical events. It bombed at the box office, making $4.4 million on a $9.6 million budget.

== Plot ==
Fico Fellove is the owner of El Trópico, a swanky nightclub in Cuba in 1958. He lives for his family and his music while facing the harsh realities of Fulgencio Batista's dictatorial regime. His brother Ricardo becomes a revolutionary for Fidel Castro's rebel army, his brother Luis joins the student opposition, and his father Federico, a well-respected university professor, pushes for change by constitutional, peaceful means.

When Ricardo is arrested and threatened with execution, Fico calls on an old prep-school friend, Castel, now a police captain, for help. Ricardo is released from jail, and Fico offers to help him go to Miami or New York City, but instead, he joins a rebel column headed by Che Guevara.

Fico is approached by Meyer Lansky, of New York's Genovese crime family, who wishes to open up a gambling room at El Trópico. He intends for his club to remain a place of music, so he turns down the offer. When a bomb explodes at the club, killing Fico's star entertainer (who is also his lover), Fico assumes that Lansky is behind it. However, in the increasingly unsettled climate, he cannot be certain.

Luis becomes connected with a plot to seize the presidential palace, kill Batista, and restore democracy. The plot fails and most of the attackers are killed. Luis escapes but is subsequently killed by Batista's secret police. At the urging of his mother, Fico tries to cheer up Luis's distraught widow, Aurora; Fico and Aurora fall in love.

Castro's rebels seize power after Batista flees the country. Fidel Castro declares there will be no elections, and Che Guevara oversees the arrests and summary execution of those who supported the Batista regime. Among those to be executed is Captain Castel. Fico asks Ricardo, now a high-ranking officer in the new regime, to return the favor that Castel once carried out to save Ricardo's life, but Ricardo does nothing to save him.

Ricardo visits his uncle Donoso, a tobacco farmer and cigar maker. Donoso feels that, although Castro may be in power now, "the land endures", and says the farm will pass to him next. Ricardo announces that the reason for his visit is to appropriate the farm for the state. Donoso, furious, has a heart attack and dies. Ricardo, overcome by grief, dies by suicide shortly after the funeral.

The revolution affects Fico in other ways as it takes a communist direction. The musicians' union, controlled by Castro, has declared the saxophone to be an imperialist instrument and forbids its use. The club is eventually shut down on a flimsy pretext. After a chance meeting with Castro, Aurora is declared "Revolutionary Widow of the Year". She begins to work for the State, and ends her relationship with Fico.

Fico's parents beg him to leave Cuba and start a new family. Reluctantly, he procures exit visas for himself and Aurora. In a last effort to convince her to join him, Fico barges in on a reception for revolutionary leaders and Soviet Bloc ambassadors, but Aurora refuses to go. He raises a toast to a democratic Cuba, then leaves the reception. Fico says goodbye to his parents and goes to the airport, where most of his money and possessions — including a prized family pocket watch from his father — are confiscated.

Fico begins a new life in New York. Working as a dishwasher and piano player at a Cuban club, he hopes to save enough money to bring his family to America. Meyer Lansky approaches him with an offer of a Cuban nightclub in Las Vegas, but Fico turns him down. He runs into Aurora, who is in New York as part of a Cuban delegation to the United Nations. He realizes that she is like Cuba: beautiful, alluring, but also damaged and unattainable. He decides that his cause is to build a new life until he can return to the city he lost. Fico recites a poem by Cuban nationalist Father José Martí, and commits himself to returning to his "lost city" someday. He opens a new nightclub in New York.

== Cast ==
- Andy García as Fico Fellove
- Inés Sastre as Aurora Fellove
- Danny Pino as Alberto Mora
- Tomas Milian as Don Federico Fellove
- Millie Perkins as Doña Cecilia Fellove
- Richard Bradford as Don Donoso Fellove
- Nestor Carbonell as Luis Fellove
- Enrique Murciano as Ricardo Fellove
- Dominik García-Lorido as Mercedes Fellove
- Dustin Hoffman as Meyer Lansky
- Bill Murray as The Writer
- Jsu Garcia as Che Guevara
- Juan Fernández de Alarcón as President Fulgencio Batista
- Elizabeth Peña as Miliciana Muñoz
- Victor Rivers as El Indio
- Amelia Vega as Minerva
- Julio Oscar Mechoso as Colonel Candela
- Tony Plana as The Emcee
- Steven Bauer as Captain Castel
- Franklin Domínguez as Lieutenant Dario

== Depictions ==
=== Che Guevara ===
In one scene, Che Guevara (Jsu Garcia) is shown after an ambush casually shooting a wounded Batista soldier where he lies. Later in the film, Guevara asks Fico Fellove why he "bothers with such scum", in reference to a former Batista officer who was executed that morning.

=== Bill Murray as "The Writer" ===
Bill Murray appears in the movie as "The Writer". He appears early in the movie asking Fico for a job, and hovers around Fico, commenting on the absurdities of life, although never playing a clear part in those absurdities. According to the "making-of" documentary, the role is similar to that of a Greek chorus, and is really the personality of the movie's author, G. Cabrera Infante. The "making-of" video claims that Murray was given some latitude in improvising dialogue; the scene toward the end in which The Writer and Meyer Lansky discuss egg creams was almost entirely improvised.

== Location ==
The movie was filmed in various locations in the Dominican Republic due to similarity of landscape, vegetation and architecture. The palace scenes were filmed at the Dominican National Palace, and the tobacco estate is that of Arturo Fuente.

== Critical response ==
The film received generally unfavorable reviews. Rotten Tomatoes gives the film a 26% approval rating, based on 82 reviews. The stated consensus is: "What starts as a promising exercise devolves into an overlong, unevenly directed disappointment." Metacritic, which uses a weighted average, assigned the film a score of 47 out of 100, based on 23 critics, indicating "mixed or average" reviews.

Michael Atkinson of The Village Voice critiqued the historical validity of the film, stating, "García's tale bemoans the loss of easy wealth for a precious few. Poor people are absolutely absent; García and Infante seem to have thought that peasant revolutions happen for no particular reason—or at least no reason the moneyed 1 percent should have to worry about."

Stephen Holden of The New York Times described the political dialogue in the film as "strictly of the junior high school variety", while opining that the "characters pontificate in generalities and aphorisms", making them "little more than stick figures with cartoon balloons pasted over their heads".

- Imagen Awards 2006

== See also ==
- List of American films of 2005
