= Michael McNay =

British journalist and author (1935–2026)

- Born: Michael George McNay; 7 March 1935; Rawalpindi, Punjab Province, British India
- Died: 25 July 2026 (aged 91)
- Occupations: Journalist and author
- Notable credit: The Guardian

Michael George McNay (7 March 1935 – 25 July 2026) was a British journalist and author. He worked for 37 years at The Guardian, where he was arts editor. He was also the author of several books.

== Biography ==
McNay was born in Rawalpindi, Punjab Province in what was then British India, to Harold McNay, an army staff sergeant, and his wife Eleanora Yanischek. On the 1947 partition of India in 1947, McNay moved to Britain, where his Darlington grammar school education was followed by National Service.

After jobs as a trainee reporter with the Oxford Mail and the Bedford Times, in 1963 McNay was employed by The Guardian as a sub-editor in the paper's Manchester office, graduating to the features department in London, and eventually becoming arts editor.

He was given charge of the project to redesign the Guardian in the mid-1980s, and enlisted help from graphic designer David Hillman. The official history Witness in a Time of Turmoil: Inside the Guardian's Global Revolution, by Ian Mayes, describes McNay as "the most vociferous and talented, even belligerent, advocate of newspaper design", with his obituary in the paper acknowledging that no one did more than McNay to shape the modern appearance of The Guardian.

== Personal life ==
In 1957, McNay married Marian Milne, with whom he had two children. After divorcing, in 1974 he married Sue Pilkington, and they had a daughter.

McNay died on 25 July 2026, aged 91.

== Works ==
- Portrait of a Kentish Village: East Malling, Victor Gollancz Ltd, 1980, ISBN 978-0-575-02876-0
- With Eamonn McCabe, Artists & Their Studios, Angela Patchell Books, 2008, ISBN 978-1-906245-06-1
- Hidden Treasures of England: A Guide to the Country's Best-kept Secrets, Random House Books, 2009, ISBN 978-1-905211-83-8
