= Fabienne Terwinghe =

Belgian model (born 1968)

- Born: 1968 (age 57–58)
- Occupation: Model
- Modeling information
- Height: 5 ft 11 in (180 cm)
- Hair color: brown
- Eye color: brown
- Agency: Ford Models

Fabienne Terwinghe, also spelled "Therwinghe" (born 1968) is a Belgian model who was active during the late 1980s and 1990s.

== Early life ==
Terwinghe grew up in Belgium. She reached her full adult height at age 14, and stated she was uncomfortable with her tall stature due to teasing from peers. She expressed an interest in modeling in her teens, and cut her hair short to help achieve a unique image.

== Career ==
Terwinghe walked the runway for Gianfranco Ferré, Ralph Lauren, Complice, Krizia, Max Mara, and Industria in the early 1990s. She also modeled for a large number of advertisements, including those for Armani, Anne Klein, Chico's, Dior, Lancaster, Nautica, and Pierre Balmain. Some of her more prestigious and successful modeling work was for cosmetic house Revlon in one of the "Unforgettable Women" advertisements, photographed by Richard Avedon. Terwinghe appeared with fellow models Cordula Reyer, Michaela Bercu, and Carré Otis for the print ad. Terwinghe later became a spokes model for cosmetic house Helena Rubinstein. Another high-profile endorsement of Fabienne Terwinghe's was for lingerie, fashion, and beauty brand Victoria's Secret. She was also the cover subject for the American and Italian editions of Elle, the Italian edition of |Marie Claire, and the Spanish edition of Vogue.

She also appeared in the music video for New Order's "Round and Round" from the 1989 album Technique.

== Anti-fur activism ==
In 1994, with fellow models Naomi Campbell, Tatjana Patitz, Heather Stewart-Whyte and Emma Wiklund, Terwinghe posed nude in a PETA anti-fur ad. Terwinghe has stated that throughout her modeling career, she has refused to pose wearing fur.
