= Nastya Sten =

Russian model

- Born: Anastasia Stepanova; 22 March 1995 (age 31); Moscow, Russia
- Modeling information
- Height: 1.80 m (5 ft 11 in)
- Hair color: Blonde
- Eye color: Blue
- Agency: The Society Management (New York); Elite Model Management (Paris, Milan, London, Barcelona, Copenhagen); Modellink (Gothenburg); Avant Models Agency (Moscow); MP Stockholm (Stockholm); Vivien's Model Management - Sydney (Sydney)

Anastasia Stepanova (Russian: Анастасия «Настя Стен» Степанова; born 22 March 1995), known professionally as Nastya Sten, is a Russian fashion model.

Sten was born in Moscow, Russia. She started her modeling career when she was 17. The first serious work for her became the Proenza Schouler spring/summer 2014 fashion show during New York Fashion Week.

Fall/Winter 2014–15 season became breakthrough for Sten. She took part in 63 shows, 4 opened and 2 closed.

Sten appeared in the editorials of magazines such as AnOther, CR Fashion Book, Dazed & Confused, GARAGE, Heroine Magazine, i-D, Interview, The Last Magazine, LOVE, Numéro, Russh, V Magazine, British Vogue, Vogue Brazil, Vogue Italia, Vogue Japan, Vogue Russia and graced the covers of Glass Magazine, Numéro China, Vogue Russia, Vogue Turkey and Harper’s Bazaar UK. For the cover of Russian Vogue, Sten starred with her best friend, top model Sasha Luss. Sten also appeared in the film Anna, in which Luss starred.
