= Clara Alonso (model) =

Spanish model (born 1987)

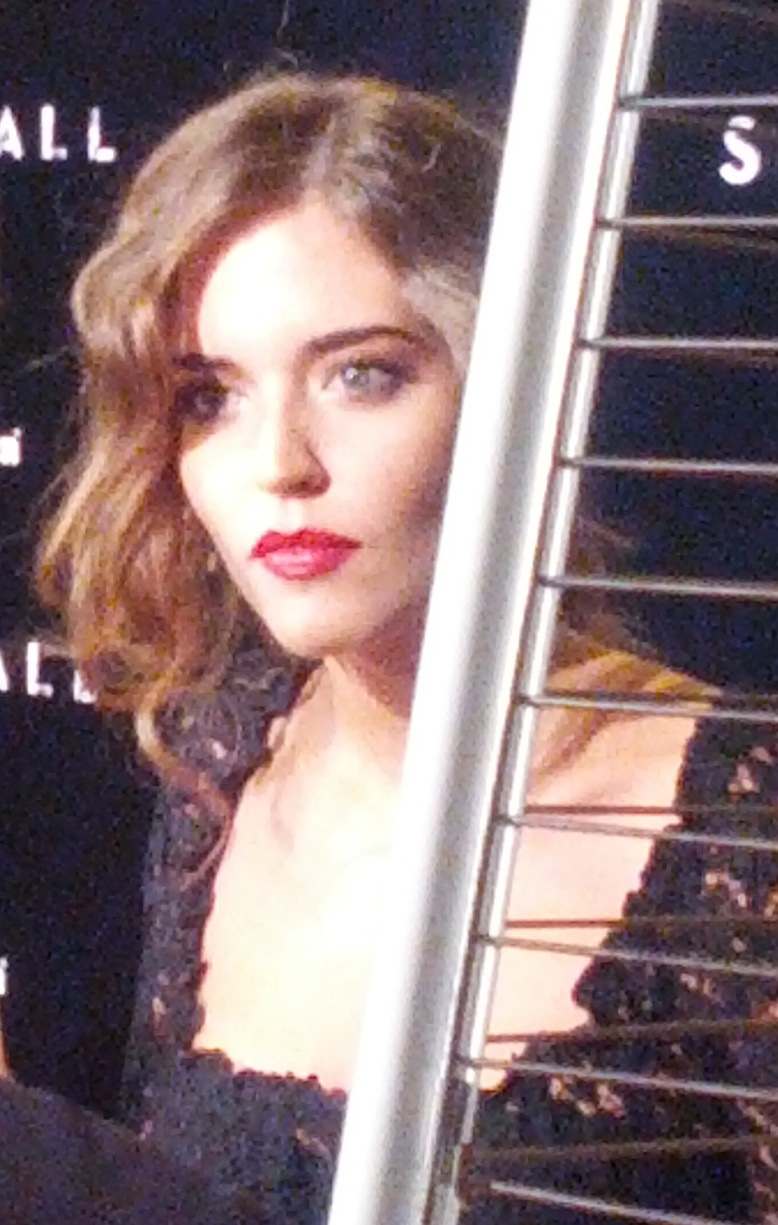
- Alonso in 2023
- Born: 21 September 1987 (age 39); Madrid, Spain
- Occupation: Model
- Modeling information
- Height: 1.76 m (5 ft 9 1/2 in)
- Hair color: Light Brown
- Eye color: Green
- Agency: New York Model Management (New York); Marilyn Agency (Paris); Women Management (Milan); LINE UP MODEL MANAGEMENT (Barcelona); Modelwerk (Hamburg); Stockholmsgruppen (Stockholm)

Clara Alonso (born 21 September 1987) is a Spanish model. Alonso was the only Spanish model to walk in the 2008 Victoria's Secret Fashion Show since 1999. She has been the face of GUESS and AX Armani Exchange. In December 2020, Alonso gave birth to her first son, and in November 2022 to her second.

== Career ==
A regular in the Spanish runways, Alonso didn't make the jump internationally until she finished her studies. Once completing her studies she coincided with John Pfeiffer. In Florence, June 2008, Diane von Furstenberg hired Alonso for her "Cruise 2008-09" collection and months later was called to New York for the Spring-Summer 2009 fashion shows. While in New York, she also had the opportunity to work for Custo Barcelona. At 21 Alonso became Spain's new top model, chosen to be in the Victoria's Secret 2008 fashion show held in Miami. Only two Spaniards, Esther Cañadas in 1997, and Eugenia Silva in 1998 and 1999, had previously participated in the Victoria's Secret fashion show.

She has walked for Bottega Veneta, Luisa Beccaria, Brian Reyes, Nanette Lepore, Oscar de la Renta, Tory Burch, Cynthia Steffe, Luca Luca, Diane von Furstenberg, Lela Rose, Prabal Gurung, Abaeté, and Resort 2009 Diane von Furstenberg.

Alonso won L´Oreal award best model for Cibeles f/w 2010. She is the face for Agua Fresca de Rosas fragrance by Adolfo Domínguez and appears in its TV spot. She also did the lingerie campaign for GUESS shot by Yu Tsai in Los Angeles Stars in AX Armani Exchange Spring 2011 advertising campaign with compatriot Alejandra Alonso. In 2014, Alonso was the face of the new Triumph Essence product range for lingerie manufacturer Triumph International.

Alonso had a Spanish language blog for Vogue Spain where she connected with other fashionistas.

In 2015, she appeared for Pantene Water Damage campaign.
