= Miriam Sánchez =

Spanish fashion model

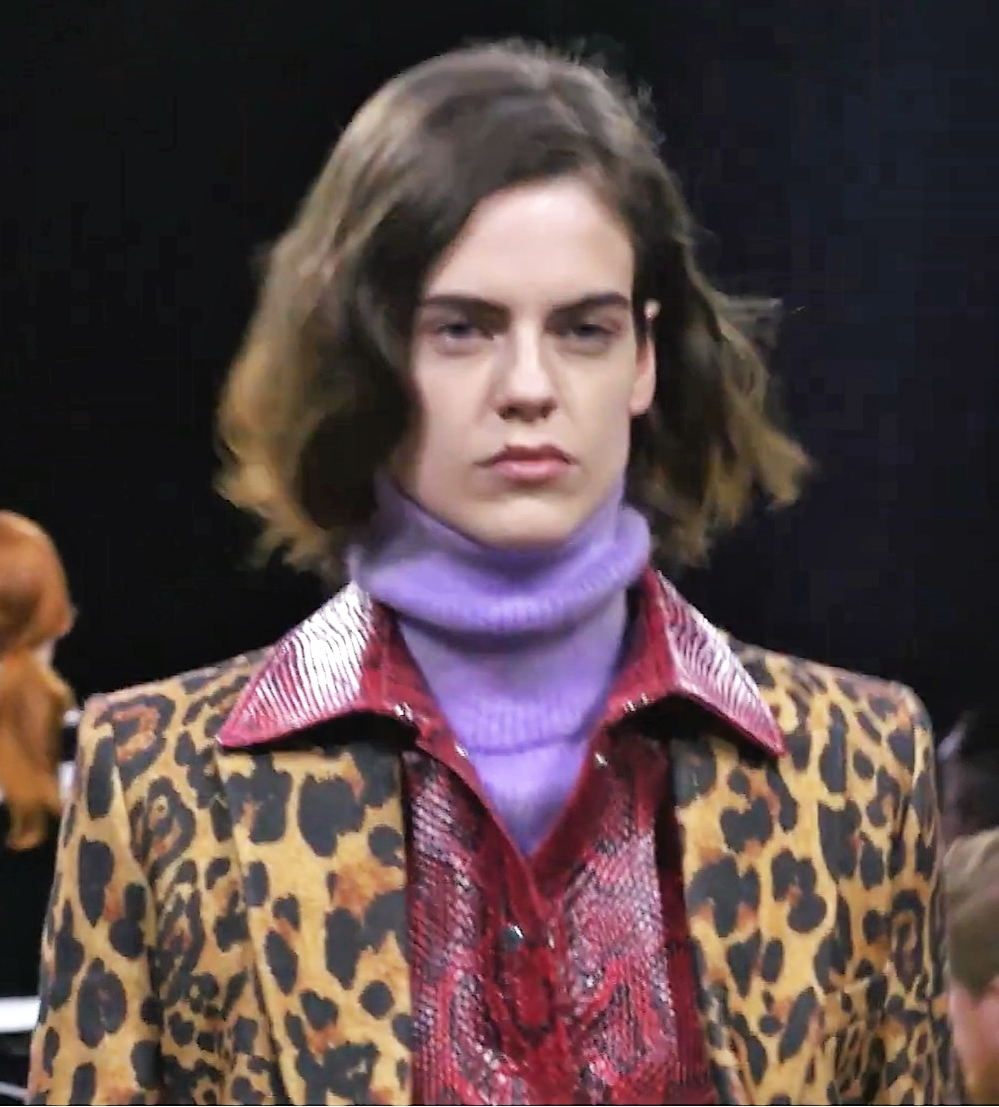
- Sánchez walks at the Paco Rabanne Fall Winter 2019-20 show
- Born: 10 January 1996 (age 30); Madrid, Spain
- Occupation: Model
- Modeling information
- Height: 1.78 m (5 ft 10 in)
- Hair color: Brown
- Eye color: Blue
- Agency: Ford Models (New York); IMG Models (London, Paris); Unique Models (Copenhagen); Modelwerk (Hamburg); Traffic Models (Barcelona) (mother agency)

Miriam Sánchez (born 10 January 1996) is a Spanish fashion model. She has appeared on the cover of Spanish and Italian Vogue.

== Career ==
Sánchez (who is a business administration student) was initially discovered at age 16, and eventually signed to Traffic Models in Barcelona, Spain. Traffic sent her to agencies in Paris, France, with the idea that if she did not sign to a top agency, that she would be sent to a lower-tier agency. All five of the agencies she visited immediately offered a contract and she was signed by Ford Models. Days later debuted as a Louis Vuitton exclusive, chosen by casting director Ashley Brokaw, and opened the S/S 19 fashion show. In addition to Vuitton, she walked for brands like Michael Kors, Haider Ackermann, Bottega Veneta, Fendi, Jason Wu, Christopher Kane, Rag & Bone, Helmut Lang, Victoria Beckham, and Prada.

In 2020, she appeared on Vogue España's February cover alongside Marina Pérez and Inés Sastre; and on the August cover by herself. In its April issue, she appeared in an ensemble Vogue editorial about international models, including American models Ugbad Abdi and Kaia Gerber, and Australian model Adut Akech on its cover.

In 2021, she appeared on Vogue Italia's May cover.

Miriam is currently ranked as a Top 50 models by models.com.

In advertising campaigns, she has modeled for Prada, Louis Vuitton, Yves Saint Laurent, Dior, Zegna, Sportmax, Dsquared2, Uterqüe, Bimba y Lola and more
