= Cordula Reyer =

Austrian model and fashion journalist

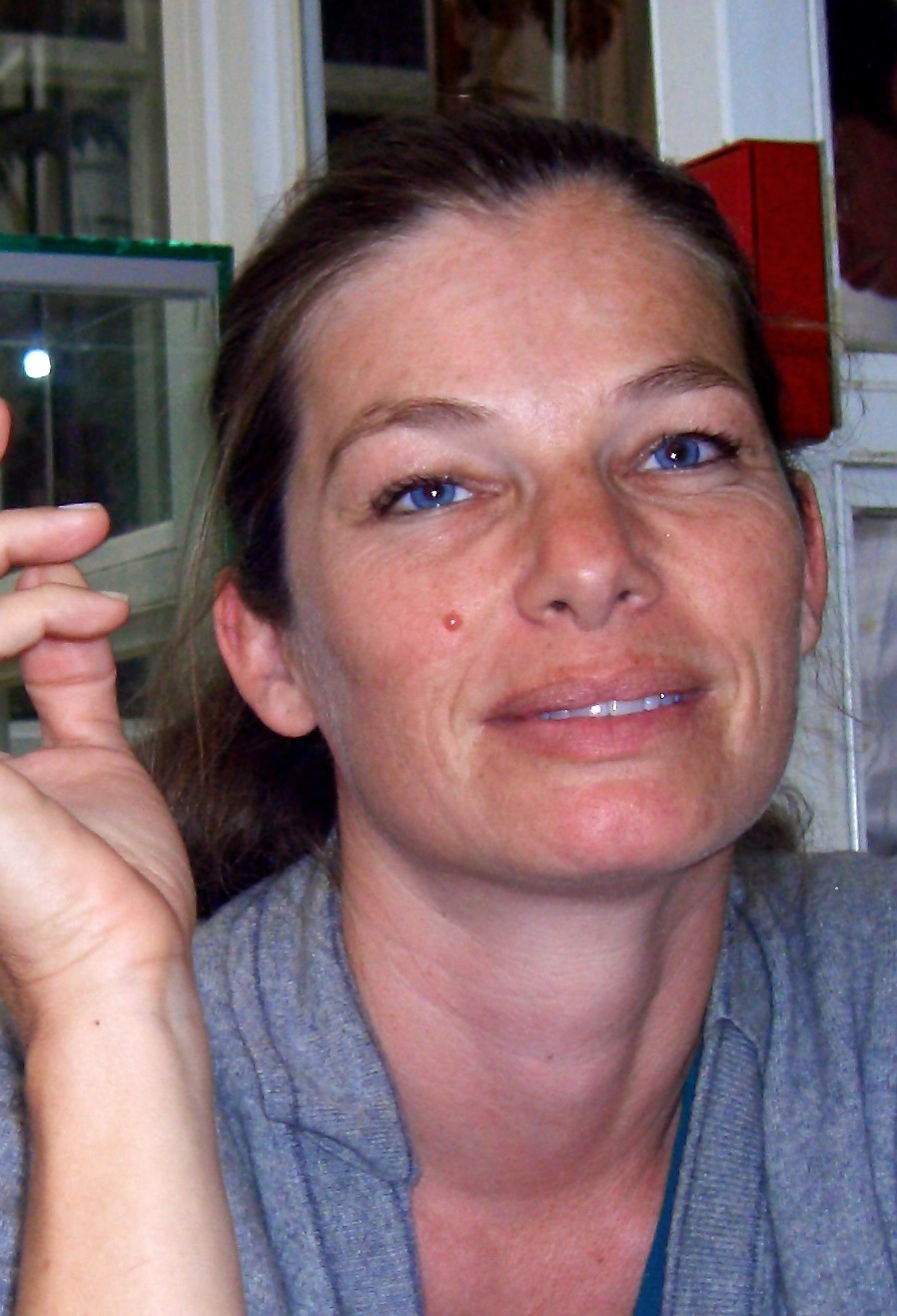
- Cordula Reyer (2005)
- Born: 1964 (age 61–62); Vienna, Austria
- Occupations: model, fashion journalist
- Modeling information
- Height: 5 ft 10 in (1.78 m)
- Hair color: Dark blonde
- Eye color: Blue

Cordula Reyer (born 1964) is an Austrian runway, magazine and advertisement model who later became a fashion journalist. She rose to prominence during the supermodel era of the 1980s and 1990s.

== Early career ==
Reyer began her career with runway modeling for various shows in Europe, such as Yves Saint Laurent and Helmut Lang. She expressed an interest in modeling in the United States, and contacted an American agency through her hairstylist at the time, Peter Savic. She was 25 years old when she began modeling in America, and had a son. It was uncommon at the time for mothers to have modeling careers, and Reyer has stated that juggling motherhood and modeling was difficult.

== Runway modeling ==
Reyer became a regular fixture at numerous runway shows, including Dolce & Gabbana, Prada, Comme des Garçons, Jil Sander, Max Mara, Thierry Mugler, and Bottega Veneta.

== Magazine modeling ==
Reyer was featured in the American, British, French, and German editions of Vogue, French and German editions of Marie Claire, German edition of Elle, French edition of Glamour, and the American Another Magazine.

== Advertisement modeling ==
Reyer's most high-profile advertising campaign was for American cosmetic company Revlon in the famous "Unforgettable Women" series photographed by Richard Avedon. Reyer appeared alongside Belgian model Fabienne Terwinghe, Israeli model Michaela Bercu, and American model Carré Otis for the print ad. Reyer also modeled for Adrienne Vittadini, Anne Kleinlein, Bloomingdale's, DKNY, Eddie Bauer, Enrico Coveri, Gap, Iceberg, and Katharine Hamnett ads.

== Present career and fashion journalism ==
Reyer has retired from modeling and has now begun a career as a fashion journalist. Her first project was interviewing Bottega Veneta designer Tomas Maier for Swiss magazine NZZ in September 2009.
