= Heather Marks =

Canadian model (born 1988)

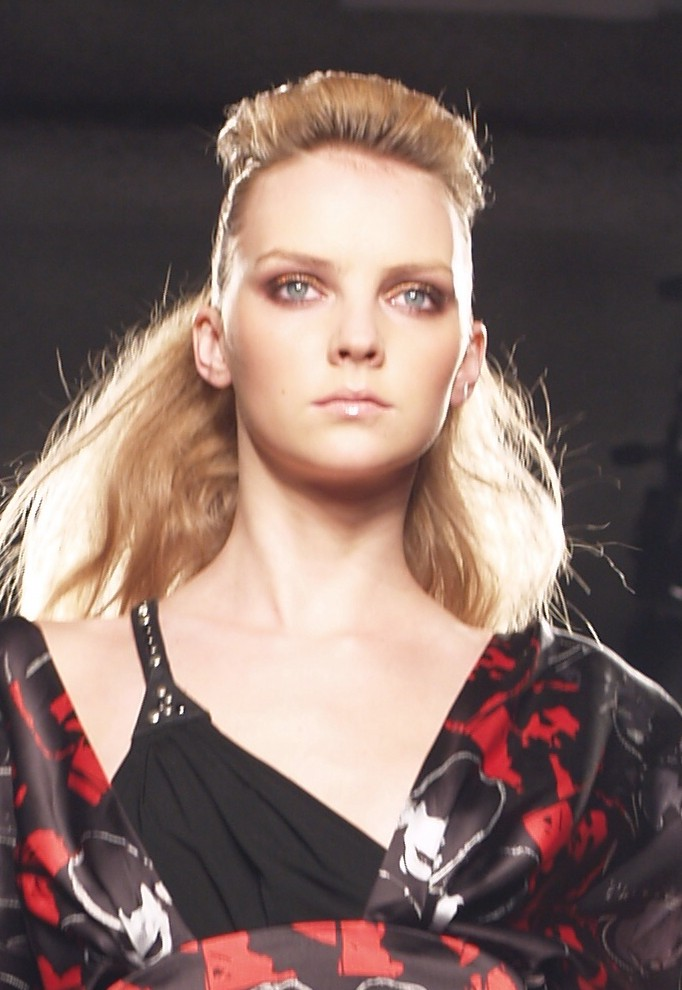
- Heather Marks modeling for Miss Sixty, Fall 2007 New York Fashion Week
- Born: July 25, 1988 (age 38); Calgary, Alberta, Canada
- Modeling information
- Height: 1.80 m (5 ft 11 in)
- Hair color: Light brown
- Eye color: Blue-grey
- Agency: Women / 360 (New York); Women Management (Paris, Milan); Select Model Management (London); Uno Models (Barcelona); Scoop Models (Copenhagen); DAS Model Management (Miami); Louisa Models (Munich)

Heather Marks (born July 25, 1988) is a Canadian model known in the fashion world for her big eyes and "doll-like" or elven features. Her high fashion looks have booked her many campaigns, and her career has followed those of other doll-like models, Gemma Ward, Caroline Trentini, Lily Cole, Vlada Roslyakova, and Jessica Stam.

== Early life ==
Marks was born in Calgary, Alberta, and was discovered at the Calgary Woman's Show at the age of 12 (already 178 cm tall) by Kelly Streit, the owner of Mode Models. He invited her to enter Mode's upcoming model search, which she won. She was still not convinced on the idea of modelling and agreed to help Streit with taking on jobs a few times a month.

== Career ==
At almost 15 Marks was sent to Toronto and began booking jobs in New York, including her first editorial for Italian Vogue. She made her runway debut at the Givenchy Spring 2003 couture show. She made her ready-to-wear show debut in the Spring/Summer 2004 season, in which she walked over 43 shows (including Anna Sui, Blumarine, Burberry, Chanel, D&G, Givenchy, Lanvin, Louis Vuitton, Marc by Marc Jacobs, Marni, MaxMara, Rochas, Sportmax and Versus by Versace). In each the Spring/Summer 2005 and Fall/Winter 2005 catwalk show seasons she walked in over 70 shows.

Marks has since done shows and advertisements for D & G, Calvin Klein, Emporio Armani, Marc by Marc Jacobs, Max Mara, Moschino, Kenzo, Jimmy Choo, Lacoste, Anna Sui, Christian Lacroix, Just Cavalli, Badgley Mischka, Jeremy Laing, Sisley and other prominent fashion designers. She has also appeared in advertisements for H&M, Aubin & Wills, Converse, Victoria's Secret, Lui Jeans, American Eagle, Benetton, Blanco, Cacharel, Daks, GAP, Holt Renfrew, Lee Jeans, Levi's, Mango, Sportmax, Swarovski, Trussardi and Via Spiga. She is very well known in the industry as a beauty and money model, as she has appeared in cosmetics campaigns for Anna Sui, Revlon, MAC and NARS, VDL Cosmetics as well her many turns in the beauty editions of both Japanese and Italian Vogue.

She has appeared on the covers of magazines such as the German, Korean, Latinoamerican, Mexican and Spanish editions of Vogue, the Croatian, Canadian, and Italian editions of Elle in addition to Harper's Bazaar, Dazed, French, Velvet, Flair, Fashion, BLACK and Mixte. In 2006 she participated in the Victoria's Secret Fashion Show. Marks has also appeared in the catalogs for Bloomingdales, Burberry, Louis Vuitton, Lloyd Jewelry, Saks Fifth Avenue, Neiman Marcus, Bergdorf Goodman, Holt Renfrew, Max Mara, Americana Manhasset and Aubin & Wills

She also had a role in the feature film Silent Hill: Revelation 3D (2012).

== Personal life ==
Marks currently lives in Greenwich Village with her English Bulldog, Otis. She has said that she used to be a "tomboy" and is a fan of wakeboarding, snowboarding, and soccer. She has a younger brother (Stephen) and two older sisters (Shelly and Tracy). She also owns a cabin in Shuswap, British Columbia, where she stays for at least one month a year.

== Agencies ==
- Mode Calgary/Edmonton/Portland (Mother Agency)
- Giovanni Model Management (Toronto)
- Women New York
- Women Milan
- Women Paris
- Select London
- Louisa Hamburg/Munich
