= Michelle Behennah =

British model

- Born: 7 January 1977 (age 49); Singapore
- Occupation: Model

Michelle Behennah (born 7 January 1977) is a British model.

== Modelling career ==
Behennah has modeled swimsuits for Sports Illustrated's Swimsuit Issue, in 1999, 2000 and 2001. In addition to her Sports Illustrated shoots, she was the object/subject of Joanne Gair's inaugural body painting works as part of the Sports Illustrated Swimsuit Issue.
