= Filippa Hamilton =

French model

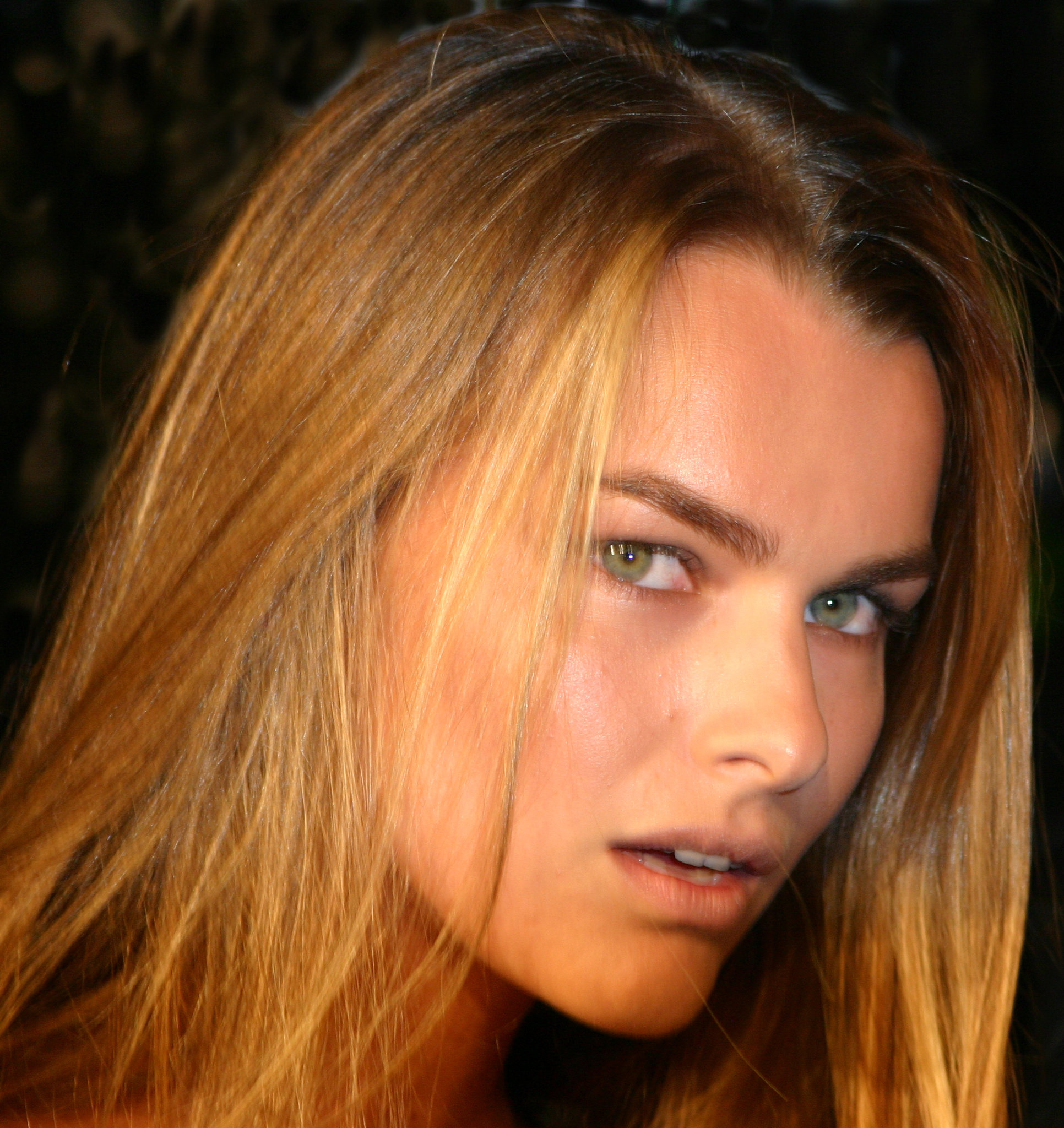
- Filippa Palmstierna Hamilton, September 2007
- Born: 3 December 1985 (age 40); Paris, France
- Modeling information
- Height: 1.78 m (5 ft 10 in)
- Hair color: Brown
- Eye color: Green
- Agency: Marilyn Agency (New York); Next Management (London, Milan); Le Management (Copenhagen); MIKAs (Stockholm)

Filippa Palmstierna Hamilton (born 3 December 1985), also known as Filippa Hamilton-Palmstierna, is a French model.

Hamilton was born in Paris and raised in Biarritz, France. She was discovered at age 15 on the streets of Paris by French photographer Marc Hispard. She secured her first major advertising campaign at age 16 with Ralph Lauren. On NBC's "Today show" with Meredith Vieira, Hamilton stated she had worked for Lauren since she was 17. She was the new face of Romance, Ralph Lauren's fragrance, photographed by Bruce Weber. Hamilton has been photographed by Paolo Roversi, Mario Testino, Arthur Elgort, Inez van Lamsweerde, Terry Richardson and Gilles Bensimon.

In an interview with Ralph Lauren's Polo brand, she said she enjoys painting and spending time with friends. She travels to fashion shows and photo shoots with her mother.

Her father is Michaël Palmstierna Hamilton, an extramarital son of baroness Margaretha Palmstierna and, according to a ruling by the Supreme Court of Sweden in 1999, count Ulph Hamilton. Her mother, Beatrice Hamilton, is a clothing and jewelry designer.

Hamilton married professional surfer Mikaël "Miky" Picon on 25 June 2016. They have a son together. She gave birth to his son, Kyan, in October 2014.

== Ralph Lauren photograph controversy ==
In 2009, Hamilton appeared in a Ralph Lauren advertisement, which had been used only in Japan and digitally edited to make her appear improbably thin, with hips and a waist smaller than her head. The ad was widely circulated and ridiculed on various blogs, especially after Ralph Lauren attempted to use Digital Millennium Copyright Act notices to prevent its publication. Ralph Lauren subsequently apologized for the image, which was posted widely on the Internet and on television, saying, "We have learned that we are responsible for the poor imaging and retouching that resulted in a very distorted image of a woman's body."

Shortly after the digital photo manipulation controversy, Hamilton announced that she had been fired for being "too fat", saying the issue had moved her to speak out. On Today, she claimed to have received a letter stating, "We're terminating your services because you don't fit into the sample clothes that you need to wear."
