= Giovanni Gastel =

Italian photographer (1955–2021)

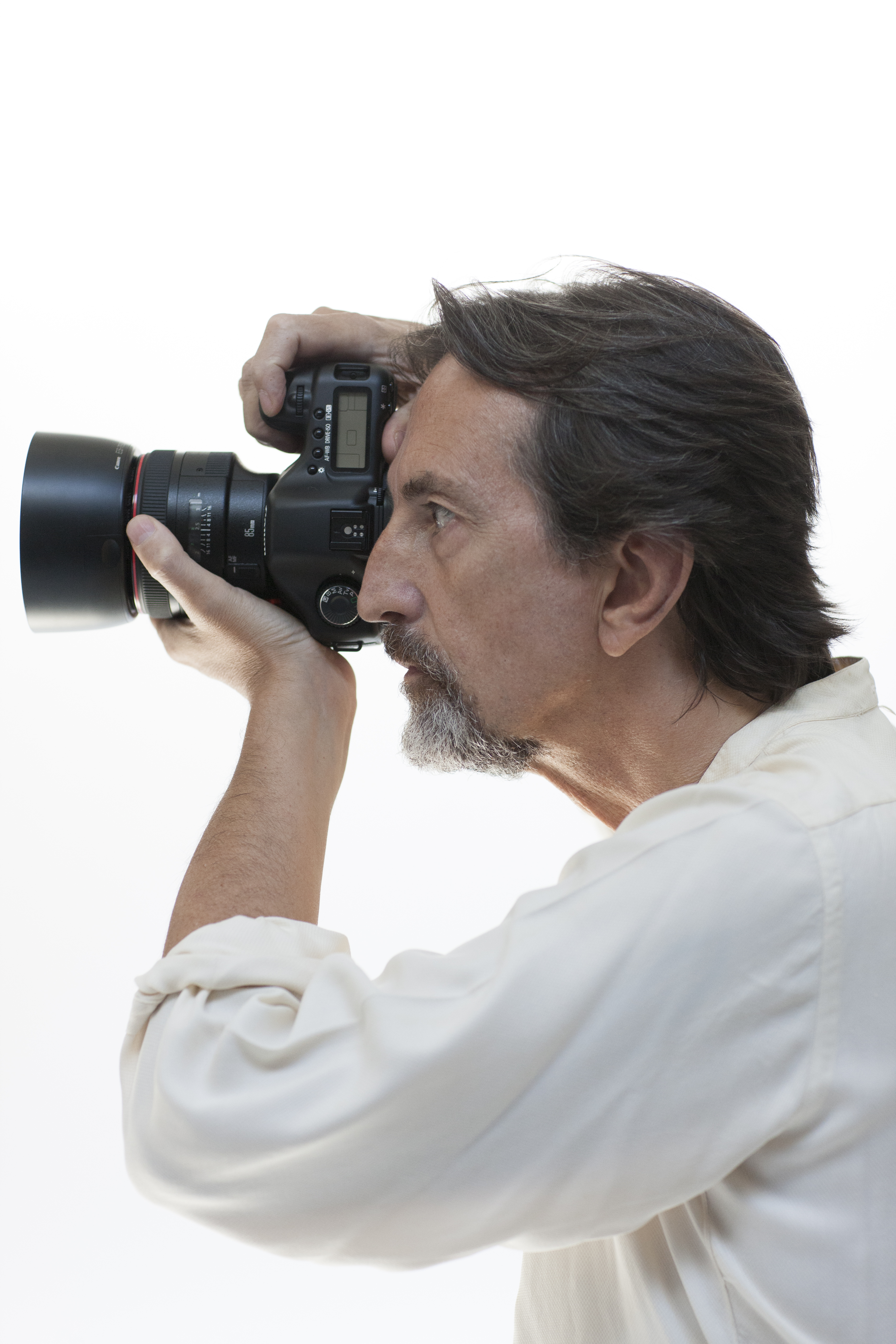
- Born: 27 December 1955; Milan, Italy
- Died: 13 March 2021 (aged 65); Milan, Italy
- Occupation: Photographer

Giovanni Gastel (27 December 1955 – 13 March 2021) was an Italian photographer.

== Biography ==
Giovanni Gastel began photography in the early 1970s.

In 1981, he started working for numerous fashion magazines, including Vogue, Elle, and Vanity Fair; he also collaborated with world-famous brands such as Dior, Trussardi, Krizia, Tod's, and Versace.

During these years of intense professional commitment, he began to develop his personal style, characterized by a poetic irony. His passion for art history led him to introduce a taste for balanced composition into photographs. His references are to Pop Art and Irving Penn's photographic work.

From 15 September 2020 to 5 March 2021, the MAXXI Museum in Rome presented the exhibition “Giovanni Gastel, The People I Like”.

Gastel died from COVID-19 in Milan on 13 March 2021, at the age of 65, during the COVID-19 pandemic in Italy.
