= Laura Ponte =

Spanish model

Laura Ponte y Martínez (born 9 June 1973 in Vigo) is a Spanish model, daughter of José Manuel Ponte Mittelbrunn (born 1942) and wife Marcela Martínez Zapico (born ca. 1945). She entered the fashion industry in 1993 and has worked for Valentino, Lagerfeld, and Ralph Lauren, among others.

She married Luis Beltrán Ataulfo Alfonso Gómez-Acebo y Borbón (b. Madrid, 20 May 1973) on 18 September 2004, at La Granja de San Ildefonso, in Segovia. Her husband is the son of Infanta Pilar, Duchess of Badajoz, and the nephew of King Juan Carlos I of Spain. They have two children, Luis Felipe and Laura. The couple reportedly separated in May 2010.
