= Valentina Zelyaeva =

Russian-American supermodel (born 1982)

- Валентина Зеляева
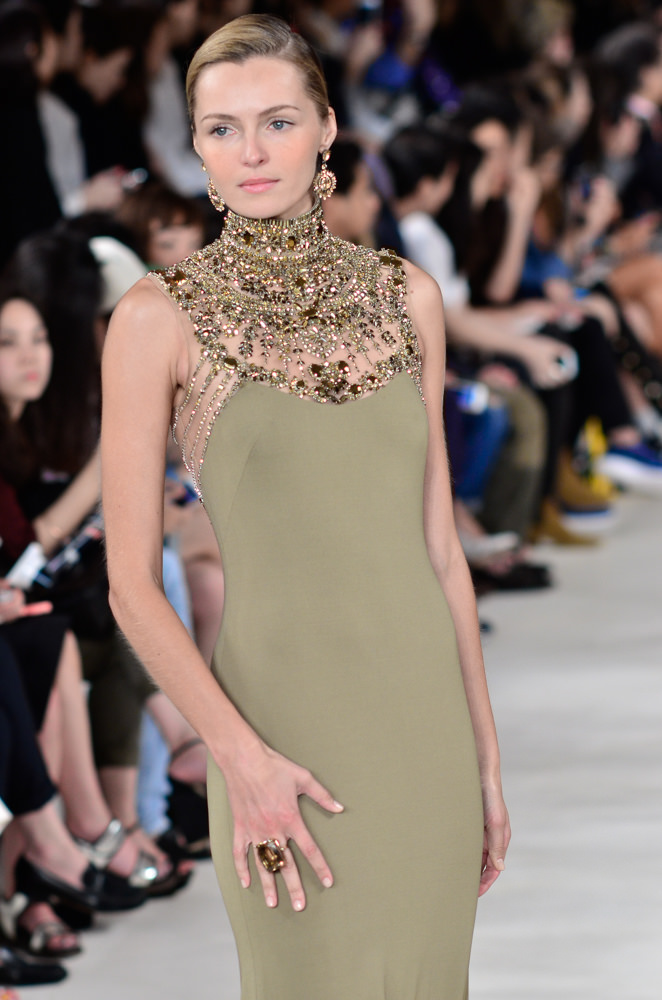
- Zelyaeva in 2015
- Born: 11 October 1982 (age 42); Ulan-Ude, Russia
- Occupation: Model
- Years active: 2003–present
- Modeling information
- Height: 177 cm (5 ft 10 in)
- Hair color: Blonde
- Eye color: Blue
- Website: www.valentinazelyaeva.com

Valentina Zelyaeva (born 11 October 1982) is a Russian-American supermodel. Zelyaeva is best known for being the face of Ralph Lauren for 7 years. In 2008, Zelyaeva was the 13th highest-paid model in the world, earning $2.3 million.

== Early life ==
Valentina Zelyaeva was born in Ulan-Ude, a city in Siberia. Her father was a soldier and her mother wanted to become a teacher. The family later moved to Saint Petersburg and then settled down in Moscow when she was 7.

== Career ==
Zelyaeva got her start as a fashion model when she was 15. A friend of hers handed her modelling card, but she was too shy to call at first. Her mother then took her to the agency where she was immediately signed. Zelyaeva entered the Elite Model Look contest, but she didn't win. Afterwards, Zelyaeva started working in Japan for 2 years, where she learned English and started to support her family back in Russia.

Zelyaeva's breakthrough came in 2003, Ralph Lauren was very impressed by her and let her open his show and booked her for the upcoming campaign. Zelyaeva was sent to a modelling school in Milan in order to learn how to behave in front of the camera and how to walk in the catwalk. Throughout her career, Zelyaeva has been featured on the cover of Spanish, Chinese, Greek and Mexican edition of Vogue and has appeared on the cover of Elle and Harper's Bazaar.

Zelyaeva has been featured on the print advertisements for Tommy Hilfiger, Coach, Calvin Klein and Ralph Lauren for whom she signed a deal for 7 years appearing on his campaigns. Zelyaeva has walked the runways for Balenciaga, Christian Dior, Dolce & Gabbana, Fendi, Valentino, Versace and Gucci. Zelyaeva was also the face of two L'Oreal campaigns.

Zelyaeva got her first US modeling work in New York City in September 2003. She served as the "face of Ralph Lauren" beginning in 2005. In 2008, Forbes estimated that Zelyaeva was the world's 13th-highest-earning model.
