= Eamonn McCabe =

British photographer (1948–2022)

- Born: Eamonn Patrick McCabe; 28 July 1948; Highgate, London, England
- Died: 2 October 2022 (aged 74); Saxmundham, England
- Occupation: Photographer

Eamonn Patrick McCabe (28 July 1948 – 2 October 2022) was a British photographer. He began as a sports photographer and later worked in editorial portrait photography. Many of his portraits are held in the collection of the National Portrait Gallery, London.

== Early life and education ==
Eamonn Patrick McCabe was born in Highgate, North London on 28 July 1948, to Celia (née Henchy), a hotel receptionist, and James McCabe, a taxi driver. He briefly attended film school in San Francisco, but was otherwise self-taught in photography.

== Career ==
McCabe worked for local newspapers in north London, including the Hampstead & Highgate Express, where he said he “cut his teeth” as a photographer. He covered Arsenal, Tottenham Hotspur and Saracens, and was himself a lifelong Tottenham Hotspur supporter. McCabe started working for The Observer in 1976, following a brief spell in the music industry. He began his career as a sports photographer, winning Sports Photographer of the Year four times between 1978 and 1984. He then turned his attention to general editorial portraiture for The Observer and The Guardian. He made photographic contributions to the weekly Guardian Profile.

His work encompasses a variety of subjects and topics, but he has largely concentrated on portraits of those in the arts. These include actors, writers, poets, artists, and musicians. It was as a sports photographer that he was attending the 1985 European Cup Final between Liverpool and Juventus, but he ended up being a news photographer as he found himself taking the famous but tragic images of the Heysel Stadium disaster. He was honoured as news photographer of the year for the photos he took of the disaster. McCabe also photographed matches between Bjorn Borg and John McEnroe, Brendan Foster winning the 10,000-metre race at the 1978 AAA Championships in the rain, Li Zhenshi and his extremely high serve, and The Boat Race 1978 that saw the sinking of Cambridge's boat.

From the late 1980s McCabe moved more into landscape and portrait photography. McCabe served briefly as picture editor of SportsWeek, before being recruited as picture editor of The Guardian by Peter Preston. He went on to be recognized as picture editor of the year a record six times. From 2000 McCabe focussed more on artistic portraiture. In 2001 he returned to freelancing, supplying the Guardian and other newspapers and magazines. One series of photographs for the Guardian Review was a study of writers desks, his work included the desks of Beryl Bainbridge, Seamus Heaney and Hilary Mantel. McCabe later worked as the picture editor for Decade, Phaidon's photographic review of the first ten years of the new Millennium.

McCabe was visiting senior fellow in photography at the University of Suffolk, held an honorary doctorate of the University of East Anglia and Staffordshire University, and was an honorary professor at Thames Valley University.

== Personal life and death ==
McCabe was married to journalist Rebecca Smithers until his death. Together, they had one child. He also had another child from a previous marriage.

McCabe died at his home in Saxmundham, Suffolk, on 2 October 2022, aged 74.

== Publications ==
- Eamonn McCabe: Sports Photographer. London: Aurum, 1982. Compiled by Geoffrey Nicholson. ISBN 978-0906053393. With a foreword by Hugh McIlvanney.
- The Pope in Britain: the Official Record. London: Bodley Head, 1982. ISBN 9780370309255. With forewords by Basil Hume and Gordon Gray.
- Eamonn McCabe: Photographer. London: Kingswood, 1987. ISBN 9780434981106. With text by Simon Barnes and a foreword by Edward Lucie-Smith.
- The Making of Great Photographs: approaches and techniques of the masters. Newton Abbot: David & Charles, 2005; 2008.
- Artists and their Studios. Battle: Angela Patchell, 2008. Photographs by McCabe and text by Michael McNay. ISBN 9781906245061.
- Decade. Phaidon, 2010. Edited by McCabe. ISBN 978-0714857688. With text by Terence McNamee.
- From Above: The Story of Aerial Photography. Laurence King, 2019. By McCabe and Gemma Padley. ISBN 978-1786275219.

== Collections ==
McCabe's work is held in the following permanent collection:

- National Portrait Gallery, London: 29 prints (as of 28 January 2022)
