= Alique =

Alique, Spain
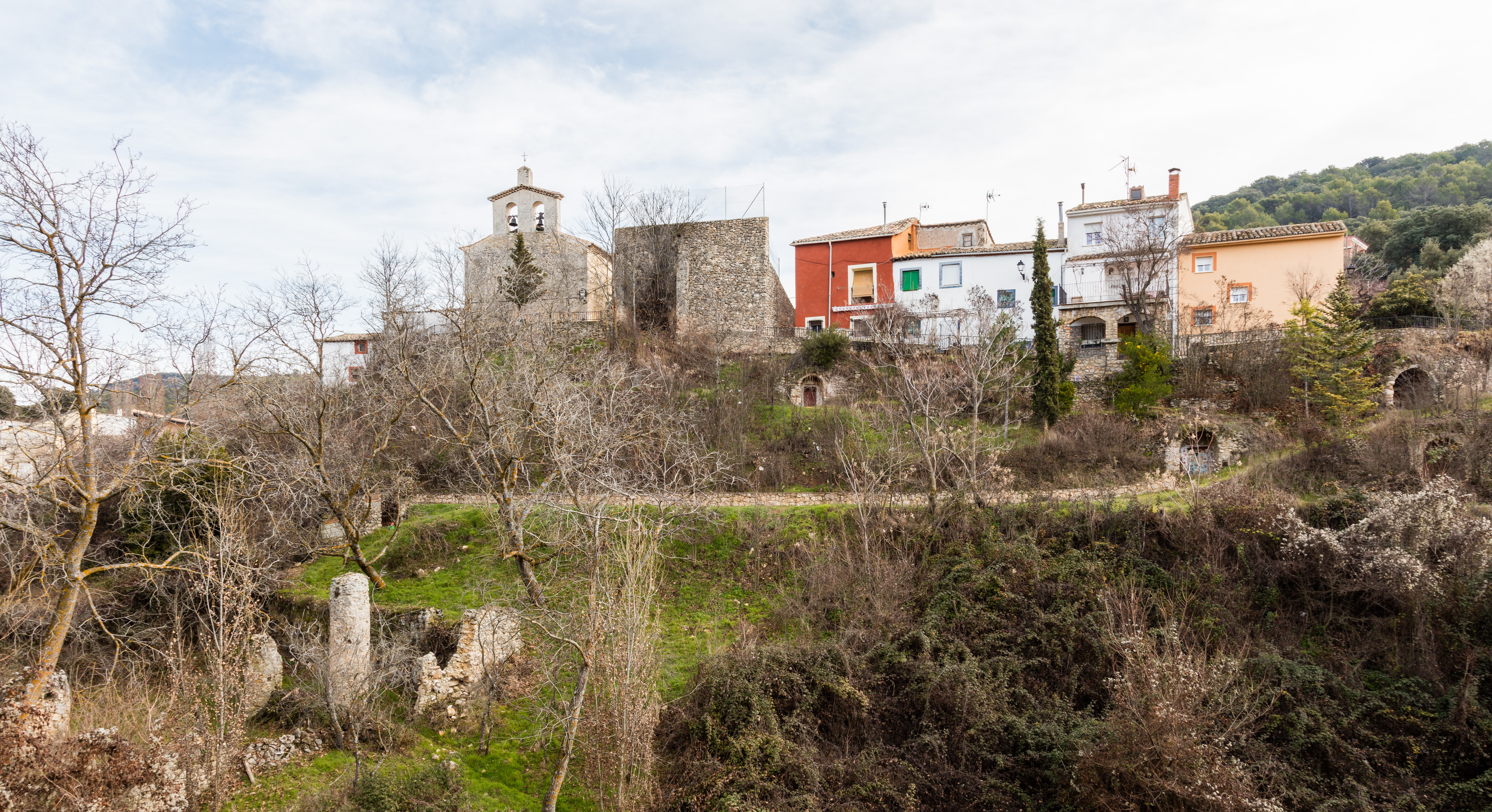

- Location in Spain Alique (Castilla-La Mancha) Alique (Spain)
- Coordinates: 40°35′15″N 2°38′33″W
- Country: Spain
- Autonomous community: Castile-La Mancha
- Province: Guadalajara
- Municipality: Alique

Area
  - Total: 10 km^{2} (3.9 sq mi)

Population (2025-01-01)
  - Total: 15
  - Density: 1.5/km^{2} (3.9/sq mi)
- Time zone: UTC+1 (CET)
  - Summer (DST): UTC+2 (CEST)

Alique is a municipality located in the province of Guadalajara, Castile-La Mancha, Spain. According to the 2004 census (INE), the municipality has a population of 36 inhabitants.
