= Jeneil Williams =

Jamaican fashion model

- Born: Kingston, Jamaica
- Partner: Shay Hunter
- Children: 1
- Modeling information
- Height: 1.77 m (5 ft 9 1/2 in)
- Hair color: Black
- Eye color: Brown
- Agency: IMG Models (New York, Paris); d' Management Group (Milan); Model Management (Hamburg); Select Model Management (Stockholm)

Jeneil Williams is a Jamaican fashion model.

== Career ==
Williams was discovered in a model search competition in Jamaica called Caribbean Model Search, in 2005; she subsequently signed with New York Models. In 2009, she appeared in a United Colors of Benetton campaign (with models including Constance Jablonski, Liu Wen, Simon Nessman, and Tao Okamoto) which led to Vogue editor-in-chief Anna Wintour requesting her for a photoshoot with photographer Mario Testino. She appeared in the July 2008 "all black issue" of Vogue Italia, featuring only black models. She has walked for Jonathan Saunders, Emanuel Ungaro, Loewe, Altuzarra, Balenciaga, Calvin Klein, Yeezy, Kenzo, Y-3, Fendi, Vivienne Westwood, John Galliano, Acne Studios, Zac Posen, Louis Vuitton, Reed Krakoff, Opening Ceremony, Lanvin, Catherine Malandrino, Carolina Herrera, L'Wren Scott, DVF. In 2010, with Gisele Bündchen and Miranda Kerr, Williams appeared in a triple cover series for i-D magazine. She has also modeled for Topshop, L'Oréal, Tom Ford Beauty, Nike, Inc., H&M, Gap, Inc., Coca-Cola, Jean Paul Gaultier, Jimmy Choo, Sephora, and Balenciaga.

== Personal life ==
Williams had her first child, a daughter, in autumn 2020. During her pregnancy she modelled for Nike's first maternity line.
