= Miguel Reveriego =

Spanish fashion photographer

- Born: Spain
- Occupation: fashion photographer

Miguel Reveriego is a Spanish fashion photographer

== Early life ==
Since he was 8 years old Reveriego had been obsessed with pictures of models and was very into movies as well. It was his first communion when he asked his parents for a camera though, he was not conscious at that age of what he wanted to do, but wanted to be like the movie directors or the photographers and just wanted that instrument ‘they had’.

== Photography career ==
Reveriego was in Madrid, assisting fashion photographers when Pop came out he became a fan of photographers Mert & Marcus, he wanted to go to London and ask for a job. It was very difficult since he didn't speak fluent English but after trying several times, going there over and over again, he got the job. Miguel met their first assistant at the moment and through her, he got an interview with them. At that time Mert & Marcus have just bought their house in Ibiza and they were looking for someone who could speak Spanish and it happened. What he attributes to that period of his career, it's how clear the concept of the woman was.
