= Nastasia Urbano =

Spanish model (born 1961

Natasia Urbano
- Born: 1961 (age 64–65); Switzerland
- Modeling information
- Height: 178 cm (5 ft 10 in)
- Hair color: Chestnut
- Eye color: Green
- Agency: Ford (1981)

Natasia Urbano is a former Spanish model. She was one of the most popular faces of the 80s with Green eyes and Chestnut hair, known for her defined cheek bones.

== Career ==
Urbano began her modeling career in Barcelona at the age of 20, leading to her signing with the Ford Modeling Agency in New York. Urbano appeared on the covers of various international magazines, including Vogue España in September 1981, and worked with fashion brands such as Armani and Loewe. She was the face of Yves Saint Laurent's Opium perfume. She was considered a top it girl at the height of her career. She was featured in Harper's Bazaar in December 1991.

During her career, Urbano reportedly earned substantial sums. However, by 2019, she was reported to be homeless, living on the streets of Barcelona. She attributed her situation to personal and financial difficulties.

In 2019, Urbano returned to modeling, participating in a photoshoot for El País Semanal.

== Covers ==
- September 1981 Vogue Espana
- March 1983 Annabella (magazine) (Italy)
- March/April 1989 Vogue Patterns (U.S.)
- March 1990 Flare (magazine) (Canada)
