= Emily DiDonato =

American model (born 1991)

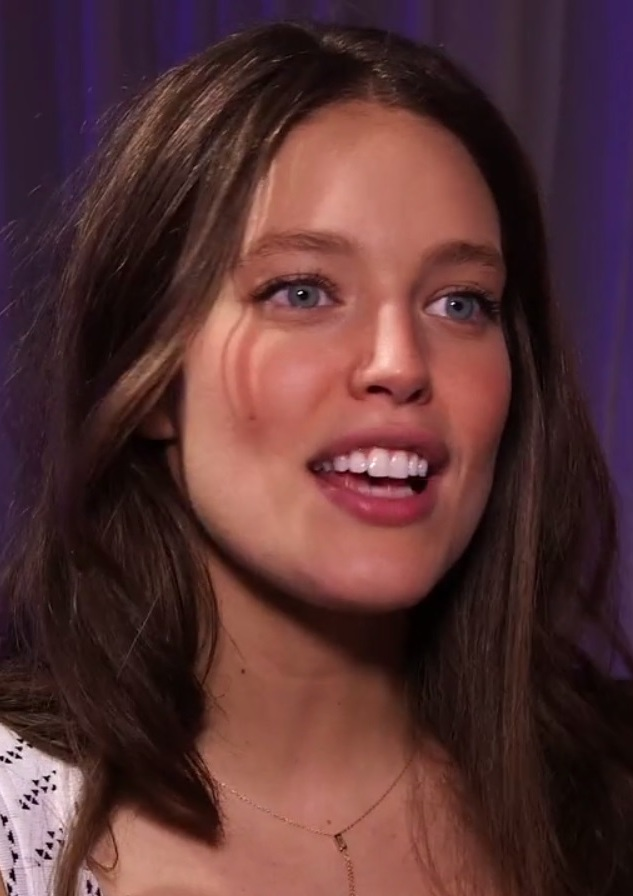
- DiDonato in 2016
- Born: February 24, 1991 (age 35); Goshen, New York, U.S.
- Occupation: Model
- Years active: 2009–present
- Spouse: Kyle Peterson (m. 2018)
- Children: 3
- Modeling information
- Height: 5 ft 10 in (1.78 m)
- Hair color: Brown
- Eye color: Blue
- Agency: IMG Models (Worldwide); Iconic Management (Berlin)

Emily DiDonato (born February 24, 1991) is an American model. She began her career in modeling at the age of 10 and has since worked with major brands such as Guess, Ralph Lauren, Maybeline New York, Giorgio Armani, L'Oreal and Oysho. She made her Sports Illustrated Swimsuit Issue debut in 2013.

== Early life ==
Born in Goshen, New York, DiDonato is of Italian, Irish, and Native American ancestry. Her great-grandparents emigrated to the U.S. from Italy.

== Career ==
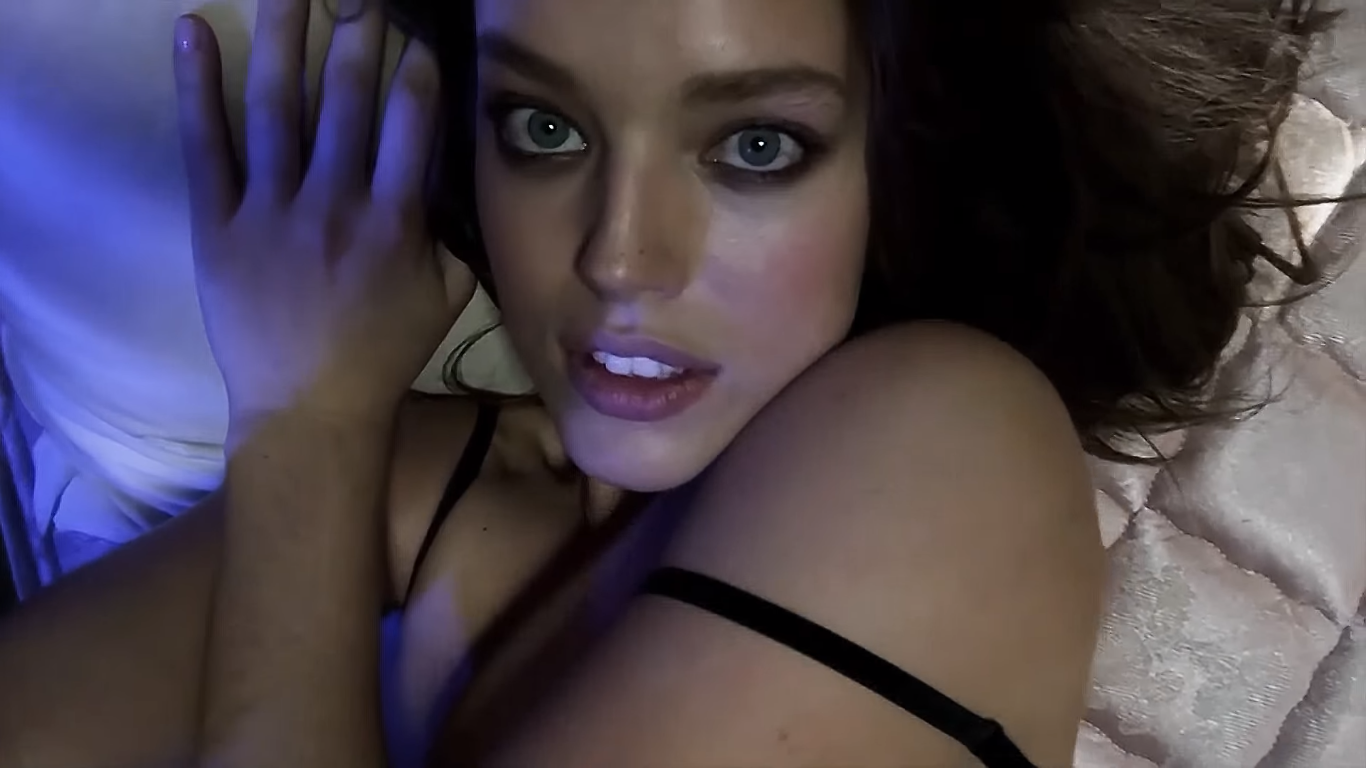
DiDonato for LOVE Advent 2014

DiDonato signed with ReQuest Model Management in 2008 and booked several major campaigns for the following year, including Guess, Ralph Lauren's "Rugby" ad campaign, and Maybelline New York. Having just graduated from high school with only a few months of modeling experience, she made her television commercial debut for Maybelline's "Color Sensational Lip Color" line, alongside Christy Turlington, Jessica White, and Julia Stegner. DiDonato began modeling for Victoria's Secret in August 2009 and appeared on her first magazine cover with The Block's October 2009 issue.

Prior to the 2009 New York Fashion Week, Vogue Germany dubbed her "top newcomer".

In 2010, she became the face of Giorgio Armani's fragrance Acqua Di Gioia. Images of her from this campaign were used on the cover pages of L'Oréal's Annual and Financial Reports for 2010. For summer 2013, DiDonato starred in an advertising campaign for Oysho.

She made her Sports Illustrated Swimsuit Issue debut in 2013, with photos taken in Namibia.

DiDonato has walked for Chanel, Balmain, Givenchy, rag+bone, Louis Vuitton, Loewe, and Giles Deacon. She has appeared in advertising campaigns for Miu Miu, Oscar de la Renta, Giorgio Armani, Calvin Klein, Trussardi, Ralph Lauren, Just Cavalli, Missoni, Elie Tahari, Longchamp, Nicole Farhi, Aldo, Gap, Juicy Couture, and Guess.

== Personal life ==
DiDonato began dating Jake Gyllenhaal in 2013. She married financier Kyle Peterson on June 23, 2018. She gave birth to a daughter on November 23, 2021, and gave birth to a son on April 27, 2023. In August 2024, she revealed that she had miscarried, at eight weeks, earlier that year. A year later in December 22, 2025, she shared that she was again expecting her third child. DiDonato announced through her TikTok that she gave birth to her third child, a son, on May 29, 2026.
