= Heather Stewart-Whyte =

British model (born 1968)

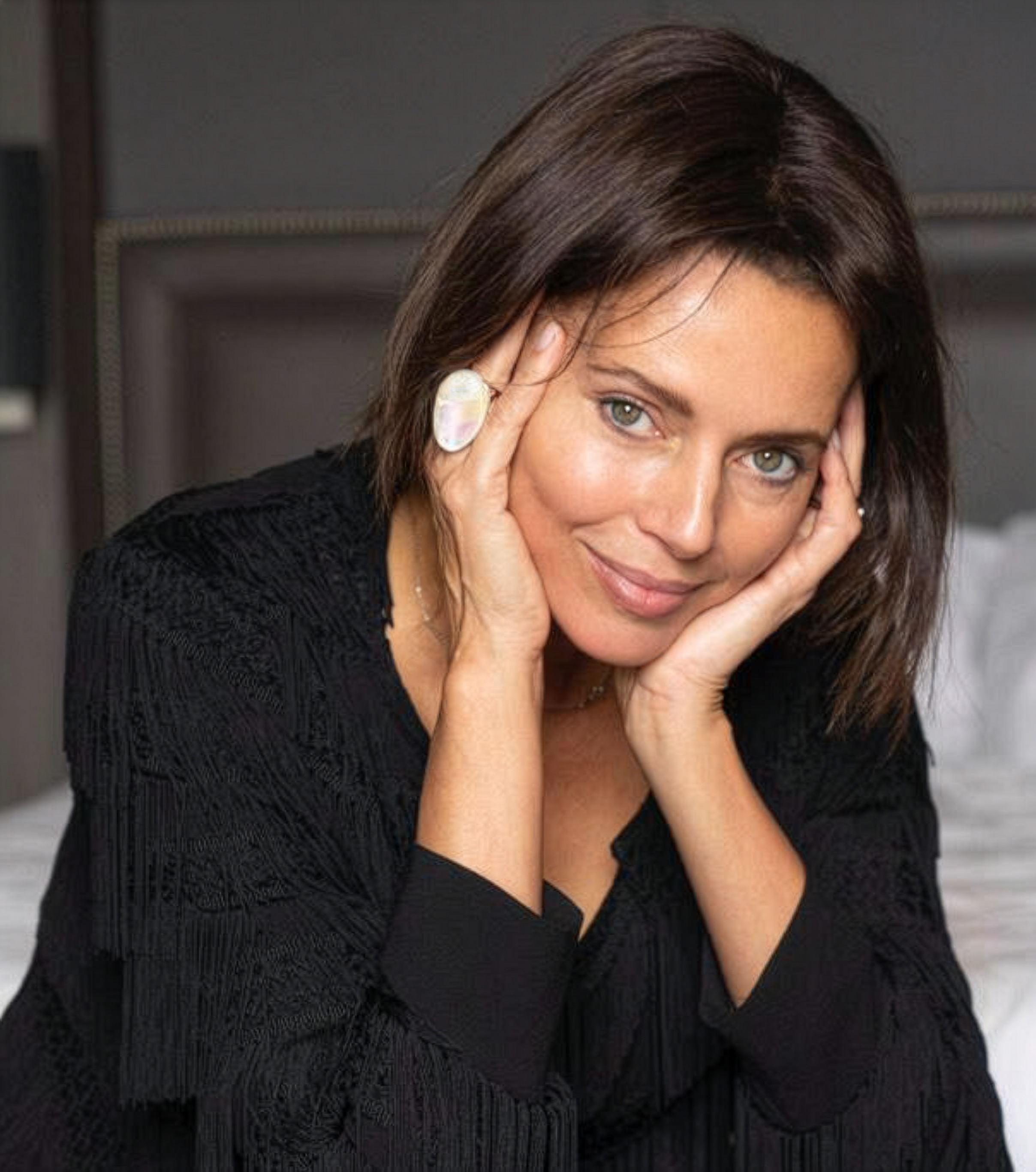
- Born: 25 September 1968 (age 58); East Sussex, England
- Occupation: Model
- Years active: 1985–present
- Spouses: Yannick Noah (m. 1995; div. 1999) Dan Koonoo (m. 2001; died 2004)
- Children: 3
- Modelling information
- Height: 5 ft 11 in (180 cm)
- Hair colour: Brown
- Eye colour: Green
- Agency: Models 1

Heather Stewart-Whyte (born 25 September 1968) is a British model.

== Early life and career ==
Born in East Sussex, England, Heather Stewart-Whyte is the daughter of Doug Stewart-Whyte, a Conservative Party election agent, but was raised, along with her sisters, by her mother. She became a nanny but, at age 17, got her first modelling job by replying to an ad by Elite Model Management. In the late 1980s and early 1990s, Stewart-Whyte performed runway shows for, among others, Versace, Armani, Saint-Laurent and Lagerfeld, and modeled for Victoria's Secret, Gucci, Christian Dior, and Maybelline. She also appeared on magazine covers such as Vogue Paris in 1991 and 1992, and the British and Italian editions of both Elle and Marie Claire and French Elle.

== Personal life ==
Stewart-Whyte married French tennis player Yannick Noah in 1995. They divorced in 1999.

In 2017, her daughter Jenaye Noah became a model.
