= Esther Cañadas =

Spanish model (born 1977)

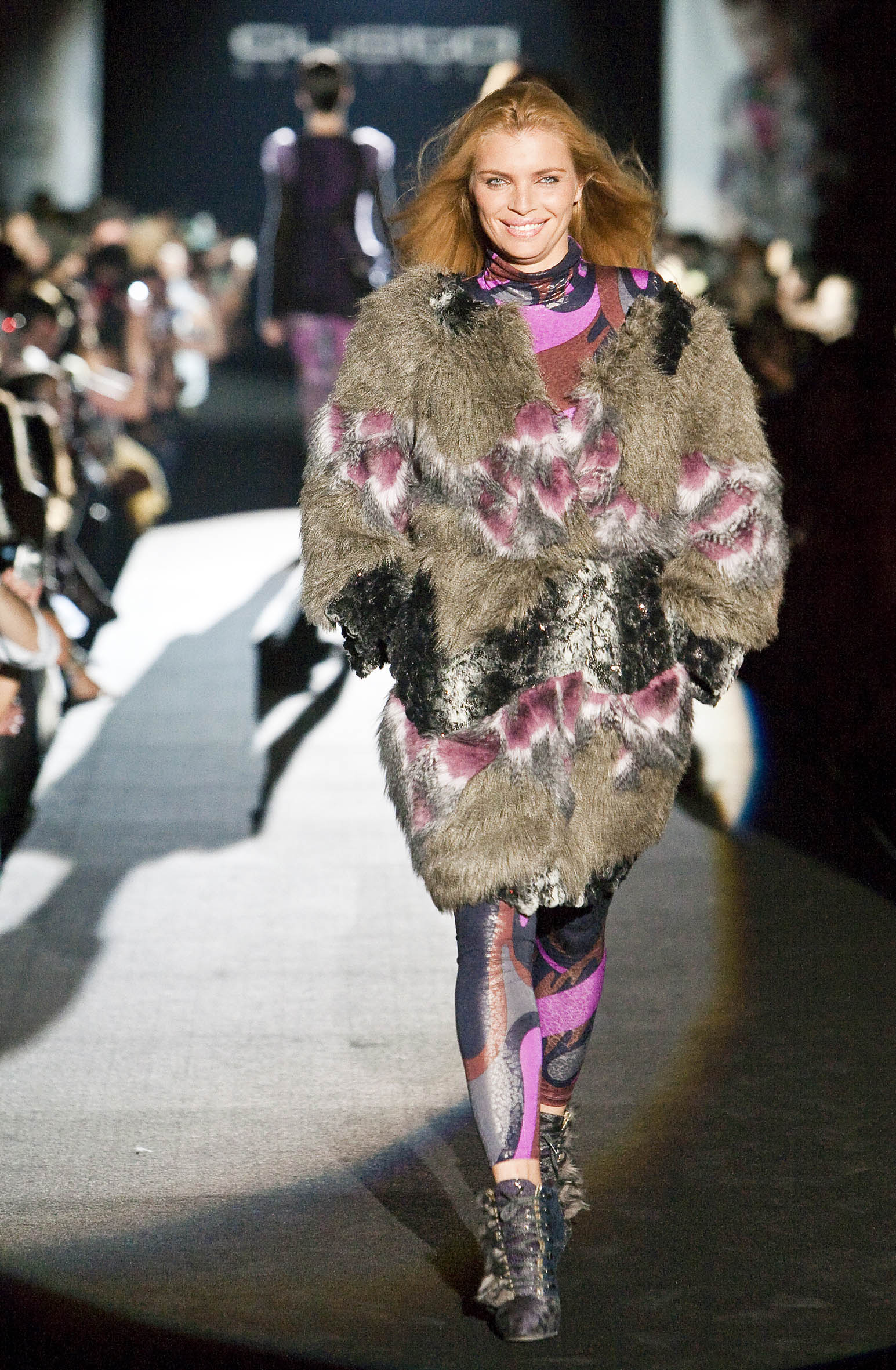
- Esther Cañadas at 2010 The Brandery show
- Born: 1 March 1977 (age 49); Albacete, Spain
- Spouses: Mark Vanderloo (m. 1999; div. 2000) Sete Gibernau (m. 2007; div. 2008)
- Children: 1
- Modeling information
- Height: 1.78 m (5 ft 10 in)
- Hair color: Dark blond
- Eye color: Blue
- Agency: d'management group (Milan)

Esther Cañadas (Spanish pronunciation: [esˈteɾ kaˈɲaðas]; born 1 March 1977, in Albacete) is a Spanish model and actress. In 2024, the website Models.com added her to its list of Industry Icons, a term it applies to models "who have built stellar careers", ranking her higher than its Industry Legends category but lower than its Supermodels.

== Career ==
Originally, Cañadas wanted to pursue a career as a criminologist, but her mother persuaded her to give modeling a try. In her teens she started working as a model and moved first to Barcelona, then to Milan and New York.

Cañadas has walked the catwalk for many designers, including Chloé, Gucci, Dolce & Gabbana, Versace, Chanel, Michael Kors, Calvin Klein, Alexander McQueen, Yves Saint Laurent, Valentino, Moschino, Custo Barcelona and Givenchy

She has been featured on the cover of the most prestigious international fashion magazines like Vogue, Harper's Bazaar, Marie Claire to name a few. She has worked with the "who's who" of top photographers in the fashion industry, including: Steven Meisel, Helmut Newton, Peter Lindbergh, Richard Avedon, Ellen Von Unwerth, Herb Ritts.

In 1997, she walked the Victoria's Secret fashion show.

In 1999, she appeared in the action/romance film The Thomas Crown Affair.

== Personal life ==
Cañadas met her first husband, model Mark Vanderloo, on the set of a DKNY photoshoot in 1997. They married in 1999 and were divorced in 2000.

In December 2014, Cañadas gave birth to a daughter, Galia.

== Filmography ==
- The Thomas Crown Affair (1999)
- Enslavement: The True Story of Fanny Kemble (2000, TV movie)
- Torrente 2: Misión en Marbella (2001)
- Trileros (2003)
