= Inés Sastre =

Spanish model and actress

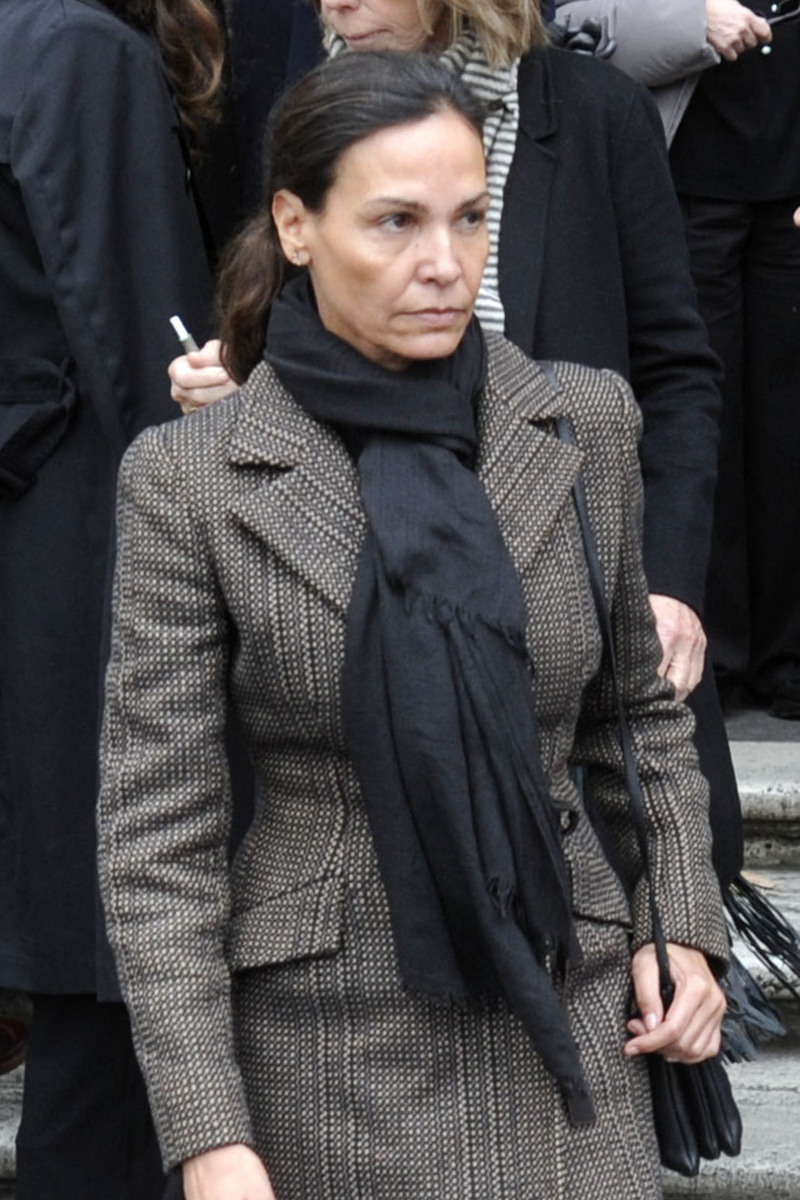
- Inés Sastre in Rome (2024)
- Born: Inés Sastre Moratón; 21 November 1973 (age 52); Valladolid, Castile and León, Spain
- Occupations: actress, model
- Known for: The Lost City as Aurora Fellove

Inés Sastre Moratón (born 21 November 1973) is a Spanish model and actress.

== Biography ==
On November 21, 1973 (52 years ago), Sastre was born in Valladolid.

In 1985, at the age of 12, Sastre's career started when she was selected for a McDonald's fast-food commercial.

In 1988, Sastre first film appearance was in El Dorado (1988) by Carlos Saura.

In 1989, Sastre was awarded the Look of the Year by the Elite Model Agency group. Although offered a career in modelling at the time, she chose to continue her studies instead.

Sastre studied at The Sorbonne in Paris. In addition to Spanish, she speaks French, English and Italian fluently.

In 1996, Sastre succeeded Isabella Rossellini as Lancôme's spokesmodel for its perfume Trésor.

In 1997, before playing the role of Francesca Babini in Italian director Pupi Avati's movie The Best Man (1998), Sastre became the Beauté Naturelle for having won the Prix de la mode in Paris' Fashion Awards. Over the following years, she worked with UNESCO and took part in a multitude of fashion design shows, as well as appearing in numerous ads.

In 2000, Sastre achieved popularity in Italy as a presenter with Fabio Fazio at the Italian Music Festival di Sanremo.

In 2006, Sastre married Alexandro Corrias and together they had a son, Diego. A little over a year later, they mutually filed for divorce.

Sastre has been a UNICEF ambassador.

Sastre enjoys golf and has played in the Gary Player Invitational charity pro-am several times in South Africa to help raise funds for needy children.

== Magazine covers ==
Ines has appeared on many international magazine front covers:

- ¡Hola!
- Blanco y Negro (Spain)
- Cosmopolitan
- Elle
- ES
- Femme
- GQ
- Linea
- Luna (Germany)
- Marie Claire
- Red (UK)
- Rolling Stone
- Telva
- Vogue
- Woman

== Filmography ==
- 1988 El Dorado
- 1988 Joan of Arc of Mongolia
- 1990 Flight from Paradise
- 1995 Beyond the Clouds
- 1995 Faire un film pour moi c'est vivre (documentary)
- 1995 Sabrina
- 1997 The Best Man
- 1998 The Count of Monte Cristo
- 1999 Un amor de Borges
- 2001 Druids
- 2001 Torrente 2: Mission in Marbella
- 2001 Vidocq
- 2003 Io No
- 2003 Volpone
- 2003 Variaciones 1/113
- 2005 The Lost City
- 2007 A Dinner for Them to Meet

== Honours ==
- Dame ("Chevalier") of the Ordre des Arts et des Lettres (21 November 2013).

== See also ==
- Almudena Fernandez
- Ana Alvarez
- Castilian people
- Judit Mascó
- Natalia Estrada

== Bibliography ==
- Inés Sastre at ECI (Entertainment Creative Interface) Global Talent Management
