= Marina Pérez =

Spanish model (born 1984)

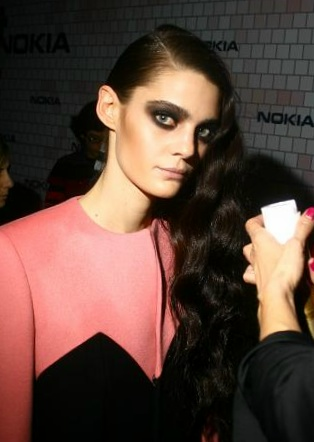
- Pérez backstage in 2008
- Born: Marina Carolina Pérez; July 31, 1984 (age 42); Madrid, Spain
- Modeling information
- Height: 1.76 m (5 ft 9 in)
- Hair color: Brown
- Eye color: Blue
- Agency: Traffic Models

Marina Carolina Pérez (born July 31, 1984) is a Spanish model. She has been the face of Jimmy Choo, Alessandro Dell'Acqua, Prada, Pucci, Moschino, Giorgio Armani, St. John, and Marc Jacobs.

== Early life and career ==
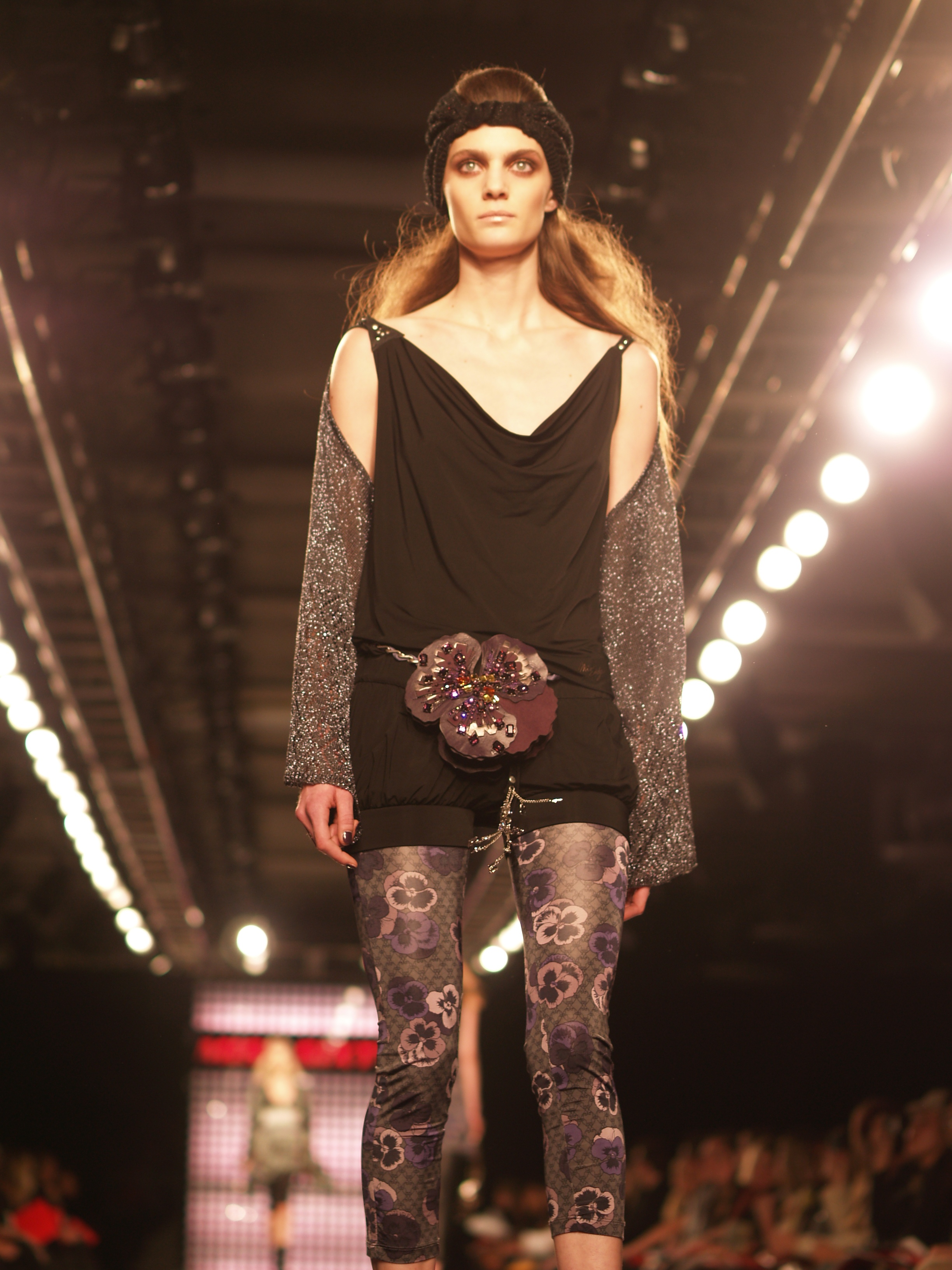
On the runway for Miss Sixty, Fall 2007 in New York Fashion Week

Encouraged by her mother, Pérez began modeling at the age of 11 posing for catalogs and ads. She made her catwalk debut at the fall Madrid runway for Miguel Palacio, and appeared on her first magazine cover, for Spanish Elle. Recognition came when she was presented with the L'Oréal modeling award at the Cibeles Madrid Fashion Week and since then she has not stopped working.

A break into fashion at the international level came in late 2001 after she moved to New York at age 18. In September 2003, she debuted in New York Fashion Week for Betsey Johnson. The New York Magazine reported that Pérez commanded over $8,000 per runway show in 2004 and, it was said she earned €5,000 for the Milan shows. Her runway credentials include walking for designers: Christian Dior, Louis Vuitton, Yves Saint Laurent, Alexander McQueen, Chloé, Givenchy, Prada, Balenciaga, Miu Miu, Lanvin, Dolce & Gabbana, Dries van Noten, Rick Owens, Rodarte, Marni, Gucci, Thakoon, and Nina Ricci in New York, London, Milan and Paris. She has opened shows for Proenza Schouler and Christopher Kane. Pérez has worked with high-calibre photographers such as Steven Meisel, Inez and Vinoodh, Mert and Marcus, and Patrick Demarchelier.

She has been on the cover of such magazines as Vogue, Dazed & Confused, Numéro and 10 Magazine. She has appeared on the cover of Italian Vogue and three times on Spanish Vogue. In 2008 she replaced Angelina Jolie as one of the faces of St. John alongside Hilary Rhoda and Caroline Winberg.

Her younger sister Carla is also a model. Pérez has a tattoo on the inside of her right wrist. Her natural hair color is blonde.
