= Madrid Fashion Week =

Spanish fashion catwalk

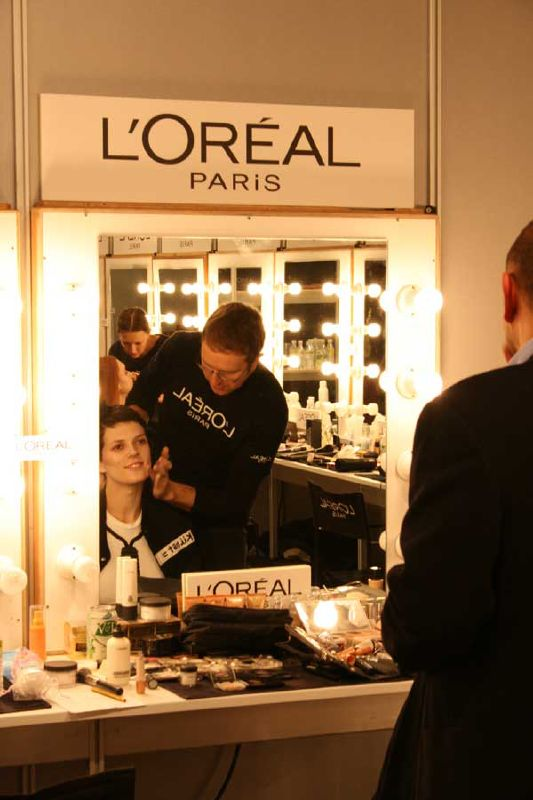
Backstage at Cibeles Madrid Fashion Week.

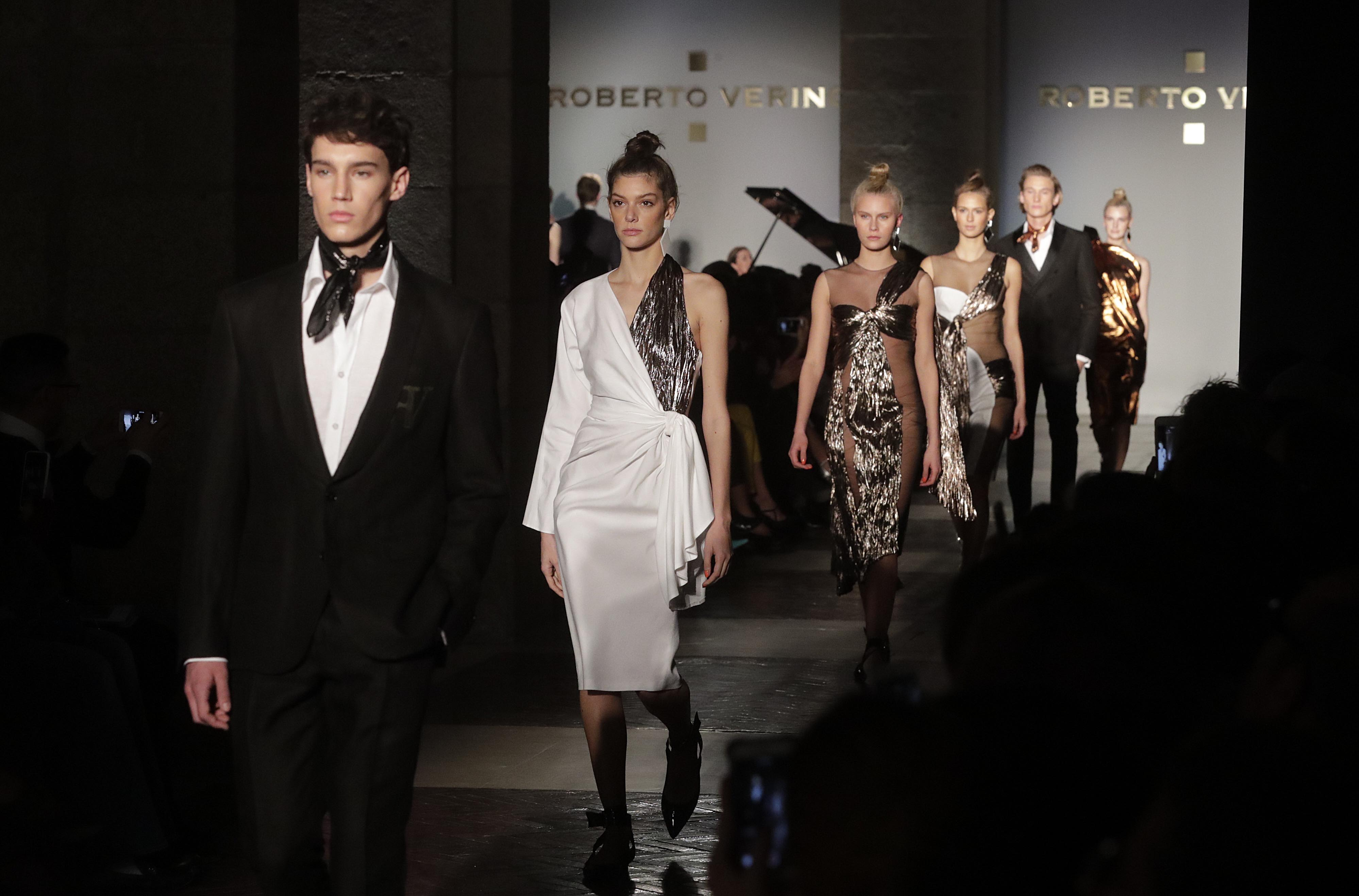
Mercedes-Benz Fashion Week Madrid 2017.

Mercedes-Benz Fashion Week Madrid, was known as Pasarela Cibeles until 2008 or Cibeles Madrid Fashion week up until 2012, is the principal platform to promote fashion in Spain. Based in Madrid and often takes place twice a year, in September 2008 held its edition No. 48. The No. 49 edition, which lasted two weeks, was held in February 2009. It is organized by IFEMA, the trade fair in Madrid. In the edition organized for September 18, 2009 they celebrate the 50th edition of the former Pasarela Cibeles.

Some of the notable attendees at MBFWM are Spain's Duchess of Alba, socialite and tabloid fixture Carmen Lomana, French socialite Beatrice D'Orleans, Russian model Irina Shayk, and athletes like Cristiano Ronaldo, Sergio Ramos, Kaka, Higuain, Ozil and Figo.

Some designers that showed their collections included: Davidelfin, Juan Duyos, Adolfo Dominguez, Andres Sarda, Aristocrazy, TCN and Juanjo Oliva.
