= List of Numéro China cover models =

This list of Numéro China cover models is a catalog of cover models who have appeared on the cover of the Chinese edition of Numéro magazine, starting with the magazine's first issue in September 2010.

== 2010s ==
=== 2010 ===
Issue	Cover model	Photographer
#1. September	Liu Wen	Tiziano Magni
#2. October	Grace Gao	Tiziano Magni
#3. November	Sasha Pivovarova	Greg Kadel
#4. December	Dafne Cejas	Greg Kadel

=== 2011 ===
Issue	Cover model	Photographer
#5. January/February	Du Juan	Yuan Gui Mei
#6. March	Liu Wen	Kai Z. Feng
#7. April	Fan Bing Bing	Tiziano Magni
#8. May	Edie Campbell	Tiziano Magni
#9. June/July	Du Juan	Tiziano Magni
#10. August	Edita Vilkevičiūtė	Kai Z. Feng
#11. September	Constance Jablonski; Liu Wen	Tiziano Magni
#12. October	Liya Kebede	Tiziano Magni
#13. November	Ming Xi	Claus Wickrath
#14. December	Doutzen Kroes	Tiziano Magni

=== 2012 ===
Issue	Cover model	Photographer
#15. January/February	Xiaomeng Huang	Yin Chao
#16. March	Tatiana Cotliar	Tiziano Magni
#17. April	Xiao Wen Ju	Tiziano Magni
#18. May	Xiaomeng Huang	Yin Chao
#19. June/July	Xiao Wen Ju	Tiziano Magni
#20. August	Sara Blomqvist	Tiziano Magni
#21. September	Carolyn Murphy	Tiziano Magni
#22. October	Xiaomeng Huang	Tiziano Magni
#23. November	Xiaomeng Huang	Tiziano Magni
#24. December	Enikő Mihalik	Gianluca Fontana

=== 2013 ===
Issue	Cover model	Photographer
#25. January	Abigaile Ge	Yin Chao
#26. February	Tatjana Patitz	Phillip Dixon
#27. March	Xiaomeng Huang	Tiziano Magni
#28. April	Ruoyang He	Li Zi
#29. May	Anna Ewers & Keke Lindgard	Ellen von Unwerth
#30. June/July	Zhang Ziyi	Yin Chao
#31. August	Guinevere Van Seenus	Txema Yeste
#32. September	Tao Okamoto	Daniel Sannwald
#33. October	Kirsten Owen	Anthony Maule
#34. November	Toni Garrn	Txema Yeste
#35. December	Sung Hee Kim	Benjamin Lennox

=== 2014 ===
Issue	Cover model	Photographer
#36. January/February	Marine Deleeuw	Bruno Staub
#37. March	Tess Hellfeuer	Txema Yeste
#38. April	Guinevere Van Seenus	Sofia Sanchez & Mauro Mongiello
#39. May	Nika Cole	Katerina Jebb
#40. June/July	Lexi Boling	Laurie Bartley
#41. August	Auguste Abeliunaite	Sofia Sanchez & Mauro Mongiello
#42. September	Liu Wen	Txema Yeste
#43. October	Jamie Bochert	Txema Yeste
#44. November	Meghan Collison	Sofia Sanchez & Mauro Mongiello
#45. December/January	Zhao Wei; Lina Berg	Emma Tempest

=== 2015 ===
Issue	Cover model	Photographer
#46. February	Nataša Vojnović	Txema Yeste
#47. March	Maria Veranen	Laurie Bartley
#48. April	Jessica Stam	Sofia Sanchez & Mauro Mongiello
#49. May	Zhou Xun	Katerina Jebb
#50. June/July	Nastya Sten	Txema Yeste
#51. August	Avery Blanchard	Sofia Sanchez & Mauro Mongiello
#52. September	Annika Krijt	Laurie Bartley
#53. October	Lia Pavlova	Sofia Sanchez & Mauro Mongiello
#54. November	Heather Kemesky	Txema Yeste
#55. December/January	Kadri Vahersalu	Sofia Sanchez & Mauro Mongiello

=== 2016 ===
Issue	Cover model	Photographer
#56. February	Drake Burnette	Dario Catellani
#57. March	Agnes Nieske Abma	Sofia Sanchez & Mauro Mongiello
#58. April	Pooja Mor	Txema Yeste
#59. May/June	Lina Hoss	Miles Aldridge
#60. July	Tina Veshaguri	Sofia Sanchez & Mauro Mongiello
#61. August	Doona Bae	Hong Jang Hyun
#62. September	Hayett McCarthy	Ben Grieme
#63. October	Sora Choi	Ren Hang
#64. November	Hannah Elyse Burke	Sofia Sanchez & Mauro Mongiello
#65. December	Du Juan	Trunk Xu

=== 2017 ===
Issue	Cover model	Photographer
#66. February	Ellen de Weer	Horst Diekgerdes
#67. March	Guinevere Van Seenus	Sofia Sanchez & Mauro Mongiello
#68. April	Lottie Moss	Sofia Sanchez & Mauro Mongiello
#69. May	Jess Cole	Janneke van der Hagen
#70. June/July	Shujing Zhou	Yu Cong
#71. August	Jessie Li	Luo Yang
#72. September	Lily Nova	Sofia Sanchez & Mauro Mongiello
#73. October	Kim van der Laan	Janneke van der Hagen
#74. November	Vanessa Paradis	Paola Kudacki
#75. December	Radhika Nair	Nhu Xuan Hua

=== 2018 ===
Issue	Cover model	Photographer
#76. February	Lorna Foran	Katja Mayer
#76. February	Vivien Li Meng	Nina Gawamika
#77. March	Zhong Chuxi	Yu Cong
#78. April	Zhou Dongyu	Joyce Ng
#79. May	Hirschy Grace	Janneke van der Hagen
#79. May	Jamily Meurer	Alice Rosati
#80. June/July	Unia Pakhomova	Theo Liu
#81. August	Chu Wong	Sofia Sanchez & Mauro Mongiello
#81. August	Lexie Liu	Lin Zhi Peng
#82. September	Finn Buchanan	Sofia Sanchez & Mauro Mongiello
#82. September	Xie Chaoyu	Yu Cong
#83. October	Iekeliene Stange	Janneke van der Hagen
#84. November	Rose Daniels	Sofia Sanchez & Mauro Mongiello
#85. November	Ilona Desmet	Sofia Sanchez & Mauro Mongiello

=== 2019 ===
Issue	Cover model	Photographer
#86. January/February	Aaliyah Hydes	Suzie & Léo
#86. January/February	Irene Guarenas	Janneke van der Hagen
#87. March	Fernanda Ly	Janneke van der Hagen
#88. April	Gisele Fox	Erwan Frotin
#89. May	Julianne Moore	Erik Madigan Heck
#90. June/July	Haowen Pan	David Vasiljevic
#90. June/July	Chu Wong	David Vasiljevic
#91. August	Vicky Chen	Pixy Liao
#92. September	Edwina Preston	Janneke van der Hagen
#92. September	Chun Jin; Tang He	Lin Zhipeng
#92. September	Chen Man	Chen Man
#93. October	Lucan Gillespie	Anthony Seklaoui
#94. December	Alma Jodorowsky	Virginie Khateeb
#94. December	Xiao Wen Ju	Jumbo Tsui
#94. December	Gayoung & Paik	Cho Gi-seok

== 2020s ==
=== 2020 ===
Issue	Cover model	Photographer
#95. January/February	Lina Zhang	Yu Cong
#96. March	Hayley Ashton	Sofia Sanchez & Mauro Mongiello
#96. March	Jess Maybury	Janneke van der Hagen
#97. April	Jiali Zhao	Zeng Wu
#98. May	He Cong	Jumbo Tsui
#99. June/July	New Pants	Jumbo Tsui
#99. June/July	Charlotte Cardin	Charlotte Cardin
#99. June/July	Lauv	Jumbo Tsui
#99. June/July	Dani Miller	Jumbo Tsui
#99. June/July	Tame Impala	Kate Green & Sophie Lawrence Parker
#100. August	Zhou Dongyu	Mei Yuan Gui
#101. September	Haowen Pan; Chun Jin; Ruiqi Jiang; Tang He; Shuping Li	Trunk Xu
#103. December	Chu Wong	Wing Shya

=== 2021 ===
Issue	Cover model	Photographer
#104. Spring	Marion Cotillard	Camille Vivier
#104. Spring	Lina Zhang	Feng Li
#104. Spring	Myung Su Jung	Erwan Frotin
#105. Autumn	Jessie Li	Luo Yang
#105. Autumn	Raw Xu	Wang Liang
#105. Autumn	Chen Zhuo	Chen Zhuo

=== 2022 ===
Issue	Cover model	Photographer
#106. Spring	Yilan Hua	Christopher Anderson
#106. Spring	Mao Xiaoxing	Daniel Riera
#106. Spring	Natalie Prabha	Zhong Lin
#106. Spring	Paul Dano	Eric Chakeen
#107. Autumn	Xiao Wen Ju	Zeng Wu
#107. Autumn	Jiali Zhao	Lan Tian Sky
#107. Autumn	Aweng Chuol	Zac Bayly

=== 2023 ===
Issue	Cover model	Photographer
#108. Spring	Tilda Swinton	Casper Sejersen
#108. Spring	Du Juan	Leslie Zhang
#109. Autumn	Jean Campbell	Drew Jarrett
#109. Autumn	Hyun Ji Shin	Camille Vivier
#109. Autumn	Huang Shixin; Wang Langqi; Zhang Wenhui; Gu Haizhu; Yang Xue; Yu Xinzhuo	Oscar Chik

=== 2024 ===
Issue	Cover model	Photographer
#110. Spring	Xin Zhilei	Camille Vivier
#110. Spring	Marion Barbeau	Annie Lai
#110. Spring	Chang Chunxiao	Feng Li
#111. Autumn	Jiang Qiming	Leslie Zhang
#111. Autumn	Xiao Wen Ju	Suffo Moncloa
#111. Autumn	Sharon Eyal	Christopher Anderson

=== 2025 ===
Issue	Cover model	Photographer
#112. Spring	Lily-Rose Depp	Pierre-Ange Carlotti
#112. Spring	Zhou Xun	Wing Shya
#113. Autumn	Kristine Lindseth	Annie Lai
#113. Autumn	Erin O'Connor	Drew Jarrett
