= Luis Venegas (publisher) =

Spanish magazine publisher

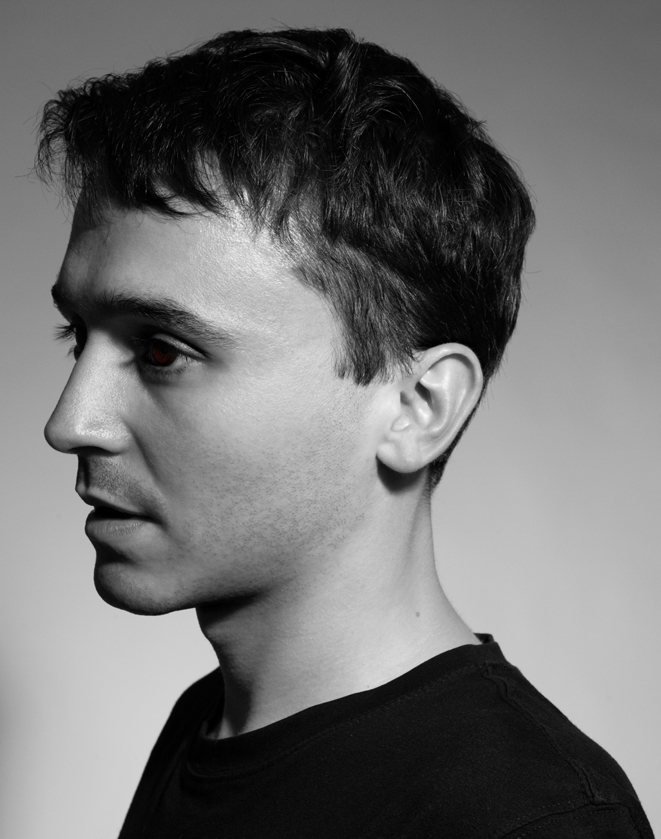
- Portrait of Luis Venegas
- Occupations: Creative Director, editor, publisher

Luis Venegas is a Spanish editor and publisher of five independent, limited edition magazines: Fanzine137, EY! Magateen, Candy, The Printed Dog and EY! Boy. He is also a creative director who has worked with luxury brands such as Loewe, Acne, Carolina Herrera and J.W.Anderson.

“Just when everyone was preparing for fashion print publishing’s dying breath, Luis Venegas has reacquainted the industry with its love of hard-to-find magazines. Produced in severely limited editions, his labours of love Fanzine137, EY! and Candy (...) prove that fashion publishing has a healthy future if it serves a niche of fellow enthusiasts.”

— Murray Healy, The New Creative Establishment, Interview Magazine 2010

== Early career ==
Luis' career started in Paris in 1996 when he was working as a designer for Thierry Mugler. In 1999, he moved to Madrid to work for Spanish fashion designer Sybilla as Creative Director of Communications until 2005.

== Fanzine137 ==
In 2004, the first issue of Fanzine137 was born, with a limited edition run of 1,137 copies. The magazine is a collection of Luis Venegas’ objects of attraction at the specific time of publication.

Every issue is unique in size, theme, materials, layout and graphic design changes.

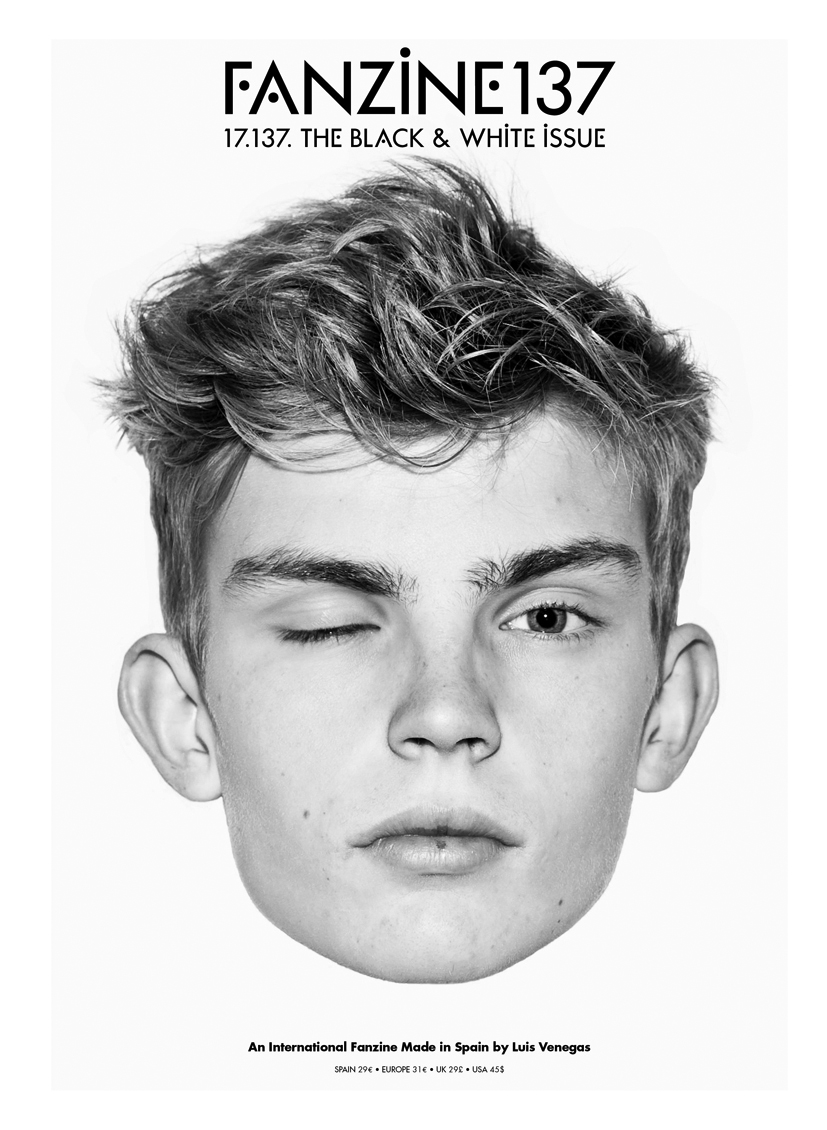
Cover of Fanzine 17.137 The Black And White Issue with Timothy Kelleher shot by Thomas Giddings

The list of contributors of Fanzine137 has included Steven Klein, Terry Richardson, Alasdair McLellan, Ryan McGinley, Christian Lacroix, Javier Vallhonrat, Tom Ford, Rodarte, Richard Prince, Tim Walker, Larry Clark, Gus Van Sant, plus interviews with Linda Evangelista, Bruce Weber, Juergen Teller, Carolina Herrera, Joe McKenna, Grace Coddington and Oliver Zahm among others. It has also posthumously presented portfolios by photographers such as Richard Avedon, Helmut Newton, Herb Ritts and Francesco Scavullo.

Issue	Date	Title
1.137	September 2004	Anything Goes
3.137	May 2005	Corps Et Âme
5.137	May 2006	Heartbeats Accelerating
7.137	October 2006	The Sweet & Subtle Issue
9.137	April 2007	Unforgettable Faces
11.137	November 2007	We Are The World
13.137	June 2008	Ladies & Gentlemen (Vol.1)
15.137	March 2009	Ladies & Gentlemen (Vol.2)
17.137	May 2011	The Black & White Issue

== EY! Magateen ==
Venegas launched his second magazine, EY! Magateen in Spring 2008. The magazine was originally called Electric Youth!. The title of the magazine makes homage to Debbie Gibson’s 1989 song Electric Youth, taken from the album with the same name.

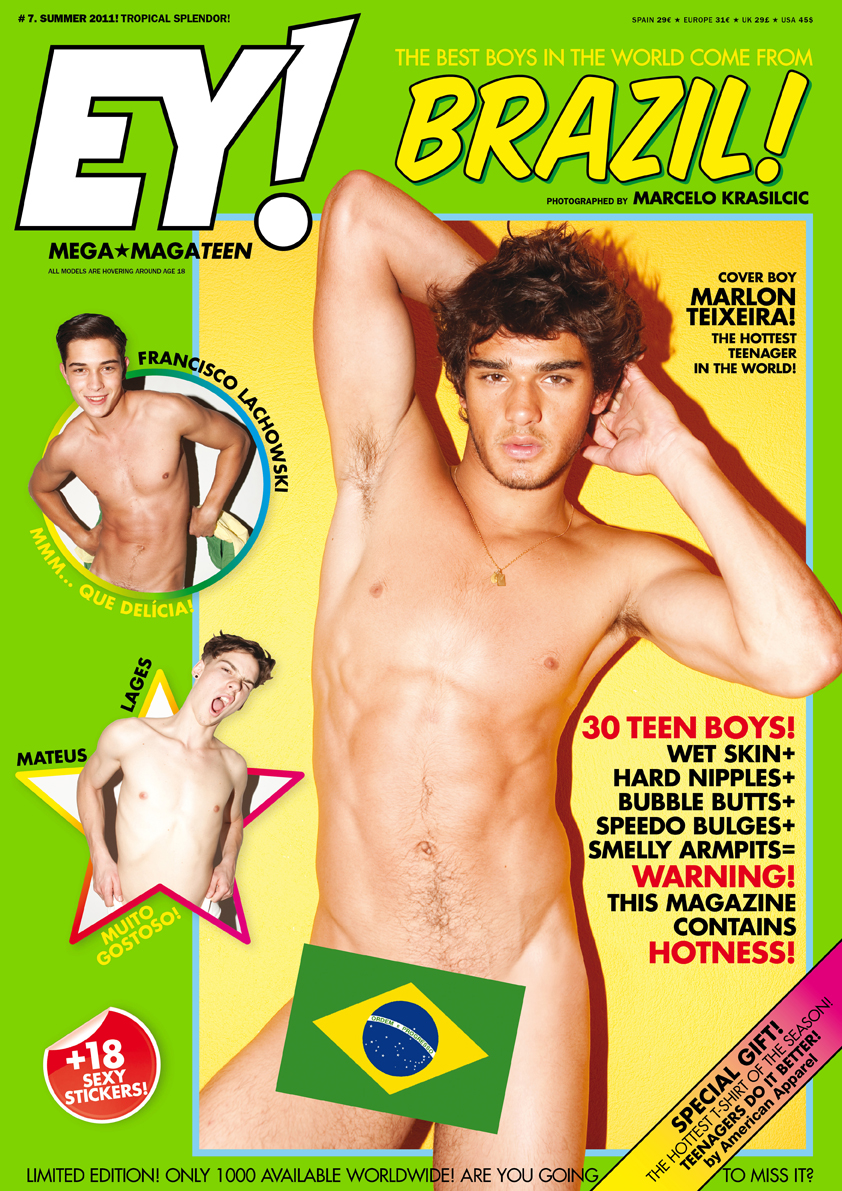
Cover of EY Magateen Brazil issue 7 with Marlon Teixeria shot by Marcelo Krasilcic

EY! Magateen addresses the energy, power and vitality of young males, most of them aged between 16 and 21 years. Each new issue is about a specific country or a city and is limited to just 1000 copies. The group of young people on display in EY! Magateen is a mix of handsome unknowns: mostly models, emerging artists, actors and athletes. The magazine features quirky comments and suggestive nudity.

Issues 6, 7 and 8 featured collaborations with American Apparel.

Issue	Date	Title
1	Spring 2008	Spain by Daniel Riera
2	Fall 2008	United Kingdom by Alasdair McLellan
3	Winter 2008-2009	USA West Coast by Doug Inglish
4	Spring-Summer 2009	Argenteena by Steven Klein
5	Winter 2009-2010	Germany by Kira Bunse
6	Summer 2010	New Kids On The World
7	Summer 2011	Brazil by Marcelo Krasilcic
8	Summer 2012	Spain by Xevi Muntané
9	Spring 2014	New York by Steven Klein

== Candy ==
Venegas’ third magazine, Candy was launched in October 2009. According to its slogan it is The First Transversal Style Magazine. Following the tradition of his other two magazines, Candy has an exclusive limited edition run of 1500 copies. It is a fashion and art magazine completely dedicated to celebrating transvestism, trans-sexuality, crossdressing and androgyny. The title of the magazine makes homage to Candy Darling.

Unlike other publications related to the LGBT community, which generally advocate for rights form a political standpoint, Candy stands out as a celebration of this lifestyle. For Venegas, “Candy isn't about rights, but I do think the fact it [Candy] exists helps.” In an interview with The New York Times, Venegas made his statement clear:

“Gay magazines talk about the rights of gay people and the achievements of the gay movement […] I didn’t want Candy to be like that. I wanted it to be like Vogue. There are few groups of people for whom fashion, makeup and hair is more relevant.”

— Luis Venegas, Meter, William Van (8 December 2010). "Bold Crossings of the Gender Line". The New York Times.

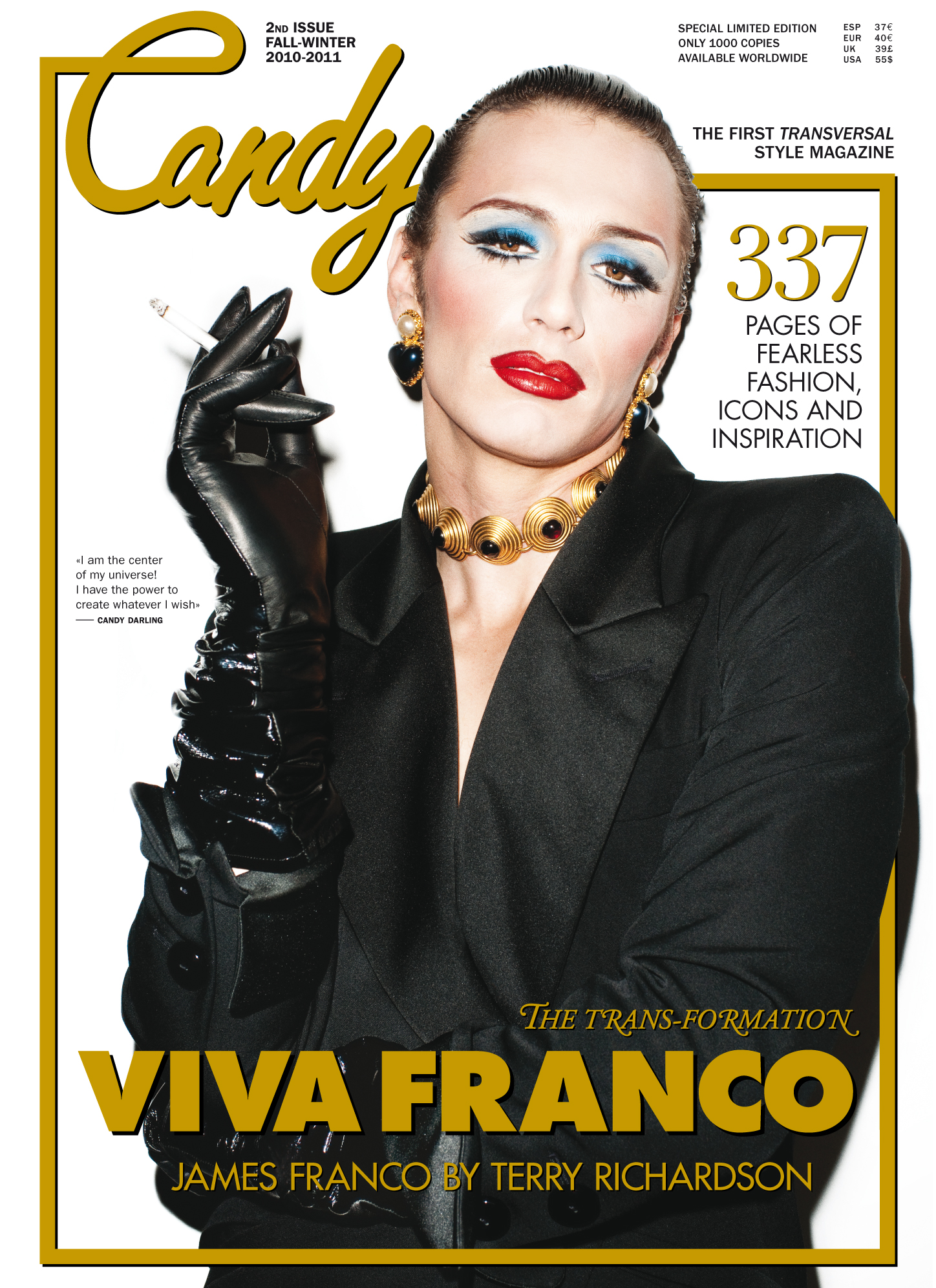
Cover of Candy with James Franco photographed by Terry Richardson

Photographers like Bruce Weber, Terry Richardson, Steven Klein, Tim Walker, David Armstrong, Ellen von Unwerth, Ryan McGinley, Walter Pfeiffer, Juan Gatti, Daniel Riera or Danielle Levitt and writers like Tim Blanks, Derek Blasberg or Hilton Als -among others- are regular contributors.

For the launch of the second issue, Venegas collaborated with Swedish design house Acne, creating a limited run of unisex blouses named after characters from the American soap opera, Dynasty.

Issues 1, 2, 3, 4, 6, and 8 had a single cover printed, with the 8th issue's being a gatefold cover. All other issues had multiple different covers, some featuring the same person on the cover (issues 5 and 9, featuring Connie Fleming and Miley Cyrus, respectively), others with different people on each different cover (issues 10 onwards). For issues 9 through 13, the number of different covers matches the issue number.

Issue	Date	Cover(s)	Notes
1	Winter 2009-2010	Luke Worral photographed by Brett Lloyd	
2	Winter 2010-2011	James Franco photographed by Terry Richardson	Features tributes to Divine and Christine Jorgensen, a photo essay by Bruce Weber, and interviews with Amanda Lepore, Kembra Pfahler, and Valentijn de Hingh. Venegas also appears in drag as Anna Wintour.
3	Winter 2011-2012	Chlöe Sevigny photographed by Terry Richardson	
4	Summer 2012	Tilda Swinton photographed by Xevi Muntané	"The Extra Extravagance Issue." Swinton is interviewed by Hilton Als. Features a makeup story by Kabuki, and interviews with Olivia Newton-John, The Lady Chablis, and Patricia Field.
5	Winter 2012-2013	Connie Fleming photographed by Danielle Levitt	The issue had two covers; one featuring Connie Fleming holding a U.S.A. flag, the other with her holding her hand on a bible. Includes a tribute to Candy Darling featuring the complete series and contact sheets of Peter Hujar's photograph "Candy Darling on Her Deathbed" published for the first time.
6	Summer 2013	Jared Leto photographed by Terry Richardson	
7	Winter 2013-2014	Lady Gaga photographed by Steven Klein	
7	Winter 2013-2014	Marilyn Manson photographed by Steven Klein	
8	Winter 2014-2015	Laverne Cox, Janet Mock, Carmen Carrera, Geena Rocero, Isis King, Gisele Alicea, Leyna Bloom, Dina Marie, Nina Poon, Juliana Huxtable, Niki M'nray, Pêche Di, Yasmine Petty, and Carmen Xtravaganza photographed by Mariano Vivanco	Dubbed "The Role Models" cover
9	2016	Miley Cyrus photographed by Terry Richardson	The issue has 9 different covers, all featuring Miley Cyrus in different poses: Miley licking armpit; Miley wearing a white bodysuit saying "My pussy my choice"; Miley dressed as a topless police officer sucking on a baton; Miley dressed in military camouflage pants and a yellow t-shirt saying "Women Marines" while licking her wrist; Miley topless doing V sign with her tongue out (signifying cunnilingus); Miley wearing black boots and bending over licking a strap-on dildo she's wearing; Miley squatting in short shorts with two fingers in her mouth; Miley topless bending backwards while smoking; Miley naked holding a white cat in front of her face
10	2017	Hari Nef photographed by Nan Goldin	Guest Editor Hari Nef. Includes a 48 page supplement made in collaboration with LOEWE titled "A Closer Look", by Steven Meisel.
10	2017	Dara photographed by Inez and Vinoodh	Guest Editor Hari Nef. Includes a 48 page supplement made in collaboration with LOEWE titled "A Closer Look", by Steven Meisel.
10	2017	Amiyah Scott photographed by Thomas McCarthy	Guest Editor Hari Nef. Includes a 48 page supplement made in collaboration with LOEWE titled "A Closer Look", by Steven Meisel.
10	2017	Andreja Pejic photographed by Terry Richardson	Guest Editor Hari Nef. Includes a 48 page supplement made in collaboration with LOEWE titled "A Closer Look", by Steven Meisel.
10	2017	Triana Seville photographed by Pierre-Ange Carlotti	Guest Editor Hari Nef. Includes a 48 page supplement made in collaboration with LOEWE titled "A Closer Look", by Steven Meisel.
10	2017	Connie Fleming photographed by Ethan James Green	Guest Editor Hari Nef. Includes a 48 page supplement made in collaboration with LOEWE titled "A Closer Look", by Steven Meisel.
10	2017	Audrey Marnay photographed by Leon Mark	Guest Editor Hari Nef. Includes a 48 page supplement made in collaboration with LOEWE titled "A Closer Look", by Steven Meisel.
10	2017	Avie Acosta photographed by Santiago & Mauricio	Guest Editor Hari Nef. Includes a 48 page supplement made in collaboration with LOEWE titled "A Closer Look", by Steven Meisel.
10	2017	Torraine Futurum photographed by Lia Clay	Guest Editor Hari Nef. Includes a 48 page supplement made in collaboration with LOEWE titled "A Closer Look", by Steven Meisel.
10	2017	Hari Nef + Andrés Velencoso photographed by Sebastian Faena	Guest Editor Hari Nef. Includes a 48 page supplement made in collaboration with LOEWE titled "A Closer Look", by Steven Meisel.
11	2018	Agosto Machado photographed by Ryan McGinley	
11	2018	Elliot Fletcher photographed by Amos Mac	
11	2018	A Tribute to Greer Lankton photographed by Michael Bailey-Gates	
11	2018	Rain Dove photographed by Cole Sprouse	
11	2018	EJ Johnson photographed by Greg Gorman	
11	2018	Stevie photographed by Lia Clay	
11	2018	Salvia photographed by Toyin Ibidapo	
11	2018	Joseph Ntahilaja photographed by Kristin-Lee Moolma	
11	2018	Jamie Wilson photographed by Thurstan Redding	
11	2018	Hari Nef photographed by Matt Holmes	
11	2018	Octavia St. Laurent photographed by Brian Lantelme	
12	2019	Aquaria photographed by Diego Villarreal	Includes a feature on the photography of Mariette Pathy Allen, previously unpublished Polaroids of Amanda Lepore by Mel Ottenberg, and interviews with Jackie Shane, Hanne Gaby Odiele, Erika Ervin, and Joey Gabriel with photographs by Nan Goldin and images of Gabriel's personal scrapbooks.
12	2019	Tilda Swinton + Harry Freegard photographed by Matt Lambert	Includes a feature on the photography of Mariette Pathy Allen, previously unpublished Polaroids of Amanda Lepore by Mel Ottenberg, and interviews with Jackie Shane, Hanne Gaby Odiele, Erika Ervin, and Joey Gabriel with photographs by Nan Goldin and images of Gabriel's personal scrapbooks.
12	2019	Teddy Quinlivan photographed by Katerina Jebb	Includes a feature on the photography of Mariette Pathy Allen, previously unpublished Polaroids of Amanda Lepore by Mel Ottenberg, and interviews with Jackie Shane, Hanne Gaby Odiele, Erika Ervin, and Joey Gabriel with photographs by Nan Goldin and images of Gabriel's personal scrapbooks.
12	2019	Arca photographed by Daniel Riera	Includes a feature on the photography of Mariette Pathy Allen, previously unpublished Polaroids of Amanda Lepore by Mel Ottenberg, and interviews with Jackie Shane, Hanne Gaby Odiele, Erika Ervin, and Joey Gabriel with photographs by Nan Goldin and images of Gabriel's personal scrapbooks.
12	2019	Joey Gabriel photographed by Sunny Suits	Includes a feature on the photography of Mariette Pathy Allen, previously unpublished Polaroids of Amanda Lepore by Mel Ottenberg, and interviews with Jackie Shane, Hanne Gaby Odiele, Erika Ervin, and Joey Gabriel with photographs by Nan Goldin and images of Gabriel's personal scrapbooks.
12	2019	Hanne Gaby Odiele photographed by Mat + Kat	Includes a feature on the photography of Mariette Pathy Allen, previously unpublished Polaroids of Amanda Lepore by Mel Ottenberg, and interviews with Jackie Shane, Hanne Gaby Odiele, Erika Ervin, and Joey Gabriel with photographs by Nan Goldin and images of Gabriel's personal scrapbooks.
12	2019	Mj Rodriguez, Indya Moore, Dominique Jackson, and Janet Mock photographed by Luke Gilford	Includes a feature on the photography of Mariette Pathy Allen, previously unpublished Polaroids of Amanda Lepore by Mel Ottenberg, and interviews with Jackie Shane, Hanne Gaby Odiele, Erika Ervin, and Joey Gabriel with photographs by Nan Goldin and images of Gabriel's personal scrapbooks.
12	2019	Jazzelle photographed by Louie Banks	Includes a feature on the photography of Mariette Pathy Allen, previously unpublished Polaroids of Amanda Lepore by Mel Ottenberg, and interviews with Jackie Shane, Hanne Gaby Odiele, Erika Ervin, and Joey Gabriel with photographs by Nan Goldin and images of Gabriel's personal scrapbooks.
12	2019	Bryce Anderson photographed by Michael Bailey-Gates	Includes a feature on the photography of Mariette Pathy Allen, previously unpublished Polaroids of Amanda Lepore by Mel Ottenberg, and interviews with Jackie Shane, Hanne Gaby Odiele, Erika Ervin, and Joey Gabriel with photographs by Nan Goldin and images of Gabriel's personal scrapbooks.
12	2019	Jamie Clayton photographed by Lia Clay	Includes a feature on the photography of Mariette Pathy Allen, previously unpublished Polaroids of Amanda Lepore by Mel Ottenberg, and interviews with Jackie Shane, Hanne Gaby Odiele, Erika Ervin, and Joey Gabriel with photographs by Nan Goldin and images of Gabriel's personal scrapbooks.
12	2019	Amanda Lepore photographed by Mel Ottenberg	Includes a feature on the photography of Mariette Pathy Allen, previously unpublished Polaroids of Amanda Lepore by Mel Ottenberg, and interviews with Jackie Shane, Hanne Gaby Odiele, Erika Ervin, and Joey Gabriel with photographs by Nan Goldin and images of Gabriel's personal scrapbooks.
12	2019	Josh Lavery photographed by Zack Bayly	Includes a feature on the photography of Mariette Pathy Allen, previously unpublished Polaroids of Amanda Lepore by Mel Ottenberg, and interviews with Jackie Shane, Hanne Gaby Odiele, Erika Ervin, and Joey Gabriel with photographs by Nan Goldin and images of Gabriel's personal scrapbooks.
13	Spring 2021	Arca photographed by Luis Venegas	Includes features about Billy Tipton and The Cockettes; art by Jimmy Wright and Hugh Steers; a tribute to Sylvester; photographs by Byron Newman from his Ultimate Angels series; photographs by Barry Kay from his 1976 book As a Woman, and interviews with Erika Hilton, Jimmy Paulette, the stars of Veneno, and Beverly Glenn-Copeland.
13	Spring 2021	Matthew Williams photographed by Leïla Smara	Includes features about Billy Tipton and The Cockettes; art by Jimmy Wright and Hugh Steers; a tribute to Sylvester; photographs by Byron Newman from his Ultimate Angels series; photographs by Barry Kay from his 1976 book As a Woman, and interviews with Erika Hilton, Jimmy Paulette, the stars of Veneno, and Beverly Glenn-Copeland.
13	Spring 2021	Daniela Santiago photographed by Alfredo Santamaría	Includes features about Billy Tipton and The Cockettes; art by Jimmy Wright and Hugh Steers; a tribute to Sylvester; photographs by Byron Newman from his Ultimate Angels series; photographs by Barry Kay from his 1976 book As a Woman, and interviews with Erika Hilton, Jimmy Paulette, the stars of Veneno, and Beverly Glenn-Copeland.
13	Spring 2021	Bretman Rock photographed by Diego Villarreal	Includes features about Billy Tipton and The Cockettes; art by Jimmy Wright and Hugh Steers; a tribute to Sylvester; photographs by Byron Newman from his Ultimate Angels series; photographs by Barry Kay from his 1976 book As a Woman, and interviews with Erika Hilton, Jimmy Paulette, the stars of Veneno, and Beverly Glenn-Copeland.
13	Spring 2021	Dustin Muchuvitz, Raya Martigny, Inès Rau, Zya Iman, and Nix Lecourt photographed by Louie Banks	Includes features about Billy Tipton and The Cockettes; art by Jimmy Wright and Hugh Steers; a tribute to Sylvester; photographs by Byron Newman from his Ultimate Angels series; photographs by Barry Kay from his 1976 book As a Woman, and interviews with Erika Hilton, Jimmy Paulette, the stars of Veneno, and Beverly Glenn-Copeland.
13	Spring 2021	Frank Ayzenberg photographed by Thibault-Theodore	Includes features about Billy Tipton and The Cockettes; art by Jimmy Wright and Hugh Steers; a tribute to Sylvester; photographs by Byron Newman from his Ultimate Angels series; photographs by Barry Kay from his 1976 book As a Woman, and interviews with Erika Hilton, Jimmy Paulette, the stars of Veneno, and Beverly Glenn-Copeland.
13	Spring 2021	Jimmy Paulette photographed by Nan Goldin	Includes features about Billy Tipton and The Cockettes; art by Jimmy Wright and Hugh Steers; a tribute to Sylvester; photographs by Byron Newman from his Ultimate Angels series; photographs by Barry Kay from his 1976 book As a Woman, and interviews with Erika Hilton, Jimmy Paulette, the stars of Veneno, and Beverly Glenn-Copeland.
13	Spring 2021	Richie Shazam's self-portrait	Includes features about Billy Tipton and The Cockettes; art by Jimmy Wright and Hugh Steers; a tribute to Sylvester; photographs by Byron Newman from his Ultimate Angels series; photographs by Barry Kay from his 1976 book As a Woman, and interviews with Erika Hilton, Jimmy Paulette, the stars of Veneno, and Beverly Glenn-Copeland.
13	Spring 2021	Michael Bailey-Gates's self-portrait	Includes features about Billy Tipton and The Cockettes; art by Jimmy Wright and Hugh Steers; a tribute to Sylvester; photographs by Byron Newman from his Ultimate Angels series; photographs by Barry Kay from his 1976 book As a Woman, and interviews with Erika Hilton, Jimmy Paulette, the stars of Veneno, and Beverly Glenn-Copeland.
13	Spring 2021	Wesley Tucker photographed by Doug Inglish	Includes features about Billy Tipton and The Cockettes; art by Jimmy Wright and Hugh Steers; a tribute to Sylvester; photographs by Byron Newman from his Ultimate Angels series; photographs by Barry Kay from his 1976 book As a Woman, and interviews with Erika Hilton, Jimmy Paulette, the stars of Veneno, and Beverly Glenn-Copeland.
13	Spring 2021	Aaron Rose Philip and Jake Junkins photographed by Mat + Kat	Includes features about Billy Tipton and The Cockettes; art by Jimmy Wright and Hugh Steers; a tribute to Sylvester; photographs by Byron Newman from his Ultimate Angels series; photographs by Barry Kay from his 1976 book As a Woman, and interviews with Erika Hilton, Jimmy Paulette, the stars of Veneno, and Beverly Glenn-Copeland.
13	Spring 2021	Pabllo Vittar photographed by Bryan Huynh	Includes features about Billy Tipton and The Cockettes; art by Jimmy Wright and Hugh Steers; a tribute to Sylvester; photographs by Byron Newman from his Ultimate Angels series; photographs by Barry Kay from his 1976 book As a Woman, and interviews with Erika Hilton, Jimmy Paulette, the stars of Veneno, and Beverly Glenn-Copeland.
13	Spring 2021	Amory Dahl photographed by Jack Pierson in collaboration with Tabboo!	Includes features about Billy Tipton and The Cockettes; art by Jimmy Wright and Hugh Steers; a tribute to Sylvester; photographs by Byron Newman from his Ultimate Angels series; photographs by Barry Kay from his 1976 book As a Woman, and interviews with Erika Hilton, Jimmy Paulette, the stars of Veneno, and Beverly Glenn-Copeland.
14	Summer 2022	Alexis Stone as Barbra Streisand photographed by Louie Banks	Includes interviews with Elvira by Valeria Vegas and Lypsinka by Simon Doonan with tributes to David Armstrong, International Chrysis, and Candy Darling
14	Summer 2022	Transgendertrucks + Arca (self-portrait)	Includes interviews with Elvira by Valeria Vegas and Lypsinka by Simon Doonan with tributes to David Armstrong, International Chrysis, and Candy Darling
14	Summer 2022	RuPaul photographed by Richard Renaldi	Includes interviews with Elvira by Valeria Vegas and Lypsinka by Simon Doonan with tributes to David Armstrong, International Chrysis, and Candy Darling
14	Summer 2022	Alex Consani photographed by Bryce Anderson	Includes interviews with Elvira by Valeria Vegas and Lypsinka by Simon Doonan with tributes to David Armstrong, International Chrysis, and Candy Darling
14	Summer 2022	Elvyra photographed by Greg Gorman	Includes interviews with Elvira by Valeria Vegas and Lypsinka by Simon Doonan with tributes to David Armstrong, International Chrysis, and Candy Darling
14	Summer 2022	Jane, Erica and Ella photographed by Michael Bailey-Gates	Includes interviews with Elvira by Valeria Vegas and Lypsinka by Simon Doonan with tributes to David Armstrong, International Chrysis, and Candy Darling
14	Summer 2022	Crystal Love photographed by Zac Bayly	Includes interviews with Elvira by Valeria Vegas and Lypsinka by Simon Doonan with tributes to David Armstrong, International Chrysis, and Candy Darling
14	Summer 2022	Zholie, Charlie, Cici, Jake and Alaska photographed by Emilio Tamez	Includes interviews with Elvira by Valeria Vegas and Lypsinka by Simon Doonan with tributes to David Armstrong, International Chrysis, and Candy Darling
14	Summer 2022	Gottmik photographed by Carlos Darder	Includes interviews with Elvira by Valeria Vegas and Lypsinka by Simon Doonan with tributes to David Armstrong, International Chrysis, and Candy Darling
14	Summer 2022	Lypsinka photographed by Jeff Bark	Includes interviews with Elvira by Valeria Vegas and Lypsinka by Simon Doonan with tributes to David Armstrong, International Chrysis, and Candy Darling
14	Summer 2022	Ella Snyder photographed by Diego Villarreal	Includes interviews with Elvira by Valeria Vegas and Lypsinka by Simon Doonan with tributes to David Armstrong, International Chrysis, and Candy Darling
14	Summer 2022	Alok photographed by Camila Falquez	Includes interviews with Elvira by Valeria Vegas and Lypsinka by Simon Doonan with tributes to David Armstrong, International Chrysis, and Candy Darling
15	2025	Candy Darling photographed by Jack Mitchell	
15	2025	Tilda Swinton photographed by Daniel Riera	
15	2025	Mel Ottenberg photographed by Trevor Stones	
15	2025	Bibiana Fernández photographed by Daniel Riera	
15	2025	Hunter Piper photographed by Anthony Berarco	
15	2025	Saturn Risin9 photographed by Paul Mpagi Sepuya	
15	2025	Lily photographed by Angalis Field	
15	2025	The Coven photographed by Ryan McGinley	
15	2025	Nussy Andrews photographed by Torbjørn Rødland	
15	2025	Aidan daSilva photographed by Geelherme	
15	2025	Christopher Smith's self-portrait	
15	2025	Arca photographed by Filip Custic	
15	2025	Connie Fleming photographed by Claudio Robles	
15	2025	Hari Nef and Ludwig Hurtado photographed by Claudio Robles	
15	2025	Amanda Lepore photographed by Claudio Robles	

In 2020 Venegas edited THE C☆NDY BOOK OF TRANSVERSAL CREATIVITY celebrating the 10th anniversary of the magazine. With the subtitle THE BEST OF C☆NDY TRANSVERSAL MAGAZINE, ALLEGEDLY, the book is a compilation that includes photography and art from over 100 artists from the first 12 issues, as well as new writings reflecting on the magazine's cultural impact.

== Other projects ==
Invited by Christian Lacroix in 2008 he was a judge for the prestigious photography festival Rencontres d’Arles alongside Elisabeth Biondi, Caroline Issa & Masoud Golsorkhi, Nathalie Ours and Carla Sozzani.

As a Creative Director in Spring 2012 he directed a video for the launch of Loewe’s Oro Collection which became popular and highly controversial in Spain. As a result, the collection sold out and it turned out to be the best seller of the year for the LVMH's Spanish brand.

In 2013 he took part as a panelist for a Fashion Seminar in Helsinki curated by Daniel Thawley in which also participated Marc Ascoli, Michel Gaubert, Jonathan Anderson, Benjamin Bruno and Karen van Godtsenhoven held at the Aalto University.

Venegas has also DJ’d in various venues around the world including Plastic in Milan, George & Dragon and Bistrotheque in London, Razzmatazz in Barcelona, Kaiku in Helsinki and at the Boom Boom Room in New York City.

He occasionally is a professor in Madrid and Barcelona.
