= Alain Laboile =

French photographer and sculptor (born 1968)

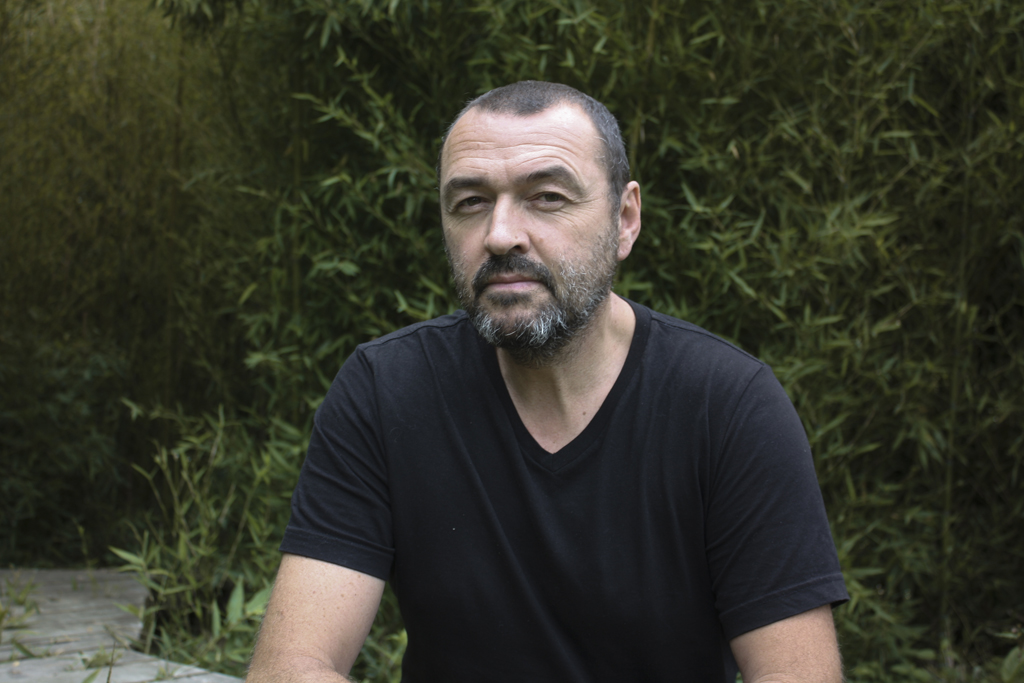

Alain Laboile is a French photographer and sculptor.

Born in Bordeaux in 1968, he bought a digital camera in 2004 to document his sculpture, but later became focused on his family instead.

His monograph At the End of the World was published by Kehrer Verlag in 2015.
