= New York Life Gallery =

Contemporary and modern art gallery

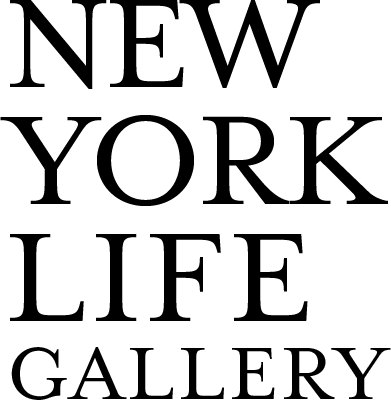
- Established: 2022
- Location: 167-169 Canal Street, Floor 5, New York, NY 10013
- Coordinates: 40°43′00″N 73°59′49″W
- Type: Art gallery
- Owner: Ethan James Green
- Website: newyorklifegallery.com

New York Life Gallery is a contemporary art gallery located in Chinatown, Manhattan, New York City. It was founded in 2022 by photographer and gallerist Ethan James Green. The gallery also hosts artist talks, process-based installations, and zine launches.

== History ==
The gallery was established in 2022 when founder Ethan James Green adapted his Chinatown photography studio into a public exhibition space. The first exhibition held there was focused on the work of Steven Cuffie.
