= Avie Acosta =

American former fashion model

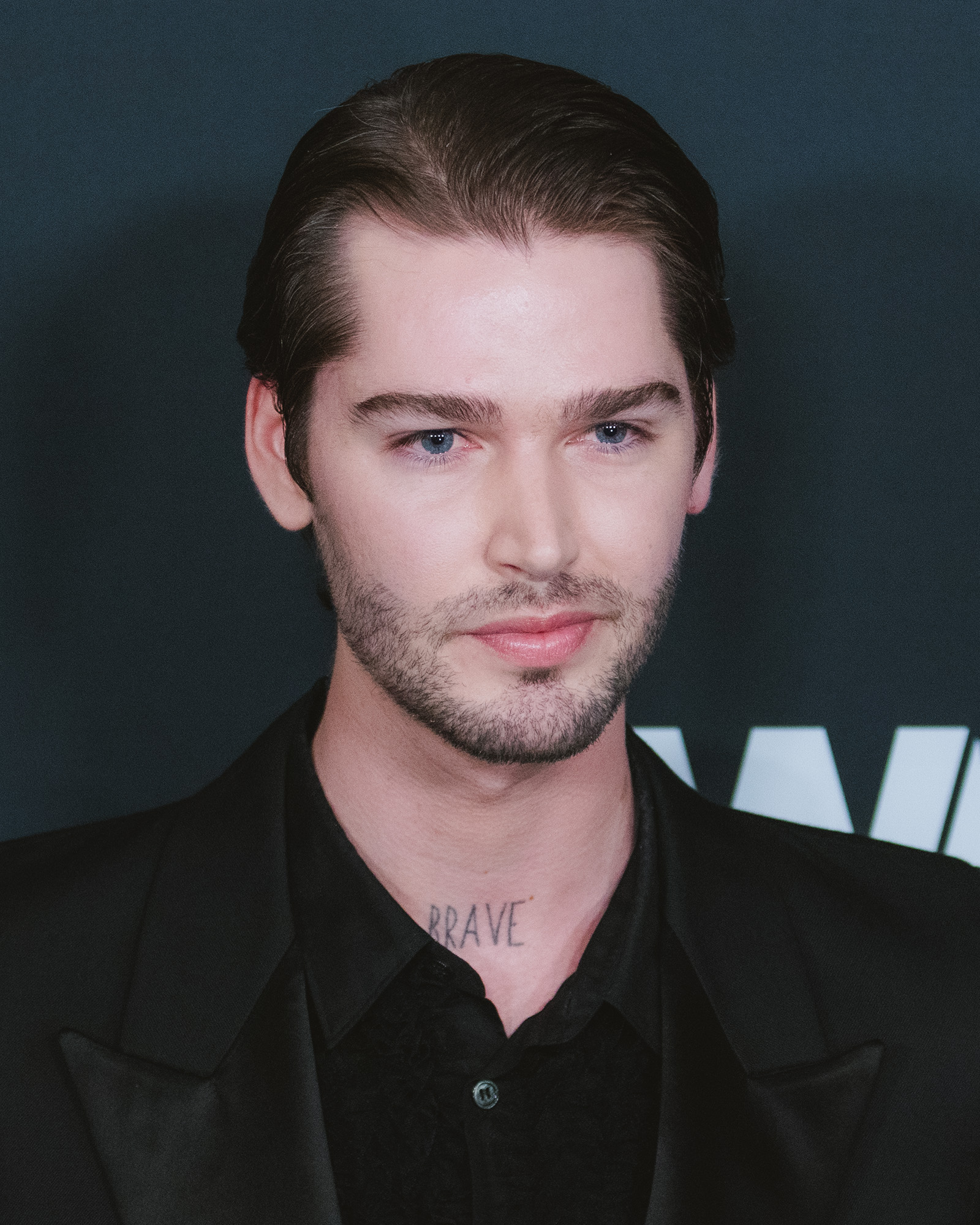
- Acosta in 2026
- Born: 1996 or 1997 (age 29–30)
- Modeling information
- Height: 6 ft 1 in (1.85 m)
- Agency: Wilhelmina Models

Avie Acosta is an American former fashion model who worked for such designers as Marc Jacobs, Moschino, Philipp Plein, Random Identities, and Christian Siriano, and was profiled by The Cut, Out, and Paper.

Acosta has consistently rejected fixed gender labels, telling Paper that "any label is a restriction". Acosta walked in Marc Jacobs's Fall 2017 show alongside transgender models Stav Strashko and Casil McArthur in a season widely covered for its runway diversity. The New York Times cited the casting as an example of transgender models having become "no longer unusual" on mainstream runways.

== Early life ==
Acosta lived in Edmond, Oklahoma, and worked at a sports bar in Oklahoma City. They changed their name to Avie and began hormone treatments while still in Oklahoma. They moved to New York City at 19.

== Career ==
Acosta was photographed by Ethan James Green for Teen Vogue in 2016 and appeared in Green's book Young New York. Acosta was discovered at a Marc Jacobs party in New York and signed by Wilhelmina Models to its men's board. (Note: Most trans women models, including Hari Nef and Andreja Pejić, were signed to women's divisions.)

Acosta has walked for Gogo Graham, Marc Jacobs, Philipp Plein, and Christian Siriano; has been photographed for Candy, CR Fashion Book, Document Journal, Interview, Lampoon (Italy), Purple, Schön!, and Vogue Portugal; and modeled in campaigns for Dr. Martens and Philipp Plein.

Acosta has said clothing has no inherent gender, and has described media coverage that focuses on trans people's gender identity as crass. They told Glamour, "Fashion is not going to liberate anyone's gender—that's within yourself."
