= Transgender people in fashion =

Beginning in the mid-20th century, transgender people have increasingly played a prominent role in the fashion industry, primarily as models. Their employment has become more controversial since the rise of the anti-trans movement in the 2020s.

== History ==
=== 20th century ===
April Ashley of the United Kingdom is widely believed to have been the first major transgender model, appearing in Vogue in the year 1960. Her modeling career was cut short after she was outed by British tabloids in 1961, after which brands and clients ceased to hire her.

Back in the United Kingdom, Caroline Cossey - known professionally as “Tula” - began her career in 1975, appearing in Australian Vogue and Harper's Bazaar. In 1981, after appearing in the James Bond film For Your Eyes Only, she was outed by British tabloids which ended her career. Despite that, she later became the first openly transgender woman to model for Playboy in 1991.

In the United States, the first major transgender model came at the end of the 1970s in the form of African-American model Tracey Norman, who appeared in several major publications including Vogue, as well as modeling for Balenciaga and several high profile cosmetics campaigns. Her career was likewise cut short in 1980, after being outed by the magazine Essence.

Overlapping with Norman was the career of Teri Toye, who began modeling at Parsons in 1979. By the 1980s, she’d become a prominent figure in the East Village arts scene, before rising to model in 1984 for the likes of Chanel, Mugler, and Jean Paul Gaultier; as well as appearing in German Vogue, all despite being openly transgender. That same year, she was named “Girl of the Year” by New York Times fashion columnist John Duka.

In the early 1990s, African-American trans model Connie Girl served as a muse for both Thierry Mugler and Vivienne Westwood, and has continued to model for Mugler into the present day, walking for the brand as late as 2023.

=== 21st century ===
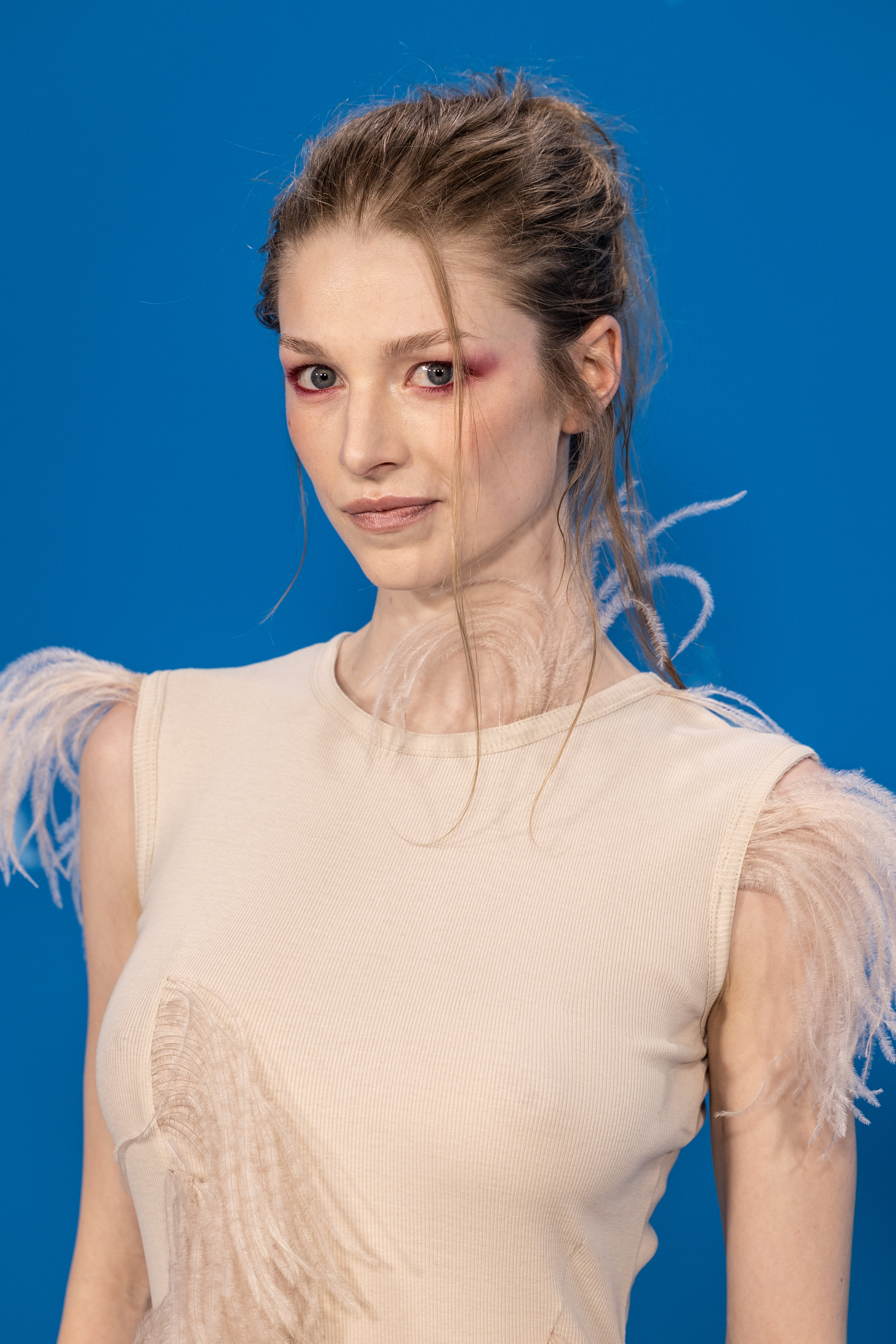
Transgender model Hunter Schafer at the 74th Berlin International Film Festival

Following the trans tipping point in 2015, transgender models became increasingly central to the fashion industry.

In 2018, following Victoria's Secret marketing chief Edward Razek saying that transgender models should not be cast in VS shows, the brand hired Valentina Sampaio as its first transgender model - with Razek leaving the company soon after. In September 2018, transgender Norwegian model Siri Lehland was featured on the cover of Norwegian Elle.

Moving into the 2020s, transgender models began regularly holding spots on the Met Gala's guest list - with notable examples including Hunter Schafer, Alex Consani (who later served on the gala's host committee in 2026), Valentina Sampaio, and Aariana Rose Philip.

In 2020 Hunter Schafer became the face of Shiseido, followed by becoming the face of Prada in 2021, and Mugler's Angel Elixir perfume in 2023.

In 2024, Alex Consani became the first trans woman to be named Model of the Year at the Fashion Awards, and in that same year she and Valentina Sampaio became the first transgender models to walk in the coveted Victoria's Secret Fashion Show.

As the anti-trans movements in the United States and United Kingdom grew in prominence, the use of transgender models became increasingly divisive - with some models reporting their careers drying up entirely due to clients refusing to work with trans models, and some brands suffering boycotts for the use of trans women in their marketing materials. Conversely, the slogan "Protect The Dolls" (dolls being a term for trans women) became common as a statement of support in the fashion scene, after designer Conner Ives wore a shirt with the words on it down the runway in 2025, at the recommendation of transgender model Hunter Pifer (not to be confused with Hunter Schafer).

In 2025, Glamour UK named "The Dolls" as their women of the year.

== See also ==
- Transgender people in chess
- Transgender people in sports
