= Ethan James Green =

American photographer and gallerist (born 1990)

- Born: Ethan James Green; 1990 (age 35–36); Caledonia, Michigan, U.S.
- Occupations: Photographer; filmmaker; director; gallerist
- Height: 6 ft 2 in (188 cm)

Ethan James Green (born 1990) is an American photographer, former fashion model, and the founder of New York Life Gallery.

== Early life ==
Green grew up in Caledonia, Michigan, where he began photographing his friends at the age of 14. In 2007, at age 17, he signed with Ford Models, and he moved to New York City the following year.

As a model, he appeared in a Calvin Klein campaign and was photographed by David Armstrong, appearing in Armstrong's 2011 book 615 Jefferson Ave. He began working as Armstrong's assistant, and Armstrong became his mentor.

== Career ==
=== Photography ===
Marcs, 2015, from the series Young New York

After relocating to New York, Green continued photographing his friends and peers, often meeting subjects through nightlife and social media. Early subjects included actress and model Hari Nef; stylist and Interview's fashion director Dara; photographer Cruz Valdez; models Avie Acosta, Marcs Goldberg, and Stevie Triano; writer Devan Diaz; and artist and poet Ser Serpas.

Green is openly gay. In 2014, he began taking portraits of his queer, transgender, and nonbinary friends, usually in the Lower East Side's Corlears Hook Park. The portraits, some of which appeared on Tumblr, drew comparisons to Diane Arbus. In 2019, Aperture Foundation published the portraits as the monograph Young New York.

Green's second monograph, Bombshell, was published by Baron in 2024. The work, made from 2021 to 2022, invited his models to style and pose themselves around the idea of the "bombshell" archetype.

As a commercial photographer, Green has shot editorials for Arena Homme +, Dazed, Double Magazine, Foam Magazine, Harper's Bazaar, i-D, L'Uomo Vogue, MARFA, le Monde, Perfect, The New Yorker, Time, Vogue, Vogue Italia, W Magazine, and WSJ Magazine; campaigns for Alexander McQueen, Dior, Fendi, Louis Vuitton, Miu Miu, Prada, Tom Ford, and Versace; and portraits of Naomi Campbell, Bella Hadid, Kate Moss, Rihanna, RuPaul, and John Waters.

In 2025, Green was selected as the photographer for the Pirelli Calendar, an annual publication produced by Pirelli since 1964. His edition was titled Refresh and Reveal.

=== New York Life Gallery ===
In 2022, Green transformed his Chinatown studio into an artist-run exhibition space, establishing New York Life Gallery. The gallery has presented a range of projects, including a live performance by painter and illustrator Drake Carr and an archive of work by the late photographer Steven Cuffie. The gallery also organizes artist-led programs and publishes zines and small-run artist publications.

== Exhibitions ==
=== Solo ===
- "Made to Last". New York, NY: Fotografiska. 2022.
- "Bombshell". New York, NY: Kapp Kapp. 2024.
- "Bombshell". Los Angeles, CA: Mariposa Gallery. 2025.

=== Group ===
- "Self Service 25th Anniversary". Dallas, TX: Dallas Contemporary Museum. 2019.
- "Taylor Wessing Photographic Portrait Prize 2019: Photographer in Focus". London, UK: National Portrait Gallery. 2019.
- "Christian Dior: Designer of Dreams". New York, NY: Brooklyn Museum. 2021.
- "Turn My Way". New York, NY: OCD Chinatown. 2024.

== Publications ==
- Maheshwar. New York, NY: Dashwood Books. 2019. (zine)
- Young New York. New York, NY: Aperture. 2019. ISBN 978-1-59711-454-7.
- Bombshell. New York, NY: Dashwood Books. 2021. (zine)
- Bombshell. London, UK: Baron Books. 2024.
