= Connie Fleming =

Jamaican-born American fashion model

- Born: 1964 or 1965 (age 60–61); Jamaica
- Other name: Connie Girl
- Occupations: Supermodel; drag performer; fashion illustrator; artist
- Years active: 1984–present

Connie Fleming, also known as Connie Girl, is a Jamaican-born American supermodel and former drag performer. She became prominent in New York City in the 80s and 90s, first as a drag performer part of the "Boy Bar Beauties", and then as a fashion model and muse for the likes of Vivienne Westwood and Thierry Mugler. She is a transgender woman, and transphobia within the fashion industry halted her modeling career. She has subsequently been named an "it girl" and a pioneer of transgender models.

== Early life ==
Fleming was born in Jamaica. She has no siblings. She and her mother moved to Flatbush in New York City, US, when she was five years old to pursue a better education and to leave her alcoholic father. During her school years, Fleming began openly identifying as a trans girl. She was bullied while at school and faced physical and sexual violence. At the same time, her relationship with her mother became strained. She graduated high school in 1984.

== Career ==
Fleming was one of the first transgender supermodels. In 1984, while working at a boutique, Fleming met David Glamamore, a drag queen, and Matthew Kasten. Through Kasten, Fleming got work drag performing at the Boy Bar. Glamamore and Fleming became known as "Boy Bar Beauties", and Fleming found herself a downtown celebrity becoming known as "Connie Girl". She was also a doorperson at clubs, referring to herself as "the door bitch from hell", and was known for her "evil door bitch" persona.

Later, Fleming decided to leave the Boy Bar and drag performing in order to become a serious fashion model. She felt like her identity as a transgender woman was not taken seriously when she was a drag performer, and that she was labelled as a drag queen, although she did not identify as such. While working as a drag performer, Fleming met International Chrysis, who introduced her to fashion modeling.

She was a model at the 1989 and 1990 editions of Paris Fashion Week for Thierry Mugler and appeared in the 1992 music video of the song "Too Funky" by George Michael. She modeled for Patricia Field, Steven Meisel, Thierry Mugler, and Vivienne Westwood. She was the muse of Mugler and Westwood, and frequently appeared in Mugler's runways. Her appearance as an openly transgender woman was controversial and led to the belief that Mugler's business would end.

During her time as a model, Fleming was subject to transphobia. She was deemed difficult to work with for refusing to answer transphobic questions, and lost opportunities. The rise of drag queen RuPaul also made it difficult for Fleming to be taken seriously as a woman and not a drag performer, with whom she was frequently grouped. Her career in modeling was halted due to the transphobia and as the trend of drag grew less popular. Fleming began producing fashion shows and continued working in clubs. She later became a fashion illustrator. In 2012, she portrayed Michelle Obama for the cover of Candy Magazine.

During the COVID-19 pandemic, Fleming drew art. Some of her work was displayed in Never Apart's art gallery in 2021. She works as a doorperson at Le Bain as of 2020. In 2023, Fleming made her comeback to modeling by walking the runway at Casey Cadwallader's SS24 show for Mugler. Laverne Cox praised the "historic" return. She walked again under Cadwallader for Mugler at the Fall/Winter 2024–2025 show.

== Legacy ==
Fleming was named an "it girl" by The Cut and The New York Times. She is also considered a transgender icon.

Fleming's look at Mugler's Spring/Summer 1992 show, a rhinestone corset with a ten-gallon hat, was named one of the most iconic catwalk images by British Vogue. In 2024, Beyoncé paid homage to the image in a photoshoot for her eighth studio album Cowboy Carter. Fleming is considered a pioneer of transgender models. Fleming's appearance on major runways as an openly transgender woman was a rarity in its time.

== Personal life ==
Fleming transitioned in the 1980s. Though she and her mother had a strained relationship when she was a teenager, they eventually reconciled. Fleming got breast implants in 2000, and was diagnosed with BIA-ALCL lymphoma, a rare form of cancer, as a result. She was declared cancer-free in July 2019.
