= Alex Consani =

American model and social media personality (born 2003)

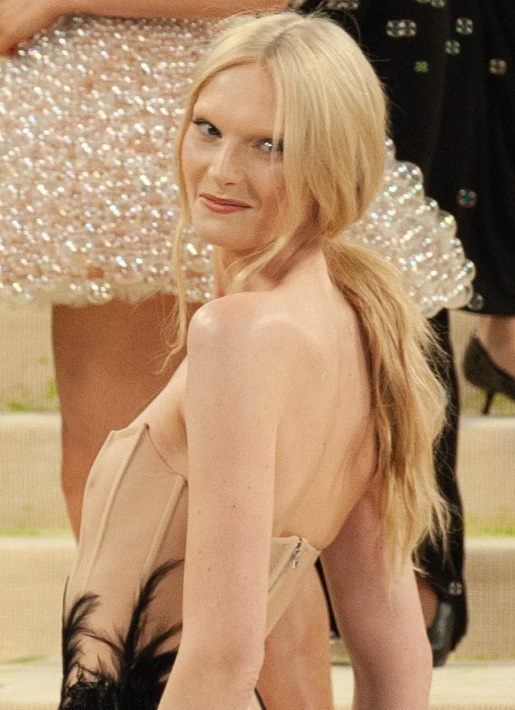
- Consani at the Met Gala in 2026
- Born: July 23, 2003 (age 23); Petaluma, California, U.S.
- Education: Pace University
- Occupations: Model; influencer
- Years active: 2015–present
- Known for: Modeling
- Modeling information
- Height: 6 ft 0 in (1.83 m)
- Hair color: Blonde
- Eye color: Gray
- Agency: IMG Models (worldwide); Look Model Agency (San Francisco)

TikTok information
- Page: Alex Consani
- Followers: 6.8 million
- Last updated: June 20, 2026

Alex Monette Consani (born July 23, 2003) is an American model and actress. She started modeling in 2015 and became the world's youngest transgender model at the time at age 12. After signing with IMG Models in 2019, Consani started using TikTok in 2020 during the COVID-19 pandemic and became popular online for her comedic videos, earning over three million followers by 2024. In 2024, Consani was the first transgender model to win the Fashion Award for Model of the Year and, along with Valentina Sampaio, to walk for the Victoria's Secret Fashion Show.

== Early life ==
Alex Monette Consani was born on July 23, 2003, in Petaluma, California. Her mother works in water conservation while her father works with Guide Dogs for the Blind. She is of Italian, English, and German descent. She is transgender. She began wearing feminine clothing at age four before deciding on the name Alex at age eight and undergoing hormone replacement therapy during puberty.

She started modeling in early 2015 after her mother found an advertisement on Facebook for Slay Model Management, a Los Angeles-based modeling agency made up entirely of transgender models. She became, at the time, the youngest transgender model in the world at age 12.

In 2016, a profile on her in Cosmopolitan Germany went viral online. She appeared in a photoshoot with Dominique Jackson at age 13.

In 2021, Consani graduated from Petaluma High School and began attending Pace University with the help of Petaluma Educational Foundation, receiving an Alphabet Soup Thrift Store Scholarship and a MacIlvain Family Scholarship.

== Career ==
Consani signed with IMG Models in August 2019 at age 16 and moved to New York City at age 18.She began posting absurdistGen Z-focused comedic videos on TikTok in 2020 during the COVID-19 pandemic under the username captincroook, also using the name Miss Mawma, and gained more than 700,000 followers by 2022.

Consani made her runway debut in New York City for Tom Ford in 2021. She was included on GLAAD's 20 Under 20 list, which honors "outstanding young LGBTQ changemakers", for 2022, and walked in runways for Versace and Alexander McQueen during Fall/Winter 2022.

Vogue named her one of the standout models of Spring/Summer 2023, during which she walked in runways for Boss by Hugo Boss, Burberry, Chloé, Roberto Cavalli, and Coperni. She was featured in Victoria's Secret's reimagining of their Fashion Show, "The Tour '23," which returned to runway format in October 2024 after a five-year hiatus. She was the face of Jean Paul Gaultier's collaborative collection with London-based brand Knwls, which was released in September 2023. Consani was the exclusive model for Conner Ives' Spring/Summer 2024 collection in collaboration with Depop, "Late Capitalism".

By early 2024, Consani had over two million followers and over 150 million likes across her videos on TikTok. She appeared in the music videos for the JT song "Okay" and for the Charli XCX song "360" in April and May 2024, respectively. On October 15, 2024, Consani and Valentina Sampaio became the first transgender models to walk in the Victoria's Secret Fashion Show.

In May 2026, Consani became the first trans woman to serve on the host committee for the Met Gala. Consani voiced a DJ of a club beats radio station alongside Robyn, in the video game Grand Theft Auto VI.

== Impact ==
Alyssa Morin of E! News called Consani "fashion's new it girl" in February 2023, while Bustle and PinkNews both described her as "the 'It Girl' of 2024". L'Officiel's Grace Clarke called Consani "easily one of the biggest models" of 2024 and "one of the most popular transgender models in the industry".

By 2023, she had more than 1.4 million followers on TikTok. i-D stated in 2023 that she was "as well known for her harebrained subway dances... and goofy disposition [on TikTok] as she is for her turns on the Alexander McQueen and Versace runways". Guy Trebay of The New York Times wrote that Consani's behavior in her viral videos was "occasionally divisive" and "sometimes put her at odds with socially acceptable conduct" and that her voice had been classed on Reddit as "an accent imitative of the way some Black people speak". Brock Colyar of The Cut wrote in 2024 that her TikTok videos, which "involve her being very loud and sort of annoying in very public spaces", were "constantly going viral".

CR Fashion Book's Vienna Vernose called her bleached hair and "fairy-like" features "distinctive" and called her runway walk "serious and powerful". In October 2023, she was included on the Forbes Top Creators Fashion 50 list, where she had the highest engagement rate on the list at 21.5% and was described as having "signature bleached hair and brows".

== Awards ==
She was nominated for the Fashion Award for Model of the Year in 2024, making her the first openly transgender woman to be nominated for the award. By then, she had over three million followers on TikTok. In December 2024, Consani was named in the Forbes 30 Under 30 list. On December 2, 2024, Consani became the first transgender person to win the Fashion Award for Model of the Year.

In 2025, Consani was included on Time's inaugural Time 100 Creators list. Also in 2025, she made her Met Gala debut.

In 2026, Consani was included on Time's Time100 Next list. Also in 2026, she became the first transgender woman to co-host the Met Gala.

== Videography ==
=== Music video appearances ===
Music video appearances
| Year | Song title | Artist | Ref. |
|---|---|---|---|
| 2024 | "Okay" | JT | |
| 2024 | "360" | Charli XCX | |
| 2025 | "Gorgeous" | Doja Cat | |

== Filmography ==
=== Films ===
Film appearances
| Year | Title | Role | Ref. |
|---|---|---|---|
| TBA | Peaked † | TBA | Post-production |
| TBA | Preppy † | TBA | Filming |

=== Short films ===
Film appearances
| Year | Title | Role | Ref. |
|---|---|---|---|
| 2023 | Paradigm Trilogy: Recognition Vs. Expression | | |
| 2025 | The Tiger | Herself | |

=== Television ===
| Year | Title | Role | Ref. |
|---|---|---|---|
| 2026 | American Horror Story: 13 | Morwenna | Recurring role; 5 episodes |

=== Video games ===
| Year | Title | Role | Notes | Ref(s) |
|---|---|---|---|---|
| 2026 | Grand Theft Auto VI | Alex | Radio station host (voice-over) | |

== See also ==
- Transgender people in fashion
