= Drake Carr =

American artist (born 1993)

- Born: 1993 (age 32–33); Flint, Michigan, U.S.
- Occupations: Artist; illustrator
- Known for: Portraiture; cut-outs

Drake Carr (born 1993, Flint, Michigan) is an American artist primarily known for his paintings and drawings of art and fashion luminaries, as well as large-scale cut-out works.

Carr's work has been shown internationally, with exhibitions at New York Life Gallery, FIERMAN, and Situations in New York; Anat Ebgi Gallery in Los Angeles; and Mariposa in Paris.

== Early life ==
Carr was born in Flint, Michigan in 1993.

== Career ==
Upon moving to New York, he began painting large-scale cut-outs of friends and peers in a day-glow-like, hyper-stylized manner. Carr has worked mostly in the service industry, which he takes as a source of artistic inspiration. His works move across various medium in drawing, painting, cut-outs, sculpture, and installation.

Carr and Sabrina Bockler co-illustrated Samuel R. Delany's book, Big Joe (Inpatient Press, 2021).
