= Split: Portrait of a Drag Queen =

1993 American documentary film

Split: Portrait of a Drag Queen is a 1993 American documentary film by directors Ellen Fisher Turk and Andrew Weeks. The film details the life, legacy and art of drag queen and New York performer International Chrysis.

The filmmakers followed International Chrysis when the drag queen and New York "show girl" was performing in many of Manhattan's underground clubs. The film details the lifestory of the artist born William Shumacher, who is now a forerunner of fluidity in her sexual identification—a woman from the waist up and a man from the waist down. International Chrysis also achieved heightened fame for being in Salvador Dali’s inner circle.

The New York Times said the film was "an affectionate homage to a would-be star." Time Out New York described the film as "a dizzying story... and a moving one."
