= Gogo Graham =

American fashion designer (born 1991)

- Born: 1991 (age 34–35)
- Education: University of Texas at Austin
- Occupation: fashion designer

Gogo Graham (born 1991) is an American fashion designer who designs clothing specifically catered to trans women. Originally from Texas, she now is based in Brooklyn, NY, and has worked under costume and fashion designer Zaldy. She has since branched out to create her own collections and has had two collections shown at New York Fashion Week.

Graham's work ethos has attracted a following of trans women who have formed a community of support for one another. She explains of her brand, "the evolution of my identity as a trans woman is reflected in the evolution of the collection; sometimes rigid, sometimes fluid, sometimes stagnant, sometimes dynamic." In addition to creating apparel accommodating the specific needs of trans women, Graham is also a committed advocate for the socio-political issues transgender women face in society today.

== Personal life ==
Born in 1991, Gogo Graham was raised in Pearland, Texas, and went on to study pre-med at the University of Texas at Austin. One credit short of graduation, she transferred to a degree in textiles and apparel, which sparked the beginning of her career in design. Upon graduation, Graham moved to New York City to center herself within the hub of the fashion world. Her move into fashion was motivated by the lack of inclusivity she experienced herself as a trans woman when trying to find clothing that suited her body shape. She has explained that trans women "don't have options in fashion," because clothing is made either for traditionally male or female bodies.

== Career ==
Upon arriving in New York, Graham began working for costume designer Zaldy, whom she collaborated with on designs for a J-Pop band, and famous drag queen RuPaul. She then left to work at a factory in Midtown which gave her more creative freedom in constructing avant-garde clothing, as opposed to ready-to-wear style. At the same time, she "started making designs for photography projects with her friend and collaborator Serena Jara". Graham became interested in designing for trans women after coming out herself, and once she had enough industry experience, Graham begant designing her own collections to address the different body types and stylistic needs of trans women.

Graham's self-made fashion brand recycles materials and repurposes found items to construct a collective line. Her production process heavily involves the women for whom the clothing is being made; she consults with them on which features they want accentuated and then works to deliver a piece that best fits these criteria. She explains "some people care more than others about how they need to be presented in shows and I take that into account when putting everything together." Graham has been vocal on the importance of self-representation by marginalized groups in the media, explaining in 2015 that “being portrayed by cis people is inherently exploitative no matter which way you spin it." In addition to fashion design, Graham is also a sculptor, painter, and DJ, which she incorporates into her shows by providing the soundtracks and assisting with hair and makeup backstage.

Graham has presented two collections at NYFW, and has completed five full-length collections. She advocates for financial support from the fashion industry to empower the trans women involved and to ensure the longevity of the movement. Graham says, "having fashion shows gives me an opportunity to pay models," which she believes provides personal agency within the industry. Mars Hobrecker and Leah James explain how transgender models "have become a hot topic in recent years thanks to Bruce Weber's all-trans campaign for Barneys and diverse runways at Eckhaus Latta, Chromat, and Hood by Air." Graham believes financial compensation for the trans models involved in campaigns such as these will hinder mainstream fashion lines from exploiting the community in order to gain recognition and popularity. Still continuing to produce only one-of-a-kind pieces, Graham has not enabled factory production or begun work on ready-made lines.

== Production and inspiration ==
Graham designs individualized clothing specifically formed to a particular model's body and persona. As she describes, “I cast before I create the looks, so I’ll be thinking about all the girls individually and send them photos of inspiration or looks in progress." Her work tends to be informal and grotesque in nature which provides a sharp contrast to the aesthetics of mainstream fashion. Jillian Billard notes of Graham's designs "there is this running theme that seems to be led by a fascination with deconstruction, printed patterns and texture." Stylistically, she has been inspired by games such as Final Fantasy and Devil May Cry, which she references through their dramatic visuals and hyper-saturated hues. Additionally, she addresses the multilayered oppression that is persistent in today's society for trans women, particularly trans women of color. With this being the recurring message of her designs, Graham attempts to reduce the dysphoria often felt by many trans women who struggle with self-image and identification.

The SS16 show which she presented at Ace Hotel New York "was in itself a love letter to trans sisterhood," with Graham bringing together a multitude of trans women to work on the show. The visuals emulated as 'un-done' look which was done with "arms, fingers and ensembles, still wet from being painted crimson by Glossy, Kaidon Ho and Kelley McNutt only minutes before."

Her AW16 show featured a confronting nature and nuanced style that referenced the “Final Girl” horror film trope, which describes the final character alive at the end of the film who is able to speak to the horrors experienced by the group. Held at Artists Space in Tribeca, the models walked the runway in torn, blood-drenched clothing which called attention to the high fatality rate and recurring violence experienced by the trans community. The nature of the show was made deliberately claustrophobic and uncomfortable to represent the vulnerability trans women feel when navigating through a potentially threatening society.

In Graham's NYFW Spring 2017 show "the looks were feminine and sensual, with contrasting details such as the use of black, wire detailing, and the chokers many models wore with delicate lace pieces."

Another of Graham's exhibitions, her 2017 Dragon Lady, highlighted her dissatisfaction with stereotypes that assist in the exotification of Asian women. The show addressed the derogatory "dragon lady" stereotype which poses Asian women as “strong and deceitful”. Graham attempted to tackle stereotypes both literally and figuratively by deconstructing traditional menswear and repurposing it in order to reflect the message of her show. She addressed "archetypes that exist within Japanese folklore, as well as Kabuki and Noh performance that appear to be focal points for...westerners." As with most of her shows, Graham constructed this one in a DIY sense. She found materials in unconventional places such as thrift shops and hardware stores, and pulled together scraps of material- most notably tuna fish cans- in an attempt to distort and reconfigure the concept of a runway show. Devan Diaz, a woman who has modeled in Graham's shows, notes how "there is no linear way to understand Gogo's aesthetic, and there are no trends you can trace in her shows."

Regarding runway models, Graham sources her friends and models she finds on Instagram who also identify as trans women, and encourages everyone to work as a collective on aspects of the show. She explains of this approach, "I only use trans models because trans aesthetic can only be expressed authentically by trans people." This a recurring theme in most of Graham's work; community is valued highly and Graham seeks to empower trans women by giving them a platform for creativity and self-expression. In pursuit of this project, Graham has included the likes of other models and artists including Avie Acosta, Quay Dash, Serena Jara, Sofia Moreno, and Hari Nef, who are all advocates for transgender rights as well. Graham's designs and production process involve the designer, model and consumer in a relationship that seeks to mutually empower. She explains, "my designs are developed with the trans femmes I dress in mind, so their individual presences permeate the designs and become inextricably linked to the garments and the look."

Graham's most recent collection is her AW18 show titled "Vicky's Secret" and features an exploration of polka-dot patterns.

== Industry perception ==
Models working within the industry have voiced appreciation for Graham's inclusive vision and individualized approach to fashion. Model Devan Diaz says that, "when the show was over, I felt as though I gained new tools of protection that I could take into the world." Graham's AW16 show "moved more than a handful of audience members to tears-including Hari Nef, who noted the power of seeing something by and for trans women". Critics have praised Graham's for her catering to individual identity and atypical approach to fashion that focuses on the model's needs. Jillian Billard states "the garments appear to fuse naturally with each model’s personality and beauty". Christina Di Biase notes of Graham's designs that they reflect her awareness of “the power of attention, which can ignite conversation and visibility".

== Political views ==
As a trans woman, Graham's experiences within a marginalized community heavily influence her political views and have inspired her to lobby for change. Graham is an advocate against the ongoing transphobia that sometimes results in acts of aggression and violence, particularly for trans people of color. She experiences this herself as she explains, "I officially identify as mixed race...I do have Japanese ancestry." She recognizes that “for trans women of color, they have to deal with gender identity and the intersectionality of white supremacy." Graham rejects trans fashion as a trendy buzzword that sees the movement as one that will serve its purpose and fade into the background. She instead rallies for its right to a legitimate place in the future of fashion. Addressing cultural issues such as feminine objectification, orientalism, and exoticism, her designs confront the heteronormative discourse that she believes is persistent in the fashion industry. She explains, “I can only hope that my own identity and skills can be used as tools to help relay the urgency of that message". Graham's thoughts on identity politics shape a majority of her work, namely her stylistic choices and messages behind shows like Dragon Lady.
