= Steven Cuffie =

American photographer (1949–2014)

- Born: 1949; North Carolina, U.S.
- Died: 2014 (aged 64–65); Baltimore, Maryland, U.S.
- Education: University of Maryland (attended)
- Occupation: Photographer
- Known for: Portraits of Black life in 1970s Baltimore

Steven Cuffie (1949, North Carolina – 2014, Baltimore, Maryland) was an American photographer known for portraits of his community in 1970s Baltimore.

== Work ==
Cuffie took an interest in photography as an adolescent. He studied photography at the University of Maryland for three years before leaving to work as a photographer. Cuffie connected with a group of other photographers working in Baltimore. He showed his work in Baltimore galleries and took commissioned assignments. Cuffie's photography revolved around portraits. He photographed children on the street and took personal images of women in their homes and his studio. For most of his career, Cuffie worked as a photographer for the City of Baltimore, shooting public events, crime scenes, and other happenings around the city. In 1982, Cuffie had his first child, and the content of his work changed from his earlier focus on portraits of women, but he continued developing his photography until his death in 2014. In 2022, New York Life Gallery held a posthumous solo show of his work, Women, his first show since the 1980s and his first outside of Baltimore.

== Exhibitions ==
- 2022 – Women, New York Life Gallery, New York City

== Publications ==
- Women. New York, NY: New York Life Gallery, 2023. (zine) (Note: Women (publisher's description))
- Baltimore Portraits. New York, NY: Dashwood Books, 2023. (Note: Baltimore Portraits (publisher's description))
- Karen: 1979. New York, NY: New York Life Gallery, 2024. (zine) (Note: Karen: 1979 (publisher's description))
