= Casil McArthur =

American fashion model (born 1999)

- Born: 1999 (age 26–27)
- Occupations: Model; activist
- Years active: 2009–present
- Modeling information
- Agency: Soul Artist Management

Casil McArthur (born 1999) is an American fashion model and transgender activist.

== Early life ==
McArthur was raised in Estes Park, Colorado. He began modeling at the age of 10 as a female model, working in the industry for several years before beginning his gender transition at age 16. During his youth, he participated in cosplay, which he later cited as a significant outlet for exploring his gender identity before coming out.

== Career ==
In 2015, McArthur transitioned and signed with Soul Artist Management. He gained significant attention after being photographed by Steven Meisel for W.

He has walked the runway for several major fashion houses, including Coach, Marc Jacobs, and Kenzo. His editorial work includes features in Vogue, i-D, Dazed, and Interview. In 2017, he was featured in a prominent Calvin Klein campaign shot by photographer Collier Schorr, which documented his transition.
