= Kehrer Verlag =

German art book publisher

- Status: Active
- Founded: 1995
- Founder: Klaus Kehrer
- Country of origin: Germany
- Headquarters location: Mannheimer Str. 175, 69123 Heidelberg, Germany
- Distribution: Stuttgarter Verlagskontor (Germany); AVA (Switzerland); Consortium Book Sales & Distribution (North America); Turnaround Publisher Services (UK)
- Publication types: Books
- Nonfiction topics: Fine art, photography, culture, sound art
- Official website: www.kehrerverlag.com

Kehrer Verlag is an art book publisher based in Heidelberg, Germany, specializing in photography, fine art, and sound art. Its books are produced in cooperation with Kehrer Design, the affiliated office for design and image processing.

== History ==
The publishing house was founded by Klaus Kehrer in Heidelberg in 1995. Since 2005, its headquarters was a loft in the Heinsteinwerk in Heidelberg, a former ceramic factory built in 1912. It has since moved.

From 2010 to 2013, Kehrer Verlag operated a showroom in Prenzlauer Berg in Berlin, where book presentations and artist talks were organized regularly.

In 2014, Kehrer Galerie opened at Potsdamerstr. 100 in Berlin. The works of German and international photographers were presented here in temporary exhibitions. Since May 2019, the gallery premises—now spearheaded by Erik Spiekermann and under the name Analog—have become a showroom for special books, where new publications and backlist titles from the program of Kehrer Verlag are presented and can be purchased.

Kehrer Verlag is a member of the Börsenverein des Deutschen Buchhandels. From 2011 to 2016, it was the German partner of the European Publishers Award for Photography (EPAP), an initiative of European publishing houses to promote contemporary photography. The winning project was announced at the Rencontres d’Arles and published simultaneously in book form in five countries.

Since 2014, Kehrer Verlag has been a partner of the Nordic Dummy Award (NDA), an initiative of Fotogalleriet Oslo and the Norwegian Association of Fine Art Photographers. The NDA is awarded periodically to young photo artists whose projects focus on the Nordic countries.

From 2014 to 2017, Kehrer Verlag also participated as a sponsor and project partner in the C/O Berlin Talent Award, a promotional prize that honors a tandem of young photographers and art critics under thirty-five years old; altogether, ten books were published as part of the Talent Award.

== Publishing program ==
Kehrer Verlag publishes roughly eighty new titles each year. In addition to regular photobooks, it publishes collector’s editions.

Among the photographers and artists whose works have been published by Kehrer Verlag are: Christopher Anderson, Ragnar Axelsson, Elina Brotherus, Paul Cézanne, Robert Delauney, Matthieu Gafsou, Bruce Gilden, Guido Guidi, Oskar Kokoschka, Saul Leiter, Helen Levitt, Sarah Moon, Nicholas Nixon, Anders Petersen, Kenji Toma, Julius Shulman, Fiona Tan, Donald Wexler and Tariq Zaidi.

Institutions with which Kehrer Verlag cooperates include the Museum Tinguely in Basel, the Deichtorhallen in Hamburg, the Städel Museum in Frankfurt am Main, and the Versicherungskammer Kulturstiftung in Munich, as well as the Albertina and the Kunstforum in Vienna.

== Awards ==
Over the years, numerous Kehrer publications have been nominated and awarded at national and international book awards, among them the following: Deutsche Fotobuchpreis, Die Schönsten Deutschen Bücher der Stiftung Buchkunst, DAM Award, Paris Photo Aperture Foundation Photo Book Award, Rencontres d'Arles Book Award, Kraszna-Krausz Book Award, Lucie Awards, PhotoESPAÑA, Finnish Fotobook Award, Svenska Fotobokspriset,

Red Dot Award, DDC Award Gute Gestaltung and Type Directors Club Award.
