= Feng Li =

Chinese photographer, based in Chengdu

Feng Li (simplified Chinese: 冯立; traditional Chinese: 馮立, born 1971) is a Chinese photographer, based in Chengdu. He is a street photographer and (more recently) a fashion photographer, as well as working a day job as a photographer for the Sichuan provincial department of communication.

Feng's long-term ongoing series of street photography, White Night, has been published in a book and shown in solo exhibitions at Nanjing University of the Arts Museum in Nanjing, China, Galerie Oberkampf in Paris, and at Rencontres d'Arles in Arles, France. It has won him the Best Photographer Prize at Jinan International Photo Biennale, the Grand Jury Prize at Lianzhou Photo Festival, and the Discovery Award at the Jimei x Arles International Photography Festival, all in China.

== Life and work ==
Feng was born and raised in the city of Chengdu in Sichuan province, southwestern China. He studied traditional Chinese medicine.

He took up photography in 1996, then got a civil service job working as a photographer for the Sichuan provincial department of communication. The job involves "photographing technological hubs, high tech factories, and CEOs".

Feng's long-term ongoing series of flash-lit colour photographs, mostly of people, is titled White Night. It comprises mostly candid street photography but also photos of people he knows. Work made for the series in Chengdu between 2005 and 2015 was published as a book in 2017.

In 2018 he also did some fashion photography.

== Publications ==
- 白夜 = White Night. Ningbo, China: Jiazazhi, 2017. Edition of 1000 copies. ISBN 978-988-14575-1-6.
  - Second edition. Ningbo, China: Jiazazhi, 2018. Edition of 1000 copies. "This second edition is slightly smaller in size and features higher-quality paper as well as higher-quality printing."
- White Night in Paris. Self-published, 2018. Twenty-four 15×10 cm prints of photographs of Paris. Edition of 80 copies.
- White Night in Berlin. Self-published, 2019. Twenty-four 15×10 cm prints of photographs of Berlin. Edition of 80 copies.
- Pig. Self-published, 2020. Twenty-four 15×10 cm prints of photographs of pigs. Edition of 80 copies.
- Good Night. Ningbo, China: Jiazazhi, 2022. ISBN 978-4-909442-29-1.

== Solo exhibitions ==
- White Night, Nanjing University of the Arts Museum, Nanjing, China, 2016
- White Night, Galerie Oberkampf, Paris, 2017
- Rencontres d'Arles, Arles, France, 2018

== Awards ==
- 2012: Best Photographer Prize, Jinan International Photo Biennale, Jinan, China
- 2012: Grand Jury Prize, Lianzhou Photo Festival, Lianzhou, China
- 2017: Jimei x Arles Discovery Award, Jimei x Arles International Photography Festival, Jimei district, Xiamen, China
