= Valentina Sampaio =

Brazilian fashion model (born 1996)

- Born: 10 December 1996 (age 29); Aquiraz, Ceará, Brazil
- Occupations: Model, actress
- Years active: 2016–present
- Modeling information
- Height: 1.77 m (5 ft 9 1/2 in)
- Hair color: Brown
- Eye color: Green
- Agency: The Lions (New York); Women Management (Paris); Elite Milan (Milan); Premier Model Management (London); Uno Models (Barcelona); MINT Artist Management (Berlin); Scoop Models (Copenhagen); Select Model Management Stockholm (Stockholm); METRO Models (Zurich); Mega Model Brazil (São Paulo); Chic Management (Sydney)

Valentina Sampaio (born 10 December 1996) is a Brazilian model and actress. She became Victoria's Secret's first openly transgender model in August 2019, and became the Sports Illustrated Swimsuit Issue's first openly transgender model in 2020. In 2024, she and Alex Consani became the first two transgender women to walk in the Victoria's Secret Fashion Show.

== Early life ==
Valentina Sampaio was born in a fishing village in Aquiraz, Ceará, which is in Northeastern Brazil. Her mother is a schoolteacher and her father is a fisherman. Valentina Sampaio is of African, Dutch and Native Brazilian descent.

At eight years of age, her psychologist identified her as transgender, but she did not start calling herself Valentina until she was 12. She has said in many interviews that she was not bullied for her gender identification. A 2017 New York Times profile of Sampaio mentioned that her parents "were always supportive and are very proud" of her, and her classmates were also very accepting because she said that "they already saw me as a little girl."

Sampaio studied architecture in Fortaleza, but she dropped out at 16 to study fashion. It was there that a makeup artist discovered her and signed her with a São Paulo modeling agency.

== Modeling career ==
In 2014, a clothing company fired Sampaio from her first modeling job because of her transgender identification. Although she was supposed to be in one of their ad campaigns, the company – which she has not disclosed – told her that the brand was conservative and its clients would not be receptive to a transgender model. Despite this hurdle at the very beginning of her career, she left her home state of Ceará for the first time to act in an independent film in Rio de Janeiro that later debuted at São Paulo Fashion Week.

In November 2016, she walked her first runway at São Paulo Fashion Week. Soon after, L'Oréal made a short film about Sampaio, which they released on International Women's Day, and later the company made her one of the company's brand ambassadors. She is a L'Oréal Paris spokeswoman along with several other Brazilian women including: Grazi Massafera, Taís Araújo, Juliana Paes, Isabeli Fontana, Emanuela de Paula, Agatha Moreira and Sophia Abrahão.

In February 2017, Sampaio received international media attention after appearing on the cover of Vogue Paris and becoming the first transgender model to appear on the magazine's cover. Later that year, she also appeared on the covers of Vogue Brasil and Vogue Germany. She is the first openly transgender woman to be featured on both magazines' covers as well. Other magazine cover appearances of Sampaio's include Vanity Fair Italia, Elle Mexico, and L'Officiel Turkiye. She has also worked with brands such as Dior, H&M, Marc Jacobs, Moschino, L'Oréal, and Philipp Plein. She is now signed with New York modeling agency The Lions.

On August 2, 2019, Sampaio indicated her association with Victoria's Secret PINK on her Instagram account, making her the first openly transgender Victoria's Secret model. Her agent confirmed that VS PINK had hired Sampaio for a catalog photo shoot to be released sometime in August 2019.

In 2020, Sampaio became the first transgender model to appear in Sports Illustrated. In late 2021, she became an Armani Beauty Ambassador.

Sampaio attended the Met Gala in 2021, wearing Iris van Herpen.

On October 15, 2024, Sampaio and Alex Consani became the first two transgender models to walk in the Victoria's Secret Fashion Show.

== Advocacy ==
She is a dedicated advocate for transgender equality and awareness, actively working to combat discrimination against transgender individuals in her home country.

== Filmography ==
=== Television ===
Year	Title	Character
2017	A Força do Querer ("Force of Will", English title Edge of Desire)	Herself

=== Film ===
Year	Title	Character
2017	Berenice Procura	Isabelle
