= Christopher Anderson (photographer) =

American photographer

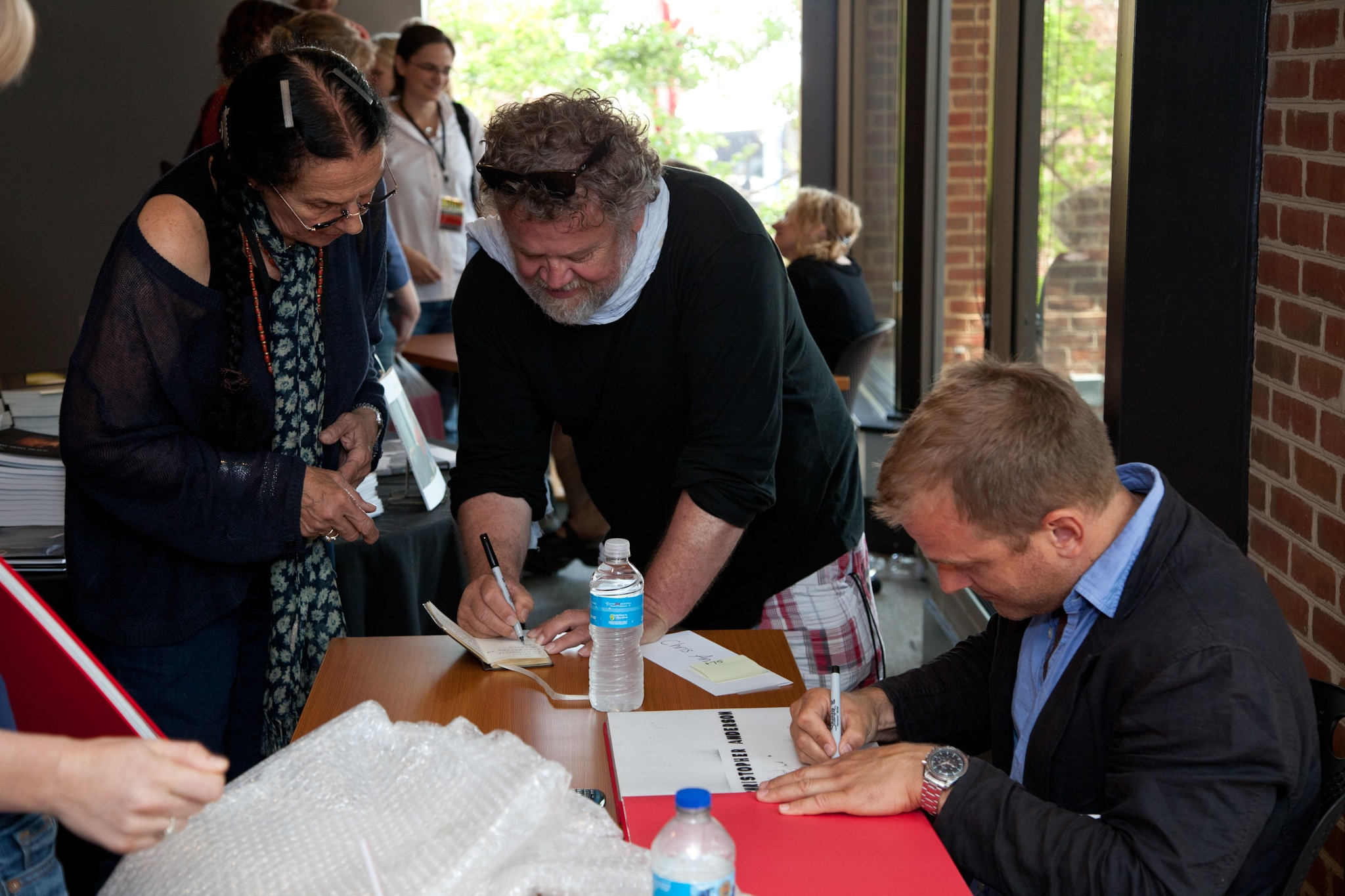
Anderson (right) with Mary Ellen Mark and Antonín Kratochvíl

Christopher Anderson (born 1970) is an American photographer. He was a member of Magnum Photos.

== Early life ==
Anderson was born in Kelowna, British Columbia, Canada. He grew up in the west Texas town of Abilene.

== Career ==
Christopher Anderson first gained recognition for his pictures in 1999 when he boarded a small wooden boat with Haitian refugees trying to sail to America. The boat, named the "Believe in God", sank in the Caribbean. In 2000 the images from that journey received the Robert Capa Gold Medal.

Anderson's early work from conflict zones such as Afghanistan, Iraq, Lebanon and Israel/ Palestine earned international acclaim and awards such as two World Press Photo Awards and Magazine Photographer of the Year.

In 2004, Anderson began traveling to Venezuela to document the country under the presidency of Hugo Chávez. The resulting book, Capitolio (RM 2009) was named one of the best photographic books of 2010 at the Kassels book Festival in Germany. In 2011, Anderson made Capitolio into an app for iPhone and iPad, the first photographic book to be made into an application for such devices. His current work crosses genres, from documentary to art to portraiture of celebrities (such as Lady Gaga) and fashion.

Anderson was one of the early members of the VII Photo Agency that was formed by photographers James Nachtwey and Antonín Kratochvíl in 2001. He resigned from the agency in 2004 and joined Magnum Photos in 2005. He has served as a contract photographer for Newsweek and National Geographic magazines and was the first "Photographer in Residence" at New York Magazine, working with editors Adam Moss and Jody Quon.

Anderson received attention for his photos of members of the Trump Administration published in Vanity Fair in December 2025. In an interview, he described the unpolished, candid style as an "attempt to circumnavigate the stage-managed image of politics…" and noted, "[t]his has been a fixture of my work for many years. I've photographed all political stripes just like this."

== Books ==
- Nonfiction. DeMo, 2003. ISBN 978-0970576811.
- Capitolio. RM, 2009. ISBN 978-84-92480-57-9.
- Sete # 12. Images En Manœuvres, 2012. ISBN 978-2849952337.
- Stump. RM, 2013, ISBN 978-84-15118-56-5.
- Son. Heidelberg: Kehrer, 2013. ISBN 978-3-86828-390-7.
- Approximate Joy. Stanley Barker, 2018. ISBN 978-0-9955555-9-4
  - First edition, Stanley Barker, September 2018.
  - Second edition, Stanley Barker, December 2018.
- Pia. Stanley Barker, 2020. ISBN 978-1-913288-15-0.
  - Second edition. Stanley Barker, 2021.
- Marlon. Stanley Barker. 2022. ISBN 978-1-913288-50-1.

== Awards ==
- Kodak Young Photographer of the Year (1999)
- Nominated for the Pulitzer Prize by The New York Times Magazine (2000)
- Robert Capa Gold Medal (2000)
- Magazine Photographer of the Year (2005)
- Getty Grant (2008)
- World Press Photo (2007)
- World Press Photo (2008)

== Exhibitions ==
=== Solo ===
- 2003 – Nonfiction, InCamera, New York
- 2010 – Capitolio
  - ImageSingulieres, Sete, France
  - Milk Gallery, New York
- 2010 – Moda, Moscow Contemporary Art Center Winzavod, Moscow, Russia
- 2011 – Son, LOOK3 Festival of the Photograph, Charlottesville, Virginia
- 2012 – Son, Magnum Gallery, Paris

=== Group ===
- 2004
  - Inviati di Guerra – otto reportages fotografici 1991-2003 - Scavi Scaligeri. Centro Internazionale di Fotografia, Verona
  - War by VII / Usa – Afghanistan – Iraq - War Photo Limited, Dubrovnik
  - War – New York, Kabul, Baghdad - Visual Gallery photokina, Köln
- 2006 – Off Broadway - PAC Padiglione d'Arte Contemporanea, Milan
- 2008 – Magnum Photos 60 years - Stedelijk Museum Amsterdam
- 2009
  - Magnum Contemporary – Future Icons - Atlas Gallery, London
  - Bitter Fruit: Pictures from Afghanistan - Magnum Print Room, London
  - Prix Pictet, Photography Prize 2009 - Purdy Hicks Gallery, London
  - Prix Pictet 2009 Shortlist – Earth - Passage de Retz, Paris
- 2010
  - Earth Tracks - Thessaloniki Museum of Photography, Thessaloninki
  - Prix Pictet – Earth - Gallery of Photography, Dublin
  - Nominierung Prix Pictet 2009: Earth - Galerie Caprice Horn, Berlin
  - Magnum. Shifting Media. New Role of Photography - C/O Berlin, Berlin
  - Prix Pictet - Fondazione Forma per la Fotografia, Milan
