= Lily Nova =

Australian model

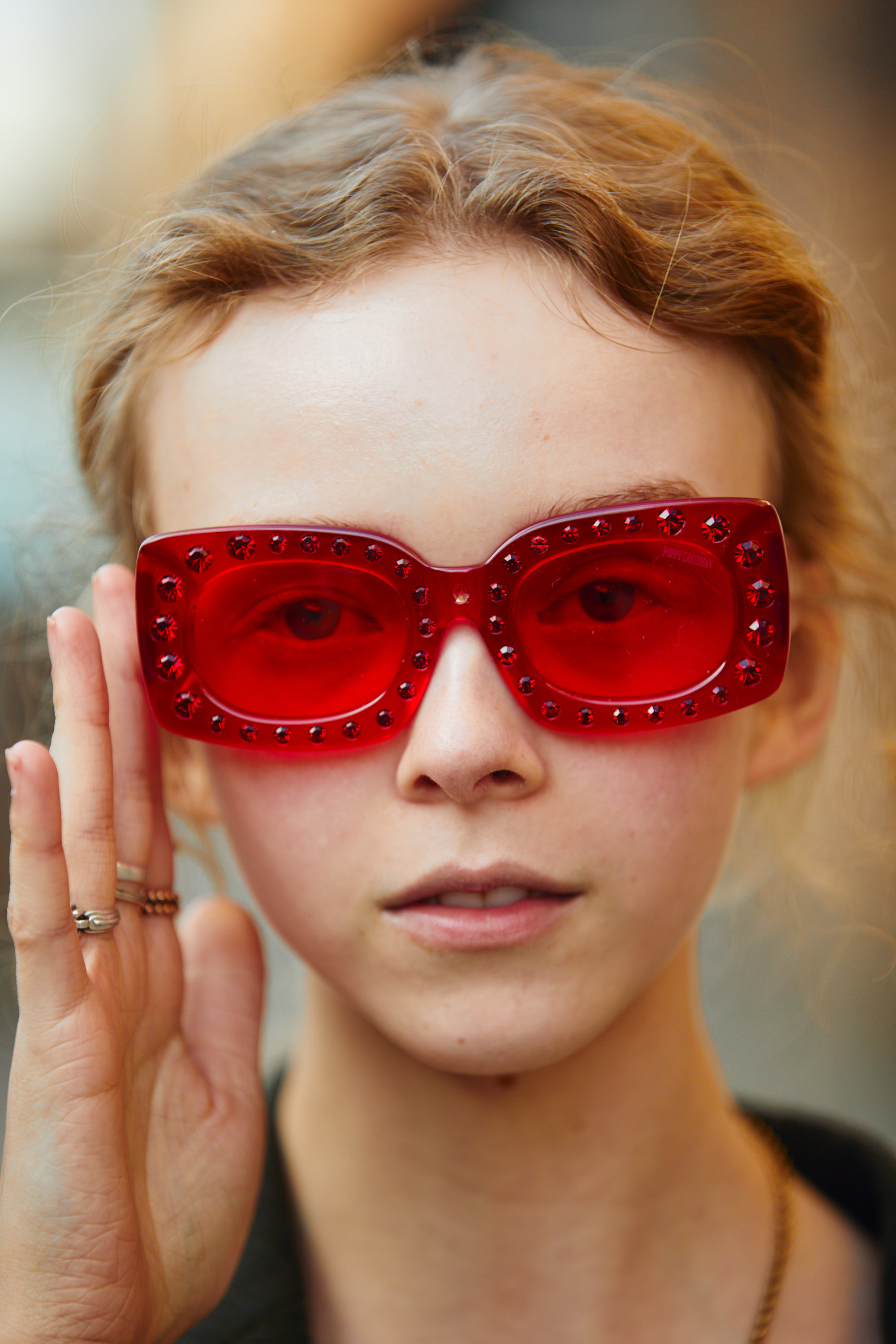
- Born: Adelaide, Australia
- Occupation(s): Model and actor
- Modeling information
- Height: 1.75 m (5 ft 9 in)
- Hair color: Strawberry blonde
- Eye color: Blue
- Agency: IMG Models (Paris, Sydney); One Management (New York)

Lily Nova is an Australian fashion model.

== Career ==
Nova was discovered at a fashion event in Australia, and debuted at Gucci's F/W 2016 show. She also walked for Miu Miu, Marc Jacobs, Bottega Veneta, Sonia Rykiel, and John Galliano that season. Nova has appeared in multiple Miu Miu campaigns. Nova has modelled in editorials for W, Vogue, Vogue Japan, Vogue Ukraine, and British Vogue among others.

Nova currently ranks on the "Hot List" on models.com She was chosen as a "Top Newcomer" for the F/W 2017 season. Nova is known for her doll-like features.
