= David Strettell =

Bookstore owner

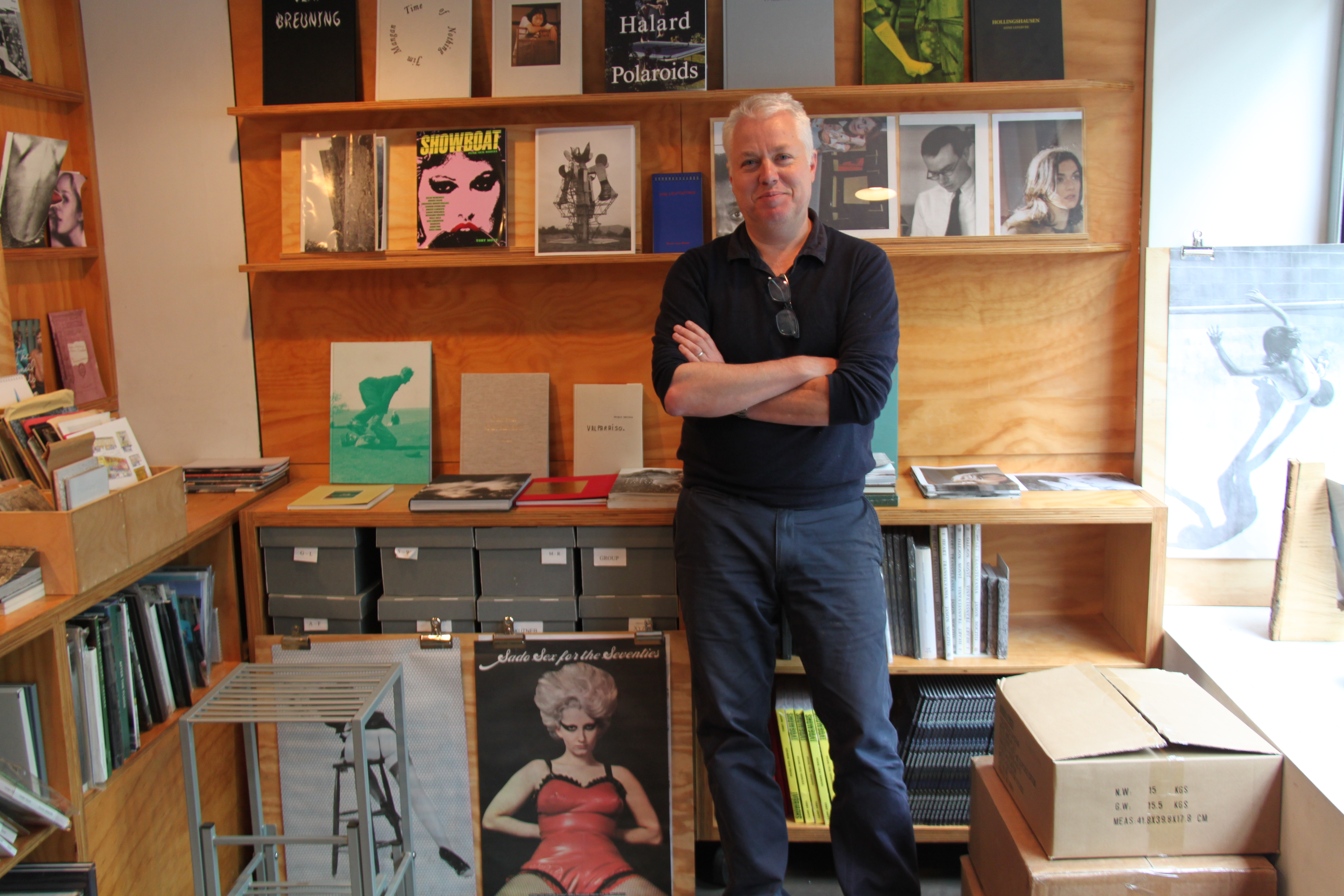
- Strettell at Dashwood Books, 2017
- Occupation: Bookstore owner
- Known for: Founder of Dashwood Books
- Spouse: Ann Christiansen
- Children: 1
- Website: dashwoodbooks.com

David Strettell is the English founder and owner of the New York-based independent bookstore Dashwood Books. Before this, Strettell was assistant to photographer Mario Testino, and then was cultural director of Magnum Photos for 12 years.

== Dashwood Books ==
Dashwood opened in 2005. The word "Dashwood" is a "family name." The focus of Japanese bookstores on specific subjects inspired Dashwood's focus on photography. When founded, Dashwood sold only photography books, and was the only bookstore in New York City to do so. Dashwood also publishes photography books, including limited-edition monographs.

Tokyo native Miwa Susuda is Dashwood's manager, and is known for her ability to understand her clients' taste and recommend books to them.

== Personal life ==
Strettell is married to Ann Christiansen and is the father of one.
