= Daniel Riera =

Daniel Riera (1970) is an artist and commercial photographer.

== About ==
Riera (Olot, Spain) studied fine arts and cinema at the University of Barcelona and EMAV (Escola De Mitjans Audiovisuals). Riera’s work has been shown at Les Rencontres d’Arles, Deichtorhallen/Haus of Photography in Hamburg, La Virreina Centre de la Imatge in Barcelona, Foam Fotografiemuseum Amsterdam, Casa de Costa in New York and extensively in his native Spain since the year 2000. He lives in Barcelona.

== Career ==
Riera’s portraits and fashion commissions have appeared in magazines including Fantastic Man, Vogue Hommes International, The Gentlewoman, Hercules, Kid's Wear, V, V Man, GQ (international versions in the UK, Germany, Italy, Australia, China and Spain), Vamp, Butt (magazine), Les Cahiers Purple, Fanzine 137, EY!, Candy, El País Semanal and Das Magazin.

He has made commercial work for brands including Adidas, Canali, Dior, Mühlbauer and Spastor, among others.

== Publications ==
=== Publication by Riera ===
- Riera / Tengiz. EY! Boy Collection, 2015

=== Publications with contributions by Riera ===
- The A-Z of Spanish Photographers (La Fábrica, 2013)
- The Art Of Fashion Photography by Patrick Remy (Prestel, 2014)
- Fashion Photography Next by Magdalene Keaney (Thames & Hudson, 2014)
- Forever Butt (Taschen, 2014)
- Fantastic Man (Phaidon, 2015)
