= International Chrysis =

American entertainer (1951–1990)

- Born: 1951; New York City, US
- Died: 26 March 1990 (aged 38–39); New York City, US
- Occupations: Drag queen, actress, muse

International Chrysis (1951 – 26 March 1990) was an American transgender entertainer and protégé of Salvador Dalí. She also played the damsel in distress in the music video for Van Halen's version of "(Oh) Pretty Woman".

== Life and career ==
International Chrysis was a member of the Hot Peaches troupe and appeared briefly in the 1968 documentary The Queen. She toured drag supper clubs in the 1970s and moved her show to nightclubs in the 1980s, performing her revues Jesus Chrysis Superstar and The Last Temptation of Chrysis. She appeared in the 1990 film Q&A shortly before her death. A documentary about her life entitled Split: Portrait of a Drag Queen was released posthumously. Dead or Alive briefly recorded under the name "International Chrysis" in her honor.

== Death ==
Chrysis was receiving "substandard transgender healthcare" early in her transition. To receive breast augmentation, she was injected with a wax that hardened into painful lumps and that eventually seeped into her bloodstream. That seepage contributed to a fatal case of cancer in her lungs, liver, and breasts. She died on March 26, 1990.
