= International Best Dressed Hall of Fame List =

List of persons

The International Best Dressed Hall of Fame List was created and edited by the fashion publicist Eleanor Lambert in 1940 for the American magazine Vanity Fair as an attempt to boost the reputation of American fashion. Vanity Fair took charge of the list after Lambert left the responsibility to "four friends at Vanity Fair" in 2002, a year before her death.

== International Best-Dressed List ==
Year	Category	Person
1940, 1941, 1943, 1946, 1947, 1948, 1949, 1956, 1957	Best Dressed Women, Hall of Fame	Mona von Bismarck
1940, 1945, 1946, 1947, 1948	Best Dressed Women	Millicent Rogers
1940, 1941, 1946	Best Dressed Women	Elizabeth Sherley, wife of Tom Shevlin
1940, 1941, 1943, 1944, 1945, 1946, 1947, 1949, 1950, 1951, 1952, 1953, 1954, 1955	Best Dressed Women	Thelma Chrysler, heiress of Walter Chrysler
1940	Best Dressed Women	Barbara Hutton
1940, 1941, 1944, 1945, 1946, 1947, 1948, 1949, 1950, 1951, 1952, 1953, 1954, 1955, 1956, 1957, 1974	Best Dressed Women, Hall of Fame, Super Dresser of Our Time	Babe Paley
1940	Best Dressed Women	Lucy McCormick Blair
1940	Best Dressed Women	Gladys Swarthout
1940, 1947	Best Dressed Women	Ina Claire
1940, 1965	Best Dressed Women, Hall of Fame	Kathryn Bache Miller
1940, 1943, 1945	Best Dressed Women	Jennie Frances "Jane" Marston, wife of Lawrence Tibbett
1940	Best Dressed Women	Lynn Fontanne
1940, 1944	Best Dressed Women	Minna Kent Legare, wife of the heir of Sidney Kent, a founder of the Union Stock Yards
1940, 1943, 1954	Best Dressed Women	Margaret Thayer, wife of Harold E. Talbott
1940, 1944, 1946, 1947	Best Dressed Women	Janet Newbold
1941, 1943, 1944, 1945, 1946, 1947, 1948, 1949, 1950, 1951, 1952, 1953, 1954, 1955, 1956, 1957	Best Dressed Women, Hall of Fame	Wallis Simpson
1941, 1996	Best Dressed Women, Hall of Fame- Women	Aimée de Heeren
1941	Best Dressed Women	Courtney Letts
1941	Best Dressed Women	Missus Robert W. Miller
1941	Best Dressed Women	Madeline Hurlock
1941, 1943, 1945, 1956, 1964	Best Dressed Women, Hall of Fame	Rosalind Russell
1943, 1944, 1945, 1946, 1954, 1985	Best Dressed Women, Hall of Fame- Women	Clare Boothe Luce
1943, 1954	Best Dressed Women	Pauline Vandervoort Rogers, wife of Walter Hoving
1943, 1944, 1948, 1950	Best Dressed Women	the wife of Andre Embiricos
1943	Best Dressed Women	Soong Mei-ling
1943	Best Dressed Women	Lily Pons
1944	Best Dressed Women	Muriel Fillans "Molly" Lane, wife of Michael Grace Phipps
1944, 1946, 1947, 1948, 1949, 1950	Best Dressed Women	Slim Keith
1945, 1946, 1947, 1948, 1949, 1950, 1951, 1952, 1953, 1954, 1955, 1956	Best Dressed Women, High Runners-up, Best Dressed Women Fashion Professionals	Valentina
1944	Best Dressed Women	Louise Gill Macy, wife of Harry Hopkins
1944	Best Dressed Women	Felicia Schiff Warburg, wife of Robert Sarnoff
1946, 1947, 1948, 1949, 1950, 1951, 1952, 1953, 1958	High Runners-up, Best Dressed Women Fashion Professionals	Janet Gaynor
1946	High Runners-up	Leonora Corbett
1947, 1948, 1949, 1950, 1951, 1953, 1954	Best Dressed Women, Best Dressed Women Fashion Professionals	Natalia Pavlovna Paley
1947	Best Dressed Women	Jane Shonnaro, wife of Geoffrey Gates
1947, 1948, 1949, 1950, 1951, 1952, 1953, 1954, 1955, 1958, 1959, 1960, 1961, 1962, 1963, 1964, 1966	Best Dressed Women Fashion Professionals, Hall of Fame	Sophie Gimbel
1947, 1951, 1952, 1953	Best Dressed Women Fashion Professionals	Carrie Munn, wife of Orson Desaix Munn II
1948, 1951, 1953, 1954, 1955	Best Dressed Women	Jeanne Lourdes Murray, wife of Alfred Gwynne Vanderbilt Jr.
1948, 1949, 1950, 1951, 1952, 1953, 1954, 1955, 1956, 1957, 1958	Best Dressed Women, Hall of Fame	Austine Byrne McDonnell, wife of William Randolph Hearst Jr.
1948, 1949, 1951, 1952, 1956, 1960	Best Dressed Women, Hall of Fame	Princess Marina of Greece and Denmark
1948, 1949, 1950, 1951, 1952, 1953, 1954, 1957, 1958, 1961	Best Dressed Women	Hélène Ostrowska, wife of Louis Arpels
1948, 1951, 1952	Best Dressed Women Fashion Professionals	Gene Tierney
1949, 1953, 1957	Best Dressed Women, Hall of Fame	Mary Martin
1949, 1975	Best Dressed Women, Hall of Fame- Women	Adele Astaire
1949, 1972, 2004	Best Dressed Women Fashion Professionals	Maxime de la Falaise
1950	Best Dressed Women	Sloan Simpson
1950	Best Dressed Women	Faye Emerson
1950, 1951	Best Dressed Women, Best Dressed Women Fashion Professionals	Gloria Swanson
1951, 1957	Best Dressed Women, Hall of Fame	Irene Dunne
1951, 1952, 1956	Best Dressed Women	Marlene Dietrich
1951	Best Dressed Women	Jean MacArthur
1951	Best Dressed Women	Cecilia DeGolyer, wife of George C. McGhee
1951, 1953, 1955, 1956, 1957, 1958, 1967, 1972, 1973	Best Dressed Women, Hall of Fame, Hall of Fame- Women	Cristina Ford
1951, 1953, 1954, 1955, 1956, 1958	Best Dressed Women	Princess Margaret, Countess of Snowdon
1951	Best Dressed Women	the wife of Count Uberto Corti
1951, 1952, 1953, 1954, 1955	Best Dressed Women Fashion Professionals	Geneviève Boucher, wife of Jacques Fath
1951, 1953, 1954, 1957, 1963, 1964, 1966	Best Dressed Women Fashion Professionals, Hall of Fame	Margaret Case, a contributing editor at Vogue
1951, 1952, 1953, 1954, 1956, 1958, 1959	Best Dressed Women Fashion Professionals	Isabella Mandel, wife of the founder of Mandel Brothers Department Store
1952, 1953, 1955, 1956, 1957, 1958	Best Dressed Women, Hall of Fame	C. Z. Guest
1952, 1955, 1956, 1957, 1958, 1966	Best Dressed Women, Hall of Fame	Consuelo Crespi
1952, 1953, 1954, 1956	Best Dressed Women, Best Dressed Women Fashion Professionals	the wife of Henri Bonnet
1952	Best Dressed Women	Mamie Eisenhower
1952, 1953, 1955	Best Dressed Women	Oveta Culp Hobby
1952	Best Dressed Women Fashion Professionals	Bettina Ballard, fashion editor at Vogue
1952, 1953, 1955	Best Dressed Women Fashion Professionals	Nena Manach, wife of Andrew Goodman
1954, 1955, 1960	Best Dressed Women, Hall of Fame	Patricia Lopez Huici, wife of Arturo López Willshaw
1954	Best Dressed Women	Frederica of Hanover
1954, 1955, 1956, 1959, 1960	Best Dressed Women, Hall of Fame	Grace Kelly
1954, 1955, 1957, 1960, 1961, 1962, 1963, 1964, 1966	Best Dressed Women Fashion Professionals, Hall of Fame	Diana Vreeland
1954, 1955, 1956, 1957, 1958, 1959, 1960, 1961, 1962, 1963, 1964, 1966	Best Dressed Women Fashion Professionals, Hall of Fame	Simonetta Colonna Di Cesarò, listed as Simonetta Fabiani, one of the organizers of Milan Fashion Week
1954, 1957, 1958, 1960, 1962, 1965, 1966	Best Dressed Women Fashion Professionals, Hall of Fame	Enid A. Haupt
1955, 1957	Best Dressed Women, Hall of Fame	Consuelo Vanderbilt
1955, 1956, 1957, 1958, 1961	Best Dressed Women, Hall of Fame	Aline Griffith, Countess of Romanones
1955, 1956, 1957, 1958, 1959, 1960, 1961, 1962, 1963, 1964, 1966	Best Dressed Women Fashion Professionals, Hall of Fame	Mary "Billie" Cantrell, wife of Stanley Marcus
1955, 1956, 1957, 1958, 1959, 1960	Best Dressed Women Fashion Professionals	Carmel Snow
1955	Best Dressed Women Fashion Professionals	Anne Fogarty
1955, 1956	Best Dressed Women Fashion Professionals	Phyllis Digby Morton
1956, 1957, 1958, 1959, 1960, 1961, 1980, 1987, 1991	Best Dressed Women, Hall of Fame, Citations, Special Citations	Audrey Hepburn
1956, 1957, 1959, 1960, 1961, 1962	Best Dressed Women Fashion Professionals, Best Dressed Women, Hall of Fame	Jacqueline de Ribes
1956	Best Dressed Women Fashion Professionals	Missus Katherine McManus, fashion editor at Vogue
1956	Best Dressed Women Fashion Professionals	Joan Escoboza, wife of the president of I. Magnin
1957	Best Dressed Women, Hall of Fame	Elizabeth II
1957	Best Dressed Women, Hall of Fame	Claudette Colbert
1957, 1958, 1959, 1960, 1961	Best Dressed Women, Hall of Fame	Rosita Winston, wife of a lover of Ghislaine de Polignac
1957, 1958, 1959	Best Dressed Women	Margaret de Crussol d'Uzès
1957, 1958, 1959, 1960, 1961, 1962, 1963, 1964, 1966	Best Dressed Women Fashion Professionals, Hall of Fame	Coco Chanel
1957	Best Dressed Women Fashion Professionals	Florence Pritchett
1957, 1958, 1960, 1961, 1962, 1965, 1966	Best Dressed Women Fashion Professionals, Hall of Fame	Sybil Connolly
1957, 1958, 1959, 1960, 1961, 1962, 1963, 1964, 1966	Best Dressed Women Fashion Professionals, Hall of Fame	Pauline Trigère
1958	Best Dressed Women	Kay Kendall
1958, 1963, 1964, 1965	Best Dressed Women, Hall of Fame	Dina Merrill
1958, 1959, 1960	Best Dressed Women, Hall of Fame	Merle Oberon
1958, 1959, 1961, 1962, 1964, 1966	Best Dressed Women Fashion Professionals, Hall of Fame	Anita May, wife of an heir of The May Department Stores Company
1959, 1960, 1961, 1962, 1963, 1992	Best Dressed Women, Hall of Fame, Enduring Images of Elegance	Marella Agnelli
1959, 1960, 1961, 1963, 1965, 1967	Best Dressed Women	Princess Alexandra, The Honourable Lady Ogilvy
1959, 1961, 1962, 1963	Best Dressed Women, Hall of Fame	Nicole Merenda, wife of Hervé Alphand
1959, 1962, 1963, 1964	Best Dressed Women, Hall of Fame	Eliza Gonçalves, wife of Walter Moreira Salles
1959, 1960, 1961, 1962, 1963, 1964	Best Dressed Women, Hall of Fame	Gloria Guinness
1959, 1960, 1961, 1962, 1963	Best Dressed Women, Hall of Fame	Dorinda Prest Dixon, wife of John Barry Ryan III
1959, 1965, 1966	Best Dressed Women Fashion Professionals, Hall of Fame	Irene Galitzine
1959, 1963, 1964, 1965, 1966	Best Dressed Women Fashion Professionals, Hall of Fame	Geraldine Stutz
1960, 1961, 1962, 1964, 1965, 1985, 1992	Best Dressed Women, Hall of Fame, Citations, Enduring Images of Elegance	Jacqueline Kennedy Onassis
1960, 1961, 1962, 1963, 1964	Best Dressed Women, Hall of Fame	Evangeline Bruce
1960	Best Dressed Women	Eugenia Livanos
1960, 1961, 1964, 1965	Best Dressed Women, Hall of Fame	Sirikit
1960, 1961, 1962, 1964, 1966	Best Dressed Women Fashion Professionals, Hall of Fame	Hélène Rochas
1961, 1962, 1963, 1964, 1967, 1987, 1996	Best Dressed Women, Best Dressed Women- International Fashion Industries, Hall of Fame- Women	Lee Radziwill
1961, 1962, 1963, 1964, 1965, 1997	Best Dressed Women, Hall of Fame	Jayne Wrightsman
1961	Best Dressed Women	Donna Antonella Bechi Piaggio
1962, 1963, 1964, 1965, 1967, 1968, 1969, 1970, 1992	Best Dressed Women, Most Imaginative Women in Current Fashion, Best Dressed Women in Private Life, Hall of Fame- Women, Enduring Images of Elegance	Gloria Vanderbilt
1962, 1964, 1965, 1966	Best Dressed Women, Best Dressed Women Fashion Professionals, Hall of Fame-Women	Isabel Nash, daughter of Ogden Nash
1962, 1963, 1966	Best Dressed Women	Fiona Campbell-Walter
1962, 1965, 1966	Best Dressed Women Fashion Professionals, Hall of Fame	Anita Colby
1962, 1963, 1964, 1965, 1966	Best Dressed Women Fashion Professionals, Hall of Fame	Mitzi Epstein, wife of Samuel Irving Newhouse Sr.
1963, 1976, 1977	Best Dressed Women, Hall of Fame- Women	Farah Pahlavi
1963, 1964, 1965	Best Dressed Women	Jean Harvey, wife of Alfred Gwynne Vanderbilt Jr.
1963, 1964, 1965, 1966, 1967, 1969, 1972	Best Dressed Women Fashion Professionals, Best Dressed Women in Fashion World, Hall of Fame- Women	Marilyn Evins, wife of David Evins, a founding member of the Council of Fashion Designers of America
1963, 1964, 1965	Best Dressed Women Fashion Professionals	Amy Greene, beauty editor at Glamour
1964, 1965	Best Dressed Women	Rose Kennedy
1964, 1965, 1969, 1970	Best Dressed Women, Best Dressed Women in Private Life, Hall of Fame- Women	Catherine Gerlach, wife of William McCormick Blair Jr.
1964, 1975	Best Dressed Women, Hall of Fame- Women	Rachel Lambert Mellon
1964, 1968, 1969, 1980	Best Dressed Women, Great Fashion Classicists of 1968, Hall of Fame- Women, Citations	Betsy Bloomingdale
1964, 1965, 1968	Best Dressed Women, Great Fashion Classicists of 1968	Anne Ford, heiress of Henry Ford II
1964, 1965, 1967, 1969	Best Dressed Women, Best Dressed Women in Private Life	Charlotte Ford, heiress of Henry Ford II
1964, 1965	Best Dressed Women Fashion Professionals	Dorothy Rodgers
1964	Best Dressed Women Fashion Professionals	Helena Rubinstein
1964, 1965	Best Dressed Women Fashion Professionals	the wife of textile manufacturer William Rose
1964, 1965, 1966	Best Dressed Women Fashion Professionals, Hall of Fame-Women	Mollie Parnis
1964, 1965, 1967	Best Dressed Women Fashion Professionals	Mary Quant
1964, 1965, 1966, 1968, 1969, 1976	Best Dressed Women Fashion Professionals, Best Dressed Women, Hall of Fame-Women, Most Imaginative Women in Current Fashion, Best Dressed Women in Fashion World	Robin Butler, London editor of Vogue
1964, 1966, 1967, 1969, 1971	Best Dressed Women Fashion Professionals, Best Dressed Women, Best Dressed Women in Fashion World	Gloria Schiff
1965	Hall of Fame	Margot Fonteyn
1965, 1967	Best Dressed Women	Susan Burden, wife of Carter Burden
1965, 1969, 1970	Best Dressed Women, Best Dressed Women in Private Life, Hall of Fame- Women	Anne Buydens
1965, 1968	Best Dressed Women, Most Imaginative Women in Current Fashion	Barbra Streisand
1965, 1968, 1972	Best Dressed Women, Great Fashion Classicists of 1968, Hall of Fame- Women	Jane Engelhard
1965, 1966, 1967	Best Dressed Women	Luciana Pignatelli
1965	Best Dressed Women	Queen Paola of Belgium
1965, 1966, 1967, 1969, 1970, 1971, 1972, 1975, 2000	Best Dressed Women Fashion Professionals, Best Dressed Women, Most Imaginative Women in Current Fashion, Best Dressed Women in Fashion World, Outstanding Examples of Elegance Without Ostentation- Women, Today's Symbol of Correct Yet Contemporary Dress, Hall of Fame- Women	Marisa Berenson
1965	Best Dressed Women Fashion Professionals	Emmanuelle Khanh
1965, 1966	Best Dressed Women Fashion Professionals, Best Dressed Women	Caterine Milinaire
1965	Best Dressed Women Fashion Professionals	a member of the Los Angeles fashion staff of Life, wife of Mark Miller
1966, 1967	Best Dressed Women, Best Dressed Women Fashion Professionals	Flavia Riggio, wife of Montague Hackett
1966, 1967, 1969, 1970, 1971, 1972, 1973	Best Dressed Women, Best Dressed Women in Fashion World, Best Dressed Women Fashion Professionals, Best Dressed Women Fashion Personalities, Hall of Fame- Women	Françoise de Langlade
1966, 1967, 1968, 1969, 1970, 1971, 1992	Best Dressed Women, Most Imaginative Women in Current Fashion, Best Dressed Women in Fashion World, Hall of Fame- Women, Enduring Images of Elegance	Nan Kempner
1966, 1970	Best Dressed Men, Hall of Fame- Men	Pierre Cardin
1966	Best Dressed Men	Norman Parkinson
1966, 1968, 1969, 1970, 1982, 1992	Best Dressed Men, Best Dressed Men Fashion Professionals, Hall of Fame- Men, Citations, Enduring Images of Elegance	Bill Blass
1966, 1969, 1970	Best Dressed Men, Best Dressed Men Fashion Professionals, Hall of Fame- Men	John Weitz
1966, 1970	Best Dressed Men, Hall of Fame- Men	Iva Patcevitch, president of Condé Nast
1966	Best Dressed Men	Patrick O'Higgins, assistant to Helena Rubinstein
1967, 1968, 1969, 1970, 1971	Best Dressed Women, Great Fashion Classicists of 1968, Best Dressed Women in Private Life, Hall of Fame- Women	Betsy Pickering, wife of Harilaos Theodoracopulos
1967, 1994	Best Dressed Women, Hall of Fame- Women	Robin Chandler Duke
1967, 2000	Best Dressed Women, Hall of Fame- Women	Lauren Bacall
1967	Best Dressed Women	Lynda Bird Johnson Robb
1967, 1970, 1971, 1972, 1973, 1980, 1985	Best Dressed Women, Hall of Fame- Women, Citations	Nancy Reagan
1967	Best Dressed Women	Faye Dunaway
1967, 1969	Best Dressed Women Fashion Professionals, Best Dressed Women in Fashion World	Veruschka von Lehndorff
1967, 1977, 1981	Best Dressed Women Fashion Professionals	Elieth Roux, couture director at Bergdorf Goodman
1967, 1986	Best Dressed Women Fashion Professionals	Meryll Orsini, wife of the great-nephew of Jeanne Lanvin
1967, 1968, 1969, 1970, 1971, 1972, 1976, 1978, 1980	Best Dressed Women Fashion Professionals, Most Imaginative Women in Current Fashion, Best Dressed Women in Fashion World, Best Dressed Women Fashion Personalities	Ellin Saltzman, wife of Renny Saltzman
1968, 1969, 1970, 1971	Great Fashion Classicists of 1968, Best Dressed Women in Private Life, Hall of Fame- Women	Lyn Revson, wife of Charles Revson
1968, 1969, 1972	Great Fashion Classicists of 1968, Best Dressed Women in Private Life, Hall of Fame- Women	Perla de Lucena-Mattison, wife of the lawyer of Barbara Hutton
1968	Great Fashion Classicists of 1968	Ira von Fürstenberg
1968, 1970, 1971, 1972	Great Fashion Classicists of 1968, Best Dressed Women, Hall of Fame- Women	Carroll McDaniel, wife of de Portago
1968, 1971, 1972, 1974, 1975, 1976	Great Fashion Classicists of 1968, Best Dressed Women, Hall of Fame- Women	Louise Liberman, wife of Savitt, Frederick Melhado
1968, 1970, 1975	Great Fashion Classicists of 1968, Best Dressed Women, Hall of Fame- Women	Danica ("Denise") Radosavljevic, wife of Vincente Minnelli, Prentis Cobb Hale
1968, 1973	Great Fashion Classicists of 1968, Outstanding Examples of Elegance Without Ostentation- Women	Antoinette Louise Schweisguth, wife of the Duke of Cadaval
1968, 1969, 1970, 1975	Great Fashion Classicists of 1968, Best Dressed Women in Private Life, Best Dressed Women, Hall of Fame- Women	Madame Ahmed Benhima, wife of a member of the Ministry of Foreign Affairs, African Cooperation and Moroccan Expatriates (Morocco)
1968	Most Imaginative Women in Current Fashion	Pauline de Rothschild
1968, 1969, 1971, 1992	Most Imaginative Women in Current Fashion, Best Dressed Women in Private Life, Hall of Fame- Women, Enduring Images of Elegance	Ioana Maria "Mica" Grecianu, wife of Ahmet Ertegun
1968, 1969, 1971	Most Imaginative Women in Current Fashion, Best Dressed Women in Private Life, Hall of Fame- Women	Katharine Rayner
1968, 1970	Most Imaginative Women in Current Fashion, Best Dressed Women	Diahann Carroll
1968	Most Imaginative Women in Current Fashion	Maya Plisetskaya
1968	Most Imaginative Women in Current Fashion	Marisol Escobar
1968, 1969, 1975	Best Dressed Men, Hall of Fame- Men	Prince Philip, Duke of Edinburgh
1968, 1969	Best Dressed Men	Wyatt Emory Cooper
1968, 1969, 1971	Best Dressed Men, Best Dressed Men Fashion Professionals, Hall of Fame- Men	Patrick Anson, 5th Earl of Lichfield
1968, 1969, 1975, 1976	Best Dressed Men, Hall of Fame- Men	George Stevens Hamilton
1968, 1970, 1971, 1972	Best Dressed Men, Hall of Fame- Men	Alexis von Rosenberg, Baron de Redé
1968	Best Dressed Men	George D. Widener Jr.
1968, 1970	Best Dressed Men, Hall of Fame- Men	Cecil Beaton
1968, 1969	Best Dressed Men	Jean-Claude Killy
1968, 1969, 1970, 1986	Best Dressed Men, Best Dressed Men Fashion Professionals, Hall of Fame- Men	Bernard Lanvin, great-nephew of Jeanne Lanvin
1968, 1970	Best Dressed Men, Hall of Fame- Men	Count Rodolfo Crespi, husband of Consuelo Crespi
1968, 1969, 1970, 1992	Best Dressed Men, Best Dressed Men Fashion Professionals, Hall of Fame- Men, Enduring Images of Elegance	Hubert de Givenchy
1969	Best Dressed Women in Private Life	Ali MacGraw
1969, 1970	Best Dressed Women in Private Life, Hall of Fame- Women	Dolores Guinness
1969, 1970, 1971, 1972, 1973	Best Dressed Women in Private Life, Best Dressed Women, Hall of Fame- Women	Salimah Aga Khan
1969	Best Dressed Women in Private Life	Pamela Zauderer, wife of the brother of Lynn Wyatt
1969	Best Dressed Women in Fashion World	Berry Berenson
1969, 1970	Best Dressed Women in Fashion World	Pamela Collin, wife of David Ormsby-Gore, 5th Baron Harlech
1969	Best Dressed Women in Fashion World	the wife of Minouche le Blan, a partner of Valentino
1969, 1970, 1971, 1972	Best Dressed Women in Fashion World, Best Dressed Women Fashion Professionals, Best Dressed Women Fashion Personalities	Madame Eve Orton, editor at Harper's Bazaar
1969, 1970, 1992	Best Dressed Men, Hall of Fame- Men, Enduring Images of Elegance	Gianni Agnelli
1969	Best Dressed Men	Adolphus Andrews
1969, 1971, 1972	Best Dressed Men, Hall of Fame- Men	Harry Belafonte
1969, 1971, 1972, 1975	Best Dressed Men, Hall of Fame- Men	Gianni Bulgari
1969	Best Dressed Men	Michael Butler
1969	Best Dressed Men	James Coburn
1969, 1971, 1974, 1975, 1976	Best Dressed Men, Hall of Fame- Men	Frank Gifford
1969, 1970	Best Dressed Men, Hall of Fame- Men	Eric de Rothschild
1969, 1972	Best Dressed Men	David Susskind
1969	Best Dressed Men Fashion Professionals	Luis Estevez
1969, 1971, 1972	Best Dressed Men Fashion Professionals, Hall of Fame- Men	Robert L. Green
1969, 1970, 1971	Best Dressed Men Fashion Professionals	Nicolas de Gunzburg
1969	Best Dressed Men Fashion Professionals	Walter Halle, heir of the Halle Brothers Co.
1969	Best Dressed Men Fashion Professionals	Sighsten Herrgård
1969, 1970, 1971, 1974, 1975	Best Dressed Men Fashion Professionals, Hall of Fame- Men	Robert Sakowitz
1969, 1970, 1971, 1972, 1973	Best Dressed Men Fashion Professionals, Best Dressed Men Fashion Personalities, Hall of Fame- Men	Philippe Venet
1970	Best Dressed Women	Catherine Deneuve
1970, 1998	Best Dressed Women, Hall of Fame- Women	Sophia Loren
1970, 1994	Best Dressed Women, Hall of Fame- Women	Claude Pompidou
1970, 1974, 1975, 1977, 1978, 1981	Best Dressed Women Fashion Professionals, Best Dressed Women, Hall of Fame- Women	Pilar Crespi, daughter of Consuelo Crespi
1970	Best Dressed Women Fashion Professionals	Anne Klein
1970, 1987, 1989	Best Dressed Women Fashion Professionals, Best Dressed Women- International Fashion Industries, Hall of Fame- Women	China Machado
1970	Best Dressed Women Fashion Professionals	Sonia Rykiel
1970, 1971, 1973, 1974	Best Dressed Women Fashion Professionals, Best Dressed Women	Pam Zauderer, wife of Robert Sakowitz
1970, 1971, 1972, 1975, 1976	Best Dressed Women Fashion Professionals, Best Dressed Women Fashion Personalities	Naomi Sims
1970	Best Dressed Men	John Frederick Byers III, chairman of the Yale University Art Gallery
1970	Best Dressed Men	Yul Brynner
1970, 1973	Best Dressed Men, Hall of Fame- Men	Hernando Courtright
1970, 1972, 1973	Best Dressed Men, Hall of Fame- Men	John Galliher, photographer for W magazine
1970, 1972	Best Dressed Men	Armando Orsini, husband of Lili St. Cyr
1970	Best Dressed Men	Giorgio Pavone, socialite friend of Rudy, Consuelo Crespi
1970	Best Dressed Men	Thomas Shevlin, an upper class socialite who hung around Palm Beach, Florida
1970, 1992	Best Dressed Men, Enduring Images of Elegance	Bobby Short
1970, 1971	Best Dressed Men	Antony Armstrong-Jones, 1st Earl of Snowdon
1970	Best Dressed Men	Sargent Shriver
1970, 1971, 1972, 1974	Best Dressed Men Fashion Professionals, Best Dressed Men Fashion Personalities, Hall of Fame- Men	Hardy Amies
1970, 1973	Best Dressed Men Fashion Professionals, Hall of Fame- Men	Nino Cerruti
1970, 1971, 1972, 1973, 1974	Best Dressed Men Fashion Professionals, Best Dressed Men Fashion Personalities, Best Dressed Men, Hall of Fame- Men	Kenneth Jay Lane
1970, 1971, 1972, 1973	Best Dressed Men Fashion Professionals, Best Dressed Men Fashion Personalities, Hall of Fame- Men	Oscar de la Renta
1970, 1971, 1972, 1973, 1974, 1975	Best Dressed Men Fashion Professionals, Best Dressed Men Fashion Personalities, Best Dressed Men	Tommy Nutter
1970, 1971, 1972, 1973	Best Dressed Men Fashion Professionals, Best Dressed Men Fashion Personalities, Hall of Fame- Men	Andre Oliver
1970	Best Dressed Men Fashion Professionals	Francis Alexander Shields
1970, 1971, 1973, 1974	Best Dressed Men Fashion Professionals, Best Dressed Men, Hall of Fame- Men	Chip Tolbert, fashion director at Esquire
1970, 1971, 1973, 1975, 1977, 1978	Best Dressed Men Fashion Professionals, Best Dressed Men, Hall of Fame- Men	Daniel Zarem, vice-president at Bonwit Teller
1971, 1973, 1980	Best Dressed Women, Outstanding Examples of Elegance Without Ostentation- Women, Citations	Frances Lasker Brody
1971	Best Dressed Women	Liza Minnelli
1971, 1975	Best Dressed Women, Hall of Fame- Women	São Schlumberger
1971, 1972, 1973, 1975, 1976, 1977, 1978, 1980, 1981, 1992, 1996, 1997	Best Dressed Women, Outstanding Examples of Elegance Without Ostentation- Women, Hall of Fame- Women, Best Dressed Women Fashion Professionals, Enduring Images of Elegance	Carolina Herrera
1971	Best Dressed Women	Cher
1971	Best Dressed Women	Twiggy
1971, 1975	Best Dressed Women	Kitty Hawks
1971, 1974	Best Dressed Women	Lally Weymouth
1971, 1972	Best Dressed Women Fashion Professionals, Best Dressed Women Fashion Personalities	Gillis MacGill
1971, 1972, 1973, 1974, 1977	Best Dressed Women Fashion Professionals, Best Dressed Women Fashion Personalities, Best Dressed Women	Diane von Fürstenberg
1971, 1972	Best Dressed Women Fashion Professionals, Hall of Fame- Women	Madame Grès
1971, 1972, 1974, 1975, 1976, 1977, 1997	Best Dressed Women Fashion Professionals, Best Dressed Women Fashion Personalities, Hall of Fame- Women	Mary McFadden
1971, 1972, 1973	Best Dressed Women Fashion Professionals, Best Dressed Women Fashion Personalities, Best Dressed Women- Hall of Fame	Elsa Peretti
1971, 1972, 1975, 1976	Best Dressed Men, Hall of Fame- Men	John Lindsay
1971, 1972, 1974, 1976	Best Dressed Men, Hall of Fame- Men	Billy Baldwin
1971, 1972	Best Dressed Men, Hall of Fame- Men	Sidney Poitier
1971, 1972	Best Dressed Men	Mick Jagger
1971, 1972	Best Dressed Men	Robert Redford
1971	Best Dressed Men	Cristóbal Martínez-Bordiú, 10th Marquis of Villaverde
1971, 1974	Best Dressed Men	Thomas Schippers
1972, 1973, 1977, 1978	Best Dressed Women, Outstanding Examples of Elegance Without Ostentation- Women, Hall of Fame- Women	Gabrielle van Zuylen
1972	Best Dressed Women	Annette de la Renta
1972	Best Dressed Women	the wife of Gianluigi Gabetti, director general for the Agnelli family
1972, 1976	Best Dressed Women, Hall of Fame- Women	Bianca Jagger
1972, 1974, 1975	Best Dressed Women, Hall of Fame- Women	Patricia Buckley
1972	Best Dressed Women	Martha Firestone Ford
1972, 1973, 1978, 1980, 1981, 1982	Best Dressed Women Fashion Personalities, Best Dressed Women, Best Dressed Women Fashion Professionals, Hall of Fame- Women	Jean Muir
1972, 1973, 1975, 1977, 1981, 1992	Best Dressed Women Fashion Personalities, Best Dressed Women, Best Dressed Women Fashion Professionals, Hall of Fame- Women, Enduring Images of Elegance	Loulou de la Falaise
1972, 1973, 1974, 1975	Best Dressed Women Fashion Personalities, Best Dressed Women, Best Dressed Women Fashion Professionals, Hall of Fame- Women	Grace Mirabella
1972, 1977, 1978	Best Dressed Men	David J. Mahoney
1972, 1975	Best Dressed Men, Hall of Fame- Men	Robert Evans
1972, 1976, 1986, 1987	Best Dressed Men, Hall of Fame- Men	Fred Hughes
1972	Best Dressed Men	Richard Roundtree
1972	Best Dressed Men Fashion Personalities	Halston
1972, 1973, 1974, 1975, 1976, 1977, 1981, 1982	Best Dressed Men Fashion Personalities, Best Dressed Men, Best Dressed Men Fashion Professionals, Hall of Fame- Men	James Galanos
1972, 1973, 1974, 1975	Best Dressed Men Fashion Personalities, Best Dressed Men, Best Dressed Men Fashion Professionals, Hall of Fame- Men	Yves Saint Laurent
1972, 1974, 1975, 1976, 1977	Best Dressed Men Fashion Personalities, Best Dressed Men Fashion Professionals, Best Dressed Men, Hall of Fame- Men	Joel Schumacher
1972, 1973, 1974	Best Dressed Men Fashion Personalities, Best Dressed Men, Hall of Fame- Men	Max Evans, fashion editor at Esquire
1972	Best Dressed Men Fashion Personalities	Henry Sell, editor-at-large for Harper's Bazaar
1973, 1974	Best Dressed Women	Catherine Murray di Montezemolo
1973, 1974, 1975, 1977	Best Dressed Women, Best Dressed Women Fashion Professionals	Carrie Donovan
1973, 1986, 1987, 1988	Best Dressed Women, Hall of Fame- Women	Anjelica Huston
1973, 1974	Best Dressed Women, Best Dressed Women Fashion Professionals	Audrey Smaltz, fashion editor of Jet
1973, 1975	Outstanding Examples of Elegance Without Ostentation- Women, Hall of Fame- Women	Cristiana Brandolini d'Adda
1973, 1974, 1975	Outstanding Examples of Elegance Without Ostentation- Women, Best Dressed Women	the wife of international banker Bernard Camu
1973	Outstanding Examples of Elegance Without Ostentation- Women	Carmen Martínez-Bordiú
1973, 1974, 1975, 1978	Outstanding Examples of Elegance Without Ostentation- Women, Best Dressed Women, Hall of Fame- Women	Betty Catroux
1973, 1974	Outstanding Examples of Elegance Without Ostentation- Women, Best Dressed Women	Isabelle Goldsmith, wife of Arnaud de Rosnay
1973, 1974, 1977	Outstanding Examples of Elegance Without Ostentation- Women, Best Dressed Women, Hall of Fame- Women	Mary Wells Lawrence
1973, 1975, 1976, 1977	Outstanding Examples of Elegance Without Ostentation- Women, Best Dressed Women, Hall of Fame- Women	Lynn Wyatt
1973, 2006	Best Dressed Men	Giancarlo Giammetti
1973, 1975, 1976, 1991, 1995	Best Dressed Men, Best Dressed Men Fashion Professionals, Special Citations, Hall of Fame- Men	Ralph Lauren
1973	Best Dressed Men	Piero Nuti
1973, 1975	Best Dressed Men	Carlo Palazzi
1973, 1974	Best Dressed Men, Best Dressed Men Fashion Professionals	Nono Maldonado
1973, 1976, 1980	Outstanding Examples of Elegance Without Ostentation- Men, Best Dressed Men, Hall of Fame- Men	Count Brando Brandolini, husband of Cristiana Brandolini d'Adda
1973, 1978, 1983	Outstanding Examples of Elegance Without Ostentation- Men, Best Dressed Men, Hall of Fame- Men	Señor Reinaldo Herrera Junior, husband of Carolina Herrera
1973	Outstanding Examples of Elegance Without Ostentation- Men	David K. E. Bruce
1973	Outstanding Examples of Elegance Without Ostentation- Men	Luiz Gastal, a Brazilian banker who lived in New York City
1973, 1976	Outstanding Examples of Elegance Without Ostentation- Men, Hall of Fame- Men	Barry Goldwater
1973, 1975	Outstanding Examples of Elegance Without Ostentation- Men, Hall of Fame- Men	Horace Kelland, heir of Clarence Budington Kelland
1973	Outstanding Examples of Elegance Without Ostentation- Men	Peter Revson
1973, 1983, 1991	Outstanding Examples of Elegance Without Ostentation- Men, Hall of Fame- Men	David René de Rothschild
1973, 1976, 1981	Outstanding Examples of Elegance Without Ostentation- Men, Best Dressed Men	Valerian Rybar
1973, 1974, 1977	Outstanding Examples of Elegance Without Ostentation- Men, Best Dressed Men, Hall of Fame- Men	Yves Vidal, president of Knoll Furniture
1973	Outstanding Examples of Elegance Without Ostentation- Men	Billy Dee Williams
1973, 1975, 1977	Outstanding Examples of Elegance Without Ostentation- Men, Best Dressed Men, Hall of Fame- Men	Michael York
1974, 1993, 1994	Best Dressed Women, Hall of Fame- Women	Caroline, Princess of Hanover
1974	Best Dressed Women	Betty Ford
1974	Best Dressed Women	Katharine Graham
1974, 1982	Best Dressed Women, Hall of Fame- Women	Nancy Kissinger
1974	Best Dressed Women Fashion Professionals	Lorna Hyde, public relations agent for Dior
1974	Best Dressed Women Fashion Professionals	Shirley Lorraine Rosenthal, wife of an owner of Neusteter's Department Store
1974, 1975, 1977, 1981	Best Dressed Women Fashion Professionals, Hall of Fame- Women	Louise Rouet, wife of a general manager at Dior
1974	Best Dressed Women Fashion Professionals	Mary Jane Russell
1974, 1976, 1978, 1980	Best Dressed Women Fashion Professionals	Marina Schiano
1974, 1975	Best Dressed Men	Valéry Giscard d'Estaing
1974, 1978, 1980	Best Dressed Men, Hall of Fame- Men, Citations	Charles, Prince of Wales
1974	Best Dressed Men	Guy Burgos, Chilean playboy in New York City, onetime son-in-law of John Spencer-Churchill, 10th Duke of Marlborough
1974, 1976, 1977	Best Dressed Men, Hall of Fame- Men	Angelo Donghia
1974	Best Dressed Men	J.J. Boss
1974	Best Dressed Men	Johnny Miller
1974	Best Dressed Men	Telly Savalas
1974	Best Dressed Men	John V. Tunney
1974	Best Dressed Men	Fred Williamson
1974, 1975, 1976, 1977, 1978, 1980, 1981, 1991	Best Dressed Men Fashion Professionals, Hall of Fame- Men, Special Citations	Giorgio Armani
1974	Best Dressed Men Fashion Professionals	Robert Bryan, author of "American Fashion Menswear"
1974	Best Dressed Men Fashion Professionals	Aldo Cipullo
1974	Best Dressed Men Fashion Professionals	Uva Harden, husband of Barbara Carrera
1974	Best Dressed Men Fashion Professionals	Nando Miglio, art director for Gucci and Hugo Boss
1974, 1975, 1976, 1977, 1978, 1982	Best Dressed Men Fashion Professionals, Hall of Fame- Men	Ottavio Missoni
1975, 1976, 1977, 1978	Best Dressed Women	Mary Van Nuys, wife of Irving Paul Lazar
1975, 1976, 1977	Best Dressed Women, Hall of Fame- Women	Françoise de Bourbon-Lobkowicz
1975, 1976, 1977, 1978	Best Dressed Women, Hall of Fame- Women	Jackie Ansley, an heiress of the Ansbacher banking dynasty
1975	Best Dressed Women	the wife of Paul Peralta-Ramos, son of Millicent Rogers
1975	Best Dressed Women	Loraine Diane Guyer, wife of Charles H. Percy
1975, 1977	Best Dressed Women Fashion Professionals	Donna Karan
1975	Best Dressed Men	Henry Thynne, 6th Marquess of Bath
1975, 1980, 1982, 1983, 1984	Best Dressed Men, Hall of Fame- Men	Alistair Cooke
1975, 1986	Best Dressed Men, Hall of Fame- Men	Ahmet Ertegun
1975	Best Dressed Men	Mohammad Reza Pahlavi
1975, 1976	Best Dressed Men	Marcello Mastroianni
1975, 1977, 1978	Best Dressed Men, Hall of Fame- Men	O. J. Simpson
1975	Best Dressed Men	Dick Van Dyke
1975, 1976, 1977, 1981, 1982, 1983	Best Dressed Men Fashion Professionals, Hall of Fame- Men	Calvin Klein
1975, 1976, 1977	Best Dressed Men Fashion Professionals	Jerry Magnin, heir of Cyril Magnin
1976	Best Dressed Women	Louise Nevelson
1976, 1980	Best Dressed Women	Olimpia Anna Aldobrandini, wife of David René de Rothschild
1976	Best Dressed Women	Mary Tyler Moore
1976, 1992, 1993	Best Dressed Women, Classicists, Hall of Fame- Women	Pamela Harriman
1976	Best Dressed Women	Olive Cawley, wife of Thomas J. Watson Jr.
1976	Best Dressed Women	Antonia Fraser
1976	Best Dressed Women Fashion Professionals	Minnie Lichtenstein Marcus
1976, 1977, 1978, 1980, 1981, 1983, 1984, 1990	Best Dressed Women Fashion Professionals, Hall of Fame- Women	Contessa Donina Cicogna
1976, 1977, 1978	Best Dressed Men, Hall of Fame- Men	Jeffrey Butler, publisher of an inflight magazine
1976	Best Dressed Men	Walt Frazier
1976, 1977	Best Dressed Men	John Arthur Love
1976	Best Dressed Men	Marques Anthony Portago, heir of Alfonso de Portago
1976, 1982	Best Dressed Men	Robert Rossellini Junior, son of Ingrid Bergman
1976, 1985	Best Dressed Men, Hall of Fame- Men	Robin Russell, 14th Duke of Bedford
1976, 1977, 1978, 1980, 1981, 1983, 1984	Best Dressed Men Fashion Professionals	Alexander Julian
1977	Best Dressed Women	Diane Keaton
1977, 1978, 1980	Best Dressed Women, Hall of Fame- Women	Olive Behrendt, matron of the Los Angeles Music Center
1977, 1980, 1983, 1993	Best Dressed Women, Best Dressed Women Fashion Professionals, Hall of Fame- Women	Isabelle d'Ornano, wife of the owner of Sisley Cosmetics
1977, 1978, 1980, 1984	Best Dressed Women	Ann Getty
1977, 1978, 1981	Best Dressed Women, Hall of Fame- Women	Carmen Solbiati
1977, 1978	Best Dressed Women	Lacey Neuhaus, who played the role of Emily Austin in From Here to Eternity
1977, 1978, 1980	Best Dressed Women, Hall of Fame- Women	Jean Tailer, who had five advantageous marriages, including to Alexis Thompson
1977, 1978	Best Dressed Women Fashion Professionals	Grace Coddington
1977, 1978	Best Dressed Women Fashion Professionals	Muriel Grateau, designer of handbags, jewelry, tableware
1977, 1978, 1980, 1981, 1982, 1983, 1986	Best Dressed Women Fashion Professionals	Norma Kamali
1977, 1985, 1987, 1989	Best Dressed Women Fashion Professionals, Best Dressed Women- International Fashion Industries, Hall of Fame- Women	Elsa Klensch
1977	Best Dressed Men	Mikhail Baryshnikov
1977, 1978, 1980	Best Dressed Men, Hall of Fame- Men	Earl Blackwell, founder of the American Theater Hall of Fame
1977, 1978	Best Dressed Men, Hall of Fame- Men	Kim d'Estainville, a lover of Tina Chow
1977	Best Dressed Men	Arthur Levitt
1977	Best Dressed Men	Gerry Mulligan
1977, 1978	Best Dressed Men	Anwar Sadat
1977	Best Dressed Men	Tom Tryon
1977	Best Dressed Men	Andrew Young
1977, 1978	Best Dressed Men Fashion Professionals	Ted Dawson, style consultant for Hart Schaffner Marx
1977, 1978, 1980, 1981	Best Dressed Men Fashion Professionals, Hall of Fame- Men	Tom Fallon, brand executive for the Bill Blass Group
1977, 1978, 1980	Best Dressed Men Fashion Professionals	Rupert Lycett Green
1978	Best Dressed Women	the wife of Timothée Ahoua N'Guetta
1978, 1990	Best Dressed Women	Candice Bergen
1978, 1984, 1998	Best Dressed Women, Hall of Fame- Women	Queen Noor of Jordan
1978	Best Dressed Women	Miranda Guinness, Countess of Iveagh
1978, 1980, 1981, 1982, 1983, 1985, 1992	Best Dressed Women, Citations, Hall of Fame- Women, Enduring Images of Elegance	Paloma Picasso
1978, 1980, 1982	Best Dressed Women	Diana Ross
1978	Best Dressed Women Fashion Professionals	Pat Cleveland
1978, 1981	Best Dressed Women Fashion Professionals	Barbara Allen de Kwiatkowski
1978, 1982, 2006, 2007	Best Dressed Women Fashion Professionals, Best Dressed	Anna Piaggi
1978	Best Dressed Men	Hugh Carey
1978	Best Dressed Men	Vitas Gerulaitis
1978, 1982	Best Dressed Men, Hall of Fame- Men	John Gielgud
1978	Best Dressed Men	Thadee Klossowski, husband of Loulou de la Falaise
1978, 1981	Best Dressed Men	Dan Rather
1978	Best Dressed Men	Jay Spectre, the first furniture designer to be represented in the permanent collection of the New York State Museum
1978, 1980, 1981, 1982, 1983	Best Dressed Men Fashion Professionals, Hall of Fame- Men	Wilkes Bashford
1978	Best Dressed Men Fashion Professionals	Charles Hix, author of masculine style books, writer for GQ
1978	Best Dressed Men Fashion Professionals	Prince Egon von Fürstenberg
1978	Best Dressed Men Fashion Professionals	Lee Wright, Cutty Sark Men's Fashion Award-winning menswear designer
1980	Best Dressed Women	Katharine, Duchess of Kent
1980	Best Dressed Women	Chantal Maria De Nora De Bavier, heiress of Charles-Edouard de Bavier
1980, 1981, 1982, 1984, 1985, 1986, 1987	Best Dressed Women, Hall of Fame- Women	Mercedes Bass
1980, 1981	Best Dressed Women	Constance Barber Mellon, heiress of Richard King Mellon
1980, 1982, 1984, 1986, 1987, 1988, 1989, 1990	Best Dressed Women, Hall of Fame- Women	Irith Federmann, mother of Alexia Landeau
1980	Best Dressed Women	Carmen de Lavallade
1980, 1981	Best Dressed Women, Hall of Fame- Women	Eleanor Christenson, wife of Leslie Salt and of a Stauffer Chemical heir
1980, 1981	Best Dressed Women	Estée Lauder
1980, 1995	Best Dressed Women, Hall of Fame- Women	Grace Maria Kolin, wife of William Ward, 3rd Earl of Dudley
1980	Best Dressed Women Fashion Professionals	Princess Anne Carraciolo
1980	Best Dressed Women Fashion Professionals	Francine Crescent, editor of Vogue Paris
1980, 1981	Best Dressed Men, Hall of Fame- Men	Charles H. Percy
1980	Best Dressed Men	Roger Penske
1980, 1981	Best Dressed Men	Alexander Haig
1980, 1981, 1984	Best Dressed Men, Hall of Fame- Men	Carlos Ortiz de Rozas
1980, 1985, 1988	Best Dressed Men, Hall of Fame- Men	Thomas Ammann
1980, 1985, 1987	Best Dressed Men, Hall of Fame- Men	James F. Hoge Jr.
1980, 1981	Best Dressed Men, Hall of Fame- Men	Henry Plumer McIlhenny
1980	Best Dressed Men	José López Portillo
1980, 1982, 1985, 1986, 1992	Best Dressed Men, Citations, Hall of Fame- Men, Enduring Images of Elegance	David Hockney
1980	Best Dressed Men	Earl Edward Tailer Smith Junior, heir of Earl E. T. Smith
1980, 1985	Best Dressed Men, Hall of Fame- Men	Jerry Zipkin
1980	Best Dressed Men Fashion Professionals	Jean-Baptiste Caumont, design assistant at Balmain; illustrator for Vogue and Marie Claire; design consultant for La Rinascente and Dior; and owner of his own Boutiques in Milan, New York, Tokyo
1980	Best Dressed Men Fashion Professionals	Angelo Zegna
1980, 1981	Best Dressed Men Fashion Professionals, Hall of Fame- Men	Alexander Liberman
1980, 1981, 1984, 1985, 1986, 1987, 1992	Best Dressed Men Fashion Professionals, Hall of Fame- Men, Enduring Images of Elegance	Manolo Blahnik
1980	Citations	Harriet Berk Simon, wife of Armand Deutsch
1980	Citations	Marion Jorgensen
1980, 1984, 1988	Citations, Best Dressed Women, Hall of Fame- Women	Frances Brice, wife of Ray Stark
1980	Citations	Leonore Annenberg
1980	Citations	Missus William Wilson
1980, 1983, 1985, 1987	Citations, Best Dressed Women, Hall of Fame- Women	Carol Swanson, wife of Charles H. Price II
1981	Best Dressed Women	the wife of Nuha Al Hegelloun, Saudi ambassador
1981	Best Dressed Women	Jacqueline Bisset
1981, 1982, 1984	Best Dressed Women	Patricia Phelps de Cisneros
1981, 1982, 1983, 1984, 1985, 1988, 1989, 1991, 1992	Best Dressed Women, Citation, Perennial Role Models of Fashion, Hall of Fame- Women, Special Citations, Enduring Images of Elegance	Diana, Princess of Wales
1981, 1982, 1983	Best Dressed Women, Citations, Hall of Fame- Women	Lena Horne
1981, 1983, 1985, 1986, 1988, 1989, 1992, 1993, 1994	Best Dressed Women, Best Dressed Women Fashion Professionals, Classicists	Cece Cord, lifestyle brand model for Kieselstein-Cord
1981	Best Dressed Women	Frau Renate Linsenmayer, wife of the manager of the Breidenbacher Hof
1981	Best Dressed Women	Mathilde Alexe Marie Christiane Coche de la Ferté, wife of Édouard de Rothschild
1981, 1982, 1983	Best Dressed Women Fashion Professionals, Hall of Fame- Women	Georgina Brandolini d'Adda
1981	Best Dressed Women Fashion Professionals	Mirella Pettini, a model who was photographed by Francesco Scavullo for Cartier, and by Irving Penn and William Klein for Vogue
1981	Best Dressed Men	Ian Russell, 13th Duke of Bedford
1981	Best Dressed Men	John DeLorean
1981	Best Dressed Men	Vernon Jordan
1981, 1984	Best Dressed Men	Sugar Ray Leonard
1981, 1986	Best Dressed Men	Jean-Pierre Marcie-Riviere, who donated "the largest collection of an artist ever assembled by a collector" to the Musée d'Orsay
1981, 1982	Best Dressed Men, Hall of Fame- Men	David Niven
1981, 1984, 1985, 1986	Best Dressed Men, Perennial Role Models of Fashion, Citations, Hall of Fame- Men	Ronald Reagan
1981, 1984	Best Dressed Men, Hall of Fame- Men	Tom Wolfe
1981	Best Dressed Men Fashion Professionals	Robert Beauchamp
1981, 1982, 1985, 1986, 1988, 1989	Best Dressed Men Fashion Professionals, Hall of Fame- Men	Bijan Pakzad
1981, 1983, 1985, 1987, 1988	Best Dressed Men Fashion Professionals, Hall of Fame- Men	John Fairchild
1981, 1983, 1984, 1985, 1986, 1988, 1989, 1991, 1994, 1995	Best Dressed Men Fashion Professionals, Hall of Fame- Men	Philip Boyd Miller, chief executive officer of Saks Fifth Avenue
1981, 1982, 1986, 1988, 1992, 1994	Best Dressed Men Fashion Professionals, Best Dressed Men, Hall of Fame- Men	André Leon Talley
1981	Best Dressed Men Fashion Professionals	Zoran Ladicorbic
1981	Best Dressed Men Fashion Professionals	Andy Warhol
1982	Best Dressed Women	Elizabeth Dole
1982, 1983, 1984	Best Dressed Women, Hall of Fame- Women	Naty Abascal
1982, 1986	Best Dressed Women, Hall of Fame- Women	Dorothy Hammerstein
1982, 1985, 1986, 1987, 1988	Best Dressed Women, Hall of Fame- Women	Sybil B. Harrington
1982	Best Dressed Women	Barbara Sinatra
1982	Best Dressed Women	Raquel Welch
1982, 1983, 1984, 1985	Best Dressed Women, Hall of Fame- Women	Josephine McCarthy Strother, wife of the son of Richard Thornton Wilson III, who was the son of Marshall Orme Wilson
1982	Best Dressed Women Fashion Professionals	Marina Bulgari, cousin of Gianni Bulgari
1982	Best Dressed Women Fashion Professionals	Joanna Holland, wife of Johnny Carson
1982, 1983, 1984, 1985, 1991, 1997	Best Dressed Women Fashion Professionals, Best Dressed Women, Hall of Fame- Women, Special Citations	Tina Chow
1982	Best Dressed Women Fashion Professionals	Catherine de Limur, director of haute couture for Emanuel Ungaro
1982, 1991	Best Dressed Women Fashion Professionals	Lauren Hutton
1982, 1983, 1984, 1986	Best Dressed Women Fashion Professionals, Hall of Fame- Women	Iman
1982, 1985, 1988	Best Dressed Women Fashion Professionals	Mariuccia Mandelli
1982	Best Dressed Women Fashion Professionals	Daniele Moreira
1982, 1985, 1991, 1993, 1994	Best Dressed Women Fashion Professionals	Adrienne Vittadini
1982	Best Dressed Men	Andrew Mountbatten
1982, 2007, 2009	Best Dressed Men	Peter Beard
1982, 1984	Best Dressed Men	Leo Castelli
1982, 1983, 1984, 1985, 1986, 1987, 1988, 1989, 1990, 1992	Best Dressed Men, Hall of Fame- Men, Enduring Images of Elegance	Christopher Forbes
1982	Best Dressed Men	Prentis Cobb Hale
1982	Best Dressed Men	Julio Iglesias
1982, 1983, 1984	Best Dressed Men	Jeremy Irons
1982	Best Dressed Men	François Mitterrand
1982	Best Dressed Men	Joseph Verner Reed Jr.
1982, 1984, 1986	Best Dressed Men	Rafael Lopez Sanchez, husband of Paloma Picasso
1982, 1991	Best Dressed Men Fashion Professionals	Jeffrey Banks
1982, 1983, 1984, 1987, 1991	Best Dressed Men Fashion Professionals	Clifford Grodd
1982, 1993	Best Dressed Men Fashion Professionals	Didier Grumbach, president of the Fédération française de la couture
1982, 1983, 1984, 2008	Best Dressed Men Fashion Professionals, Best Dressed	Karl Lagerfeld
1982, 1983, 1984, 1985, 1987	Best Dressed Men Fashion Professionals, Hall of Fame- Men	Issey Miyake
1983	Symbols of the Young Conservative Swing	Prince Jean of Luxembourg
1983, 1987	Symbols of the Young Conservative Swing, Best Dressed Men	Sebastian de Ganay
1983, 1994	Symbols of the Young Conservative Swing, Best Dressed Women	Antonia Frering, who portrayed Sister Stephanie in Mother Teresa of Calcutta, and Reema in I Can't Think Straight
1983	Symbols of the Young Conservative Swing	Penelope Knatchbull, Countess Mountbatten of Burma
1983	Best Dressed Women	Allegra Caracciolo di Castagneto, wife of Umberto Agnelli
1983, 1985, 1986, 1990, 1993, 1994	Best Dressed Women, Hall of Fame- Women	Anne Hendricks Bass
1983	Best Dressed Women	Linda Evans
1983, 1985	Best Dressed Women, Hall of Fame- Women	Firyal Irshaid
1983, 1984	Best Dressed Women, Hall of Fame- Women	Beatriz Canedo Patiño
1983, 1988	Best Dressed Women, Hall of Fame- Women	Casey Ribicoff
1983, 1987	Best Dressed Women	Diane Sawyer
1983, 1986, 1987	Best Dressed Women, Hall of Fame- Women	Hilary Weston
1983, 1984	Best Dressed Women Fashion Professionals	Arlette Brisson, second wife of the man formerly married to Rosalind Russell
1983, 1984, 1985, 1988	Best Dressed Women Fashion Professionals	Claude Brouet, a designer for Hermès
1983, 1987	Best Dressed Women Fashion Professionals, Hall of Fame- Women	Joan Juliet Buck
1983, 1985, 1986, 1991	Best Dressed Women Fashion Professionals	Jun Kanai, head of Issey Miyake United States
1983, 1984, 1987, 1991, 1997, 1998	Best Dressed Women Fashion Professionals, Best Dressed Women- International Fashion Industries, Special Citation, Best Dressed Fashion Professionals- Women	Dawn Mello
1983, 1989	Best Dressed Women Fashion Professionals	Frances Patiky Stein, mentor of Vera Wang
1983	Best Dressed Women Fashion Professionals	Dawn Mello
1983, 1984	Best Dressed Men, Hall of Fame- Men	Arthur Ashe
1983, 1985, 1986, 1987, 1988, 1992	Best Dressed Men, Hall of Fame- Men, Enduring Images of Elegance	Mark Birley
1983	Best Dressed Men	John Forsythe
1983, 1985, 1988, 1989, 1990, 1991	Best Dressed Men, Hall of Fame- Men	Mark Hampton
1983, 1984, 1987, 1989	Best Dressed Men, Hall of Fame- Men	Peter Jennings
1983	Best Dressed Men	Zubin Mehta
1983, 1985	Best Dressed Men, Hall of Fame- Men	Abraham Ribicoff
1983, 1988	Best Dressed Men Fashion Professionals	Alan Flusser
1983, 1984	Best Dressed Men Fashion Professionals	Leo Lerman
1983	Best Dressed Men Fashion Professionals	Marc de Coster, hairdresser to Betsy Bloomingdale, Wallis Simpson, Babe Paley, and Pamela Harriman
1968	Best Dressed Women	Hope Portocarrero, First lady of Nicaragua
1983, 1986	Best Dressed Men Fashion Professionals	Valentino
1983	Best Dressed Men Fashion Professionals	Gustav Zumsteg
1984	Impacting Personalities Influencing Adolescent Dress	Michael Jackson
1984	Impacting Personalities Influencing Adolescent Dress	Grace Jones
1984	Impacting Personalities Influencing Adolescent Dress	Madonna
1984	Impacting Personalities Influencing Adolescent Dress	Prince Rogers Nelson
1984, 1996	Impacting Personalities Influencing Adolescent Dress, Hall of Fame- Women	Tina Turner
1984, 1989, 1990, 1991	Best Dressed Women, Best Dressed Women Fashion Professionals, Hall of Fame- Women	Shakira Caine
1984, 1988, 1989, 1990	Best Dressed Women, Citations, Hall of Fame- Women	Empress Michiko
1984, 1986, 1987	Best Dressed Women	Anna Murdoch Mann
1984	Best Dressed Women	Paula Traboulsi, mother of Yasmina Traboulsi
1984, 1986	Best Dressed Women Fashion Professionals	Laura Biagiotti
1984, 1985, 1986, 1988, 1989	Best Dressed Women Fashion Professionals	Donatella Girombelli, co-founder of Genny
1984	Best Dressed Women Fashion Professionals	Jerry Hall
1984, 1985, 1986, 1989, 1990, 1993, 1997	Best Dressed Women Fashion Professionals, Hall of Fame- Women	Anna Wintour
1984	Best Dressed Women Fashion Professionals	Jackie Rogers, Federico Fellini and Coco Chanel model who started her own boutique in New York City
1984, 1985, 1991	Best Dressed Women Fashion Professionals	Nonnie Moore
1984, 1985, 1987, 1988	Best Dressed Men, Hall of Fame- Men	David Somerset, 11th Duke of Beaufort
1984, 1985, 1989	Best Dressed Men, Hall of Fame- Men	Chuck Pfeifer, Upper East Side heir who fought in the United States Army Special Forces, played American football at the United States Military Academy, modeled for Winston cigarettes, took drugs at Studio 54
1984, 1987, 1989, 1990	Best Dressed Men, Hall of Fame- Men	Julio Mario Santo Domingo
1984, 1987, 2008	Best Dressed Men	Julian Schnabel
1984, 1994	Best Dressed Men	Tom Selleck
1984	Best Dressed Men Fashion Professionals	Mark Boxer
1984, 1985	Best Dressed Men Fashion Professionals	Roger Baugh, a winner of the Cutty Sark Men's Fashion Awards
1984	Best Dressed Men Fashion Professionals	Victor Skrebneski
1984	Best Dressed Men Fashion Professionals	Michel Bergerac
1985, 1995, 1996	Best Dressed Women	Pauline Baker, wife of financier Dixon Boardman and of real estate mogul Bill Pitt
1985	Best Dressed Women	Helena Bonham Carter
1985	Best Dressed Women	Maria Pia Tavazzani Fanfani
1985, 1986	Best Dressed Women	Kathleen Bickley, wife of the heir of John Randolph Hearst
1985	Best Dressed Women	Whitney Houston
1985, 1987	Best Dressed Women, Hall of Fame- Women	Beatrice Dávila Rocha, wife of Julio Mario Santo Domingo
1985	Best Dressed Women	Maria Shriver
1985, 1986, 1990	Best Dressed Women	Baroness Sylvia de Waldner, a client of Hubert de Givenchy
1985	Best Dressed Women Fashion Professionals	Anouk Aimée
1985, 1986	Best Dressed Women Fashion Professionals	Catherine de Castelbajac
1985, 1986, 1988	Best Dressed Women Fashion Professionals, Hall of Fame- Women	Kitty d'Alessio, president of Chanel
1985, 1997, 1998	Best Dressed Men, Hall of Fame- Men	David Bowie
1985	Best Dressed Men	Hassan II of Morocco
1985	Best Dressed Men	Kevin Kline
1985	Best Dressed Men Fashion Professionals	Jacques Dehornois, a stylist for Anna Wintour
1985, 1986, 1987, 1988	Best Dressed Men Fashion Professionals	Leonardo Ferragamo, heir of Salvatore Ferragamo
1985, 1986, 1987, 1988	Best Dressed Men Fashion Professionals, Hall of Fame- Men	Stevie Kaufmann
1986	Best Dressed Women	Diandra Luker, wife of Michael Douglas
1986, 1989	Best Dressed Women, Hall of Fame- Women	Trinidad Jiménez Lopera, wife of Ildefonso (Alfonso) González-Fierro y Viña, founder of the Fierro Group
1986, 1994, 1999	Best Dressed Women, Hall of Fame- Women	Charlotte Anne Greville, sister of Guy David Greville, 9th Earl of Warwick
1986	Best Dressed Women	Gayatri Devi
1986	Best Dressed Women	Barbara Walters
1986, 1987, 1988, 1989	Best Dressed Women Fashion Professionals, Best Dressed Women- International Fashion Industries, Hall of Fame- Women	Evangelina Blahnik, sister of Manolo Blahnik
1986, 1987, 1989, 1991, 1993	Best Dressed Women Fashion Professionals, Best Dressed Women- International Fashion Industries	Joy Hendricks, right-hand woman to Pierre Bergé at Yves Saint Laurent
1986, 1997	Best Dressed Men, Special Citation	Antony Acland
1986, 1994	Best Dressed Men, Hall of Fame- Men	Prince Dimitri of Yugoslavia
1986	Best Dressed Men	Prince Edward, Earl of Wessex
1986, 1992, 1993	Best Dressed Men, Hall of Fame- Men	Gregory Hines
1986	Best Dressed Men	James Jorge
1986, 1987, 1989, 1992	Best Dressed Men, Hall of Fame- Men, Enduring Images of Elegance	Juan Carlos I
1986, 1988	Best Dressed Men, Hall of Fame- Men	Peter Jay Sharp, namesake of some New York City theaters
1986	Best Dressed Men Fashion Professionals	Nicholas Coleridge
1986, 1987, 1989	Best Dressed Men Fashion Professionals	Count Brando Crespi, son of Consuelo Crespi
1986, 1988, 1989, 1990, 1991, 1993	Best Dressed Men Fashion Professionals, Best Dressed Men, Hall of Fame- Men	Paul Wilmot, husband of Mollie Wilmot
1986, 1987	Best Dressed Men Fashion Professionals	Ermenegildo Zegna
1987, 1990	Citations, Best Dressed Women, Hall of Fame- Women	Margaret Thatcher
1987	Best Dressed Women	Susan Penn, wife of John Gutfreund
1987, 1989	Best Dressed Women	Victoria Niarchos
1987, 1988, 1989	Best Dressed Women, Hall of Fame- Women	Marina Palma, a socialite who hangs out in Portofino, London
1987, 1993, 1994, 1995, 1996	Best Dressed Women, Best Dressed Women Fashion Professionals, Special Citation	Joan Rivers
1987	Best Dressed Women	Judith Mazor Rounick, wife of A. Alfred Taubman
1987, 1988, 1990	Best Dressed Women, Hall of Fame- Women	Alexandra Schoenburg-Hartenstein, wife of Taki Theodoracopulos
1987, 1988, 1993, 1995, 1996, 1997	Best Dressed Women- International Fashion Industries, Best Dressed Women Fashion Professionals, Special Citation	Anouska Hempel
1987	Best Dressed Women- International Fashion Industries	Claudine Marguerite Marianne Tritz, mother of Diana Álvares Pereira de Melo, 11th Duchess of Cadaval
1987, 1989, 1991, 1993, 1994, 1996, 1998	Best Dressed Women- International Fashion Industries, Best Dressed Women, Best Dressed Women Fashion Professionals, Special Citation, Hall of Fame- Women	Inès de La Fressange
1987, 1991, 1993	Best Dressed Women- International Fashion Industries	Kelly Rector, wife of Calvin Klein
1987, 1988, 1994, 1998, 2000, 2001	Best Dressed Women- International Fashion Industries, Best Dressed Women Fashion Professionals, Best Dressed Women, Hall of Fame- Women	Marian McEvoy, promoter of Margaux Hemingway
1987, 1992, 1993, 1995, 1996, 1997, 1998	Best Dressed Women- International Fashion Industries, Classicists, Best Dressed Women Fashion Professionals, Best Dressed Women, Hall of Fame- Women	Joyce Ma, founder of Joyce clothing shops
1987	Best Dressed Men	Corbin Bernsen
1987, 1988	Best Dressed Men	Richard Burt
1987, 1988, 1990	Best Dressed Men, Hall of Fame- Men	Bryan Ferry
1987, 2008	Best Dressed Men	Heinrich, Prince of Fürstenberg
1987, 1989, 1990, 1994	Best Dressed Men, Hall of Fame- Men	James Niven, heir of David Niven
1987	Best Dressed Men Fashion Professionals	Richard Carroll, haberdasher on Rodeo Drive
1987	Best Dressed Men Fashion Professionals	Romeo Gigli
1987, 1991	Best Dressed Men Fashion Professionals	Jean-Louis Dumas
1987, 1988, 1989	Best Dressed Men Fashion Professionals, Hall of Fame- Men	Beppe Modenese, president of the National Chamber of Italian Fashion
1987, 1989	Best Dressed Men Fashion Professionals	Paul Smith
1988	Best Dressed Women	Benazir Bhutto
1988, 1989	Best Dressed Women, Hall of Fame- Women	Brooke Astor
1988	Best Dressed Women	Karole Armitage
1988, 1990, 1991, 1993	Best Dressed Women, Special Citations, Hall of Fame- Women	Camilla Paravicini, daughter of Elizabeth Hope, Baroness Glendevon
1988, 1989, 1990, 1991	Best Dressed Women, Hall of Fame- Women	Nina Griscom
1988, 1989, 1993, 1994, 1995, 1996, 1997	Best Dressed Women, Hall of Fame- Women	Carolina Adriana Herrera-Pacanins, daughter of Carolina Herrera
1988, 1989, 1995, 1997, 1999, 2006	Best Dressed Women, Special Citation	Blaine Trump
1988, 1989, 1996	Best Dressed Women Fashion Professionals, Best Dressed Women, Special Citation	Gwendoline d'Urso Bemberg, employee at Vogue, Emanuel Ungaro
1988	Best Dressed Women Fashion Professionals	Dreda Mele, director of Armani France
1988, 1990, 1991	Best Dressed Women Fashion Professionals, Hall of Fame- Women	Carolyne Roehm
1988, 1992	Best Dressed Women Fashion Professionals, Dissidents	Jacqueline Beaurang, wife of Julian Schnabel
1988	Best Dressed Men	George H. W. Bush
1988	Best Dressed Men	Eric Boman, a freelancer for Vogue
1988, 1989, 1990, 1991, 1992	Best Dressed Men, Special Citations, Hall of Fame- Men, Enduring Images of Elegance	Comte Frederic Chandon of Briailles, father of Olivier Chandon de Brailles
1988, 1996, 1997, 1998	Best Dressed Men, Hall of Fame- Men	Graydon Carter
1988, 1990, 1991	Best Dressed Men, Hall of Fame- Men	Comte Paul de Ganay, owner of the Château de Courances
1988, 1989, 1990, 1992, 1994, 1995, 1997, 1998	Best Dressed Men, Special Citation	John F. Kennedy Jr.
1988, 1994, 1995	Best Dressed Men	Steve Martin
1988, 1990, 1993	Best Dressed Men, Hall of Fame- Men	Sonny Mehta
1988, 1989	Best Dressed Men Fashion Professionals	Gilles Dufour, right-hand man of Karl Lagerfeld at Chanel, art director at Balmain Diffusion Ready-to-Wear
1988	Best Dressed Men Fashion Professionals	Gene Pressman, heir of Fred Pressman
1988, 1989	Best Dressed Men Fashion Professionals	Alexander Vreeland, grandson of Diana Vreeland
1989	Citations	Mikhail Gorbachev
1989	Citations	David Dinkins
1989	Best Dressed Women	Jane Anderson, wife of Ambassador Guilford Dudley
1989	Best Dressed Women	Jenny Lumet
1989, 2000, 2001	Best Dressed Women, Hall of Fame- Women	Anne McNally, Fashion Director and Contributing Editor to Vanity Fair
1989	Best Dressed Women	Yvette Mimieux
1989	Best Dressed Women	Ivana Trump
1989, 1990, 1994	Best Dressed Women, Hall of Fame- Women	Daphne Guinness
1989, 1990, 1994	Best Dressed Women Fashion Professionals, Best Dressed Women	Laura Montalban, heiress of Ricardo Montalbán
1989	Best Dressed Women Fashion Professionals	Elizabeth Saltzman
1989	Best Dressed Women Fashion Professionals	Maria Snyder
1989, 1993	Best Dressed Women Fashion Professionals	Carla Sozzani
1989	Best Dressed Women Fashion Professionals	Cathy Hardwick, mentor of Tom Ford
1989, 1990, 1991, 1993, 1994, 1995, 1997	Best Dressed Men, Special Citations, Hall of Fame- Men	Kyril, Prince of Preslav
1989	Best Dressed Men	Alec Baldwin
1989	Best Dressed Men	Daniel Day-Lewis
1989	Best Dressed Men	Arsenio Hall
1989, 1991, 1993, 1994	Best Dressed Men, Hall of Fame- Men	Eddie Hayes
1989, 1990, 1991	Best Dressed Men, Hall of Fame- Men	Paul Newman
1989, 1991, 1993	Best Dressed Men Fashion Professionals	Massimo Ferragamo, heir of Salvatore Ferragamo
1990, 1992, 1993, 1994	Special Citations, Classicists, Best Dressed Women	Rosario Nadal
1990	Special Citations	Mariano Hugo, Prince of Windisch-Graetz
1990	Special Citations	Sophie Habsburg
1990, 1994	Best Dressed Women	Lady Sarah Chatto
1990	Best Dressed Women	Lady Annunziata Asquith, partner of Patrick Anson, 5th Earl of Lichfield
1990, 1994, 1996	Best Dressed Women, Best Dressed Women Fashion Professionals, Special Citation	Nally Bellati, author of books on Flexform, the Villa Massei, the Neotu Gallery
1990	Best Dressed Women	Princess Elizabeth von Sachsen-Weimar, daughter of Baroness Elisabeth of Wangenheim-Winterstein
1990	Best Dressed Women	Alma Powell
1990	Best Dressed Women	Julia Roberts
1990	Best Dressed Men	Harry Connick Jr.
1990	Best Dressed Men	Matt Dillon
1990	Best Dressed Men	Magic Johnson
1990	Best Dressed Men	Robin Smith-Ryland, from a prominent family of Sherbourne, Warwickshire
1990	Best Dressed Men	David Robin Francis Guy Greville, 8th Earl of Warwick
1991, 1992	Hall of Fame- Women, Enduring Images of Elegance	Anne Slater, who threw parties at her multi-million dollar apartment on Fifth Avenue.
1991	Best Dressed Women	Comtesse Florence de Dampierre, who wrote a book about Tessa Kennedy.
1991	Best Dressed Women	Geraldine Kaelin, wife of James Hanson, Baron Hanson.
1991	Best Dressed Women	Missus Anne Jones
1991, 1992, 1993	Best Dressed Women, Classicists, Hall of Fame- Women	Jessye Norman
1991, 1992, 1996	Best Dressed Women, Classicists, Special Citation	Mary Robinson
1991	Best Dressed Women	Carole Rochas, wife of a producer on the film Lancelot du Lac.
1991, 1993	Best Dressed Women	Lily Safra
1991, 1993, 1994	Best Dressed Women Fashion Professionals	Isabel Canovas, designer for Hermès, Louis Vuitton, Dior who started a jewelry boutique on the Avenue Montaigne.
1991, 1993	Best Dressed Women Fashion Professionals, Hall of Fame- Women	Josie Natori
1991, 1994	Best Dressed Men, Hall of Fame- Men	Dixon Boardman, vice-chairman of the Forbes family Trust, president of Optima Asset Management, hedge fund advisor in the Financial Times.
1991, 1997	Best Dressed Men, Hall of Fame- Men	Ed Bradley
1991, 1992, 1993, 1995, 1998, 2001	Best Dressed Men, Hall of Fame- Men	Prince Pierre d'Arenberg, board member of the Arenberg Foundation.
1991	Best Dressed Men	Tom Foley
1991, 1995, 1999	Best Dressed Men	Gene Hovis, cook who studied under Dione Lucas.
1991, 1993, 1994, 1995, 1996, 2000	Best Dressed Men, Hall of Fame- Men	Henry Kravis
1991	Best Dressed Men	Peter Martins
1991, 1992, 1993, 1994	Best Dressed Men, Hall of Fame- Men	Pat Riley
1991, 1994, 1995	Best Dressed Men, Hall of Fame- Men	John Stefanidis
1991, 1992, 1993	Best Dressed Men, Hall of Fame- Men	Galen Weston
1991	Best Dressed Men Fashion Professionals	Joseph Abboud
1991, 1994	Best Dressed Men Fashion Professionals	Luciano Barbera
1991, 1992, 1993, 1994, 1995, 1996, 1997	Best Dressed Men Fashion Professionals, Best Dressed Men, Special Citation, Hall of Fame- Men	Hamish Bowles
1991	Best Dressed Men Fashion Professionals	Gimmo Etro
1991, 1992, 1993	Best Dressed Men Fashion Professionals, Best Dressed Men	Christian Lacroix
1992	Dissidents	Caridad Rivera, wife of Matthew Modine
1992, 2006	Dissidents, Best Dressed	Isabella Blow
1992	Dissidents	Naomi Campbell
1992, 1995, 1996, 1997, 1998, 1999, 2000	Dissidents, Special Citation, Best Dressed Women	Victoire de Castellane, lead designer at Dior Fine Jewellery
1992, 1993, 2007	Dissidents, Best Dressed Women Fashion Professionals, Best Dressed	Carlyne Cerf de Dudzeele
1992	Dissidents	Neneh Cherry
1992	Dissidents	Juliette Lewis
1992	Dissidents	Courtney Love
1992, 1994	Classicists, Hall of Fame- Women	Lucy Birley
1992, 1995	Classicists, Hall of Fame- Women	Amanda Burden
1992	Classicists	Hélène de Lamotte, wife of Charles-Louis de Mortemart
1992, 1993, 1994, 1995, 1996, 1997	Classicists, Best Dressed Women, Special Citation	Veronica de Beracasa y de Uribe, wife of Randolph Apperson Hearst
1992, 1993, 1994, 1995, 1996	Best Dressed Men, Hall of Fame- Men	Francesco Clemente
1992	Best Dressed Men	Thierry Despont, architect of the interiors of 220 Central Park South, the Statue of Liberty restoration, and the remodelling of the Herbert N. Straus House
1992	Best Dressed Men	Terence Stamp
1993, 1996	Best Dressed Women, Special Citation	Sharon Stone
1993, 1994	Best Dressed Women	Marina Allegra Federica Silvia Tondato, wife of Ashley Hicks
1993, 1994, 1995, 1996, 1997, 1998, 2007	Best Dressed Women	Serena Armstrong-Jones, Countess of Snowdon
1993, 1994	Best Dressed Women	Harumi Klossowski de Rola, heiress of Balthus
1993, 2000	Best Dressed Women, Hall of Fame- Women	Gayfryd McNabb MacLean Johnson, wife of Saul Phillip Steinberg
1993	Best Dressed Women	Liza Bruce, swimwear merchant who helped develop new lycra-based fabrics
1993, 1994	Best Dressed Men	Fernando de Cordoba Hohenlohe, heir of Gonzalo Fernández de Córdoba, 9th Duke of Arión
1993, 1996, 1997, 2000	Best Dressed Men, Special Citation, Hall of Fame- Men	Doctor Daniel Baker Upper East Side cosmetic surgeon
1993, 1995	Best Dressed Men, Special Citation	Martin Amis
1993	Best Dressed Men	Andrew Lauren, heir of Ralph Lauren
1993, 1995, 1996, 1997, 1998	Best Dressed Men, Special Citation, Hall of Fame- Men	Denzel Washington
1993, 1994, 2001	Best Dressed Men, Hall of Fame- Men	Charles Gwathmey
1993	Best Dressed Men Fashion Professionals	Gerard Pipart, an employer of Maxime de la Falaise
1994	Best Dressed Women	Donatella Asta, a staff member of the World Monuments Fund
1994, 1996, 1997	Best Dressed Women, Special Citation	Danielle Steel
1994, 1995	Best Dressed Women, Special Citation	Pia Getty
1994, 1995, 1996, 1997, 1998, 1999, 2006	Best Dressed Women, Special Citation, Hall of Fame- Women	Marie-Chantal, Crown Princess of Greece
1994, 1995	Best Dressed Women, Special Citation	Alexandra von Fürstenberg
1994, 1995, 1996	Best Dressed Women Fashion Professionals, Best Dressed Women, Hall of Fame- Women	Amy Fine Collins
1994	Best Dressed Women	Natasha Fraser, employee of Andy Warhol, Karl Lagerfeld, John Fairchild
1994	Hall of Fame- Men	Count Jean-Charles de Ravenel, who makes Collages about his international travel, art history interests
1994, 1995	Best Dressed Men, Special Citation	Hugh Grant
1994, 1995, 2007, 2008, 2009	Best Dressed Men, Special Citation	Brad Pitt
1994, 2000, 2001	Best Dressed Men, Hall of Fame- Men	Gordon Matthew Thomas Sumner
1994	Best Dressed Men Fashion Professionals	Daniel de la Falaise, nephew of Loulou de la Falaise
1994	Best Dressed Men Fashion Professionals	Sergio Loro Piana
1994	Best Dressed Men Fashion Professionals	Jeffrey Miller, set designer, prop stylist for House & Garden, Gourmet, Real Simple, Vogue, Town & Country, The New York Times, the Museum of Modern Art, Bergdorf Goodman, Barneys New York, and Anthropologie.
1995	Best Dressed Women	Debonnaire von Bismarck
1995, 1996, 1999	Best Dressed Women, Hall of Fame- Women	Cosima von Bülow Pavoncelli
1995, 1996	Best Dressed Women, Hall of Fame- Women	Amanda Harlech
1995, 1997, 2004, 2005, 2007	Best Dressed Women, Special Citation	Jemima Goldsmith
1995	Best Dressed Women	Angela Carrubba Pintaldi, designer of jewelry, including a line for Armani
1995, 1996, 1997, 1998	Special Citation, Best Dressed Women	Gwyneth Paltrow
1995, 1997	Special Citation	Clarissa Alcock San Román, wife of Edgar Bronfman Jr.
1995, 1996, 1997, 1998, 2000	Special Citation, Best Dressed Women	Uma Thurman
1995	Special Citation	Annie Lennox
1995, 1996, 1997	Special Citation	Cecile Iny, wife of Ezra Zilkha
1995, 1997	Best Dressed Men, Hall of Fame- Men	Luigi d'Urso, husband of Inès de La Fressange
1995, 1996	Best Dressed Men, Hall of Fame- Men	Fernando Sánchez
1995, 1997	Best Dressed Men, Special Citation	Bryant Gumbel
1995	Best Dressed Men	Mayor Willie Brown
1995	Best Dressed Men	Imran Khan
1995	Best Dressed Men, Hall of Fame- Men	David Metcalfe, insurance executive who precipitated the sale of Sotheby's to an American financier
1995	Best Dressed Men	Christian Louboutin
1995, 1996, 1997, 1998, 2000, 2004	Best Dressed Men, Special Citation, Best Dressed Fashion Professionals- Men	Tom Ford
1995, 2000	Special Citation, Best Dressed Men	Fernando Botero
1995, 1997	Special Citation	Harrison Ford
1995	Special Citation	Khalil Rizk, art dealer & society host whose ball at the Knickerbocker Club made the upper crust refer to him as "the new Brooke Astor"
1995	Special Citation	Luis Dominguez
1996, 1999, 2000	Best-Dressed Women, Hall of Fame- Women	Archduchess Maria Beatrice of Austria, mother of Olympia von und zu Arco-Zinneberg
1996	Best-Dressed Women	Carolyn Bessette-Kennedy
1996, 1997, 1999, 2001, 2002, 2004	Best-Dressed Women	Nicole Kidman
1996, 1997, 1999, 2000, 2001	Best-Dressed Women, Hall of Fame- Women	Marie-Josée Kravis
1996, 1997	Best-Dressed Women, Special Citation	Victoria Lou Schott, wife of Evelyn de Rothschild
1996, 1998	Best-Dressed Women, Hall of Fame- Women	Faye Wattleton
1996, 1997	Special Citation	Goldie Hawn
1996	Special Citation	Winona Ryder
1996	Special Citation	Marguerite Littman
1996	Special Citation	María Amalia Lacroze de Fortabat
1996, 1997, 1998, 1999	Special Citation, Best Dressed Women	Eliza Reed, stepdaughter of Oscar de la Renta
1996	Special Citation	Isabel Preysler
1996, 1997	Best Dressed Men, Hall of Fame- Men	The Honorable Harry Fane, an heir of David Fane, 15th Earl of Westmorland
1996	Best Dressed Men	Charles Gwathmey
1996	Best Dressed Men	Jon Bon Jovi
1996, 1997, 1999	Best Dressed Men, Special Citation, Hall of Fame- Men	Wynton Marsalis
1996, 1997, 1999	Best Dressed Men, Hall of Fame- Men	Evelyn de Rothschild
1997, 1998	Best Dressed Women, Hall of Fame- Women	Rosamond Bernier
1997	Best Dressed Women	Elizabeth Fly Vagliano, wife of Felix Rohatyn
1997	Special Citation	India Hicks
1997, 2001, 2002, 2004, 2007	Special Citation, Best Dressed Women	Marina Rust, a promoter of Philip B.
1997, 2001, 2002, 2004, 2005, 2006	Special Citation, Best Dressed Women	Kate Moss
1997, 1998, 2006	Best Dressed Men	Prince William, Duke of Cambridge
1997	Best Dressed Men	Gerald Maxwell Rivera
1997, 2007	Best Dressed Men	Colin Campbell, 7th Earl Cawdor
1997, 1999, 2000	Best Dressed Men, Hall of Fame- Men	Madison Cox, husband of Pierre Bergé
1997	Best Dressed Men	Tony Blair
1997, 1998	Best Dressed Men	Rupert Everett
1997, 1998, 2001, 2002, 2006, 2012	Best Dressed Men, Best Dressed Fashion Professionals- Men	Ozwald Boateng
1997, 1998, 2000	Best Dressed Men, Hall of Fame- Men	Phillips Hathaway, head of the 18th century Continental Furniture department at Sotheby's
1997, 2008	Best Dressed Men	Matt Lauer
1997, 2007	Special Citation, Best Dressed	David Armstrong-Jones, 2nd Earl of Snowdon
1997, 1998, 2000	Special Citation, Best Dressed Men	Count Roffredo Gaetani, boyfriend of Ivana Trump
1998, 1999	Best Dressed Women	Brooke Douglass de Ocampo, wife of Julian Metcalfe
1998	Best Dressed Women	Cameron Diaz
1998, 1999	Best Dressed Women, Hall of Fame- Women	Patricia Herrera, daughter of Carolina Herrera
1998, 1999, 2004, 2009	Best Dressed Women	Aerin Lauder
1998	Best Dressed Women	Jade Jagger
1998	Best Dressed Fashion Professionals- Women	Rei Kawakubo
1998	Best Dressed Fashion Professionals- Women	Vivienne Westwood
1998, 2001, 2002	Best Dressed Fashion Professionals- Women, Best Dressed Women	Cecilia Dean
1998, 2000	Best Dressed Men, Hall of Fame- Men	Kenneth Chenault
1998	Best Dressed Men	Tony Duquette
1998, 1999	Best Dressed Men, Hall of Fame- Men	Charles Allsopp, 6th Baron Hindlip
1998	Best Dressed Men	Thomas Kempner, husband of Nan Kempner
1998, 1999	Best Dressed Men, Hall of Fame- Men	Prince Michael of Kent
1998, 2007	Best Dressed Men	Lenny Kravitz
1998, 1999	Best Dressed Men	Dylan McDermott
1998	Best Dressed Fashion Professionals- Men	John Bartlett, clothing designer with degrees from Harvard University & the Fashion Institute of Technology
1998, 1999, 2000, 2001	Best Dressed Fashion Professionals- Men, Best Dressed Men, Hall of Fame- Men	Patrick McCarthy
1999, 2000, 2001, 2002, 2004	Best Dressed Women	Susan Fales-Hill
1999	Best Dressed Women	Victoria Newhouse
1999, 2000	Best Dressed Women	Chloë Sevigny
1999, 2000	Best Dressed Women, Hall of Fame- Women	Ann Summers, wife of the owner of Martin Summers Fine Art
1999, 2004, 2006, 2008	Best Dressed Men	Jonathan Becker, a photographer for Vanity Fair
1999, 2000, 2001	Best Dressed Men, Hall of Fame- Men	John Cahill, husband of Fifth Avenue doyenne Anne Slater
1999, 2001	Best Dressed Men, Hall of Fame- Men	Michael Cannon, men's fashion editor for Town & Country
1999	Best Dressed Men	Michael Douglas
1999	Best Dressed Men	Philipp von Hapsburg, a marketing salesman at Fundsmith
1999, 2000, 2001	Best Dressed Men, Hall of Fame- Men	Rupert Ludwig Ferdinand zu Loewenstein-Wertheim-Freudenberg
1999, 2001	Best Dressed Men	Robert Rufino, Style Director at House Beautiful
1999, 2000, 2001, 2002	Best Dressed Men, Hall of Fame- Men	Taki Theodoracopulos
2000, 2001, 2002, 2008	Best Dressed Women	Julia Koch
2000	Best Dressed Women	Christina Macaya, a socialite from Mallorca
2000, 2001, 2002	Best Dressed Women	Enid Nemy
2000	Best Dressed Women	Rena Kirdar Sindi
2000, 2004	Best Dressed Women	Sally Tadayon, wife of Rufus Keppel, 10th Earl of Albemarle
2000	Best Dressed Men	Geoffrey Holder
2000, 2001	Best Dressed Men	Yo-Yo Ma
2000	Best Dressed Men	Chow Yun-fat
2001, 2002	Best Dressed Women	Halle Berry
2001, 2002, 2004, 2005, 2006	Best Dressed Women	Queen Rania of Jordan
2001, 2002	Best Dressed Women	Mitsuko Uchida
2001, 2002, 2005, 2008	Best Dressed Women	Carine Roitfeld
2001, 2002	Best Dressed Women	Anh Duong
2001, 2002	Best Dressed Men	Colin Powell
2001, 2002	Best Dressed Men	Geoffrey Beene
2001, 2004, 2005, 2006, 2007	Best Dressed Men	Anderson Cooper
2001, 2002	Best Dressed Men	Giuseppe Cipriani Junior, heir of the founder of Harry's Bar, Venice
2001, 2002	Best Dressed Men	Lars Nilsson
2001	Best Dressed Men	Mish Tworkowski, a jeweler based in Palm Beach, Florida
2001, 2002, 2004	Best Dressed Men	Sean Combs
2001, 2006, 2009	Best Dressed Men	Tiki Barber
2001	Best Dressed Men	John Waters
2004	Best Dressed	Cate Blanchett
2004, 2005, 2006, 2007	Best Dressed Women	Sofia Coppola
2004	Best Dressed	Princess Olga of Savoy-Aosta
2004, 2005, 2006	Best Dressed Women	Oprah Winfrey
2004, 2006, 2007, 2008	Best Dressed	David Beckham
2004, 2005, 2006, 2007	Best Dressed Men	George Clooney
2004, 2005, 2006, 2007, 2008	Best Dressed Men	Lapo Elkann
2004, 2006, 2008	Best Dressed	Pavlos, Crown Prince of Greece
2004, 2005	Best Dressed Men	Jude Law
2004, 2005	Best Dressed Men	Bernard-Henri Lévy
2004, 2006	Best Dressed	Brian Williams
2004	Best Dressed	Eliza Reed Bolen, stepdaughter of Oscar de la Renta
2005, 2006, 2007	Best Dressed Women	Alba Clemente, who has performed with Pink Martini
2005	Best Dressed Men	Wes Anderson
2005	Best Dressed Men	André 3000
2005	Best Dressed Women	Sienna Miller
2005, 2008	Best Dressed Men	chief executive officer Charles Finch
2005	Best Dressed Women	Vanessa Traina, an heiress who spent $2500 for a ticket to a De Young Museum fundraiser
2005	Best Dressed Women	Victoria Traina, an heiress who spent $2500 for a ticket to a De Young Museum fundraiser
2005, 2006	Best Dressed Women	Constance "Connie" Polan, wife of Jerry Wald
2005	Best Dressed Men	Ogden Mills Phipps
2005, 2006	Best Dressed Men	Charlie Watts
2006	Best Dressed	Selma Blair
2006, 2012	Best Dressed	Charlotte Casiraghi
2006, 2007, 2008	Best Dressed	Fran Lebowitz
2006	Best Dressed	Condoleezza Rice
2006	Best Dressed	Gwen Stefani
2006, 2007, 2009	Best Dressed	Renée Zellweger
2006, 2007, 2008	Best Dressed	Count Manfredi Della Gherardesca, husband of an heiress of Prince Rupert Loewenstein
2006	Best Dressed	His Royal Highness, Prince Ernst August of Hanover I
2006	Best Dressed	Richard Johnson, Columnist
2006, 2008	Best Dressed	Kanye West
2006	Best Dressed	Sheherazade Goldsmith
2006, 2008	Best Dressed	Zac Goldsmith
2006	Best Dressed	Eugenia Silva
2006, 2009	Best Dressed	Alejandro Santo Domingo
2006, 2007	Best Dressed	Isabel Toledo
2006, 2007	Best Dressed	Ruben Toledo
2006, 2007, 2008	Best Dressed	Alexandra Kotur
2006, 2007	Best Dressed	Hedi Slimane
2006	Best Dressed	Stella Tennant
2006	Best Dressed	Mario Testino
2007	Best Dressed	Charlotte Gainsbourg
2007, 2012	Best Dressed	Princess Alexandra of Greece, heiress of Prince Michael of Greece and Denmark
2007	Best Dressed	Marjorie Gubelmann
2007	Best Dressed	Mafalda von Hessen
2007, 2008, 2009	Best Dressed	Michelle Obama
2007	Best Dressed	Bee Shaffer, daughter of Anna Wintour
2007, 2008	Best Dressed	Tilda Swinton
2007, 2008	Best Dressed	Ivanka Trump
2007, 2012	Best Dressed	Richard Esterhuysen Grant
2007, 2008	Best Dressed	Luis Medina, heir of Victoria Eugenia Fernández de Córdoba, 18th Duchess of Medinaceli
2007, 2008	Best Dressed	Rafael de Medina, 20th Duke of Feria
2007	Best Dressed	Hidetoshi Nakata
2007	Best Dressed	Nicolas Sarkozy
2007	Best Dressed	Gay Talese
2007	Best Dressed	Victoria Beckham
2007	Best Dressed	Isabella Campbell, Countess Cawdor
2007	Best Dressed	Damon Dash
2007, 2009	Best Dressed	Rachel Roy
2007	Best Dressed	Frédéric Fekkai
2007	Best Dressed	Shirin von Wulffen, director for communications for Tom Ford
2007, 2008	Best Dressed	Mitch Glazer
2007, 2008	Best Dressed	Kelly Lynch
2007	Best Dressed	Ashton Kutcher
2007	Best Dressed	Demi Moore
2007, 2009	Best Dressed	David Lauren
2007	Best Dressed	Lauren Bush
2007, 2008	Best Dressed	Angelina Jolie
2007	Best Dressed	Lisa Eisner, a jeweler based in Los Angeles
2007	Best Dressed	Amy Astley
2007, 2009	Best Dressed	Tory Burch
2007	Best Dressed	Jefferson Hack
2007	Best Dressed	Liya Kebede
2007	Best Dressed	Margherita Missoni
2007	Best Dressed	Stefano Pilati
2007	Best Dressed	Michael Roberts, Fashion Journalist
2007, 2008	Best Dressed	Katherine Ross, senior vice president of communications for Louis Vuitton Moët Hennessy
2008	Best Dressed	Queen Mathilde of Belgium
2008	Best Dressed	Carla Bruni
2008	Best Dressed	Evelyn Lauder
2008, 2012	Best Dressed	Catherine, Duchess of Cambridge
2008	Best Dressed	Sarah Jessica Parker
2008, 2009	Best Dressed	Superintendent Diana Taylor
2008	Best Dressed	Daniel Craig
2008	Best Dressed	Bryan Lourd
2008, 2012	Best Dressed	Morley Safer
2008	Best Dressed	Sidney Goldman, wife of chief executive officer Charles Finch
2008	Best Dressed	Iris Apfel
2008, 2009, 2012	Best Dressed	Stacey Bendet
2008	Best Dressed	Christy Turlington
2008	Best Dressed	Andrea Clemente, heir of Francesco Clemente
2008	Best Dressed	Pietro Clemente, heir of Francesco Clemente
2008	Best Dressed	Fiona Kotur Marin, sister of Alexandra Kotur
2009	Best Dressed	Queen Letizia of Spain
2009	Best Dressed	Chiara Clemente, director of "Our City Dreams"
2009	Best Dressed	Penélope Cruz
2009	Best Dressed	Kathy Freston
2009	Best Dressed	Agnes Gund
2009	Best Dressed	Anne Hathaway
2009, 2012	Best Dressed	Alicia Keys
2009, 2012	Best Dressed	Moza bint Nasser
2009	Best Dressed	Kelly Ripa
2009	Best Dressed	Lizzie Rudnick, wife of Jonathan Tisch
2009, 2012	Best Dressed	Arpad Busson
2009	Best Dressed	Daniel Craig
2009, 2012	Best Dressed	Matteo Marzotto of the Marzotto Group
2009	Best Dressed	Barack Obama
2009	Best Dressed	Ogden Phipps II, heir of Ogden Mills Phipps
2009	Best Dressed	Roo Rogers
2009	Best Dressed	Cy Twombly
2009	Best Dressed	Paloma Cuevas, wife of Enrique Ponce
2009	Best Dressed	Enrique Ponce
2009	Best Dressed	Michael Bloomberg
2009	Best Dressed	Kelly Wanger, editor at Random House
2009	Best Dressed	David Mortimer, president of The American Assembly
2009	Best Dressed	Natalia Vodianova
2009	Best Dressed	Justin Portman, in line to become Viscount Portman
2009	Best Dressed	Cayetana Fitz-James Stuart, 18th Duchess of Alba
2009	Best Dressed	Nicky Haslam
2009, 2012	Best Dressed	Iké Udé
2009	Best Dressed	Bruce Weber
2009	Best Dressed	Georgina Chapman
2009	Best Dressed	Ali Hewson
2009	Best Dressed	Mathilde Meyer-Agostinelli, director of communications for Prada France
2009	Best Dressed	Candy Pratts Price, executive fashion director of Style.com
2009	Best Dressed	Franca Sozzani
2009	Best Dressed	Jane Lauder
2009	Best Dressed	Stavros Niarchos, heir of Philip Niarchos
2009	Best Dressed	Eugénie Niarchos, heiress of Philip Niarchos
2009	Best Dressed	Carla Bruni
2009	Best Dressed	Liliane Bettencourt
2009	Best Dressed	Catherine Deneuve
2009	Best Dressed	Lapo Elkann
2009	Best Dressed	Count Manfredi Della Gherardesca
2012	Best Dressed	Fan Bingbing, actress
2012	Best Dressed	Jessica Chastain, actress
2012	Best Dressed	Mary, Crown Princess of Denmark, wife of Crown Prince Frederik of Denmark, future King of Denmark; mother of four
2012	Best Dressed	Diane Kruger, actress
2012	Best Dressed	Léa Seydoux, actress and model
2012	Best Dressed	Elettra Wiedemann, fashion model, entrepreneur, and aspiring triathlete
2012	Best Dressed	Tom Brady, quarterback for the New England Patriots
2012	Best Dressed	Victor Cruz, wide receiver for the New York Giants
2012	Best Dressed	Prince Harry, Apache Helicopter pilot with the British Army Air Corps
2012	Best Dressed	Jay-Z, rapper, songwriter, entrepreneur
1997, 2008, 2012	Best Dressed	Matt Lauer
2012	Best Dressed	Eddie Redmayne, actor
2012	Best Dressed	Vito Schnabel, art dealer
2012	Best Dressed	Ginevra Elkann and Giovanni Gaetani Dell'Aquila D'Aragona, film producer and chairman of the Pinacoteca Agnelli / farmer and agricultural entrepreneur.
2012	Best Dressed	Colin and Livia Firth, actor / film producer and creative director of Eco Age; founder of the Green Carpet Challenge
2012	Best Dressed	Lauren and Andrés Santo Domingo, contributing editor for Vogue and co-founder and creative director of Moda Operandi / music executive
2012	Best Dressed	Bill Cunningham, photographer for "On the Street" and "Evening Hours" columns in the New York Times Style section
2012	Best Dressed	Michelle Harper, brand consultant
2012	Best Dressed	Jean Pigozzi, entrepreneur, photographer, and art collector
2012	Best Dressed	Erika Bearman, senior vice president of global communications at Oscar de la Renta
2012	Best Dressed	Poppy Delevingne, model, actress, and British Fashion Council ambassador
2012	Best Dressed	Farida Khelfa, actress, director, and ambassador of Schiaparelli.
2012	Best Dressed	Stella McCartney, fashion designer
2012	Best Dressed	Robert Rabensteiner, fashion editor at L'Uomo Vogue
2012	Best Dressed	Ulyana Sergeenko, designer
2012	Best Dressed	Carlos Souza, worldwide brand ambassador for Valentino
2012	Best Dressed	Lizzie Tisch, consultant
2012	Best Dressed	Heinrich, Prince of Fürstenberg, entrepreneur

== International Best Dressed Hall of Fame List ==
=== Women ===
- Cayetana Fitz-James Stuart, 18th Duchess of Alba, socialite, President of the House of Alba Foundation; Seville (2011)
- Lily Auchincloss, journalist (1980)
- Stacey Bendet, creative director and C.E.O., Alice + Olivia; New York (2014)
- Julia Rush Biddle, socialite; Philadelphia (1964)
- Catherine, Duchess of Cambridge; Kensington Palace (2014)
- Kitty Carlisle Hart, actress, fine-arts authority, former chairman of the New York State Council on the Arts, widow of playwright Moss Hart; New York and Palm Beach (1994).
- Misty Copeland, ballerina (2015)
- Lucie de la Falaise, fashion stylist, model, wife of Marlon Richards; London (1997).
- Betty Furness, consumer reporter-advocate, former actress; New York (1986).
- Lauren Hutton, model and actress, New York (2017).
- Sheikha Moza bint Nasser al-Missned of Qatar, Chairperson of the Qatar Foundation for Education, Science and Community Development; UNESCO special envoy for basic and higher education; Doha, Qatar (2015).
- Lauren Santo Domingo (Davis), fashion editor, entrepreneur; New York and Paris (2017).
- Chloë Sevigny, actress; New York (2019).
- Anne Slater, social figure; New York (1991).
- Alexis Smith, actress; New York (1978).
- Mrs. Ray Stark (Fran), socialite, married to the film producer, daughter of Fanny Brice, mother of Vanity Fair contributing editor Wendy Stark; Los Angeles (1988).
- Mrs. Saul Steinberg (Gayfryd), socialite; New York (2000).
- Geraldine Stutz, former president of Henri Bendel; New York (1965).
- Mrs. Martin Summers (Ann), European socialite; London (2000).
- Mrs. T. Suffern Tailer (Jean), socialite; Palm Beach (1980).
- Queen Sirikit of Thailand, Bangkok (1965).
- Tilda Swinton, actress, Nairn, Scotland (2016).
- Margaret Thatcher, Baroness Thatcher, former prime minister of the United Kingdom; London (1990).
- Mrs. Lawrence Copley Thaw (Lee), socialite, Sotheby's executive; New York (1990).
- Mrs. Harry Theodoracopulos (Betsy Pickering Kaiser) socialite, Galanos muse, former model; Santa Barbara (1967).
- Mrs. Taki Theodoracopulos (Princess Alexandra Schönberg-Hartenstein); New York and Gstaad (1990).
- Pauline Trigère, fashion designer; New York (1964).
- Tina Turner, singer; Zurich (1996).
- Gloria Vanderbilt, author, artist, fashion designer; New York (1970).
- Adrienne Vittadini, fashion designer; New York (1995).
- Diana Vreeland, former Vogue editor in chief, special consultant to the Metropolitan Museum of Art's Costume Institute, international fashion guru; New York (1964).
- Mrs. Jerry Wald (Connie), hostess; Beverly Hills (2006).
- Baroness Louise de Waldner, gardener; Provence (1995).
- Baroness Sylvia de Waldner, Brazilian-born socialite; Paris (1986).
- Diana, Princess of Wales, London (1989).
- Faye Wattleton, author, public-policy adviser; New York (1998).
- The Hon. Hilary Weston, former model, former lieutenant governor of Ontario, business executive, author; Toronto (1987).
- Mrs. R. Thornton Wilson Jr. (Josie), socialite, hostess; New York (1985).
- Wallis Simpson, Duchess of Windsor, married to the former Edward VIII, King of the United Kingdom, Emperor of India, who abdicated to marry her; Paris (1958).
- Lady Amelia Windsor, member of the British royal family (2017).
- Mrs. Norman K. Winston (Rosita), socialite, married to the real-estate mogul; New York (1961).
- Dame Anna Wintour, Vogue editor in chief; New York (1997).
- Mrs. Ann Woodward, socialite, married to banker and sportsman William Woodward Junior; New York (1954).
- Mrs. Charles Wrightsman (Jayne Wrightsman), socialite, collector, museum patron, married to Charles Wrightsman; New York (1965).
- Mrs. Oscar Wyatt Jr. (Lynn), socialite, married to the oilman; Houston (1977).
- Poppy Whale (Pops), international socialite; London (1992).
- Loretta Young, actress, television star; Hollywood (1982).
- Princess Marie Youssoupov, art collector; Lausanne and Paris (1965).
- Baroness Gabrielle van Zuylen, international socialite; Paris (1978).
- Sophia Vari, sculptor and wife of Fernando Botero; Paris (1999).

=== Men ===
- Nicholas Aburn, socialite; New York (1984).
- Dean Acheson, former U.S. secretary of state; Washington, D.C. (1969).
- Gianni Agnelli, Fiat chairman; Turin (1970).
- David Ogilvy, 13th Earl of Airlie, former Lord Chamberlain to the Queen; Angus, Scotland (1972).
- Sir Hardy Amies, fashion designer; London (1974).
- Thomas Ammann, private art dealer; Zurich (1988).
- Prince Pierre d'Arenberg, host; Paris (2001).
- Giorgio Armani, fashion designer; Milan (1981).
- Arthur Ashe, professional tennis player; Richmond, Va. (1984).
- Fred Astaire, dancer, actor; Los Angeles (1968).
- Daniel Baker, cosmetic surgeon; New York (2000).
- Billy Baldwin (decorator); New York (1974).
- Wilkes Bashford, fashion retailer; San Francisco (1983).
- Sir Cecil Beaton, artist, photographer; London (1970).
- David Somerset, 11th Duke of Beaufort, landowner, partner in the Marlborough art gallery; London (1988).
- Jonathan Becker, photographer; New York (2008).
- David Beckham, footballer; Los Angeles (2010)
- John Russell, 13th Duke of Bedford, landowner; London and Santa Fe (1985).
- Harry Belafonte, musician; New York (1972).
- Bijan Pakzad, fashion designer; Beverly Hills (1989).
- Mark Birley, restaurateur, health-club proprietor, men's fragrance designer; London (1988).
- Earl Blackwell, Celebrity Service founder; New York (1980).
- Manolo Blahnik, shoe designer; London (1987).
- Bill Blass, fashion designer; New York (1970).
- Dixon Boardman, financier; New York and Locust Valley (1994).
- Ozwald Boateng, fashion designer; London (2012)
- David Bowie, musician; New York (1998).
- Hamish Bowles, Vogue European editor-at-large; New York (1997).
- Ed Bradley, 60 Minutes correspondent; New York (1997).
- Conte Brando Brandolini d'Adda, vintner; Venice and Paris (1980).
- David Brown, film producer, husband of former Cosmopolitan editor in chief Helen Gurley Brown; New York (1993).
- Gianni Bulgari, jewelry designer; Rome (1975).
- Arpad Busson, financier; London, St. Barth's, and New York (2012)
- Jeffrey Butler, publishing executive; Los Angeles (1978).
- John Cahill, financier; New York (2001).
- Michael Cannon, Town, Country editor-at-large; New York (2001).
- Pierre Cardin, fashion designer; Paris (1970).
- Graydon Carter, Vanity Fair editor; New York (1998).
- Nino Cerruti, fashion designer; Paris (1973).
- Comte Frédéric Chandon de Briailles, head of Moët, Chandon vineyard; Paris (1991).
- Kenneth Chenault, president and C.O.O. of American Express; New York (2000).
- Francesco Clemente, artist; New York and Naples (1996).
- George Clooney, actor, director, writer, producer; Los Angeles and Lake Como, Italy (2007).
- Alistair Cooke, journalist, radio and television personality; London (1984).
- Anderson Cooper, anchor, Anderson Cooper 360°; New York (2007).
- Hernando Courtright, owner of the Beverly Wilshire Hotel; Beverly Hills (1973).
- Madison Cox, landscape designer, author; New York (2000).
- Count Rodolfo Crespi, public-relations executive, socialite; Rome and New York (1970).
- Nicolas de Gunzburg, Editor-in-Chief of Town, Country, fashion editor (1971).
- Phillip Deng; Vienna (2018)
- Angelo Donghia, textile designer; New York (1977).
- Angier Biddle Duke, former U.S. ambassador to El Salvador, Spain, Denmark, and Morocco; New York and Southampton (1969).
- Prince Philip, Duke of Edinburgh, husband of Queen Elizabeth II; London (1969).
- Lapo Elkann, (2009).
- Ahmet Ertegun, co-chairman of the Atlantic Records Group; New York, Southampton, Paris, and Bodrum, Turkey. (1986).
- Kim d'Estainville, French businessman, famous Parisian personality; Paris (1978).
- Max Evans, fashion journalist; New York (1974).
- Robert Evans (producer), film producer; Los Angeles (1975).
- Douglas Fairbanks Jr., actor, film producer; Los Angeles (1969).
- John Fairchild, W magazine and WWD editor-at-large, author; New York (1988).
- Tom Fallon, fashion executive; New York (1981).
- Harry Fane, representative for Fulco di Verdura; London (1997).
- Bryan Ferry, musician; London (1990).
- Christopher Forbes, vice-chairman of Forbes Inc.; New York (1990).
- Tom Ford, fashion designer; London (2004).
- James Galanos, fashion designer; Los Angeles (1982).
- John Galliher, socialite; New York (1973).
- Comte Paul de Ganay, French and Argentinean businessman, polo player; Paris (1991).
- Count Manfredi della Gherardesca, art adviser, curator (2009).
- Giancarlo Giammetti, honorary chairman of Valentino; Rome (2006).
- Sir John Gielgud, actor; London (1982).
- Frank Gifford, broadcasting great, former N.F.L. star; New York (1975).
- Comte Hubert de Givenchy, fashion designer; Paris (1970).
- Senator Barry Goldwater, politician; Phoenix (1976).
- Jacques Grange, interior designer; Paris (1994).
- Cary Grant, actor; Los Angeles (1969).
- Pavlos, Crown Prince of Greece, investment-fund manager; London (2008).
- Robert L. Green, Playboy fashion director; New York (1972).
- Baron Nicolas de Gunzburg, Vogue editor; New York (1971).
- Charles Gwathmey, architect; New York (2001).
- Heinrich, Prince of Fürstenberg, businessman; Germany (2012).
- George Hamilton, actor; Los Angeles (1976).
- Mark Hampton, interior designer; New York (1991).
- Dorukhan Altinisik, doctor; New York (2008)
- Phillips Hathaway, European-furniture expert; New York (2000).
- Edward W. Hayes, attorney; New York (1994).
- Reinaldo Herrera, Vanity Fair contributing editor; New York and Caracas (1983).
- Charles Allsopp, 6th Baron Hindlip, former Christie's chairman; London (1999).
- Gregory Hines, actor, dancer; New York (1993).
- David Hockney, artist; Los Angeles (1986).
- James Hoge, Foreign Affairs editor in chief; New York (1987).
- Fred Hughes, Andy Warhol's business manager and executor; New York (1987).
- Peter Jennings, ABC news anchor; New York (1989).
- Steven Kaufman, fashion executive; New York (1988).
- Horace Kelland, writer; Charleston and Fishers Island (1975).
- Prince Michael of Kent; London (1999).
- Calvin Klein, fashion designer; New York (1983).
- Henry Kravis, financier; New York (2000).
- Karl Lagerfeld, designer, photographer, and publisher; Monaco (2014)
- Kenneth Jay Lane, jewelry designer, host; New York (1974).
- Bernard Lanvin, Lanvin Castilo owner; Paris (1970).
- Ralph Lauren, fashion designer; New York (1995).
- Armand de La Rochefoucauld 8th duc de Doudeauville, French aristocrat, Paris (1976)
- Alexander Liberman, Condé Nast editorial director, painter, photographer; New York (1981).
- Patrick Anson, 5th Earl of Lichfield, photographer; London (1971).
- John V. Lindsay; former mayor of New York City (1976).
- Henry Cabot Lodge Jr., statesman; Boston (1970).
- Prince Rupert Loewenstein-Wertheim-Freudenberg, investment manager; London (2001).
- Wynton Marsalis, musician; New York (1999).
- Patrick McCarthy, W magazine editor in chief; New York (2001).
- Henry McIlhenny, art collector, philanthropist; Philadelphia (1981).
- Rafael de Medina, 20th Duke of Feria, Spanish aristocrat; Madrid (2007).
- Sonny Mehta, Alfred A. Knopf president and editor in chief; New York (1993).
- David Metcalfe, insurance executive; London (1996).
- Philip Miller, C.E.O. of Saks Fifth Avenue; New York (1995).
- Ottavio Missoni, fashion designer; Milan (1982).
- Issey Miyake, fashion designer; Tokyo (1987).
- Beppe Modenese, fashion publicist, Moda Italiana founder, president of the National Chamber for Italian fashion; Milan (1989).
- Sami Mourid, Moroccan fashion icon, philanthropist and humanitarian; Paris (2014).
- Paul Newman, actor, racecar driver; Westport (1991).
- David Niven, actor; Los Angeles (1982).
- James Niven, Sotheby's senior vice president, son of David Niven; New York (1994).
- Colonel Serge Obolensky, businessman, Russian prince, World War II hero; New York (1970).
- Sir Angus Ogilvy, brother of the Earl of Airlie, husband of Princess Alexandra; London (1972).
- André Oliver, fashion designer; London (1973).
- Comte Hubert d'Ornano, C.E.O. of Sisley cosmetics; Paris (1995).
- Norman Parkinson, fashion photographer; London (1970).
- I.S.V. Patcévitch, Condé Nast president; New York (1970).
- Gregory Peck, actor; Los Angeles (1983).
- Senator Charles Percy, politician, former chairman of Bell, Howell; Chicago (1981).
- Charles Pfeiffer, American war hero, model, journalist, actor, television-commercial producer; New York (1989).
- Sir Sidney Poitier, actor, film director, diplomat; Los Angeles (1972).
- Kyril, Prince of Preslav, investment banker; London (1997).
- Count Jean-Charles de Ravenel, businessman, socialite; Lyford Cay and Paris (1994).
- President Ronald Reagan; Bel Air (1986).
- Alexis von Rosenberg, Baron de Redé, financier; Paris (1972).
- Samuel P. Reed, former Heritage Press publisher; New York (1985).
- Oscar de la Renta, fashion designer; New York, Kent, Connecticut, and Punta Cana (1973).
- Senator Abraham Ribicoff, politician; New York and Cornwall Bridge (1985).
- Pat Riley, former head coach and current president of the Miami Heat basketball team; Miami (1994).
- Baron David René de Rothschild, member of the banking family; Paris (1991).
- Baron Eric de Rothschild, member of the banking family; Paris (1970).
- Sir Evelyn de Rothschild, member of the banking family; London (1999).
- Baron Guy de Rothschild, member of the banking family; Paris (1985).
- Carlos Ortiz de Rozas, Argentinean ambassador to the Court of St. James's; Buenos Aires (1984).
- Yves Saint Laurent, fashion designer; Paris (1975).
- Robert Sakowitz, specialty retailer, consultant-firm executive; Houston (1975).
- Fernando Sanchez, fashion designer; New York and Marrakech (1996).
- Julio Mario Santo Domingo, financier, art collector; New York, Paris, Bogotá, and Barranquilla (1990).
- Joel Schumacher, film director; Los Angeles (1977).
- Peter Sharp, real-estate executive; New York (1988).
- Gil Shiva, businessman, socialite; New York (1995).
- Bobby Short, musician; New York (1986).
- King Juan Carlos I of Spain; Madrid (1987).
- John Stefanidis, interior designer; London and Patmos, Greece (1995).
- Sting, musician; Wiltshire, England (2001).
- André Leon Talley, Vogue editor-at-large; New York (1994).
- Antonio Tan-Torres III, metaphysician; Paris (2018).
- Taki Theodoracopulos, journalist; New York, Gstaad, Athens, and London (2001).
- Chip Tolbert, fashion journalist; New York (1974).
- Van Day Truex, Tiffany, Co. design director; New York (1974).
- Luigi d'Urso, Italian businessman, man-about-town; Paris (1997).
- Philippe Venet, fashion designer; Paris (1973).
- Yves Vidal, Knoll furniture company president; Tangier (1977).
- Charles, Prince of Wales; London (1980).
- Charlie Watts, musician; London (2006).
- Timurhan Camadan, Businessman; Istanbul (2015).
- Denzel Washington, actor, film director; Los Angeles (1998).
- John Weitz, fashion designer; New York (1970).
- Galen Weston, George Weston Ltd. chairman; Toronto (1993).
- Brian Williams, journalist; New York (2011)
- Paul Wilmot, publicist; New York (1993).
- Edward VIII, the Duke of Windsor, former King of the United Kingdom, abdicated throne for Wallis Simpson; Paris (1968).
- Tom Wolfe, writer; New York (1984).
- Michael York, actor; London (1977).
- Prince Dimitri of Yugoslavia, jewelry designer; New York (1994).
- Daniel Zarem, fashion retailer; New York (1978).
- Jerome Zipkin, socialite, real-estate executive; New York (1985).

== See also ==
- List of fashion awards
