= Luciana Pignatelli =

Italian socialite

- Born: Luciana Malgeri; January 13, 1935
- Died: October 13, 2008 (aged 73)
- Other name: Luciana Avedon
- Occupations: Princess, cosmetics spokesperson, author, jewelry designer

Luciana Pignatelli (born Luciana Malgeri; also known as Luciana Avedon; 13 January 1935–13 October 2008) was an Italian princess by marriage, socialite, and beauty spokesmodel for Camay soap and Eve of Roma cosmetics, who later became an author and jewelry designer.

== Early life ==
Luciana Malgeri was born in 1935 to Dr. Francesco Malgeri, a journalist, and Nelida Lenti Crespi Malgeri.

Her mother, a Brazilian woman from São Paulo, was married once before, in 1923 to Count Rodolfo ("Dino") Crespi. Dino Crespi was part of a powerful Italian-Brazilian family. With Crespi, Nelida had two sons: Rodolfo ("Rudi") Crespi and Marco Fabio Crespi. In 1929, Dino Crespi was murdered by a family driver. Nelida and her sons moved to Italy where she met Francesco Malgeri. The two married in 1934, and Luciana was born the next year. They remained married until his death in 1979, with Nelida dying in 1998.

Rudi Crespi would go on to be a director of Vogue Brasil and Vogue Mexico and married Vogue (magazine) and Vogue Italia editor Consuelo Crespi. He also was vice president for Crespi S.A., a São Paulo investment firm at which his brother Marco Fabio was president.

Luciana's father was editor of Il Messaggero from the time of her birth until 1941. As a young adult, her father had been supportive of the Fascist movement and cooperated with the fascistization of the Italian press. As editor, he modernized the newspaper but he also hired journalists who were not approved by the Fascists, including a Freemason and a Jewish person; in 1941, Benito Mussolini removed him as editor. He protested that he was still a Fascist but when the Germans occupied Rome they imprisoned him at Regina Coeli.

After the war, the family moved to São Paulo where Francesco Malgeri continued to work as a journalist and offered support to former Fascist leader Luigi Federzoni, who was living there in postwar exile. In 1950, as Luciana reached her teen years, the family returned to Italy where her father worked at the La Settimana Incom Illustrata magazine, and later as editor of Gazzetta del Popolo. In 1961 he moved to Milan and became CEO of Segisa, the publishing company of Il Giorno newspaper. From 1969 to 1976, he was president of the Agenzia Nazionale Stampa Associata.

== Career ==
=== Princess ===
In 1954, at 19 years old, Luciana Malgeri married Prince Don Nicolò ("Nicky") Maria Pignatelli Aragon Cortès, a Gulf Oil executive with titles that came from medieval kings and land ownership. The Pignattellis had two children: Princess Donna Fabrizia in 1956 and Prince Don Diego in 1958.

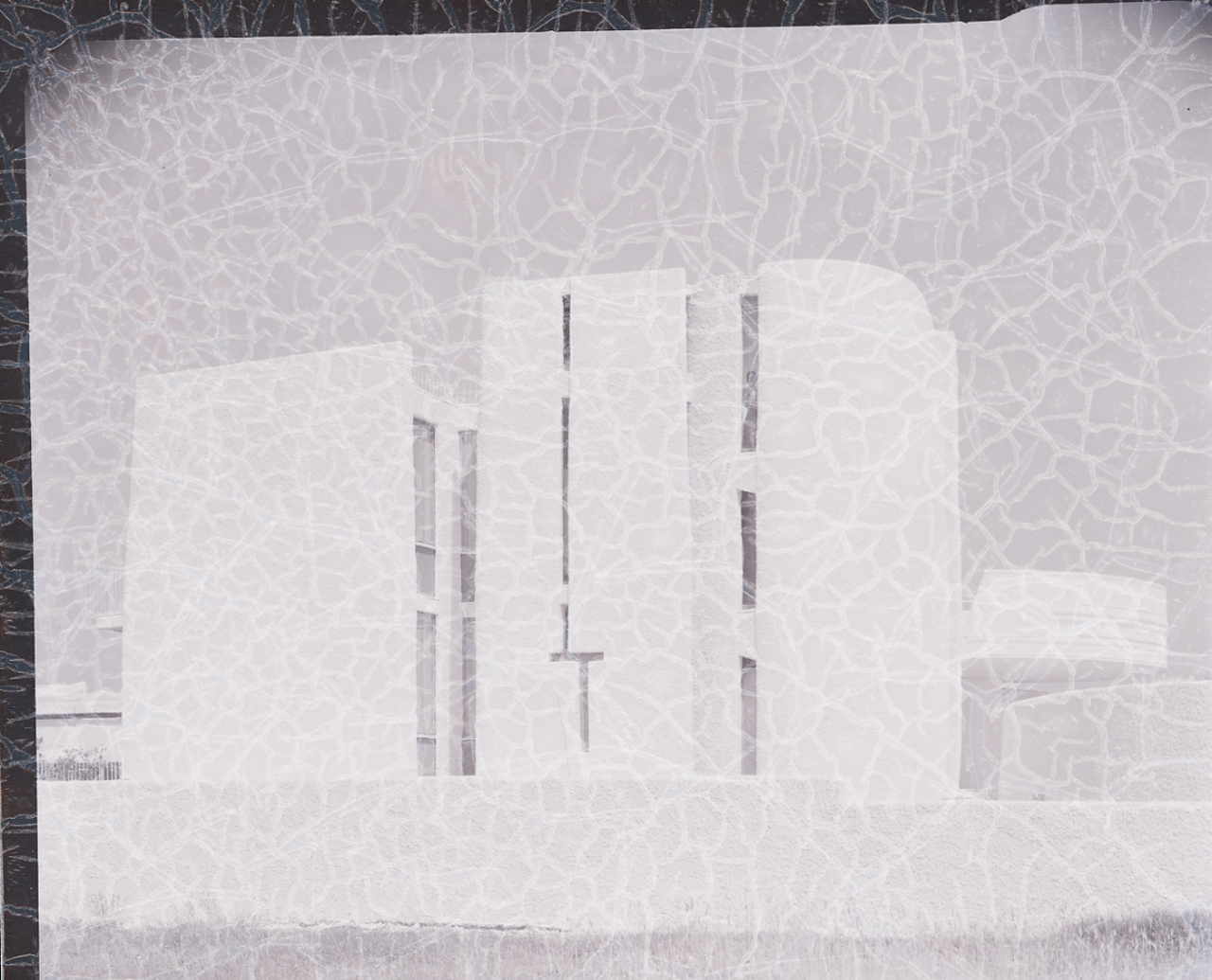
Villa La Saracena in Santa Marinella, gifted to Luciana Pignatelli by her father, the journalist Francesco Malgeri, and designed by architect Luigi Moretti. Photo by Paolo Monti, 1957.

In 1955, her father commissioned the building of a villa, La Saracena, along the coastline 60 kilometers north of Rome, as a holiday home for her and her new family. The building, with custom-designed furnishings, was completed in 1957. In 1959, she was on a March cover of Life magazine wearing a dress by Alberto Fabiani (Simonetta Colonna di Cesarò's then-husband) for a story about European fashions.

In 1962 and 1963, newspapers reported that the Pignatellis were separated: she and her children moved to Brazil, and when an Italian court order gave custody of the children to her husband she smuggled them to Portugal, where she and Evelyn de Rothschild reportedly were planning a marriage. In about 1964, she commissioned a new smaller villa, named La Califfa, to be built next to La Saracena. Its construction was finished in 1967; she sold La Saracena and moved to La Califfa.

By 1966, she was legally separated from her husband and awaiting a Church annulment. She made headlines in the society papers: notably, she attended Truman Capote's famous 1966 Black and White Ball and was photographed chatting with her sister-in-law Consuelo Crespi while wearing a 66-carat diamond she borrowed from Harry Winston as a headpiece, and she was named on the 1966 International Best-Dressed List. A Catholic Church court annulled their marriage in 1968.

=== Fashion, cosmetics, and jewelry ===
In 1966, Pignatelli launched her first collection as a clothes designer, with a showing in her Roman city residence.

Around this time, she also began working at Eve of Roma, a high-end cosmetics and beauty salon company owned by Gillette Company. When the company's founder and figurehead died, Luciana Pignatelli was hired for the role of international promotion. She later stepped aside to become their European fashion coordinator. It was at Eve of Roma that she met her second husband, Burt Simms Avedon, who was Eve of Roma's European manager.

From 1970 until at least 1977, she appeared on television ads as a spokesperson for Camay, both under the name Princess Pignatelli and as Luciana Avedon. In 1977, she was the spokesperson for a relaunch of The Perfumer's Workshop fragrance, Tea Rose, with "Princess Luciana" added to the label.

In the early 1970s until her death, she was also involved in jewelry design. In her last years, she worked as a designer based in London traveling twice yearly to the Bangkok workshops of Lotus Arts de Vivre to exhibit her creations and overseeing production of jewelry with semiprecious gems that were sold in India's luxury hotels.

=== Author ===
Pignatelli published three books from 1970 to 1976. All three were co-written with freelance fashion journalist Jeanne Molli. The titles for two of them have the phrase "The Beautiful People", which at the time was a popular term for socialites coined by Vogue editor Diana Vreeland.

In the book tour for her 1970 book, The Beautiful People's Beauty Book: How to Achieve the Look and Manner of the World's Most Attractive Women, she shared that she felt unattractive as a teenager. Her brother Rudi suggested she wear lipstick, then suggested rhinoplasty. Her parents allowed the surgery, and six months later she was married to her first husband. After that marriage ended, she turned to more procedures: eyelid lifts, silicone injections in her cheeks, diacutaneous fibrolysis, and also yoga, aromatherapy, and regular exercise. She suggested keeping the skin clean but also reported that she sometimes used beauty treatments "as an anti-depressant". The book shares her tips, and tips from other famous people of the day such as Ira von Fürstenberg and Talitha Getty.

Her 1973 book, The Beautiful People's Diet Book, continued the theme of sharing her own advice and that of other famous people. She was noted for maintaining a slim figure throughout her life. Her diet book had only one chapter about diet, and mostly promoted sensible meals without overeating. Like her beauty book, she shared tips from other famous people like Pauline de Rothschild, Cristina Ford, Fiona Campbell-Walter, Merle Oberon, and Françoise de Langlade.

In 1976, she published Luciana Avedon's Body Book. Fashion photographer Victor Skrebneski did the photography for this book. The book has many photos of her performing the exercises, in a bikini instead of the then-popular leotard and tights so the reader could see the actual results of the regular regimen. She promoted exercising 20 minutes each day.

== Personal life and death ==
Luciana and Prince Nicolò Pignatelli were married from 1954 to 1968, and had two children. She and Burt Avedon were married from 1970 until 1977.

In a 2003 interview, she mentioned in passing that she was taking antidepressants and that there had been a theft in which "everything was stolen". In October 2008, she consumed sleeping pills with gin and died. One magazine article reported that at some point she had mentioned to friends, "I can’t face being old and poor" but this was not substantiated in any other reporting.

== Works ==
- The Beautiful People's Beauty Book (1970)
- The Beautiful People's Diet Book (1973)
- Luciana Avedon's Body Book (1976)
