= Kotur (surname) =

Kotur is a surname. Notable people with the surname include:

- Alexandra Kotur, American author and fashion journalist
- Rade Kotur (born c. 1952), Bosnian Serb businessman and convicted criminal
- Vlado Kotur (born 1958), Bosnian footballer and coach
