= Valentina (fashion designer) =

Ukrainian artist (1899–1989)

- Valentina in 1947
- Born: Valentina Nicholaevna Sanina; 1 May 1899; Kiev, Russian Empire
- Died: 14 September 1989 (aged 90)
- Years active: 1928 – late 1950s
- Spouse: George Schlee (m. 1921; died 1964)

Valentina Nicholaevna Sanina Schlee (1 May 1899 (Note: For most of her life, Schlee maintained that she was born in 1899. Some sources state 1894 or 1904.) – 14 September 1989), simply known as Valentina, was a fashion designer and theatrical costume designer active from 1928 to the late 1950s.

== Early years ==
Schlee was born and raised in Kiev, Russian Empire (modern-day Ukraine). She was studying drama in Kharkiv at the outbreak of the October Revolution in 1917. She met her Russian financier husband, George Schlee (died 1964), at the Sevastopol railway station as she was fleeing the country with her family jewels; there is some question as to whether they were legally wed. George Schlee is best known for his 20-year friendship with film star Greta Garbo. The Schlees arrived in New York City in 1923 and became prominent members of café society during the Roaring Twenties. Valentina "stood out" for her clothes and style at the time because she appeared in floor-lengths and cover-ups while other women wore short skirts and low-neck dresses."

== Professional career ==
Schlee opened a small couture dress house, Valentina's Gowns on Madison Avenue in 1928. Her first stage commission was costumes for Judith Anderson in 1933's Come of Age. The costumes were better received than the play, and established her reputation as a designer for the stage. Schlee dressed such actresses of the era as Lynn Fontanne, Katharine Cornell, Greta Garbo, Gloria Swanson, Gertrude Lawrence, and Katharine Hepburn. Her Broadway successes included the costumes for the play The Philadelphia Story. She also dressed prominent New York society women including members of the Whitney and Vanderbilt families. In 1950 Valentina also introduced a perfume, "My Own".

Schlee's made-to-measure, flowing styles combined the intricate bias cut of Madeleine Vionnet and the grace of gowns by Alix Gres. "Simplicity survives the changes of fashion," she said in the late 1940s. "Women of chic are wearing now dresses they bought from me in 1936. Fit the century, forget the year."

Schlee was a self-promoter, and modeled her own designs. Schlee was known to be turned out, earning her a mention on the International Best Dressed List.

Schlee closed her fashion house in the late 1950s. She died of Parkinson's disease in 1989, aged 90. Since she and Garbo lived in the same apartment building in New York City—and Valentina was upset by Garbo's close friendship with her husband George in the early 60's right before he died—Valentina and Garbo had an elaborate schedule set up so that they would never run into each other in the lobby of their building.

In 2009, Valentina: American Couture and the Cult of Celebrity, a large retrospective exhibition opened at the Museum of the City of New York. It was the first exhibition to trace Valentina's career and featured never-before-exhibited gowns, accessories, photographs, and printed matter from the collections of the Museum of the City of New York, the Valentina family, and other major collections.
