= Amy Fine Collins =

American journalist, muse and author

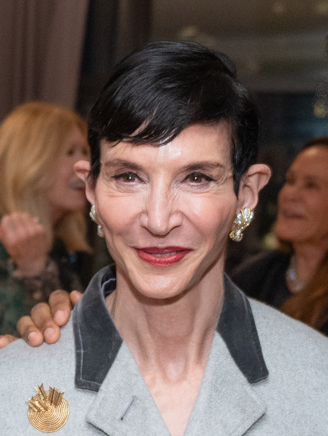
- Amy Fine Collins in 2024
- Born: Amy Fine; Fairfield, Connecticut, U.S.
- Education: Swarthmore College; Columbia University
- Occupations: Journalist, art historian, author
- Years active: 1984–present
- Spouse: Bradley Collins Jr
- Children: 1

Amy Fine Collins is an American journalist, muse, and author who has been a special correspondent for Vanity Fair since 1993, covering culture, style, and fashion. Starting in 2019 Amy began collaborating as an editor-at-large of Airmail magazine with Graydon Carter.

== Early life and education ==
Amy was born in Fairfield, Connecticut, as the daughter of Dr. Harold J. Fine and the art historian Elsa Honig Fine. She grew up between Bucks County, Pennsylvania and Knoxville, Tennessee with regular trips to family in New York.

She graduated from Swarthmore College and Columbia University with three degrees in Art History.

== Career ==
Amy taught at Columbia University for two years and at Parsons The New School for Design for one. Thereafter she became a Style Editor under Nancy Novogrod at House & Garden and Style Editor at Harper’s Bazaar under Liz Tilberis. In 1990 Amy started working at Vanity Fair, under Graydon Carter, as contributing editor. In 1993 she became Special Correspondent for the magazine. In 2003 she became one of the partners of the International Best Dressed List.

== Honors ==
In 1994 Amy was inducted into the International Best Dressed List, and in 1997 into its International Best Dressed Hall of Fame List.

She was awarded the Front Page Award by the Newswomen's Club of New York for her cultural criticism piece 'Toujours Couture' written for Vanity Fair. In 2011 she won the award again, for in-depth reporting, for her article 'Sex Trafficking in America: The Girls Next Door' written for Vanity Fair.

== Books ==
- American Impressionism, published in 1990 by Smithmark Publishers
- Hair Style, published in 1995
- The God of Driving, published in 2004
