= Camay =

British bar soap brand

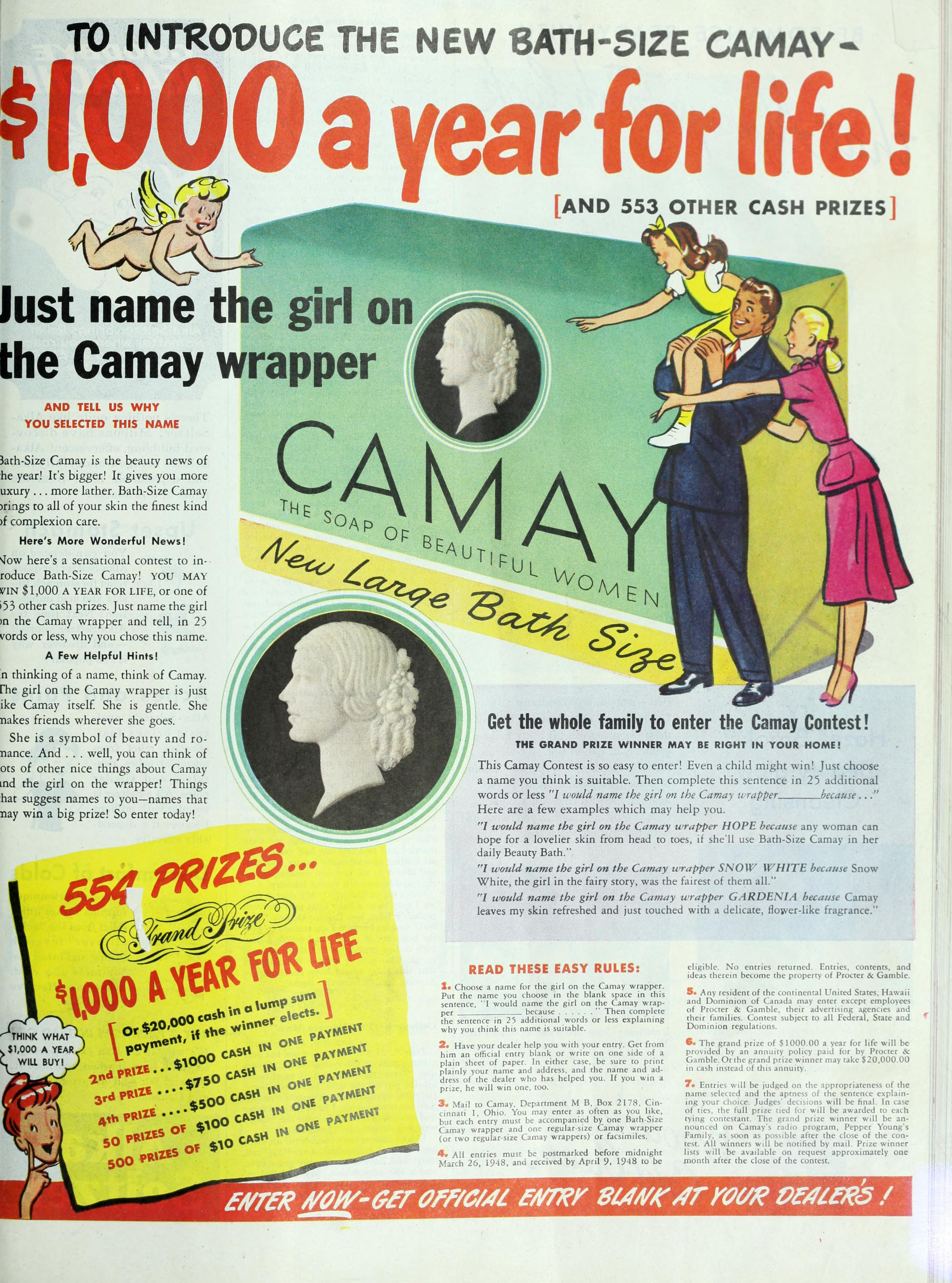
- 1948 ad for the product.
- Product type: bar soap
- Current owner: Unilever
- Country: United Kingdom
- Introduced: 1926; 100 years ago
- Markets: Worldwide
- Previous owners: Procter & Gamble

The logo of Camay used in 2006-2012.

Camay is a British brand of bar soap owned by Unilever. It was introduced in 1926 by Procter & Gamble and was marketed as a "white, pure soap for women," as many soaps of the time were colored to mask impurities. For many years, Camay's slogan has been "Camay: the soap for beautiful women." It was later replaced with "For your most beautiful complexion at every age."

In December 2014, Procter & Gamble announced it was selling Camay to Unilever. The transaction was completed in 2015, but Unilever had not yet announced when it would start producing Camay soap.

== Media sponsorship ==
For many years, Camay was a major sponsor of the soap operas As the World Turns and Search for Tomorrow.

Camay started gaining popularity in Eastern Europe, with 12 new scents introduced in 2004.

A Hungarian online campaign called The Code of Seduction (in Hungarian: A Csábitás Kódja) invites people to take a test that tells them which scent best suits their personality and mood.

== Spokesmodels ==
In the 1970s, its television spokesmodels included Princess Luciana Pignatelli, an Italian socialite, writer, and cosmetics executive, and Shelley Long. Other spokesmodels included Katie Boyle, Gail Barclay, Lynn Clayton, Julie Dawn Cole, Stacy Dorning, Claire Faulconbridge, Lynne Frederick, Sylvie Granotier, Nicola Pagett, Julie Peasgood and Natasha Pyne.
