= Alexandra Kotur =

Author, fashion journalist

- Born: New York City
- Education: Chapin School, Middlebury College
- Occupations: Author, fashion journalist

Alexandra Kotur is an American author and fashion journalist. The creative director at Town & Country magazine until 2012, she previously served as style director of U.S. Vogue. Kotur is an international taste-maker and member of the International Best-Dressed List.

== Early life and education ==
Alexandra Kotur was born to Sheila Camera Kotur, a British painter and illustrator for Condé Nast in the 1960s, and an American who worked in market research. She grew up on the Upper East Side of New York City, graduating from the Chapin School. Kotur attended Columbia University before transferring and graduating from Middlebury College with a degree in art history.

== Career ==
Upon graduation, Kotur moved to London, working in the PR department of Ralph Lauren and then at British GQ as an assistant to fashion director Jo Levin. Kotur returned to New York to work for Vogue, serving as an assistant to European editor Hamish Bowles. She eventually became the style director and a contributing editor at U.S. Vogue. Among her projects was the historical shoot of First Lady Michelle Obama in Narciso Rodriguez photographed by Annie Leibovitz at the Hay-Adams Hotel in Washington D.C. Kotur wrote Carolina Herrera: Portrait of a Fashion Icon (2004) and co-authored (with Bowles) The World in Vogue: People, Parties, Places (2009). Anna Wintour said of her in 2009:

“I trust her with all sorts of important sittings.... She’s very attuned to when moods in the social or popular culture are changing and how Vogue should address that. She’s almost like an old-school Vogue editor because she’s very much of the world of our reader, but she can set herself apart and judge it and come up with opinions. I don’t mean old-fashioned in any way, but she is a sweetly old-fashioned, correct Vogue editor. She’s very calm, she’s very meticulous, she’s very precise and she’s incapable of being anything but completely polite and completely correct in the way she deals with everyone. She embodies everything that we try and maintain at the magazine.”

Kotur was inducted as a member of the International Best-Dressed List by Vanity Fair in 2010. Of her own style, Kotur told the New York Observer:

“I think a closet full of things would actually stress me out. I just think this whole thing about not wearing anything twice, I just don’t understand it. I think things should be worn. You should bond with your clothing. It should be yours. If you’re in this industry and you’re looking at clothes all day, I sort of just want to stay neutral.”

== List of works ==
- Caroline Herrera: Portrait of a Fashion Icon (2004)
- The World in Vogue: People, Parties, Places (2009)

== Personal life ==
Kotur is married to fashion photographer Jonathan Becker; they have two children. She is the sister of Fiona Kotur Marin, an American accessories designer.
