= Cristina Ford =

Italian socialite (1929 – 2008)

- Born: Maria Cristina Vettore; 24 June 1929; Vicenza, Italy
- Died: 25 December 2008 (aged 79); Rome, Italy
- Known for: Marriage to Henry Ford II
- Spouses: Robin Willoughby Merivale Austin (m. 1946; div. 1955); Henry Ford II (m. 1965; div. 1976)

Maria Cristina Ford (née Vettore; formerly Austin; 24 June 1929 – 25 December 2008) was an Italian socialite and the second wife of Henry Ford II, the chief executive officer of the Ford Motor Company.

== Biography ==
Maria Cristina Vettore was born on 24 June 1929, in Grancona near Vicenza, Italy, and educated in Milan. Her father was Edoardo Vettore of Milan, who died when she was a child. Her mother was Lavina Ferron.

=== First marriage ===
Cristina first married Robin Willoughby Merivale Austin (married on 20 August 1946), a Canadian from Montreal serving in the British Royal Navy. They divorced in Quebec, Canada in 1955.

=== Second marriage ===
Cristina met Henry Ford II in 1960 during a party at Maxim's in Paris. She became Ford's second wife on 19 February 1965. While married to Henry Ford II, she was described by LIFE magazine as a "highly effective ambassadress for the Ford Motor Company". In 1969, the Women's Wear Daily called her "the complete Italian". In 1973, Cristina Ford was listed on the International Hall of Fame of the International Best Dressed List. In 1975, Henry Ford II reportedly had an affair with model Kathy DuRoss, who would later become his third wife. In 1976, after eleven years of marriage, Henry Ford II and Cristina Ford ended the marriage, with Cristina receiving US$16 million (equivalent to $90,526,316 in 2025). In 1988, Cristina Ford filed a suit against Henry Ford II's estate seeking an expanded alimony claim worth an additional US$5 million.

=== Friendships ===
She was a friend of former Philippine First Lady Imelda Marcos, the wife of former Philippine President Ferdinand Marcos. In an interview with Walter Hayes, UK public relations executive for Ford, he related how Henry accused the two women of being lovers, a charge which Cristina indignantly denied. The two women, as documented in a Filipino newsreel of Imelda Marcos' official visit to Iran to represent President Marcos at the 2500th Persian monarchy celebrations in October 1971, shared her assigned royal encampment tent (for which Mrs Marcos received personal permission from Queen Farah Pahlavi to do so) so that Mrs Ford could stay with her during the event rather than at a hotel in the city of Shiraz.

=== Death ===
Cristina Ford died in Rome on Christmas Day 2008.

== See also ==
- Henry Ford II
