= Consuelo Crespi =

American-born Italian countess

Consuelo Pauline O'Brien (O'Connor) Crespi (May 31, 1928 – October 18, 2010) was an American-born Italian countess who was a model and editor of Vogue (magazine) and Vogue Italia. During the same period, her twin sister Gloria Schiff was editor of the American edition of Vogue magazine. She was also a member of the International Best Dressed List since 1959.

== Biography ==
Crespi was born on May 31, 1928, in Larchmont, New York, along with her twin sister Gloria. She grew up in Nova Scotia and was spotted as a potential model when she moved back to New York City with her mother and sister, appearing on the cover of Look magazine in 1945. She was introduced to society as a débutante in 1947 and met Count Rodolfo (Rudi) Crespi (São Paulo, 1924 – New York, 1985), grandson of wealthy industrialist Count Rodolfo Crespi (1874–1939) and Countess Marina Crespi (née Regoli, 1879–1964), on a blind date in a New York City restaurant. They were married three months later, on January 22, 1948, in a ceremony held at Church of St. Ignatius Loyola on the Upper East Side of Manhattan. The couple had two children, Brando Crespi and Pilar Crespi.

== An ambassador of Italian fashion ==
Through her choices in attire and in publishing, Crespi played a major role in influencing the fashion world and giving a boost to the careers of designers such as Fendi and Missoni. Valentino credited Crespi with giving him a break into the fashion industry and it was a Valentino dress worn by her twin sister that convinced Jacqueline Kennedy to try out the designer. In addition to her role as editor of Italian Vogue, Crespi's appearances at social events such as the Black and White Ball thrown by Truman Capote in 1966 were widely reported. In a best-dressed list published in 1958 by the New York Dress Institute, Crespi was ranked third, behind the Duchess of Windsor, but ahead of Queen Elizabeth II in fourth place and Audrey Hepburn in fifth. She was included on the International Best Dressed List and was recognized by the Fashion Hall of Fame for her "faultless taste in dress without ostentation or extravagance".

In addition to her editing duties, Crespi and her husband both did public relations for major designers. Her husband had been involved on the editorial staff of Vogue Brasil and Vogue Mexico. After returning from Rome in 1961, she received notice from the fashion world by wearing skirts that were four to five inches longer than the prevailing fashion, helping to promote a new line from the designer Fabiani, saying "I now can't stand the sight of my knees showing" after donning the longer skirts. The government of Italy bestowed its highest-ranked civilian award to Crespi for her assistance in promoting the fashion industry in that country.

Crespi lamented the decline in Italian social life among the wealthy and aristocratic crowd in the 1970s in the wake of social unrest and a wave of kidnappings, telling Time magazine that "In Italy now you want to feel rich and look poor".

== Legacy ==
Crespi died at age 82 on October 18, 2010, at Mount Sinai Hospital in Manhattan due to a stroke. She was survived by a daughter, a son, four grandchildren and two great-grandchildren. Her husband had died in 1985. Her daughter Pilar Crespi was an assistant editor at Vogue and has spent most of her career in the fashion industry, and her granddaughter Chloe is a fashion photographer.
