= Robert L. Green =

Robert L. Green (c. 1922 – July 1997) was the fashion director for Playboy magazine from the 1950s through the 1970s. He was made Vanity Fair's best-dressed man of the year for 1972. He died in July 1997, aged 79.
