= Kim d'Estainville =

French aristocrat and socialite

Kim d'Estainville (died 1990) was a French aristocrat and socialite known for his connections to prominent figures in Parisian high society during the 1970s and 1980s. He died of AIDS in December 1990.
