= Adrienne Vittadini =

American fashion designer (born 1943)

- Born: October 9, 1943 (age 81); Győr, Kingdom of Hungary
- Occupation: Fashion designer
- Website: adriennevittadini.com

Adrienne Vittadini (born October 9, 1943, in Győr, Hungary) is an American fashion designer.

== Biography ==
When she was 13, her family fled Győr during the 1956 Hungarian revolution. In 1979, she got into fashion design as a hobby, which later turned into a multimillion-dollar business. Her designs feature an assortment of vibrant colors and prints, encompassing clothing, handbags, swimsuits, shoes, eyewear, and perfumes. Subsequently, her company was acquired by Retail Brand Alliance in 2001.

She has appeared in an advertisement for Rolex, wearing the Rolex Explorer II.

She now lives seasonally in Sarasota, Florida, where she went into the home fashion and house design business.

In April 2017, some Ivanka Trump clothing items were mistakenly labeled as Adrienne Vittadini items before being sold to Stein Mart. G-III Apparel Group, the company that licenses Ivanka Trump brand clothing, then took responsibility for mislabeling the clothing, and said they were taking steps to remove mislabeled items from stores.
