= Cutty Sark Men's Fashion Awards =

New York City awards (1979–1989)

The Cutty Sark Men's Fashion Awards were awards given for men's fashion design from 1979 to 1989 at the Fashion Institute of Technology in New York City.

Each year, a rotating committee of around 50 members of the fashion press met to determine three nominees in each category and was then voted by the nation's fashion press. The award itself was a sterling silver trophy in the shape of a clipper ship, the emblem of the Scotch whisky marketed by Cutty Sark.

== See also ==
- List of fashion awards
