= Françoise de Langlade =

French magazine editor (1921–1983)

- De Langlade in 1974
- Born: Françoise de Langlade; November 30, 1920 or December 24, 1920; Paris, France
- Died: June 17, 1983 (aged 62); New York City, US
- Occupation: Fashion magazine editor
- Known for: Editor-in-chief of Vogue Paris
- Spouses: Jean Bruère (m. 1940, divorced); Nicholas Bagenow (m. 1947, divorced); Oscar de la Renta (m. 1967)
- Children: 1

Françoise de Langlade (1921 – June 17, 1983) was a French magazine editor with Condé Nast Publications, and the first wife of fashion designer Oscar de la Renta. She was named to the International Best Dressed List Hall of Fame in 1973.

== Early life and education ==
De Langlade was born in Paris in 1921, the daughter of an insurance salesman from Bordeaux. She was educated in Paris.

== Career ==
De Langlade started her career in fashion with the House of Schiaparelli, which she left to work at Harper's Bazaar. She joined French Vogue in 1951, where she served as fashion editor and editor-in-chief. In 1967, she married Oscar de la Renta and moved to the United States. In 1968, she joined American Vogue where she served as editor-at-large. She also worked as a fashion and beauty editor for Elizabeth Arden International. She is credited with using her established network of contacts to help promote her husband's brand.

== Personal life and death ==
De Langlade married three times. Her first husband was French businessman Jean Bruère, with whom she had one son, Jean-Marc; the marriage ended in divorce. Her second husband, from whom she also divorced, was diplomat Nicholas Bagenow, son of Leïla Hagondokoff. In 1967, she married Oscar de la Renta. The de la Rentas had homes in Manhattan; Kent, Connecticut; and Santo Domingo.

De Langlade died of bone cancer in 1983.

Media offices
Preceded by Edmonde Charles-Roux	Editor-in-chief of Vogue Paris; 1966–1968	Succeeded by Francine Crescent
