= Gloria Schiff =

American socialite and magazine editor (1928–2019)

Gloria Schiff (31 May 1928 - 2 May 2019) was an American socialite and the editor of Vogue magazine.

Her twin sister was Consuelo Crespi.
