= Hamish Bowles =

British fashion journalist

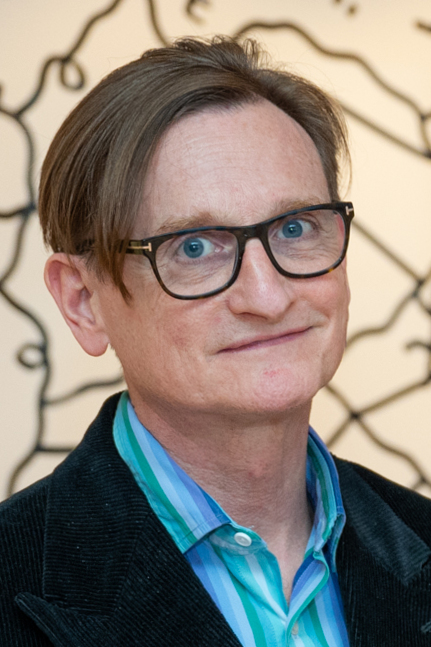
- Bowles in 2024
- Born: Hamish Bowles; 23 July 1963 (age 63); London, England
- Education: Saint Martin's School of Art
- Occupations: Fashion and design journalist
- Years active: 1984–present

Hamish Bowles (born 23 July 1963) is an English fashion journalist and editor. He is Vogue magazine's global editor at large. On 17 September 2021, Bowles was also named the new editor in chief at The World of Interiors, a Condé Nast interior design magazine. In addition to his editorial roles, Bowles has hosted the podcasts In Vogue: The 1990s and In Vogue: The 2000s. He also narrates Vogue's YouTube series Everything You Need to Know.

== Background ==
Hamish Bowles was born in London in 1963, the son of David Victor Bowles, vice-provost of University College London, and his wife Anne, a photographer. He studied at Saint Martin's School of Art.

== Career ==
From 1984 until 1992, he worked for Harper's Bazaar UK, first as a fashion editor, then as fashion director and, from 1989, as style director. In 1992, Bowles joined the staff of the American edition of Vogue.

In 1998 he had a cameo part in Love Is the Devil: Study for a Portrait of Francis Bacon as a young David Hockney. In 2006 he appeared for some seconds in Sofia Coppola's Marie Antoinette as a courtier. He appeared in 2009 in Valentino: The Last Emperor and in 2010 in Gossip Girl and in Wall Street: Money Never Sleeps.

Bowles has a large personal collection of designer clothing, including pieces by John Galliano, Mainbocher and Charles Frederick Worth. He has lent items from his collection to exhibitions at the Metropolitan Museum of Art. He was a creative consultant for an exhibition at the Met of fashion worn by Jacqueline Kennedy Onassis during her White House years. A book he edited was published to coincide with the exhibition.

At Vogue, Bowles appeared in a video series titled "Vintage Bowles" where cameras followed him as he shopped for clothes around the world.

In 2022, Bowles co-hosted the Met Gala alongside Vanessa Hudgens and Blake Lively.

In October 2022, then aged 59, Bowles suffered an acute ischemic stroke while inspecting a home renovation, with catastrophic deficits in the areas of locomotion, speech, memory, and motor reflexes. "...Blood flow to my brain was blocked," he writes in his narrative of recovery, published in British Vogue. "I couldn’t speak, nor move the right side of my body....It would be another 50 days before I regained the ability to drink or eat without intubation, and another 145 days before I would see a bed outside of the hospital."

In September 2021, Bowles became editor-in-chief of The World of Interiors. The magazine has only had three editors during its 41-year history. However, in 2024, Bowles became creative director-at-large and the magazine's editor Emily Tobin took on the editor-in-chief position.
