= The Big Four (Vogue) =

Four most notable Vogue editions

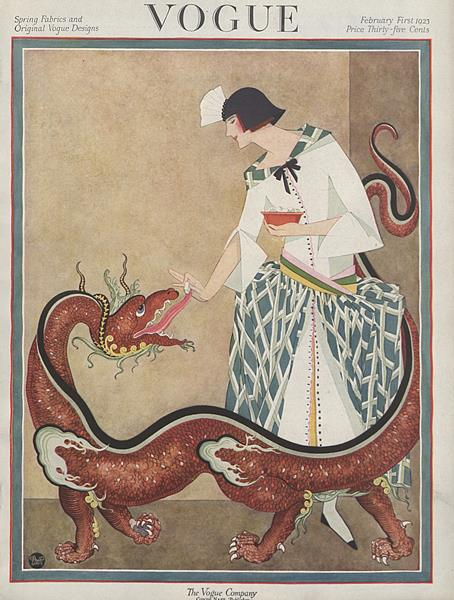
US Vogue cover from 1 February 1923

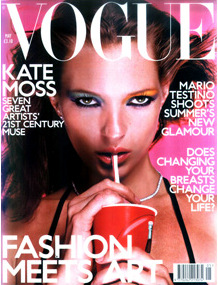
British Vogue cover from May 2000

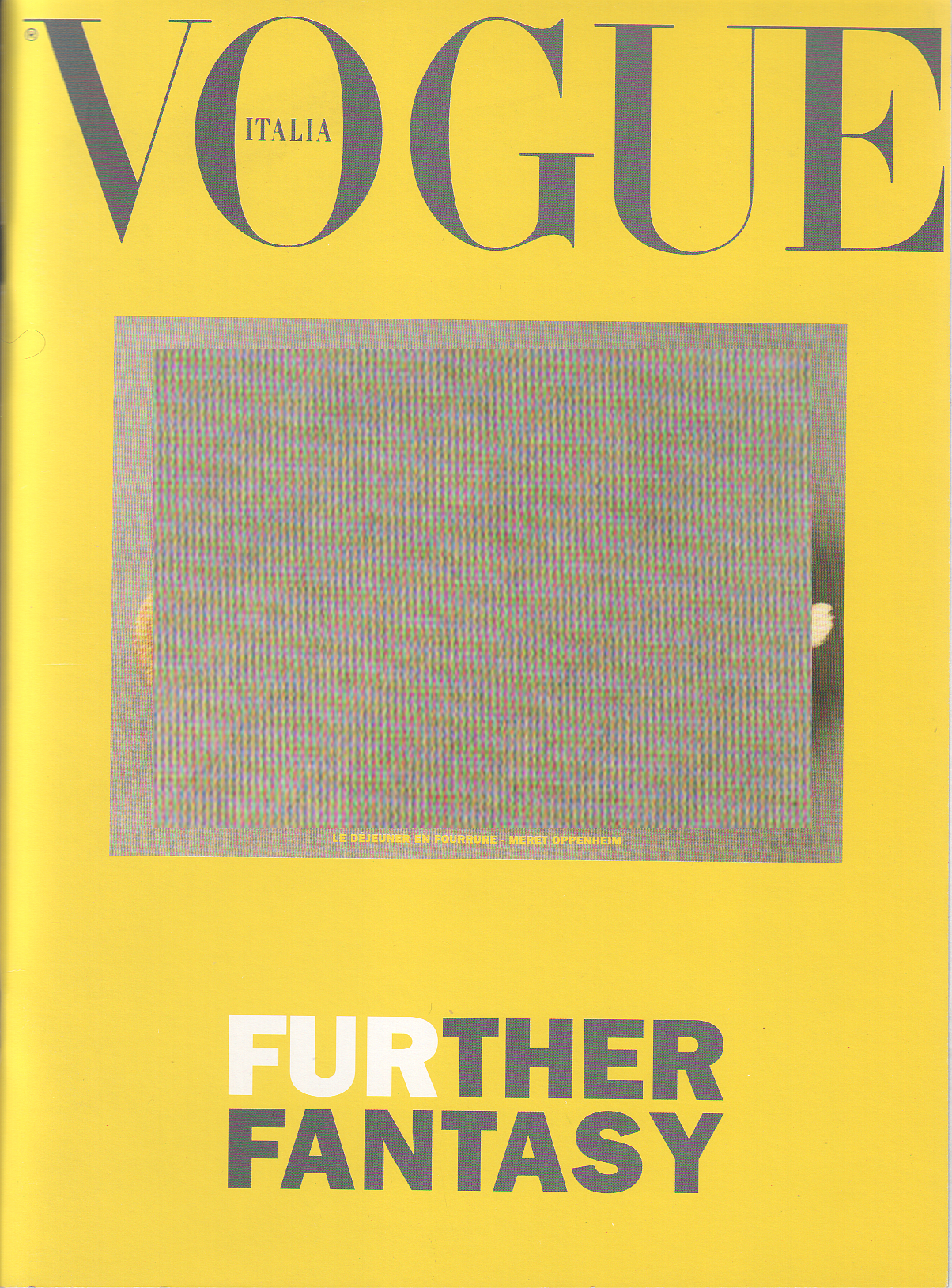
Vogue Italia supplement cover from March 1999

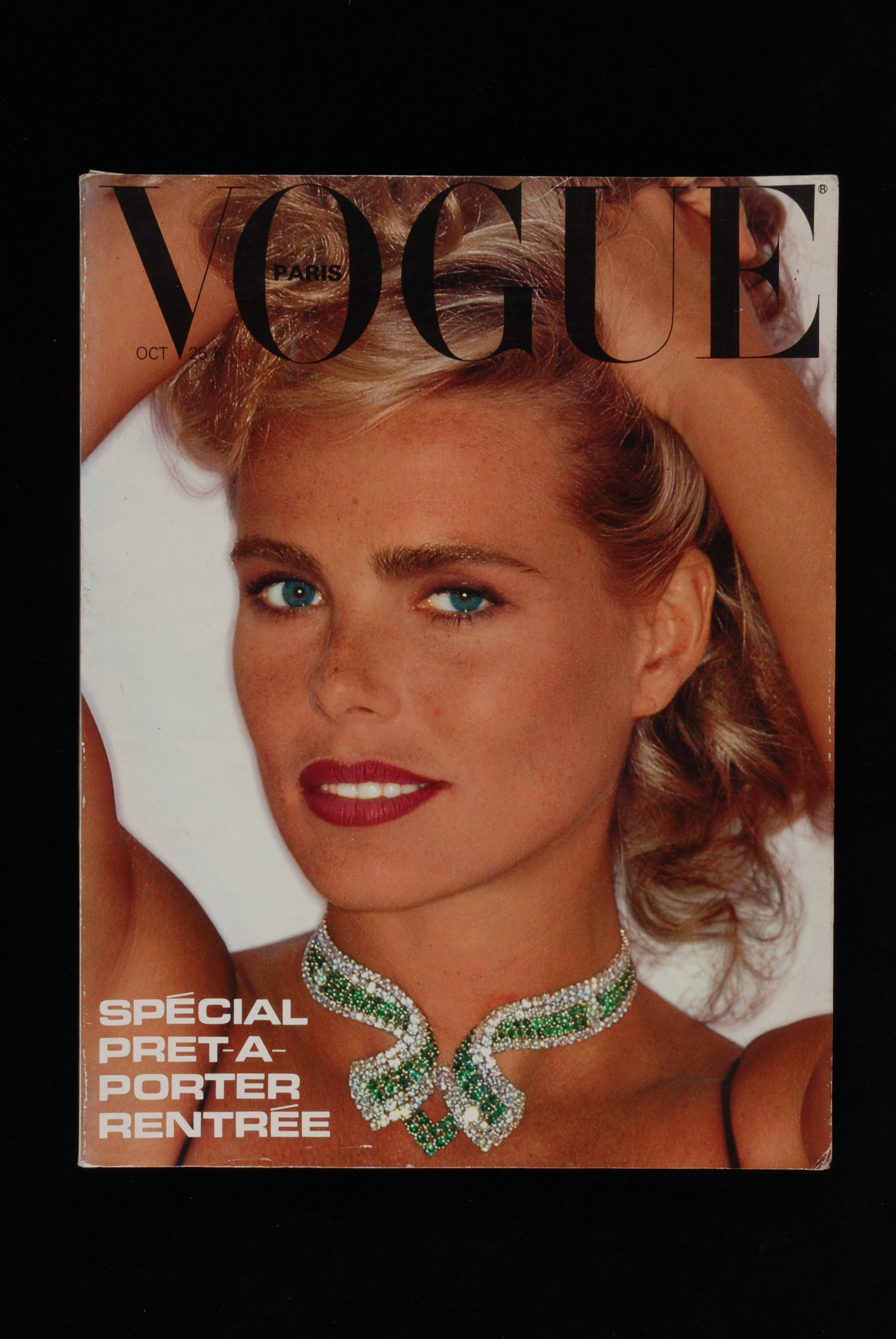
Vogue Paris cover from October 1980

The Big Four, is the name given to the four most notable editions of fashion magazine Vogue. These editions (American Vogue, British Vogue, Vogue France, and Vogue Italia) are considered to be some of the most important magazines to the fashion industry.

The term is most commonly associated with fashion models being featured on the cover of all four editions. A model being featured on the cover of all four editions is considered one of the most significant achievements in the modelling industry. If a non-model is featured on the cover of all four editions it is considered a significant achievement in the fashion industry due to the notability needed in the fashion industry to be on the cover of all four editions.

The Big Four are considered to be notable due to their coverage of the four fashion capitals (New York City, London, Paris, and Milan). An editor-in-chief of a big four Vogue (as of 2026, Chloe Malle, Chioma Nnadi, Claire Thomson-Jonville, and Francesca Ragazzi) is automatically considered to be an important fashion tastemaker.

== Records ==
=== Most Big Four covers ===
The model who is featured on the most Big Four Vogue covers as of 2025 is Kate Moss, Moss has been featured on 78 covers. Gisele Bündchen holds the record for the most Vogue covers (139 as of 2025), however Bündchen has only been featured on 48 big four covers.

=== Youngest models ===
The youngest models to complete the Big Four are Karolína Kurková and Gemma Ward, they both completed the Big Four at 17 years and 5 months old. Followed by Renée Simonsen (at 17 years and 11 months old), Twiggy (at 18 years and 1 month old), and Kaia Gerber (at 18 years and 7 months old).

=== Non-Models ===
In 1993, Madonna became the first non-model and musician to be featured on the big four, followed by Rihanna in 2021, and Dua Lipa in 2026.

== List of record holders and timeline of achievement ==
List of "Big Four" record holders and timeline of their achievement by date of completion:

=== 1960s ===
Model	First Issue	Second Issue	Third Issue	Fourth Issue	Notes	Ref.
Wilhelmina Cooper	British Vogue, 1 February 1961	US Vogue, 15 January 1962	Vogue Paris, September 1962	Vogue Italia, October 1964	First model to complete the Big Four	
Deborah Dixon	US Vogue, 15 November 1960	British Vogue, December 1961	Vogue Paris, May 1965	Vogue Italia, June 1965		
Jean Shrimpton	British Vogue, June 1962	US Vogue, 1 April 1963	Vogue Paris, April 1963	Vogue Italia, January 1967		
Twiggy	US Vogue, April 1967	Vogue Italia, May 1967	Vogue Paris, May 1967	British Vogue, October 1967		
Veruschka	US Vogue, October 1964	Vogue Italia, July/August 1965	British Vogue, February 1966	Vogue Paris, August 1968		
Marisa Berenson	US Vogue, September 1965	Vogue Paris, April 1966	Vogue Italia, June 1967	British Vogue, September 1968		

=== 1970s ===
Model	First Issue	Second Issue	Third Issue	Fourth Issue	Notes	Ref.
Donna Mitchell	Vogue Paris, October 1966	British Vogue, October 1966	US Vogue, August 1971	Vogue Italia, May 1972		
Margaux Hemingway	US Vogue, March 1975	British Vogue, September 1975	Vogue Paris, October 1976	Vogue Italia, November 1976		

=== 1980s ===
Model	First Issue	Second Issue	Third Issue	Fourth Issue	Notes	Ref.
Carol Alt	British Vogue, March 1980	Vogue Italia, November 1980	US Vogue, March 1981	Vogue Paris, May 1981		
Gia Carangi	British Vogue, April 1979	Vogue Paris, April 1979	US Vogue, August 1980	Vogue Italia, February 1981		
Eva Voorhees	British Vogue, August 1979	US Vogue, April 1980	Vogue Paris, March 1981	Vogue Italia, October 1981		
Kim Alexis	British Vogue, December 1978	US Vogue, August 1979	Vogue Paris, November 1980	Vogue Italia, January 1982		
Renée Simonsen	Vogue Italia, November 1982	British Vogue, February 1983	Vogue Paris, February 1983	US Vogue, April 1983		
Rosemary McGrotha	Vogue Italia, April 1981	US Vogue, January 1982	Vogue Paris, September 1982	British Vogue, August 1983		
Jacki Adams	Vogue Paris, February 1982	Vogue Italia, April 1982	British Vogue, May 1982	US Vogue, January 1984		
Isabella Rossellini	US Vogue, March 1982	Vogue Paris, April 1982	Vogue Italia, February 1984	British Vogue, July 1984		
Estelle Lefébure	Vogue Paris, April 1986	US Vogue, July 1986	Vogue Italia, July/August 1986	British Vogue, May 1987		
Linda Evangelista	Vogue Paris, September 1987	US Vogue, December 1988	British Vogue, January 1989	Vogue Italia, February 1989		
Cindy Crawford	US Vogue, August 1986	British Vogue, January 1987	Vogue Paris, February 1987	Vogue Italia, 15 February 1989		
Tatjana Patitz	British Vogue, October 1985	Vogue Italia, April 1986	US Vogue, May 1987	Vogue Paris, June/July 1989		
Naomi Campbell	British Vogue, December 1987	Vogue Italia, June 1988	Vogue Paris, August 1988	US Vogue, September 1989	First black model to complete the Big Four	

=== 1990s ===
Model	First Issue	Second Issue	Third Issue	Fourth Issue	Notes	Ref.
Christy Turlington	Vogue Italia, March 1986	British Vogue, July 1986	Vogue Paris, November 1986	US Vogue, April 1990		
Claudia Schiffer	British Vogue, October 1989	Vogue Italia, March 1990	US Vogue, August 1990	Vogue Paris, May 1992		
Madonna	British Vogue, February 1989	US Vogue, May 1989	Vogue Italia, February 1991	Vogue Paris, October 1993	First celebrity to complete the Big Four	
Nadja Auermann	British Vogue, January 1992	Vogue Paris, June/July 1992	Vogue Italia, July 1992	US Vogue, November 1993		
Meghan Douglas	Vogue Italia, November 1991	US Vogue, January 1993	British Vogue, October 1993	Vogue Paris, February 1995		
Stephanie Seymour	Vogue Italia, June 1987	US Vogue, March 1988	British Vogue, December 1988	Vogue Paris, May 1995		
Kate Moss	British Vogue, March 1993	Vogue Paris, March 1994	Vogue Italia, October 1994	US Vogue, July 1995		
Shalom Harlow	US Vogue, January 1993	Vogue Italia, May 1993	British Vogue, April 1995	Vogue Paris, March 1996		
Amber Valletta	US Vogue, February 1993	Vogue Italia, May 1993	British Vogue, December 1994	Vogue Paris, September 1996		
Carolyn Murphy	Vogue Paris, February 1996	Vogue Italia, October 1996	US Vogue, April 1997	British Vogue, May 1998		
Gisele Bündchen	British Vogue, August 1998	Vogue Italia, June 1999	US Vogue, July 1999	Vogue Paris, August 1999		
Angela Lindvall	Vogue Italia, June 1997	US Vogue, February 1998	British Vogue, September 1998	Vogue Paris, November 1999		

=== 2000s ===
Model	First Issue	Second Issue	Third Issue	Fourth Issue	Notes	Ref.
Bridget Hall	Vogue Italia, June 1993	US Vogue, April 1994	British Vogue, September 1998	Vogue Paris, November 2000		
Frankie Rayder	Vogue Italia, January 1999	Vogue Paris, April 1999	British Vogue, July 1999	US Vogue, November 2000		
Karolína Kurková	US Vogue, February 2001	Vogue Paris, March 2001	British Vogue, May 2001	Vogue Italia, July 2001	Shortest time (6 months) to complete the Big Four	
Carmen Kass	Vogue Paris, November 1997	US Vogue, May 1999	British Vogue, January 2001	Vogue Italia, January 2002		
Karen Elson	Vogue Italia, February 1997	Vogue Paris, December 1997/January 1998	British Vogue, January 2002	US Vogue, September 2004		
Natalia Vodianova	Vogue Italia, December 2002	Vogue Paris, March 2003	British Vogue, September 2003	US Vogue, September 2004		
Daria Werbowy	Vogue Italia, July 2003	US Vogue, September 2004	British Vogue, January 2005	Vogue Paris, March 2005		
Gemma Ward	British Vogue, April 2004	US Vogue, September 2004	Vogue Paris, February 2005	Vogue Italia, April 2005		
Jessica Stam	Vogue Italia, September 2003	British Vogue, August 2006	Vogue Paris, November 2006	US Vogue, May 2007		
Sasha Pivovarova	Vogue Italia, December 2005	Vogue Paris, September 2006	US Vogue, May 2007	British Vogue, September 2007		

=== 2010s ===
Model	First Issue	Second Issue	Third Issue	Fourth Issue	Notes	Ref.
Lara Stone	Vogue Paris, April 2007	Vogue Italia, December 2007	US Vogue, May 2009	British Vogue, December 2009		
Arizona Muse	Vogue Italia, January 2011	Vogue Paris, November 2011	British Vogue, February 2012	US Vogue, September 2014		
Edie Campbell	British Vogue, April 2013	Vogue Italia, April 2013	US Vogue, September 2014	Vogue Paris, February 2016		
Gigi Hadid	Vogue Italia, November 2015	British Vogue, January 2016	Vogue Paris, March 2016	US Vogue, August 2016		
Helena Christensen	British Vogue, March 1990	Vogue Paris, November 1992	US Vogue, January 1993	Vogue Italia, October 2016	Longest time to complete the big four (26 years)	
Vittoria Ceretti	Vogue Italia, July 2016	US Vogue, March 2017	Vogue Paris, May 2017	British Vogue, May 2018		

=== 2020s ===
Model	First Issue	Second Issue	Third Issue	Fourth Issue	Notes	Ref.
Adut Akech	Vogue Italia, April 2018	British Vogue, May 2018	Vogue Paris, April 2019	US Vogue, April 2020		
Kaia Gerber	Vogue Paris, April 2016	Vogue Italia, July 2018	British Vogue, October 2019	US Vogue, April 2020		
Rihanna	US Vogue, April 2011	British Vogue, November 2011	Vogue Paris, December 2017/January 2018	Vogue Italia, June 2021	Second celebrity to complete the Big Four	
Imaan Hammam	US Vogue, September 2014	Vogue Italia, April 2016	British Vogue, February 2017	Vogue Paris, June/July 2021		
Bella Hadid	Vogue Italia, September 2016	Vogue Paris, September 2016	British Vogue, March 2018	US Vogue, September 2021		
Jill Kortleve	Vogue Paris, February 2020	US Vogue, April 2020	Vogue Italia, May 2021	British Vogue, April 2023		
Anok Yai	Vogue Italia, May 2019	US Vogue, April 2020	British Vogue, February 2022	Vogue France, October 2024		
Joan Smalls	Vogue Italia, March 2012	US Vogue, September 2014	British Vogue, September 2020	Vogue France, May 2025		
Dua Lipa	British Vogue, January 2019	US Vogue, June/July 2022	Vogue France, September 2023	Vogue Italia, September 2026	Third celebrity to complete the Big Four	
Cara Delevingne	British Vogue, March 2013	US Vogue, September 2014	Vogue Paris, October 2017	Vogue Italia, December 2026		
