= Vogue India =

Indian fashion magazine

- One of October 2017 covers highlighting Vogue India's tenth anniversary
- Head of Editorial Content: Rochelle Pinto (2023-present)
- Former editors: Megha Kapoor (2021–2023); Priya Tanna (2007–2021)
- Categories: Fashion
- Frequency: Bi-Monthly
- Publisher: S. Gurdeep Singh Jujhar
- First issue: October 2007
- Company: Condé Nast India Pvt. Ltd.(Jujhar Group)
- Country: India
- Language: English
- Website: www.vogue.in
- ISSN: 0973-9645
- OCLC: 456294149

Vogue India is the Indian edition of the monthly fashion and lifestyle magazine Vogue. It is the 17th international edition of Vogue and the first edition in South Asia. Vogue India is published by Condé Nast India Pvt. Ltd., a 100% owned subsidiary of Condé Nast International. Vogue India was the first magazine released in India that is 100% foreign owned. Condé Nast India has two branch offices. One in Mumbai and the other office in New Delhi.

== History ==
The magazine was founded in 2007 and began with a circulation of 50,000 print issues. The first editor of Vogue India, Priya Tanna, stated that this iteration of Vogue targets the modern Indian woman, celebrating India's "colorful people" and culture. The first issue of Vogue India was the October 2007 issue, which was released on 20 September 2007. The cover was shot by photographer Patrick Demarchelier, and featured Bipasha Basu, Gemma Ward and Priyanka Chopra on the regular cover, and Monikangana Dutta, Preity Zinta, and Lakshmi Menon on the gatefold cover. Ward's appearance on the cover was criticized by some readers who felt that the inaugural edition's cover should have exclusively featured Indian women. Alex Kuruvilla, managing director of Condé Nast India, described Vogue India as being "nosier and more colourful and more vibrant than the western models".

Priya Tanna was the editor-in-chief of Vogue India from 2007 to 2021. The editorial team of Vogue India, and all other Asia-Pacific editions, originally reported to Vogue Taiwan editor Leslie Sun, who in turn reported to global editorial director Anna Wintour. In 2021, Condé Nast announced a global restructuring of its operations to reduce costs. Under the new organization, the Vogue India editorial team reports directly to Anna Wintour who is also the chief content officer of Condé Nast. The restructuring led to the exit of several Vogue editors including Tanna. Condé Nast appointed Megha Kapoor as Head of Editorial Content of Vogue India on 3 September 2021. In an interview with The Sydney Morning Herald, Kapoor emphasized her desire to "foster the diverse, rich and talented wealth of talent emerging from India" in this new role. Before taking on this position, Kapoor founded INPRINT and formerly worked as a junior fashion writer for Vogue India and on the fashion team of Vogue Australia. Current Head Of Editorial Content is Rochelle Pinto appointed Oct 2023.

== Cover models ==
=== Notable covers ===
Celebrating the publication's seventh anniversary, the October 2014 issue highlighted Vogue India's #VogueEmpower initiative. Through over 150 celebrity endorsements, interviews with activists like Gloria Steinem, and collaborations with major fashion houses, Vogue India spoke to the ongoing fight for women's equality within India and throughout the world. The May 2017 Issue, featuring Kendall Jenner, came under controversy for featuring a non-Indian on the cover for the first of Vogue India's series of special issues celebrating their tenth anniversary. However, in a statement on Instagram, the brand defended their choice of Jenner, stating that "as an international brand ...we want to give the love back by featuring some of the best international celebrities on our covers. Occasionally!" In the June 2019 magazine issue, Kareena Kapoor, Karan Johar, Diljit Dosanjh and Natasha Poonawalla were seen together having a photoshoot for Vogue India's magazine and the magazine issue was named 'Forces of Fashion'. On the cover page, Kareena Kapoor and Karan Johar are flaunting their animal print dress and a printed jacket, while Diljit Dosanjh and Natasha Poonawala are wearing purple and yellow outfits. In the March/April 2023 issue, British supermodel Naomi Campbell appeared on the cover of Vogue India for the first time. On the cover, Campbell wears a crown, earrings, and necklace from Calcutta-based, Indian jewelry brand Sabyasachi. The title for the issue reads "Iconic Naomi" in the English language.
