= Turnure =

Turnure is a surname. Notable people with the surname include:

- Arthur Baldwin Turnure (1856–1906), American businessman
- Pamela Turnure (1937–2023), American press secretary
- Tom Turnure (born 1957), American football player
