= Mirabella =

Former women's magazine (1989–2000)

- Mirabella cover, 1997
- Editor-in-chief: Roberta Myers (1997–2000)
- Former editors: Amy Gross (1989–1993, 1995–1997), Gay Bryant (1993–1995)
- Categories: Women's magazine
- Frequency: Monthly (1989–1995), Bimonthly (1995–2000)
- Publisher: Susan Blank (1999–2000)
- Founder: Grace Mirabella
- Founded: 1989
- First issue: June 1989
- Final issue: April 2000
- Company: Hachette Filipacchi
- Country: United States
- Based in: New York City
- Language: English
- ISSN: 1044-5153

Mirabella was a women's magazine published from June 1989 to April 2000. It was created by and named for Grace Mirabella, a former Vogue editor in chief, in partnership with Rupert Murdoch.

It was originally published by News Corporation, and it became the property of Hachette Filipacchi in 1995. Known as a smart women's magazine, it suffered in comparison to Elle, a more lighthearted issue from the same publisher. Declining ad revenue contributed to a reported $9 million loss in 1999, and the magazine folded immediately after the debut of Oprah Winfrey's magazine O in April 2000.

Mirabella's circulation stood at 558,009 at the time of its demise.

== Editors ==
- Amy Gross (1989–1993, 1995–1997)
- Gay Bryant (1993–1995)
- Dominique Browning (1995)
- Roberta Myers (1997–2000)

== Editions ==
- Mirabella (United States, 1989–2000)
- Mirabella (United Kingdom, 1990–?)
