= Grace Mirabella =

American fashion journalist (1929–2021)

- Mirabella in 1986
- Born: Marie Grace Mirabella; June 10, 1929; Newark, New Jersey, U.S.
- Died: December 23, 2021 (aged 92); New York City, U.S.
- Education: Columbia High School
- Alma mater: Skidmore College
- Occupation: Editor
- Title: Editor-in-chief of Vogue magazine
- Term: 1971–1988
- Predecessor: Diana Vreeland
- Successor: Anna Wintour
- Spouse: William G. Cahan (m. 1974)

Marie Grace Mirabella (June 10, 1929 – December 23, 2021) was an American fashion journalist who was editor-in-chief of Vogue magazine between 1971 and 1988. She founded Mirabella magazine in 1989, and continued there until 1996.

== Early life ==
Marie Grace Mirabella was born on June 10, 1929, in Newark, New Jersey, to parents of Italian descent. An only child, she moved to Maplewood, New Jersey, which she saw as a sign that "things were getting better economically" for her family, and graduated from Columbia High School. Her father, an importer of wine and liquor, died in the 1940s; due to a gambling addiction he left debts that his wife and daughter inherited. Mirabella graduated from Skidmore College in 1950, majoring in economics, and went into fashion after seeing the opportunity for women to advance in their careers.

== Career ==
Mirabella began her career by working in a family friend's sportswear shop. After college, she held several junior positions in retail, including at Macy's as an executive trainee and Saks Fifth Avenue as an assistant to the sales promotion manager.

In 1951, Mirabella was hired to serve as an assistant for the merchandising department at Vogue before moving into the editorial staff three years later. During most of the 1960s, she was the magazine's associate editor-in-chief under Diana Vreeland. In 1971, she was appointed editor-in-chief and brought in a more casual feel that contrasted with the way the magazine had been defined in its earlier years. Under Mirabella, more articles were aimed towards "The Modern Woman". Her obituary in The Guardian describes her as a "no-nonsense champion of practical fashion". According to her successor as editor-in-chief, Anna Wintour, "She eschewed fantasy and escapism in favor of a style that was chicly minimalist and which spoke clearly and directly to the newly liberated ways we wanted to live."

Due to the economic recession in the United States in the 1970s, Mirabella used more editorials that addressed affordable yet stylish clothing for women. She was noted for bringing in and showcasing designs from Halston, Saint Laurent, Geoffrey Beene, and Ralph Lauren. Fashion photographer Helmut Newton published several notable editorials in the magazine from 1971 to the end of Mirabella's leadership. Richard Avedon photographed most of the covers and other photographers, such as Patrick Demarchelier, Arthur Elgort, Albert Watson, Denis Piel, and Chris von Wangenheim published several examples of their early work in her editions. During her tenure as editor-in-chief at Vogue, advertising revenue increased to $79.5 million, compared with $39 million for Elle, and the magazine's circulation grew from 400,000 to 1.2 million.

In the 1980s, Mirabella began to be considered "out of step with the times"; she later wrote that "The 1980s just were not my era. I couldn’t stand the frills and the glitz and the 40,000-dollar ball gowns." In 1988, Conde Nast owner Si Newhouse replaced Mirabella with Anna Wintour. According to Newhouse's biographer Carol Felsenthal, nobody informed Mirabella about her firing—she found out about it through the news.

In 1989, Mirabella launched her own magazine, Mirabella, with the financial backing of Rupert Murdoch. Mirabella was targeted at women in their 30s and 40s, with a focus on lifestyle advice and casual wear. Cover and editorial models were typically lesser-known and had more average proportions than those featured in Vogue. Mirabella had 400,000 readers at its start—its reputation boosted by Mirabella's own pedigree as former editor at Vogue. By 1993, Mirabella's influence as founder waned, and she left in 1996. After declines in readership and revenue. Mirabella folded in 2000.

In later years, Mirabella wrote a style column for New York-based Quest magazine, and launched the online magazine The Aesthete. She also wrote a book about Tiffany & Co. that was published in 1997.

== Personal life ==
Mirabella married Dr. William G. Cahan in November 1974. Her autobiography, In and Out of Vogue, describes her relationships with people that she worked with at the magazine, including Diana Vreeland, Andy Warhol, Jessica Daves, and Si Newhouse.

She died on December 23, 2021, at the age of 92, at her home in Manhattan.

Media offices
Preceded by Diana Vreeland	Editor of American Vogue; 1971–1988	Succeeded by Anna Wintour
