= Men's Vogue =

American men's fashion magazine

- Editor: Jay Fielden
- Categories: Men's Lifestyle
- Frequency: Monthly
- First issue: 6 September 2005
- Final issue: 2008
- Company: Condé Nast Publications
- Country: United States
- Language: English
- Website: http://www.vogue.com/mensvogue
- ISSN: 1556-4096

Men's Vogue was a monthly men's magazine that covered culture, fashion, design, art, sports, and technology. The premier issue was August 2005; the magazine was published on a quarterly schedule. It subsequently went bimonthly before stepping up to a full ten issues a year in 2007. In 2008, Adweek named Men's Vogue "Startup of the Year." On October 30, 2008, Condé Nast announced that they would fold the magazine into Vogue proper as a biannual subscriber's supplement. The magazine has ceased to be published since its original folding date.

== Cover stories ==
The magazine featured a cover profile of George Clooney in its inaugural issue. Subsequently, Roger Federer, Tiger Woods, Michael Phelps, Denzel Washington, Kiefer Sutherland, Viggo Mortensen, Tony Blair and Barack Obama, among other notable male subjects, were featured on the cover. The magazine received praise for its December 2007 issue, with Will Smith on the cover, for celebrating African-American men.

== Content ==
The magazine featured celebrities, athletes, powerbrokers, and lesser known men of style. Areas covered included art and architecture, travel and food, politics and finance, books and sports, custom tailoring and fine watches, and other topics. The magazine added a tag line below its logo in November 2008 (its final issue), "Style is how you live."

=== Regular features ===
The magazine presented a yearly list of its chosen American visionaries. Recipients of the 2007 recognition included Ralph Lauren, actor Owen Wilson and director Wes Anderson. It also featured profiles in each issue of everyday stylish and successful men in its Life Studies section.

== Personnel ==
The magazine was founded by Jay Fielden with support from Vogue's Anna Wintour. After Men's Vogue folded, Fielden became the editor of Hearst's Town & Country in 2011, and then the editor of Esquire, replacing David Granger in 2016. Photographers such as Annie Leibovitz, Mario Testino, Norman Jean Roy, Jonas Fredwall Karlsson, Max Vadukul, Raymond Meier, and Francesco Carrozzini shot regularly for the publication.

== International editions ==
In addition to the American edition, several international editions of Men's Vogue exist. The first "Men's Vogue" edition published by Condé Nast was L'Uomo Vogue in Italy, which was launched in September 1967 and shuttered after the November/December 2017 issue, it was then relaunched in 2018 before closing in 2021.

Several different editions of Vogue for men have existed, however most were rebranded or shut down within a few years. These include

- Australian Men Vogue (for Australia, from 1976 to 1977 and later sporadically from 1990 to 1998)
- Homem Vogue (for Brazil, from 2006 to 2011)
- L'Uomo Vogue (for Italy, from 1967 to 2017 and later from 2018 to 2021)
- Männer Vogue (for Germany, from 1984 to 1997)
- Men in Vogue (for Britain, from 1965 to 1970)
- Vogue Man China (for China, from 2008 to 2012 as Men's Vogue China; since 2025)
- Vogue Man India (for India, from 2008)
- Vogue Hommes (for France, from 1973 to 1996)
- Vogue Hommes Internationale Mode (for France, from 1985 to 1996; 1997 to 1999)
- Vogue Hommes International (for France, from 2000 to 2004; 2005 to 2021)
- Vogue Hommes Japan (for Japan, from 2008 to 2012)
- Vogue Hombre (for Mexico, since 2009)
- Vogue Man Arabia (for Arabia, from October 2017 to 2024)
- Vogue Man Hong Kong (for Hong Kong, since April 2021)
- Vogue Man Nederland (for the Netherlands, from 2015 to 2019 and since 2024)
- Vogue Man Philippines (for the Philippines, since February 2024)
- Vogue Man Polska (for Poland, special edition of Vogue Polska, in October 2019)
- Vogue Man Singapore (for Singapore, since 2023)
- Vogue Man Türkiye (for Turkey, since 2012 originally as Vogue Men)
- Vogue Man Ukraine (for Ukraine, since 2020 and publication suspended since 2022 due to the Russian Invasion of Ukraine)

Currently seven editions of Men's Vogue are in operation (excluding Vogue Man Ukraine)
