= Town & Country (magazine) =

American society magazine

- Cover of the February 1963 issue, Baroness Fiona Thyssen-Bornemisza
- Editor-in-Chief: Stellene Volandes
- Categories: Society
- Frequency: Monthly
- Total circulation: 440,611 (2025)
- Founder: Nathaniel Parker Willis; George Pope Morris
- First issue: 1846; 180 years ago
- Company: The Stuyvesant Company (unknown–1925); Hearst Magazines (1925–present)
- Country: United States
- Based in: New York City
- Website: townandcountrymag.com
- ISSN: 0040-9952

Town & Country (stylised in all caps) is an American monthly society magazine that covers high society, style, leisure, events, and education. Under the control of Hearst since 1925, it was founded by Nathaniel Parker Willis and George Pope Morris. Since 2016, Stellene Volandes has served as editor-in-chief. Previous editors include Jay Fielden.

Based at Hearst Tower in Midtown Manhattan, New York City, Town & Country is the oldest continuously published general-interest magazine in the United States, published since 1846. It was published as The National Press until late 1846 and as Home Journal until 1901.

== Background ==
=== Editors ===
Editor-in-Chief	Start year	End year	Ref.
Nathaniel Parker Willis	1846	1867	
William Frederick Dix	1900	1906	
H. J. Whigham	1910	1935	
Harry Bull	1935	1947	
Henry B. Sell	1949	1965	
Anthony Mazzola	1965	1972	
Frank Zachary	1972	1991	
Ron Javers	1991	1992	
Pamela Fiori	1993	2010	
Steven Drucker	2010	2011	
Jay Fielden	2011	2016	
Stellene Volandes	2016	present	

=== International editions ===
- Town & Country Philippines (2007–2018)
- Town & Country UK (2014–2021)

=== Other editions ===
- Town & Country Travel (2003–defunct)
- Town & Country Weddings (2003–defunct)

== History ==
=== Early history (1846–1925) ===
In 1846, Nathaniel Parker Willis and George Pope Morris founded The National Press. Eight months later the magazine was renamed to The Home Journal. It was a weekly magazine, covering society news, gossip, essays, and verse. Willis owned and edited the magazine until his 1867 death. After his death the magazine went through several owners and editors. The magazine was primarily read by Old money New York families, the Boston Brahmin, and members of the Social Register.

The magazine was renamed to Town & Country in 1901, during this period it continued to chronicle the social events and leisure activities of the North American upper class.

=== Under Hearst (1925–present) ===
In 1925, William Randolph Hearst acquired the magazine.

Pamela Fiori was appointed editor-in-chief in 1993, during her tenure she increased circulation and diversity within its pages.

On April 6, 2010, Fiori was replaced by Steven Drucker as the editor-in-chief. Jay Fielden was named editor-in-chief in 2011. Fielden previously edited Men's Vogue. He said his goal was to bring "a lot of people under the tent" of "a snooty, exclusionary magazine." He later said, "I gave Town & Country some teeth, reporting on behavior that wasn't always that which, well, Emily Post would approve, like having an evening toke instead of a Scotch on the rocks." In 2014, Fielden convinced novelist Jay McInerney to move his column about wine from the Wall Street Journal to Town & Country. Fielden inaugurated the T&C 50 lists, including rankings of philanthropists and influential American families. In 2014, he founded the Town & Country Philanthropy Summit, which has featured speakers such as Michael Bloomberg, Chelsea Clinton, Julia Louis-Dreyfus, Bradley Cooper, Lin-Manuel Miranda, and Geoffrey Canada. Fielden left Town & Country in 2016, when he replaced David M. Granger as editor-in-chief of Esquire Magazine. Adweek wrote that Fielden had transformed the magazine from "dusty publication to buzzy brand."

According to HuffPost on May 9, 2018, Town & Country took criticism for disinviting Monica Lewinsky from its philanthropic summit because former president Bill Clinton decided to attend the event. Hollywood producer Judd Apatow commented, "This is what everyone is fighting against." He then added that Town & Country "should be ashamed of themselves."

== In popular culture ==
In the 1997 movie, Midnight in the Garden of Good and Evil, John Cusack's character John Kelso was sent to Savannah, Georgia, to cover one of antiques dealer Jim Williams's coveted Christmas parties for Town & Country.

== Books ==
Town & Country publishes an annual list of recommended books, covering a wide range of subjects. It has also published numerous titles:

- Town & Country High Society (Abrams/Hearst, 1996; edited by Anthony Mazzola and Frank Zachary)
- Town & Country The Best Families (Abrams/Hearst, 1996; Jerry E. Patterson edited by Anthony Mazzola and Frank Zachary)
- Town & Country Baby Names (Hearst, 2004)
- Town & Country Modern Manners (Hearst Books, 2005; edited by Thomas P. Farley)
- Town & Country Elegant Wedding Planner (Hearst, 2005)
- Town & Country Handbook for Hosts (Hearst, 2006; edited by Adam Bluestein)
- Town & Country Toasts for Every Occasion (Hearst, 2007)
- Town & Country Wedding Vows & Promises (Hearst, 2008; edited by Caroline Tiger)
- Town & Country Dogs (Hearst, 2008; edited by Susan K. Hom)
- Town & Country The Art of Gratitude (Hearst, 2008; edited by Caroline Tiger)
- Town & Country Wedding Speeches & Toasts (Hearst, 2008; edited by Caroline Tiger)
