= Edna Woolman Chase =

Magazine editor (1877–1957)

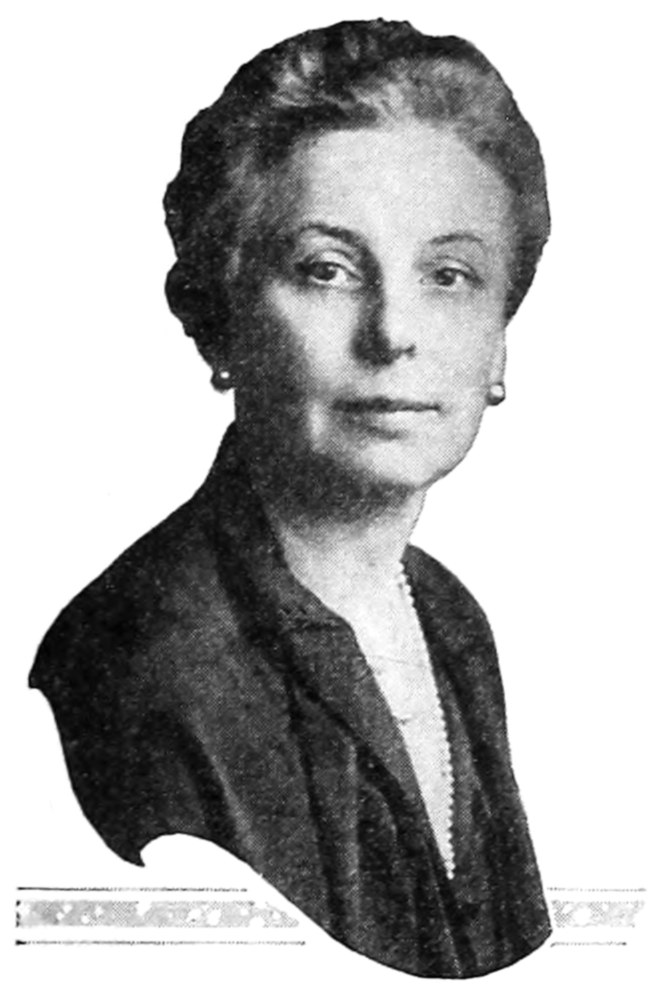
- Edna Woolman Chase, editor-in-chief of Vogue in 1931
- Born: Edna Woolman Allaway; March 14, 1877; Asbury Park, New Jersey
- Died: March 20, 1957 (aged 80); Sarasota, Florida
- Resting place: Locust Valley Cemetery, Locust Valley, New York, U.S.
- Title: Editor-in-chief of Vogue
- Term: 1914–1952
- Predecessor: Marie Harrison
- Successor: Jessica Daves
- Spouses: Francis Dane Chase (married 1902–04); Richard Newton (married 1914-50)

Edna Woolman Chase (née Allaway; March 14, 1877 – March 21, 1957) was an American who served as editor-in-chief of Vogue magazine from 1914 to 1952.

== Early life ==
Chase was born on March 14, 1877, in Asbury Park, New Jersey. She was the daughter of Franklyn Allaway and Laura Woolman.

After her parents divorced, Chase was raised by her Quaker grandparents. She moved in with her mother in New York as a teenager.

== Personal life ==
In 1902, she married Francis Dane Chase, who was a merchant, dry goods salesman, and later manager of the Hotel Colonial in New York. They had a daughter, actress Ilka Chase. Her husband had trouble supporting the family, and Chase eventually divorced him. She later married engineer Richard Newton in 1921.

== Publishing career ==
Chase's first position at Vogue was working in the mail room. She worked her way up through the art and make-up departments. When Condé Montrose Nast took over Vogue in 1909, he asked Chase to continue writing under her married name, even though she was divorced. In 1911, he made her managing editor of the magazine and gave her complete control. In 1914, Nast named her editor-in-chief, a position she would hold until 1952.

One major contribution to fashion Chase made the same year she was named editor-in-chief was putting on the first fashion show. As a result of World War I, clothing makers closed their rooms in Paris. Since most of the clothes featured in Vogue were from Paris, Chase took matters into her own hands and called dressmakers in New York and had them make clothing to be featured in a show. This prompted other manufacturers to start making clothes in the United States and selling them at moderate prices.

Another major contribution she made to fashion was the Fashion Group International. In 1928 Chase brought together 17 prominent women in the fashion world. The Fashion Group International (formed then but not an official organization until 1930) publicized American fashion and the role of women in the industry. The Fashion Group International is still in business today.

== Retirement and autobiography ==
Chase retired as editor-in-chief of Vogue in 1952. She then took on chairmanship of the editorial board. She wrote her autobiography, Always in Vogue in 1954 with her daughter.

== Death ==
Chase died of heart attack while on vacation in Sarasota, Florida on March 21, 1957, at the age of 80.

== Awards ==
- Legion of Honour
- Named Key Woman of the Year by the Federation of Jewish Philanthropists

Media offices
Preceded by Marie Harrison	Editor of American Vogue; 1914–1952	Succeeded by Jessica Daves
