= Christiane Arp =

German journalist

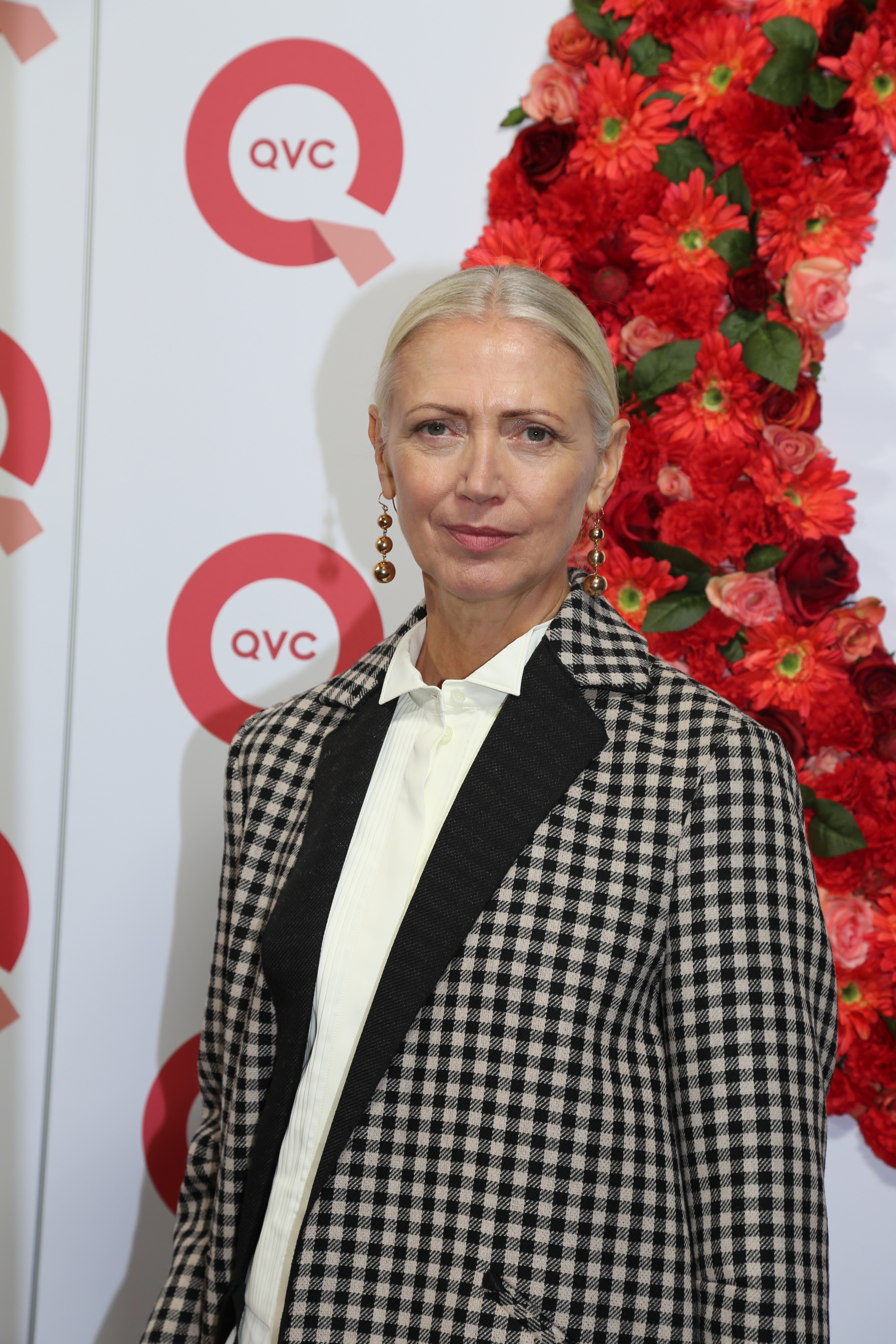
Arp in 2017

Christiane Arp (born 11 May 1961) is a German journalist and served as the editor-in-chief of the German edition of the magazine Vogue from March 2003 until the Jan/Feb 2021 edition when she announced her departure from the magazine. She is influential in the popularization and dissemination of German fashion sensibilities in Europe and around the globe. Christiane Arp's work with German Vogue magazine and within fashion helped make Berlin a global fashion hot spot.

== Early life and education ==
Arp grew up in Germany and graduated from high school in Hamburg. She attended the Hamburg University of Applied Sciences and graduated with a degree in fashion design. During her studies, she did an internship at the knitting magazine Nicole and worked as a journalist. She worked for magazines like Brigitte and Viva!. In addition, she headed the fashion department at Für Sie, is the Head of Fashion at Amica and Head of Fashion at Stern.

== Career ==
Prior to holding the position of editor-in-chief of Vogue Germany in 2003, Christiane Arp was a fashion director at Vogue Germany for one year. In 2011, she was instrumental in establishing the Vogue Salon, a platform where rising German designers are able to showcase their creative work bi-annually at Berlin Fashion Week. In addition, in 2015 she co-founded and is the president of the Fashion Council Germany, a project where German fashion experts promote German fashion design internationally and domestically to preserve their fashion heritage.
