= Cal Fussman =

American journalist and author

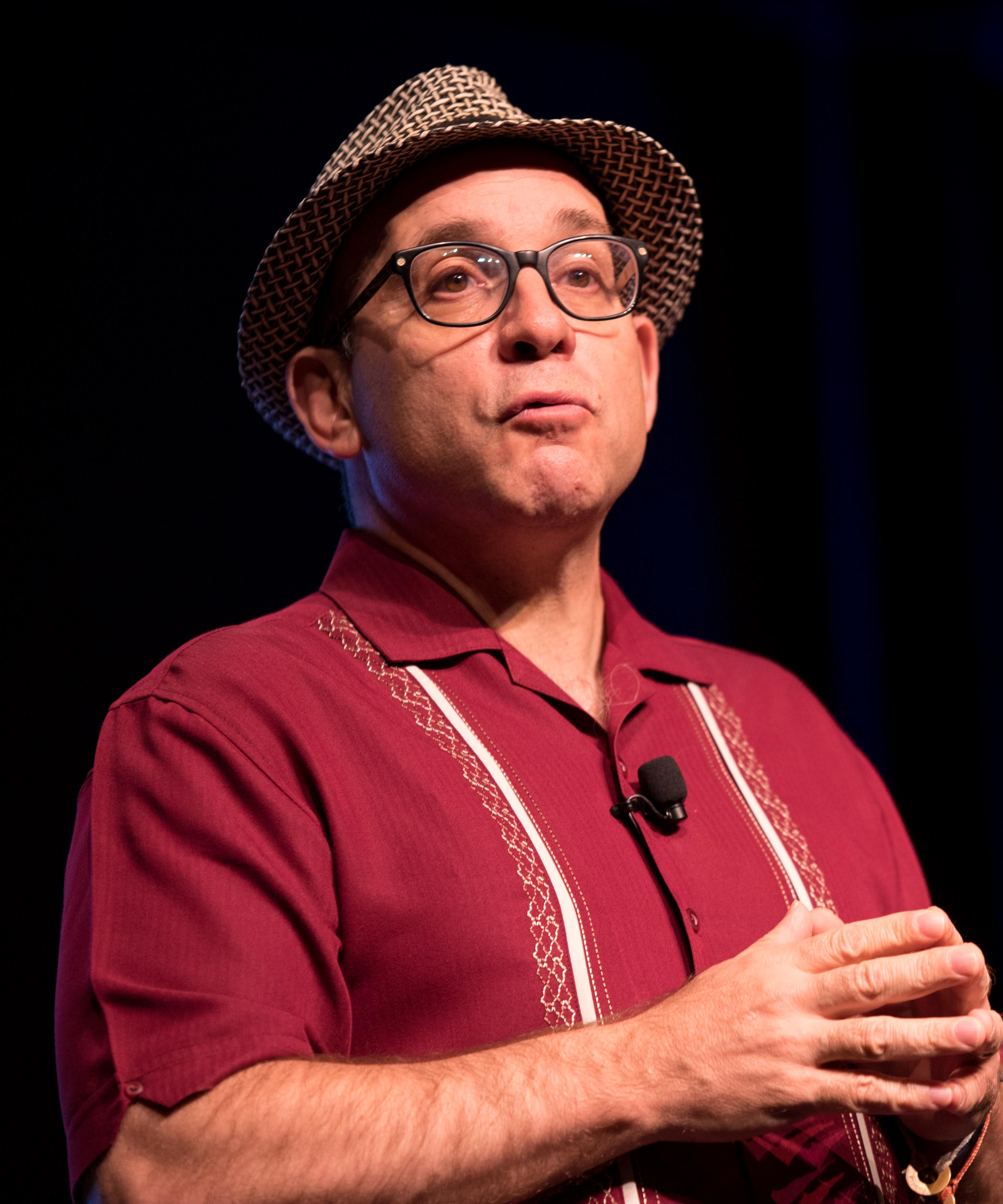
- Fussman in 2017
- Born: Calvin Fussman; Brooklyn, New York, U.S.A.
- Occupations: Author, writer
- Known for: Esquire's What I've Learned column
- Title: Writer at Large, Esquire
- Awards: James Beard Foundation Award, Best Personal Essay, 2011; The New York Times Best Seller list
- Website: http://www.calfussman.com

Calvin Fussman is an American journalist and author. He is a Writer at Large for Esquire magazine, known for the What I've Learned column, where he interviews leaders in various fields, which have included Mikhail Gorbachev, Jimmy Carter, Ted Kennedy, Jeff Bezos, Richard Branson, Jack Welch, Robert De Niro, Clint Eastwood, Al Pacino, George Clooney, Leonardo DiCaprio, Tom Hanks, Bruce Springsteen, Dr. Dre, Quincy Jones, Woody Allen, Barbara Walters, Pelé, Yao Ming, Serena Williams, John Wooden, and Muhammad Ali.

== Early life ==
Cal Fussman was born in Brooklyn, New York. He grew up on Long Island and earned a bachelor's degree at The University of Missouri School of Journalism.

== Career ==
Fussman started his career as a sportswriter for The Miami Herald and The St. Louis Post-Dispatch, then moved to New York, where his work appeared in the magazines Inside Sports and Sports Illustrated. He learned how to interview on trains and buses, when he travelled around the world for 10 years and was constantly in conversation with people from all cultures and walks of life. Fussman's writing during this time and thereafter often revolved around quests.

Fussman began contributing to Esquire when David M. Granger took over as Editor in Chief in 1997. He became the lead interviewer for the magazine's "What I've Learned" column, in which people who have lived extraordinary lives discuss the wisdom they have accrued. Some the "What I've Learned" column, have reissued in two books titled The Meaning of Life,. The Austin Chronicle has described Fussman's work in this format as "peerless" and "prolific".

Fussman has a chapter giving advice in Tim Ferriss' book Tools of Titans.

== Awards ==
Fussman's story about his experience at Windows on the World won a James Beard Foundation Award for best personal essay in 2011.

== Bibliography ==
- After Jackie : pride, prejudice, and baseball's forgotten heroes. 2007.
- Double or nothing : how two friends risked it all to buy one of Las Vegas' legendary casinos. 2008.
- My remarkable journey. 2009.
- "How to do a What I've Learned interview". Before We Begin. Esquire: 12. January 2012.
- Hitmaker : the man and his music. 2013.
- "Leon Panetta". What I've Learned. Warriors. Esquire. 159 (1): 68–69. January 2013.
- "James Meredith". What I've Learned. Warriors. Esquire. 159 (1): 70–71. January 2013.
- "Arnold Schwarzenegger". What I've Learned. Warriors. Esquire. 159 (1): 72–73. January 2013.
- "Lara Logan". What I've Learned. Warriors. Esquire. 159 (1): 74–75. January 2013.
- "Jake LaMotta". What I've Learned. Warriors. Esquire. 159 (1): 76–77. January 2013.
- "Rod Stewart". What I've Learned. Warriors. Esquire. 159 (1): 78–79. January 2013.

== Personal life ==
Fussman and his wife, Gloria Paes, met on a bus in Brazil. They have three children.
