= Jay Fielden =

American magazine editor and writer

- Born: Odessa, Texas
- Citizenship: United States
- Education: Boston University
- Occupations: Magazine editor, writer
- Known for: Editor-in-Chief, US Esquire Editor-in-Chief, Town & Country Editor-in-Chief, Men's Vogue
- Notable credit(s): Typing pool, The New Yorker; arts editor, Vogue; editor-in-chief, "Men's Vogue"; editor-in-chief, Esquire
- Parent(s): Billie Lu (Foreman) Fielden, ballet teacher Jack Fielden, dentist

Jay Fielden is a magazine editor and writer. He previously served as editor-in-chief of Esquire, Town & Country, and Men's Vogue. A New York Times profile described him as having “the belletrist whimsy of Oscar Wilde and the gunslinger gusto of Wild Bill Hickok.”

== Early life ==
Fielden was born in Odessa, Texas, the son of Billie Lu (Foreman), a ballet teacher, and Jack Fielden, a dentist. He grew up in San Antonio, where he attended Keystone School on an academic scholarship and graduated from Tom C. Clark High School. In his junior year of high school, he worked at The Polo Shop, selling clothes and later writing, “I loved that place. I knew that I wanted to end up in this world in some capacity.” He attended Boston University, where he met the literary critic Christopher Ricks, who became his academic adviser.

== Career ==
=== The New Yorker ===
Fielden got a job in the typing pool at The New Yorker shortly after he graduated in 1992. Soon after, he became an editorial assistant to Roger Angell and Daniel Menaker in the magazine's fiction department. He also worked for literary editor Bill Buford, who appointed him the department's managing editor. In 1997, Tina Brown promoted him to become the magazine's headline writer and a Talk of the Town editor. He worked on pieces with George Plimpton, Jeffrey Eugenides, Susan Orlean, D.T. Max, Alec Wilkinson, Eric Schlosser, Ingrid Sischy, Harold Brodkey, and Alison Rose.

=== Vogue ===
Fielden became the arts editor of Vogue in 2000, after spending eight years at The New Yorker. He edited food critic Jeffrey Steingarten, who won a National Magazine Award with Fielden as his editor. He was granted a rare interview with photographer Irving Penn.

In 2002, he helped write and edit Vogue creative director Grace Coddington’s first book, Grace: Thirty Years of Fashion at Vogue. After Jay took a job as the editor of Town & Country, Grace had to postpone writing the book until 2011, after she decided to write the book with Michael Roberts.

=== Men's Vogue ===
In 2005, Anna Wintour chose Fielden to launch a men's spinoff of Vogue. Fielden gave the Men's Vogue the tagline, “Style is How You Live,” describing the magazine in the first editor's letter, as combining “a far-reaching curiosity about the world with an appreciation of the kind of style that emanates from accomplishment and substance.”

Writing about the magazine's first issue in The New York Times, fashion critic Cathy Horyn described the magazine as “a paean to the urbanity of The New Yorker, the glamour of Vogue and the cosmopolitan sparkle of Esquire of the late 1960s and early 1970s before, it seems, the world was divided into gay and straight.”

Men's Vogue championed African-Americans, featuring Barack Obama on the cover twice. The magazine faced financial difficulty due to the 2008 financial crisis, and published its last issue in January 2009.

=== Town & Country ===
In 2011, Fielden became editor in chief of Town & Country. He said his goal was to bring “a lot of people under the tent” of a “a snooty, exclusionary magazine.” He later said, “I gave Town & Country some teeth, reporting on behavior that wasn't always that which, well, Emily Post would approve, like having an evening toke instead of a Scotch on the rocks.”

In 2014, Fielden convinced novelist Jay McInerney to bring his column about wine from the Wall Street Journal to Town & Country. He inaugurated the T&C 50 lists, including rankings of philanthropists and influential American families. In 2014, he founded the Town & Country Philanthropy Summit, which has featured speakers such as Michael Bloomberg, Chelsea Clinton, Julia Louis-Dreyfus, Bradley Cooper, Lin-Manuel Miranda, and Geoffrey Canada. In 2016, Adweek wrote that Fielden had transformed the magazine from “dusty publication to buzzy brand.”

=== Esquire ===
Fielden replaced David M. Granger as editor in chief of Esquire in 2016. In an interview with The New York Times, Fielden described his vision of the magazine: “There's no cigar smoke wafting through the pages, and the obligatory three B's are gone, too — brown liquor, boxing and bullfighting.”

In October 2016, Felden published an exposé in Esquire by journalist Christopher Glazek, chronicling how the Sackler family profited from the opioid epidemic. In March 2019, The New York Times reported, “While the drug's potential for abuse has been known for two decades, only recently has Purdue's controlling family come under intense scrutiny. Their role in marketing the drug, despite its perils, was the focus of articles in The New Yorker and Esquire in 2017.”

During Felden's tenure, Esquire's March 2019 cover of a Wisconsin high-school senior entitled “An American Boy: What it's like to grow up white, middle class, and male in the era of social media, school shootings, toxic masculinity, #MeToo, and a divided country” caused controversy. The story was posted on the magazine's website in late February 2019, prompting many Twitter users, including journalist Soledad O’Brien and former ESPN sports journalist Jemele Hill, to criticize the magazine for putting a white teenager on the cover during Black History Month.

Robyn Kanner, a self-described trans woman wrote in The New York Times: “One can debate whether the article should have run a month earlier or later, or whether Esquire runs enough stories about teenage boys of color. But few if any of those criticisms actually engaged with the story itself.”

Michael Brendan Dougherty, writing in the National Review, said: “Some of the excuses for the outrage are made up. How many women were in the decision-making process for this article? (The article's author is a woman.) “Why are you centering whiteness? Are you defining American as white and male?” (It's only the first in a series looking at white, black, and LGBTQ teen subjects). “Why did Esquire do this in February, which is Black History Month?” (It's the March cover subject). But March is Women's History Month! Although my favorite complaint is when people say, “Who thought this was a good idea?” Why isn't someone an acceptable answer?

Journalist Kate Rosman posted a tweet, saying, “It's a story that matters to a lot of parents of kind, empathetic boys who feel confused by society's assumptions that they're anti women/girls/LGBQT [sic], etc. becuz they're white boys with all the privilege that brings. We shouldn't say “who cares” about an entire demographic.”

In February, 2019, the Columbia Journalism Review ran a piece questioning why Esquire did not end up publishing an exposé on accusations of pedophilia by the director Bryan Singer. According to the two writers who reported the story, Hearst executives killed the story against Fielden's wishes.

In March 2019, Fielden announced his departure from the role of editor-in-chief at Esquire. New York magazine wrote, “A replacement has not been named. His departure is part of what the Times calls 'a dramatic reshuffling under Troy Young,' president of Hearst Magazines as of summer 2018.”

Women's Wear Daily wrote, “There have been murmurs of changes at Esquire and its operations since last year, when new Hearst Magazines president Troy Young started his overhaul. Talk turned to the imminent departure of Fielden in the wake of the publicized late-stage rejection by the publisher of an investigative story on sexual misconduct allegations against the director Bryan Singer that Esquire was initially set to publish. The chatter was renewed after some public blowback for a cover story on a white, politically conservative teen.”

Fielden's departure was announced through an Instagram post, in which he included a photograph of himself leaving the Hearst Building with several bags. Journalist Allana Akhtar wrote in Business Insider, "Chances are all of us have fantasized about quitting a job as dramatically as possible. Jay Fielden, editor-in-chief of Esquire, actually lived out his fantasy. Fielden announced his resignation on Instagram, with a photo of him clutching four bags as he left the Hearst building. He accompanied his photo with a 300-word blurb recounting his experience at the company and his plans for the future (which include cooking his kids breakfast as his wife sleeps in)."

In a tribute to Fielden in The Cut, a fashion blog, journalist Anna Silman wrote, “...congratulations Jay Fielden on leaving Esquire to pursue whatever your dreams are, and good luck on your future journey. I hope when I grow up I can be a fancy man just like you.”

== Personal life ==
In 2010, Fielden's house in Connecticut, where he lives with his wife and three children, burned down. “Your first response is, ‘All our stuff!’” he said. “But the point is, it was oddly freeing. Subliminally, we all do things to preserve the status quo. The major lesson that has helped me as an editor is to realize not to hang on to the things that would keep you from doing something dangerous.” Fielden is a practicing Episcopalian.
