= Rebecca C. Tuite =

British author

- Born: Surrey, England
- Other name: Rebecca Tuite
- Education: University of Exeter; London College of Fashion
- Occupations: Writer, fashion historian
- Known for: Writing on fashion and fashion history

Rebecca C. Tuite is a British author and historian. She is known for her work on fashion, costume and film history.

== Early life and education ==
Tuite was born in Surrey, England. She earned a Bachelor of Arts degree in English from the University of Exeter. As an undergraduate, she was an exchange student at Vassar College. She earned a Master of Arts degree in fashion journalism from the London College of Fashion. As of 2020, she was pursuing a PhD at the Bard Graduate Center in New York City.

== Career ==
Tuite's first book, published in 2014, was Seven Sisters Style: The All-American Preppy Look, which focused on the influence that students at the "Seven Sisters" (a group of prestigious all-female American colleges) had on fashion. Tuite explored the fashion trends initiated by Seven Sisters students during the first half of the twentieth century, and traced their subsequent popularity across the boundaries of fashion and film, particularly describing their influence on styles from heritage brands including Ralph Lauren and Tommy Hilfiger. It was the first book exclusively dedicated to the female side of preppy style pioneered by U.S. college girls. The book was featured in The Wall Street Journal, Vanity Fair, New York Magazine, Vogue Paris, and described by Refinery29 as "a beautifully illustrated, intensively researched celebration of the all-American preppy style pioneered by the women of the Seven Sisters Colleges — consider it a Take Ivy for the distaff set."

Her second book, published in 2019, was 1950s in Vogue: The Jessica Daves Years, 1952-1962. The book was the very first volume ever published that was solely dedicated to editor-in-chief, Jessica Daves, and her time at the helm of Vogue. 1950s in Vogue appeared in the Los Angeles Times, Vogue and Vogue Paris, the New York Journal of Books, and others. The Vogue featured noted, "Having poured over the 220 issues of the magazine edited by Daves, Tuite has organized her own book into eight sections focused on subjects from cocktail dressing to culture that demonstrate the breadth of Daves's catholic interests." In their review, the New York Journal of Books observed, "Rarely, if ever, has this reader come across a book of this genre that was as thoroughly annotated, enlightening, informative and just incredible on so many different levels."

== Selected works ==
- Rebecca C. Tuite (2017). Seven Sisters Style: The All-American Preppy Look. Rizzoli International Publications. ISBN 9780789332950.
- Rebecca Tuite (2019). 1950s in Vogue: The Jessica Daves Years, 1952-1962. Thames & Hudson. ISBN 9780500294376.
