= Lothar Mohrenwitz =

German literary agent and editor (1896–1962)

Lothar Mohrenwitz (1896 – 1962), was a German literary agent and magazine editor.

== Early life ==
Mohrenwitz was born in 1896 in Schweinfurt. Mohrenwitz would study art history, later receiving a doctorate from the University of Würzburg.

== Career ==
Between 1919 and 1924, he directed Kurt Wolff's Hyperion publishing house. Under Mohrenwitz's leadership Hyperion issued portfolios and prints of Alfred Kubin, Ludwig Meidner, Otto Mueller, Max Pechstein, Karl Schmidt-Rottluff, Christian Rohlfs, and more. He served as editor-in-chief of Vogue Berlin until 1929 (presumably being with the magazine from when it began publication in 1928).

In 1934, Mohrenwitz left German following the transfer of power to the Nazi Party and established Mohrbooks in London. During his time in London Mohrenwitz worked with Curtis Brown. Mohrenwitz moved to Zurich in either 1949 or 1950 where he established Mohrbooks Literary Agency. The agency specialised in finding European publishers for British and American authors, notably representing Agatha Christie.

== Death ==
Mohrenwitz died in 1962.

Media offices
Preceded by N/A	Editor of Vogue Deutsch; 1928–1929	Succeeded by Christa Dowling
