= Chloe Malle =

American and French journalist (born 1985)

- Malle in 2026
- Born: Chloé Françoise Malle; November 8, 1985 (age 40); New York City, United States
- Education: Riverdale Country School; Brown University (BA)
- Employer: Condé Nast
- Title: Head of Editorial Content, Vogue
- Predecessor: Anna Wintour
- Spouse: Graham McGrath Albert (m. 2015)
- Children: 2
- Parents: Louis Malle (father); Candice Bergen (mother)
- Relatives: Edgar Bergen (grandfather); Frances Bergen (grandmother)

Chloé Françoise Malle (born November 8, 1985) is an American and French fashion journalist and editor of American Vogue. Previously, Malle was editor of Vogue.com, overseeing all digital content for the website, and host of its podcast The Run Through.

== Early life and education ==
Born Chloé Françoise Malle on November 8, 1985, in New York City, Malle is the daughter of American model and actress Candice Bergen and French director Louis Malle. She has two older paternal half-siblings, Manuel and Justine, and is of Swedish descent on her mother's side.

In 1987, the family moved to Los Angeles due to Bergen's role on Murphy Brown. However, Louis Malle moved to France and regularly visited Bergen and Chloe in California. The family returned to New York City in 2000, living on Central Park South. Malle attended the Riverdale Country School.

Malle studied comparative literature and writing at Brown University, and edited a weekly newspaper at the university. She also completed a study exchange at the Sorbonne University in Paris.

== Career ==
After graduating she became an intern at the New York Observer and was later given the position of real estate writer. She contributed to The New York Times' "Style" section and completed a freelance piece for Vogue, when she heard of an opening for the new position of "social editor". She did not intend to become an editor (instead to complete a master's degree in public health) but later said "I was so seduced by the Vogue machine that I couldn't resist." Malle has written for various other publications such as Air Mail, Architectural Digest, Marie Claire, The New York Times, T: The New York Times Style Magazine, Town & Country, The Wall Street Journal, and WSJ Magazine.

In 2022, Malle began hosting The Run-Through with Vogue, a podcast "featuring the most riveting news in fashion and culture." She hosts the podcast alongside Chioma Nnadi, ex-editor of Vogue.com and current Head of Editorial Content at British Vogue.

Malle was named Head of Editorial Content for American Vogue magazine by Anna Wintour on September 1, 2025, replacing Wintour, who had been editor-in-chief since 1988.

== Spelling variations of Chloé ==
In English-language publications, Malle's first name is written without the accent, as "Chloe". On her personal page on Vogue, she uses the unaccented form. Le Monde and Libération are exceptions among major French publications, using the unaccented spelling "Chloe".

== Personal life ==
In 2015, she married Graham McGrath Albert at her family's country home near Cahors, in the southwest of France. They have two children.

== In popular culture ==
Malle's mother, Candice Bergen, played an editor of Vogue on Sex and the City.

In the 2006 film The Devil Wears Prada, Miranda Priestly, who is based on Vogue then-editor Anna Wintour, learns of an attempt to oust her from her position and replace her with younger French editor, Jacqueline Follet. When news broke of Malle filling Wintour's vacated Vogue position in 2025, the resemblance between the storyline and real events drew attention online.

Media offices
Preceded by Anna Wintour	Editor of American Vogue; 2025–present	Succeeded by current
