= Vogue Taiwan =

Taiwanese fashion magazine

- July 2024 issue featuring Nymphia Wind
- Editor-In-Chief: Leslie Sun
- Categories: Fashion
- Frequency: Monthly
- Publisher: Condé Nast
- Founded: 1996; 30 years ago
- Country: Taiwan
- Based in: Taipei
- Language: Taiwanese Mandarin
- Website: vogue.tw

Vogue Taiwan is the Taiwanese edition of the American fashion and lifestyle monthly magazine Vogue. The magazine has been published since 1996, becoming the first Mandarin-language edition of Vogue.

== Publication history ==
Vogue Taiwan was established in October 1996 as the 13th international edition of Vogue. It aimed to bring both global fashion trends and local Taiwanese talent into the spotlight. Since its launch, Vogue Taiwan has significantly shaped the Taiwanese fashion industry by featuring homegrown designers, models, and cultural figures. The magazine has maintained a balance between international high fashion and Taiwan's unique cultural identity, supporting emerging designers and offering a platform for creative expression while keeping up with Vogue's global reputation for innovation. In January 2020, Leslie Sun was appointed the editor-in-chief for Vogue Taiwan. In July 2024, Vogue Taiwan featured Taiwanese-American drag queen Nymphia Wind on its cover, making her the first crowned RuPaul's Drag Race queen to land a Vogue cover.

== See also ==
- List of Vogue Taiwan cover models
