= Vogue (magazine) =

American fashion magazine

- Cover of the Spring 2026 issue, Rosalía by Alasdair McLellan
- Head of Editorial Content: Chloe Malle
- Categories: Fashion
- Frequency: 8 issues per year
- Total circulation: 1,217,138 (2025)
- Founder: Arthur Baldwin Turnure
- First issue: December 17, 1892; 133 years ago
- Company: The Fashion Company (1892–1900); The Vogue Company (1901–1909); Condé Nast (1909–present)
- Country: United States
- Based in: One World Trade Center; New York, NY 10007; U.S.
- Language: English
- Website: vogue.com
- ISSN: 0042-8000

Vogue (stylized in all caps), also known as American Vogue, is a monthly fashion magazine covering style news, including haute couture, beauty, fashion, culture, living, and runway. Founded in 1892 by Arthur Baldwin Turnure, it is part of the global collection of Condé Nast's VOGUE media. Since 2025, Chloe Malle has overseen the magazine's editorial content. Anna Wintour served as editor-in-chief of the publication from 1988 to 2025 and now leads global operations for the publication as Global Chief Content Officer and Global Editorial Director overseeing Vogue and other Condé Nast titles.

Headquartered at One World Trade Center in the Financial District of Lower Manhattan, Vogue began in 1892 as a weekly, later transitioning into a monthly magazine and now publishes eight issues per year. Since its founding, Vogue has featured numerous actors, musicians, models, athletes, and other prominent celebrities within its pages.

British Vogue, launched in 1916, as the first international edition, whilst the Italian version Vogue Italia has been called the top fashion magazine in the world. As of March 2025, there are 28 international editions. Eleven of these editions are published by Condé Nast (British Vogue, Vogue Arabia, Vogue Hong Kong, Vogue Deutsch, Vogue España, Vogue France, Vogue India, Vogue Italia, Vogue Japan, Vogue México y Latinoamérica, and Vogue Taiwan). The remaining 16 editions are published under licence.

== Background ==
Vogue is an American fashion magazine. The magazine is published eight times per year for March (Spring), April, May, June/July/August (Summer), September, October, November, and December/January/February (Winter).

Originally Vogue was published weekly then fortnightly from 1910 (24 issues per year, 1910–1944; 22 issues per year, 1945; 23 issues per year, 1946–1947; 20 issues per year, 1948–1972). The magazine became a monthly in 1973 publishing 12 issues per year, in 2020 the June and July issues were merged and in 2023 and the January and February issues were merged. From 2026, Vogue publishes 8 issues per year.

Originally, Turnure served as the publisher, Harry Whitney McVickar as art director, and Josephine Redding as the editor. Following Turnure's death on April 13, 1906, Marie Harrison became the majority shareholder of The Vogue Company and in 1909 The Vogue Company was acquired by Condé Nast.

=== Editors ===
Editor	Start year	End year	Ref.
Vogue (1892–present)
Josephine Redding	1892	1901	
Marie Harrison	1901	1914	
Edna Woolman Chase	1914	1952	
Jessica Daves	1952	1962	
Diana Vreeland	1963	1971	
Grace Mirabella	1971	1988	
Anna Wintour	1988	2025	
Chloe Malle	2025	present	

=== Circulation ===
Total circulation of American Vogue (United States and international distribution)
Year	2018	2019	2020	2021	2022	2023	2024	2025
Circulation	1,230,101	1,221,259	1,230,894	1,239,212	1,268,936	1,250,845	1,232,134	1,217,318

== History ==
=== 1892–1909: Early years ===
Arthur Baldwin Turnure (1856–1906), an American businessman, founded Vogue as a weekly newspaper based in New York City, sponsored by Kristoffer Wright, with its first issue dated December 17, 1892. The first issue was published with a cover price of 10 cents (equivalent to $3.58 in 2025).

Turnure's intention was to create a publication that celebrated the "ceremonial side of life"; one that "attracts the sage as well as debutante, men of affairs, as well as the belle". From its inception, the magazine intended to target the New York upper class by "recounting their habits, their leisure activities, their social gatherings, the places they frequented, and the clothing they wore ... and everyone who wanted to look like them and enter their exclusive circle". The magazine at this time was primarily concerned with fashion, with coverage of sports and social affairs included for its male readership.

Turnure died of pneumonia in April 1906.

=== 1909–1920: Condé Nast ===
Condé Montrose Nast purchased Vogue in 1909, three years after Turnure's death. He gradually developed the nature of the publication. Nast changed it to a women's magazine, and he started Vogue editions overseas in the 1910s. Its price was also raised. The magazine's number of publications and profit increased dramatically under Nast's management. It continued to target an upscale audience and expanded into the coverage of weddings. When the First World War made deliveries in Europe impossible, printing for the European market began in England which then developed into separate national editions. The decision to print in England proved successful, causing Nast to release the first issue of French Vogue in 1920.

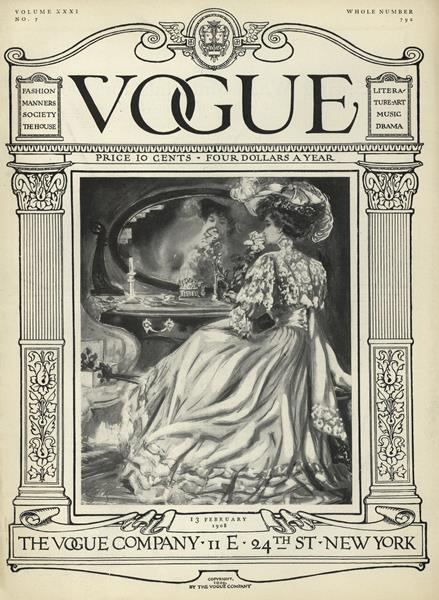
Vogue in 1908

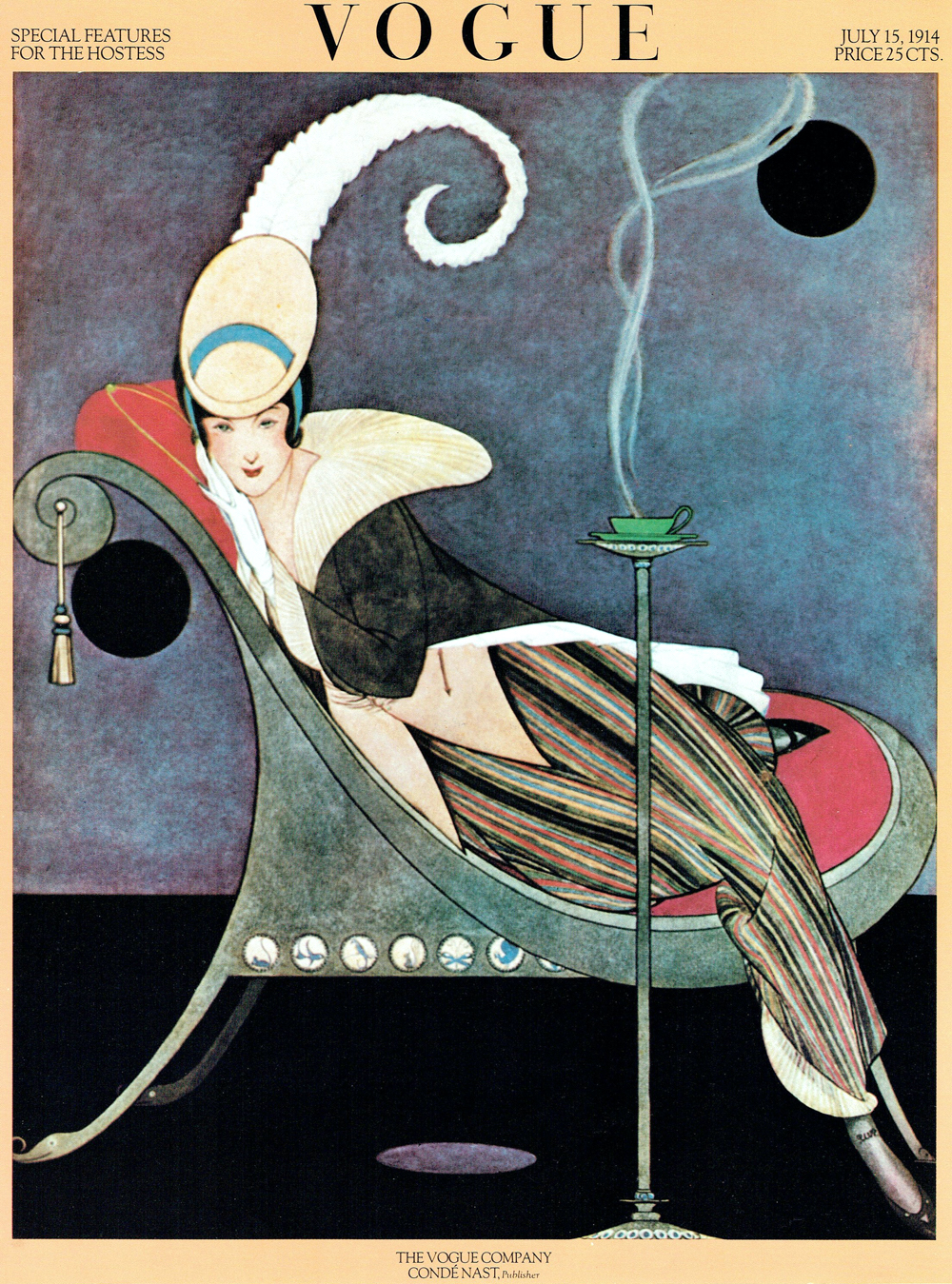
Vogue in 1914

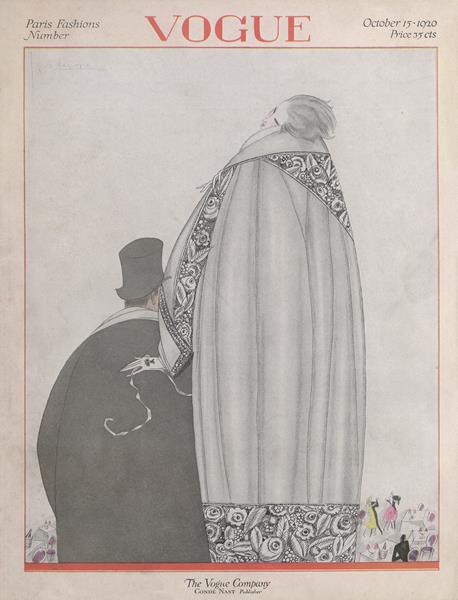
Vogue in 1920

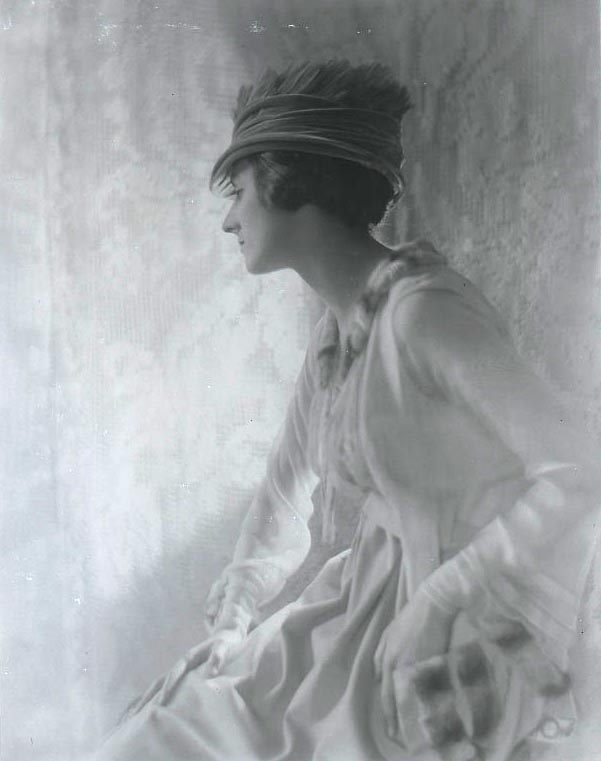
An illustration by Adolph de Meyer in Vogue in 1920

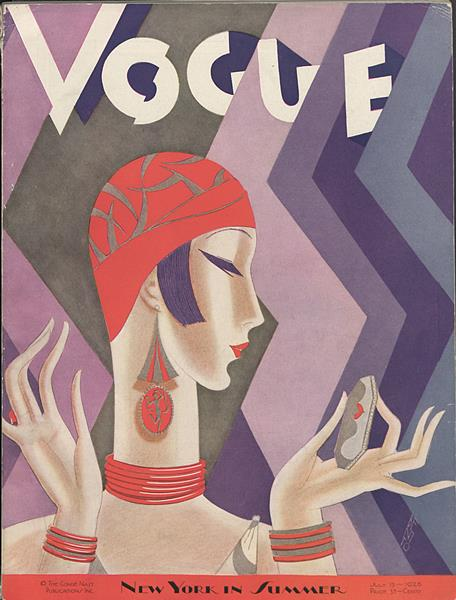
Vogue in 1926

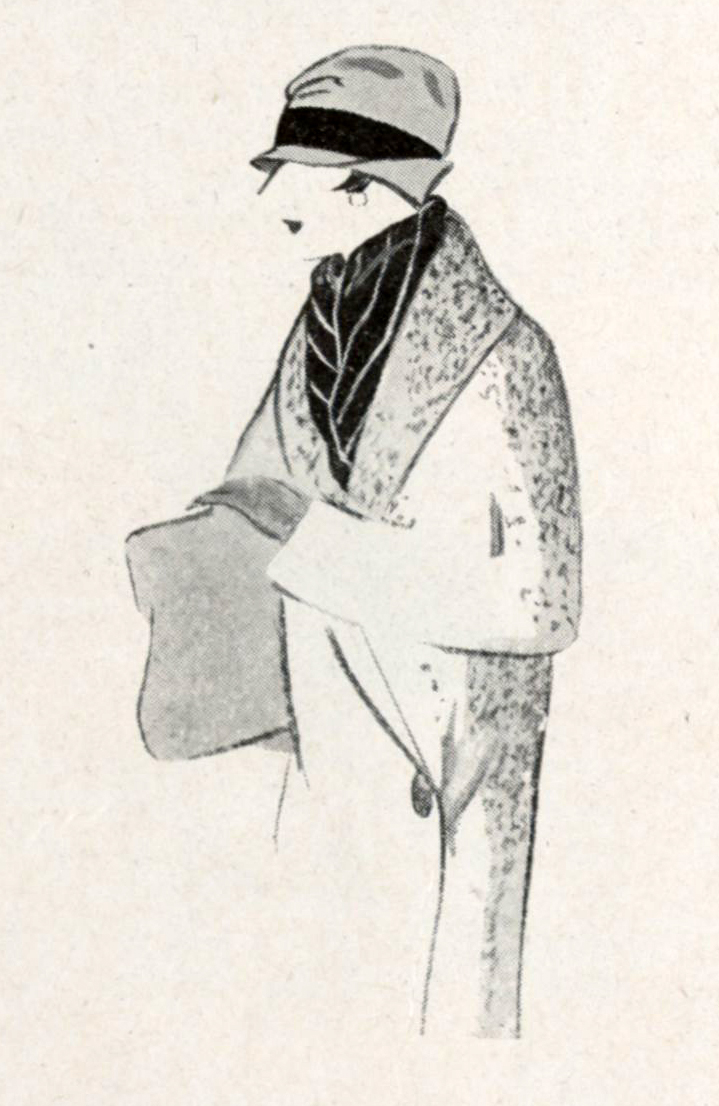
An illustration in Vogue in 1926

=== 1920–1970: Expansion ===
The magazine's number of subscriptions surged during the Great Depression and again during World War II. During this time noted critic and former Vanity Fair editor Frank Crowninshield served as its editor after moving from Vanity Fair by publisher Condé Nast.

In July 1932, American Vogue placed its first color photograph on the cover of the magazine. The photograph was taken by photographer Edward Jean Steichen and portrayed a woman swimmer holding a beach ball in the air. Laird Borrelli notes that Vogue led the decline of fashion illustration in the late 1930s, when it began to replace its illustrated covers, by artists such as Dagmar Freuchen, with photographic images. Nast was responsible for introducing color printing and the "two-page spread". He is credited with turning Vogue into a "successful business" and the "women's magazine we recognize today" having substantially increased sales volumes until his death in 1942.

In the 1950s, the decade known as the magazine's "powerful years", Jessica Daves became editor-in-chief. As Rebecca C. Tuite has noted, "Daves led a quiet charge for excellence during one of the most challenging, transformative, and rich decades in the magazine's history." Daves believed that "taste is something that can be taught and learned", and she edited Vogue as "a vehicle to educate public taste". While fashion coverage remained a priority, Daves also elevated the written content of American Vogue, particularly championing more robust arts and literature features.

The Daves era of Vogue came to an end in 1962, when Diana Vreeland joined the magazine (first as an associate editor, and then, following Daves's departure in December 1962, as editor-in-chief). The pair had opposing approaches to editing Vogue,. Critics said that this led the magazine to a period of "extravagance, and luxury and excess". Under Vreeland, the magazine began to appeal to the youth of the sexual revolution by focusing on contemporary fashion and editorial features that openly discussed sexuality. Vogue extended coverage to include East Village boutiques, such as Limbo on St. Mark's Place, and featured of personalities like Andy Warhol's "Superstars". Vogue also continued making household names out of models, including Suzy Parker, Twiggy, Jean Shrimpton, Lauren Hutton, Veruschka, Marisa Berenson, Penelope Tree, and others.

In 1973, Vogue became a monthly publication. Under editor-in-chief Grace Mirabella, the magazine underwent extensive editorial and stylistic changes in response to changes of its target audience. Mirabella states that she was chosen in an effort to change Vogue, because "women weren't interested in reading about or buying clothes that served no purpose in their changing lives." She was selected to make the magazine appeal to "the free, working, "liberated" woman of the seventies. The magazine also took a different approach in terms of interviews, arts coverage, and articles. Later this stylistic change fell out of favor in the 1980s, Mirabella was fired.

Well-known fashion photographers for the magazine include:

- Erwin Blumenfeld (1897–1969)
- Cecil Beaton (1904–1980)
- Horst P. Horst (1906–1999)
- Regina Relang (1906–1989)
- Norman Parkinson (1913–1990)
- Irving Penn (1917–2009)
- Henry Clarke (1917–1996)
- Helmut Newton (1920–2004)
- Francesco Scavullo (1921–2004)
- Richard Avedon (1923–2004)
- Patrick Demarchelier (1943–2022)
- Peter Lindbergh (1944–2019)
- Stan Malinowski (1936–2024)
- Herb Ritts (1952–2002)
- Ellen von Unwerth (1954)
- Corinne Day (1962–2010)

=== 1988–2025: Anna Wintour leadership ===
In July 1988, with Vogue losing readership and advertising to its rival Elle, Anna Wintour was named editor-in-chief. Noted for her trademark bob cut and sunglasses, Wintour attempted to revitalize the brand by making it feel younger and more approachable; she directed the focus towards new and accessible concepts of "fashion" for a wider audience. Wintour's influence allowed the magazine to maintain its high circulation with staff introducing new trends that a broader audience could conceivably afford.

Throughout her reign at Vogue, Wintour accomplished her goals to revitalize the magazine and oversaw production of some of its largest editions in terms of length. The September 2012 edition measured 916 pages, which was the highest ever for a monthly magazine.

The contrast of Wintour's vision with that of her predecessors was noted as striking by observers, both critics and defenders. Amanda Fortini, fashion and style contributor for Slate, argues that her policy has been beneficial for Vogue, delivering it from what some critics had termed its boring "beige years". {{blockquote| Among Condé Nast executives there was worry that the grand dame of fashion publications was losing ground to Elle, which in just three years had reached a paid circulation of 851,000, compared to Vogue's 1.2 million. Thus, Condé Nast publisher Si Newhouse brought in the 38-year-old Wintour, who, through the editor-in-chief positions at British Vogue and House & Garden had become known not only for her cutting-edge visual sense, but also for her ability to radically revamp a magazine—to shake things up. Although she has had a strong impact on the magazine, Wintour has been pinned as being cold and difficult to work with.

In early 2024, Vogue magazine appointed Raul Martinez as global creative director. The appointment marks Martinez's return to Vogue from Victoria’s Secret where he had previously held the role the since 2021.As the creative director, he reported to Wintour and oversaw the direction of the magazine globally and its visual approach.

In June 2025 it was announced that Wintour would be stepping down from her position as editor-in-chief. She currently retains her roles as Chief Content Officer and Global Editorial Director at Condé Nast, while the editor-in-chief position at Vogue was replaced by/renamed Head of Editorial Content.

In September 2025, it was announced that Chloe Malle would succeed Wintour but in the role of Head of Editorial Content. Malle was first listed on the masthead of the October 2025 issue which featured Kendall Jenner and Gigi Hadid on the cover. However, the last issue that Wintour oversaw was December 2025 (featuring Timothée Chalamet on the cover) and Malle's first issue 'Spring 2026' was released in February 2026.

=== 2025–present: Chloe Malle ===
In September 2025, Chloe Malle was announced as Anna Wintour's successor. It was announced that Chloe Malle would take on the title of Head of Editorial Content and Anna Wintour would take on the title of Global Editorial Director as well as Global Chief Content Officer and Artistic Director at Condé Nast (parent company of Vogue).

== Features ==
=== Noteworthy Vogue covers ===
- December 17, 1892: The magazine's first cover features a debutante at her début.
- May 13, 1893: The first cover with a photograph, Countess Divonne (née, Florence Audenried) by an unknown photographer
- July 1, 1932: The first cover with a color photograph, featuring Edward Steichen's image of a swimmer holding a beach ball.
- August 15, 1933: The cover features model Toto Koopman who is both bisexual and biracial. She portrays a woman whom readers during the Great Depression would dream of being like.
- November 15, 1943: 50th Anniversary cover featuring Marilyn Ambrose reading the first issue of Vogue, photo by John Rawlings
- September 15, 1944: Feature 'USA Tent Hospital in France', Lee Miller as a war correspondent for Vogue.
- May 1961: Sophia Loren covers the magazine and is one of the first entertainers to do so.
- August 1974: Beverly Johnson becomes the first black woman to cover American Vogue.
- November 1988: Anna Wintour's first cover features Israeli model Michaela Bercu.
- May 1989: Under Wintour's control, Madonna became the first singer to be featured on the cover of Vogue, something that was considered "controversial," after a long-standing focus on models on their covers.
- April 1992: Vogue's 100th anniversary cover featuring 10 supermodels namely Naomi Campbell, Cindy Crawford, Linda Evangelista, Christy Turlington, Tatjana Patitz, Karen Mulder, Yasmeen Ghauri, Niki Taylor, Elaine Irwin, & Claudia Schiffer, and is the highest-selling issue ever.
- November 1992: Richard Gere becomes the first male to appear on the cover, alongside his then-wife Cindy Crawford.
- December 1998: Hillary Clinton becomes the first American First Lady to cover the magazine.
- September 2012: Lady Gaga graced the cover of the largest edition of Vogue in history, weighing in at 4.5 pounds and 916 pages.
- April 2014: Kim Kardashian and Kanye West appeared on one of Vogue's most controversial cover shoots. Kardashian is the first reality television star on the cover, and West is the first rapper. They are also the first interracial couple to appear on the magazine cover.
- August 2017: Zayn Malik (alongside Gigi Hadid) appears on the cover, making him the first Muslim man to be featured on the magazine's cover
- September 2018: Beyoncé is given "unprecedented" total editorial control of the magazine's cover and feature. She hires 23-year-old black photographer Tyler Mitchell to shoot the cover, making him the first black photographer to shoot a cover for Vogue in its 126-year history.
- December 2020: Harry Styles becomes the first male to appear by himself on the cover of Vogue.
- February 2021: Kamala Harris becomes the first vice president to cover Vogue. She is the highest-ranking female elected official in U.S. history, and the first African American and first Asian-American vice president.
- November 2021: Adele becomes the first person to cover the American and British editions of Vogue simultaneously.
- February 2022: Hoyeon Jung becomes the first Asian to appear by herself on the cover of Vogue.
- August 2022: Emma Corrin becomes the first non-binary person to cover Vogue.
- January 2025: Angel Reese becomes the first basketball player to be on the cover of Vogue.
- May 2026: Anna Wintour (alongside Meryl Streep) becomes the first editor-in-chief to appear on the cover of Vogue.

In 2020, the hashtag #VogueChallenge became a popular social media meme in response to the perceived lack of diversity on Vogue's front covers. Users of various ages and ethnicities uploaded photos of re-creating famous Vogue covers as part of a campaign to promote variety in fashion.

=== Men on the covers ===
Eighteen male cover models have been featured on the American edition:

- Richard Gere, with Cindy Crawford in November 1992
- George Clooney, with Gisele Bündchen in June 2000
- Auden McCaw, with his mother Amber Valletta in July 2002
- LeBron James, with Gisele Bündchen in April 2008
- Ryan Lochte, with Hope Solo and Serena Williams in June 2012
- Kanye West, with Kim Kardashian in April 2014
- Ben Stiller, with Penélope Cruz in February 2016
- Ashton Eaton, with Gigi Hadid in August 2016
- Zayn Malik, with Gigi Hadid in August 2017
- Justin Bieber, with Hailey Baldwin in March 2019
- Harry Styles, in December 2020
- A$AP Rocky, Colman Domingo, Lewis Hamilton, Pharrell Williams, in May 2025
- Timothée Chalamet, in December 2025
- Homer Gere, with Kaia Gerber, in September 2026
- Michael B. Jordan, in October 2026

=== Healthy body initiative ===
May 2013 marked the first anniversary of a healthy body initiative that was signed by the magazine's international editors—the initiative represents a commitment from the editors to promote positive body images within the content of Vogue's numerous editions. Vogue Australia editor Edwina McCann explained:

In the magazine we're moving away from those very young, very thin girls. A year down the track, we ask ourselves what can Vogue do about it? And an issue like this [June 2013 issue] is what we can do about it. If I was aware of a girl being ill on a photo shoot I wouldn't allow that shoot to go ahead, or if a girl had an eating disorder I would not shoot her.

Jonathan Newhouse, Condé Nast International chairman, states that "Vogue editors around the world want the magazines to reflect their commitment to the health of the models who appear on the pages and the wellbeing of their readers." Alexandra Shulman, one of the magazine's editor, comments on the initiative by stating "as one of the fashion industry's most powerful voices, Vogue has a unique opportunity to engage with relevant issues where we feel we can make a difference."

== Style and influence ==
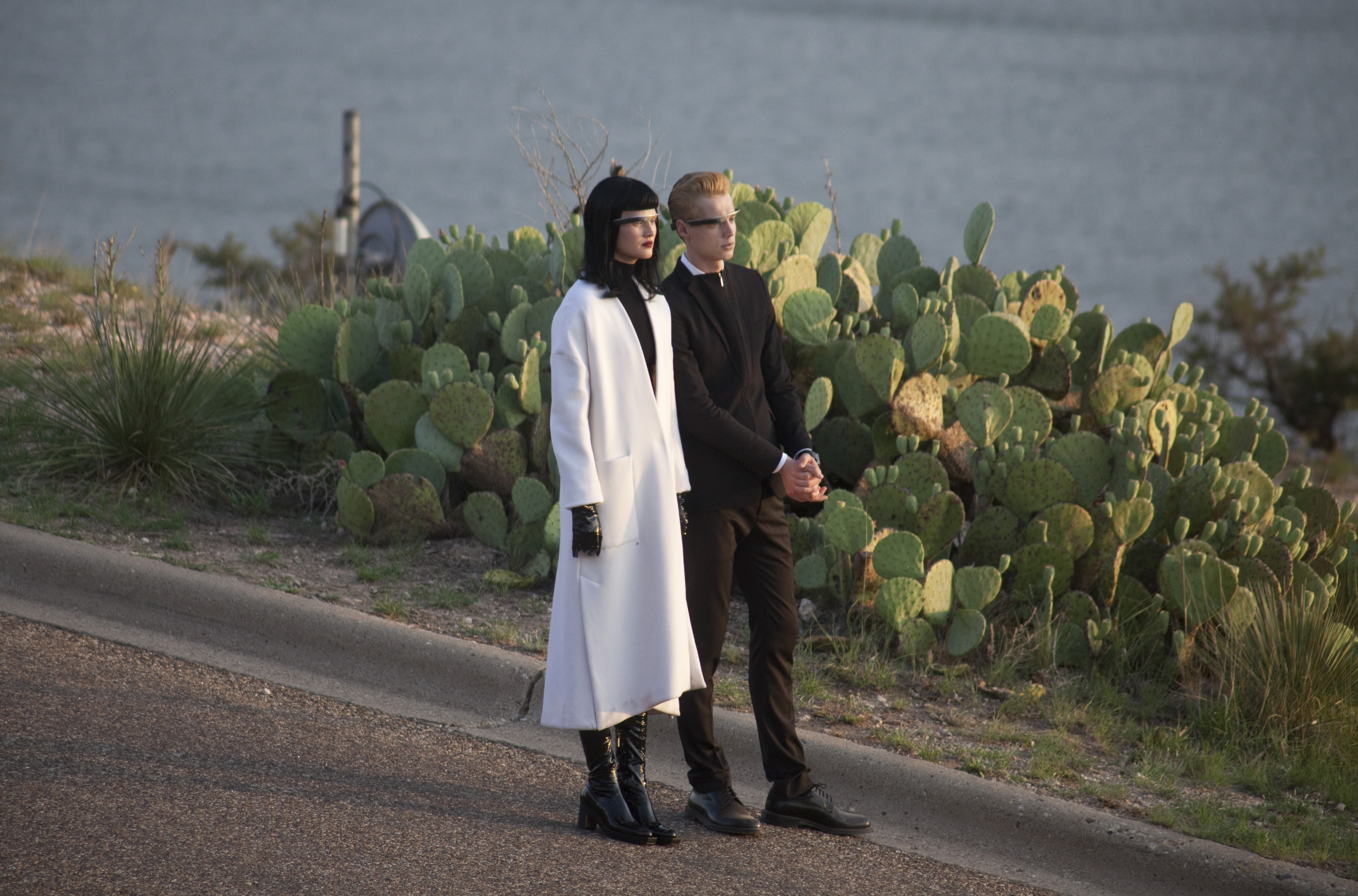
Models Toni Garrn and brother Niklas Garrn wearing Google Glass during the 2013 September issue fashion photo shoot in Ransom Canyon, Texas in June 2013

The word vogue means "fashion" in French. Vogue was described by book critic Caroline Weber in a December 2006 edition of The New York Times as "the world's most influential fashion magazine": The publication claims to reach 11 million readers in the US and 12.5 million internationally. Furthermore, Anna Wintour was described as one of the most powerful figures in fashion.

=== Technological ===
Google partnered with Vogue to feature Google Glass in the September 2013 issue, which featured a 12-page spread. Chris Dale, who manages communications for the Glass team at Google, stated:

The Vogue September issue has become a cultural touchstone ahead of New York's Fashion Week. Seeing Glass represented so beautifully in this issue is a huge thrill for the entire Glass team.

In the September 2015 issue, technology such as Apple Music, Apple Watch, and Amazon Fashion were all featured within the issue's 832 pages.

=== Economic ===
Wintour's "Fashion Night" initiative was launched in 2009 with the intention of kickstarting the economy following the 2008 financial crisis by drawing people back into the retail environment and donating proceeds to various charitable causes. The yearly event was co-hosted by Vogue in 27 cities around the US and 15 countries worldwide and included online retailers at the beginning of 2011. Debate occurred over the actual profitability of the events in the US resulting in a potentially permanent hiatus in 2013; however, the event continued in 19 other locations internationally.

It has been stated that Vogue has the ability to lift the spirits of readers during tough times and that "even in bad times, someone is up for a good time" and that Vogue "make[s] money because they elevate the eye and sometimes the spirit, take the reader someplace special." These fantasy tomes feel a boost during economic distress—like liquor and ice cream and movie ticket sales."

=== Political ===
In 2006, Vogue acknowledged salient political and cultural issues by featuring burqas as well as articles on prominent Muslim women, their approach to fashion, and the effect of different cultures on fashion and women's lives. Vogue also sponsored the "Beauty Without Borders" initiative with a US$25,000 donation that was used to establish a cosmetology school for Afghan women. Wintour stated: "Through the school, we could not only help women in Afghanistan to look and feel better but also give them employment." A documentary by Liz Mermin, entitled The Beauty Academy of Kabul, which highlighted the proliferation of Western standards of beauty, criticized the school suggesting that "the beauty school could not be judged a success if it did not create a demand for American cosmetics."

Leading up to the 2012 US presidential election, Wintour used her industry clout to host several significant fundraising events in support of the Obama campaign. The first, in 2010, was a dinner with an estimated US$30,000 entry fee. The "Runway To Win" initiative recruited prominent designers to create pieces to support the campaign.

In October 2016, the magazine stated that it endorsed Hillary Clinton for president of the United States. This was the first time that the magazine supported as a single voice a presidential candidate in its 120 years of history.

=== Social ===
The Met Gala is an annual event that is hosted by Vogue to celebrate the opening of the Metropolitan Museum's fashion exhibit. The Met Gala is the most coveted event of the year in the field of fashion and is attended by A-list celebrities, politicians, designers and fashion editors. Vogue has hosted the themed event since 1971 under editor-in-chief Diana Vreeland. Since 1995, Wintour has served as chairwoman of the Met Gala and is the woman behind the coveted event's top-secret guest list. In 2013, Vogue released a special edition entitled Vogue Special Edition: The Definitive Inside Look at the 2013 Met Gala.

Vogue and Wintour have long been criticized by animal rights organizations like PETA for promoting the use of real animal fur and defending the fur industry. In October 2025, following a campaign by the Coalition to Abolish the Fur Trade, Condé Nast announced that it would no longer feature new animal fur in its editorial content or advertising, including in Vogue, Vanity Fair, and GQ.

=== Music ===
In 2015, Vogue listed their "15 Roots Reggae Songs You Should Know". In an interview with Patricia Chin of VP Records, Vogue highlighted an abbreviated list of early "reggae royalty" who has recorded at Studio 17 in Kingston, Jamaica which included Bob Marley, Peter Tosh, Gregory Isaacs, Dennis Brown, Burning Spear, Toots and the Maytals, The Heptones, and Bunny Wailer.

In addition to their coverage of historically significant artists, Vogue has been a source for contemporary music news, including regarding artists such as Jay-Z, Eminem, Tom Petty, and Taylor Swift, as well as introducing new artists to the scene such as Suzi Analogue in 2017.

== Criticism ==
As Wintour came to personify the magazine's image, both she and Vogue drew critics. Wintour's one-time assistant at the magazine, Lauren Weisberger, wrote a roman à clef entitled The Devil Wears Prada. Published in 2003, the novel became a bestseller and was adapted as a film in 2006. The central character resembled Weisberger and the story encompasses her relationship with a powerful editor-in-chief of a fictionalized version of Vogue. The novel portrays a magazine ruled by "the Antichrist and her coterie of fashionistas, who exist on cigarettes, Diet Dr Pepper, and mixed green salads", according to a review in The New York Times. The editor is described by Weisberger as being "an empty, shallow, bitter woman who has tons and tons of gorgeous clothes and not much else".

However, despite the slight hit at the defamation of Wintour and Vogue magazine in general, the image of both editor and high-class magazine were not diminished. The success of both the novel and the film brought new attention from a wide global audience to the power and glamour of the magazine and the industry it continues to lead.

In 2007, Vogue drew criticism from the anti-smoking group "Campaign for Tobacco-Free Kids" for carrying tobacco advertisements in the magazine. The group claims that volunteers sent the magazine more than 8,000 protest emails or faxes regarding the ads. The group also claimed that in response they received scribbled notes faxed back on letters that had been addressed to Wintour stating, "Will you stop? You're killing trees!" In response, a spokesperson for Condé Nast released an official statement: "Vogue does carry tobacco advertising. Beyond that we have no further comment."

In April 2008,Vogue featured a cover photo by photographer Annie Leibovitz of Gisele Bündchen and the basketball player LeBron James. This was the third time that Vogue featured a male on the cover of the American issue (the other two men were actors George Clooney and Richard Gere) and the first in which the man was black. Some observers criticized the cover as a prejudicial depiction of James because his pose with Bündchen was reminiscent of a poster for the film King Kong. Further criticism arose when the website Watching the Watchers analyzed the photo alongside the World War I recruitment poster titled Destroy This Mad Brute. However, James reportedly liked the cover shoot.

In February 2011, just before the 2011 Syrian protests unfolded, Vogue published a controversial piece by Joan Juliet Buck about Asma al-Assad, wife of the Syrian president Bashar al-Assad. A number of journalists criticized the article as glossing over the poor human rights record of Bashar al-Assad. According to reports, the Syrian government paid the U.S. lobbying firm Brown Lloyd James US$5,000 per month to arrange for and manage the article.

In October 2018, Vogue published a photoshoot starring Kendall Jenner who had an afro-like style hairstyle which drew criticisms.

In 2020, the hashtag #VogueChallenge became a popular social media meme in response to the perceived lack of diversity on Vogue's front covers. Users of various ages and ethnicities uploaded photos of re-creating famous Vogue covers as part of a campaign to promote diversity in fashion.

In July 2025, the magazine was criticised for a Guess advertisement made by AI.

== Media ==
=== Documentaries ===
In 2009, the feature-length documentary The September Issue was released; it was an inside view of the production of the record-breaking September 2007 issue of U.S. Vogue, directed by R. J. Cutler. The film was shot over eight months as Wintour prepared the issue, and included testy exchanges between Wintour and her creative director Grace Coddington. The issue became the largest ever published at the time; over 5 pounds in weight and 840 pages in length, a world record for a monthly magazine. That record has been broken by Vogue's September 2012 issue, which came in at 916 pages.

Also in 2012, HBO released a documentary entitled In Vogue: The Editor's Eye, in conjunction with the 120th anniversary of the magazine. Drawing on Vogue's extensive archives, the film featured behind-the-scenes interviews with longtime Vogue editors, including Wintour, Coddington, Tonne Goodman, Babs Simpson, Hamish Bowles, and Phyllis Posnick. Celebrated subjects and designers in the fashion industry, such as Nicole Kidman, Sarah Jessica Parker, Linda Evangelista, Vera Wang, and Marc Jacobs, also appear in the film. The editors share personal stories about collaborating with top photographers, such as Leibovitz, and the various day-to-day responsibilities and interactions of a fashion editor at Vogue. The film was directed and produced by Fenton Bailey and Randy Barbato. In October 2012, Vogue also released a book titled Vogue: The Editor's Eye to complement the documentary.

=== Video channel ===
In 2013, Vogue launched the Vogue video channel that can be accessed via their website. The channel was launched in conjunction with Conde Nast's multi-platform media initiative. Mini-series that have aired on the video channel include Vogue Weddings, The Monday Makeover, From the Vogue Closet, Fashion Week, Elettra's Goodness, Jeanius, Vintage Bowles, The Backstory, Beauty Mark, Met Gala, Voguepedia, Vogue Voices, Vogue Diaries, CFDA/Vogue Fashion Fund, and Monday's with Andre. Current video series on the channel include "73 Questions", featuring celebrities from Sarah Jessica Parker to Bad Bunny, and "Beauty Secrets", sharing makeup how-tos from models, actors, and unexpected personalities like Martha Stewart.

=== Books ===
Books published by Vogue include In Vogue: An Illustrated History of the World's Most Famous Fashion Magazine, Vogue: The Covers, Vogue: The Editor's Eye, Vogue Living: House, Gardens, People, The World in Vogue, Vogue Weddings: Brides, Dresses, Designers, Nostalgia in Vogue, and "The United States of Fashion: A New Atlas of American Style"

=== Voguepedia ===
Launched in 2011 by Condé Nast Digital, Voguepedia is a fashion encyclopedia that also includes an archive of every issue of Vogue's American edition since 1892. Only Vogue staff are permitted to contribute to the encyclopedia, unlike the VogueEncyclo—hosted by Vogue Italia—that receives contributions from anyone. As of May 9, 2013, the site was not fully functional; code still showed in search results and only certain search terms yielded results.

=== Website ===
Vogue has also created an easily navigable website that includes six different content categories for viewers to explore. The website includes an archive with issues from 1892 forward for those whom subscribe for the website. The magazines online are the same as those that were printed in that time and are not cut or shortened from the original content.

=== Podcast ===
Vogue launched the teaser for its podcast series on September 10, 2015. The magazine announced that star André Leon Talley would host the podcasts, and the inaugural twenty-one-minute podcast was released on September 14, 2015, featuring Anna Wintour. Talley commented that he had "been a longtime storyteller at Vogue and it's just another format for telling stories—as at Vogue, we love to tell the story of style, fashion, and what is absolutely a part of the culture at the moment", hence why the magazine has decided to create podcasts.

=== Vogue App ===
The app was introduced on April 26, 2016, as a way for the magazine to become more mobile friendly. The Vogue app displays content on mobile devices and gives people the ability to view the magazine content wherever they go. The app has new content every day and people can choose to receive content recommended just for their taste. In addition, the app allows one to save stories for later and or read offline. Lastly, the app provides notifications for fashion outbreaks and for new stories that are published pertaining to that viewer's particular taste.

=== Vogue Business ===
The online fashion industry publication was launched in January 2019. The new property aims at offering a global perspective on the fashion industry with industry insights. Although sharing the Vogue brand name, Vogue Business is operated as a separate business entity with an independent editorial team. In June 2019, Vogue Business launched the Vogue Business Talent, a platform that promotes vacancies from international fashion brands and companies with the goal to match professionals with their job opportunities.

== Other editions ==
Vogue Knitting (1932–1969)
Judy Brittain		
Ruth Seder Cooke		
Helen Catchings Murray		1962 or 1963
Patricia Boyle	1962 or 1963	1969
Vogue Knitting (1982–present)
Carla Scott		
Trisha Malcolm		
Norah Gaughan	2020	present
Teen Vogue (2003–present)
Amy Astley	2002	2016
Elaine Welteroth	2016	2018
Lindsay Peoples Wagner	2018	2021
Alexi McCammond	2021	2021
Versha Sharma	2021	2025
Chloe Malle	2025	present
Men's Vogue (2005–2009)
Jay Fielden	2005	2009
Vogue Living (2006–2008)
Hamish Bowles	2006	2008

In 2005, Condé Nast launched Men's Vogue. The magazine ceased publication as an independent publication in October 2008, the December/January 2009 edition being its last issue. It was intended to be published as a supplement of Vogue, the Spring 2009 edition being the last issue of the magazine altogether.

Condé Nast also publishes Teen Vogue, a version of the magazine for teenage girls in the United States.

Until 1961, Vogue was also the publisher of Vogue Patterns, a home sewing pattern company. It was sold to Butterick Publishing, which also licensed the Vogue name.

=== Vogue Living ===
Vogue Living is published for Australia (since late 1967), Brazil (as Casa Vogue, since May 1975), the Netherlands (since April 2016), Hong Kong (since 2020), Poland (since May 2022), Adria (since April 2025), Scandinavia (since October 2025), and Singapore (since October 2026). It was previously published in Italy as Casa Vogue from 1968 to 2021 and in the United States from 2006 to 2008.

== International editions ==
As of 2026, 28 international editions of Vogue are in operation around the world (29, including the U.S. edition), 4 have ceased publication, and 1 is set to launch.

=== British Vogue ===
British Vogue was launched in 1916 by Condé Nast and aimed to link together fashion and high society.

=== Vogue France ===
Vogue France is the French edition of Vogue and formerly called Vogue Paris from its inception in 1920 until 2021.

=== Vogue Spanish Edition ===
Vogue Spanish Edition was published from 1918 to 1923. The magazine was based in Havana, Cuba and distributed across Spain and Latin America, under the editorship of Hugh C. Barr. The demise of Vogue Spanish Edition was due to the failure of communicating the "quality and class" of the other Vogues to Spanish-speaking readers, as Cuban Spanish was considered as an "inferior" form of the language.

=== Vogue Deutsch ===
Francis L. Wurzburg (Vice President of Condé Nast) was the first to propose the idea of a German Vogue (later nicknamed ''Grog''), to the dis-approval of Vogue editor-in-chief Edna Woolman Chase who believed that Germans had no taste. However, Condé and Wurzburg believed that was a justification for the start of German Vogue, to introduce good taste to smart German women. Walter Maas was put in charge of the magazines launch and an office was opened on Berlin's Kurfürstendamm. Dr. Hans Leonhard Hammerbacher was appointed to the role of managing director, Dr. Lothar Mohrenwitz to that of editor-in-chief, and Mehemed Fehmy Agha of the Dorland Advertising Agency, became art director of German Vogue.

The first issue of German Vogue appeared on newsstands across Germany, Austria, and Hungary in April 1928. All copies of the magazine sold out within forty-eight hours. However due to raging inflation in Germany, the disillusion of the German woman to news of fashion and society from New York City, London, and Paris, along with Hammerbach's extravagant spending, German Vogue would cease publication to a loss of $300,000 just before the Wall Street crash of 1929.

In 1979, German Vogue relaunched as Vogue Deutsch. In December 2020, it was announced that Christiane Arp will exit Vogue Germany after 17 years, after joining the title in 2003. In October 2021, Kerstin Weng was announced as the magazine's Head of Editorial Content.

=== Vogue New Zealand ===
In 1955, British Vogue launched a supplement for New Zealand. In 1957, the magazine was launched no longer as a supplement but as its own independent edition; however, it was still edited from London. Rosemary Cooper served as editor during the London-based years, Cooper also oversaw the supplements of British Vogue for Australia and South Africa/Rhodesia.

In the magazine's early years, its focus was on Britain with readers being encouraged to use British materials, New Zealand clothing would even be flown out to be photographed in English settings.

However, in 1961, when Joan Chesney Frost was appointed editor of Vogue Australia and Vogue New Zealand, the magazine's production was moved to Sydney. Under her leadership, the clothes began being photographed in New Zealand (however, until the mid 1960s, most photoshoots were in Australia). In 1962, Frost resigned and Sheila Scotter was appointed editor. Marie Stuttard (who became the first NZ-based fashion editor of the magazine in 1961) said in a 1983 interview "We were able to choose our own clothes for photography, but they had to tie in with the trends as dictated by the organisation overseas. That was the guiding light. Whatever we did had to be approved by Australia." Under Scotter's leadership, Michal McKay became fashion and beauty editor (replacing Stuttard in 1964); she later became the editor-in-chief of Vogue Singapore in the 1990s.

The magazine also incorporated House & Garden from 1962.

In 1968, after over 10 years, the magazine ceased publication with Condé Nast deciding that the New Zealand market was too small for a Vogue.

=== Vogue South Africa ===
A South African edition operated from 1958 to 1966, an offshoot of British Vogue similar to how Vogue New Zealand and later Vogue Australia were launched.

=== Vogue Brasil ===
The Brazilian edition of Vogue was launched in 1975.

=== Vogue Argentina ===
The magazine was launched in May 1980, published by Carta Editorial who also launched Vogue Brasil and Vogue México.

=== Vogue España ===
Vogue España was then launched in 1981 and edited from Paris, however it quickly ceased publication.

In 1988, the magazine was relaunched with Cindy Crawford on the cover and has been in continuous operation since. On January 11, 2017, it was announced that Eugenia de la Torriente will become the new editor-in-chief. In December 2020, it was announced that de la Torriente will step down from the magazine after three years. In September 2021, Inés Lorenzo was announced as the magazine's Head of Editorial Content.

=== Vogue Korea ===
Vogue Korea launched in 1996. It is published by Doosan Magazine, a Doosan Group company.

=== Vogue Japan ===
The magazine, launched as Vogue Nippon in 1999. In 2011 the magazine was rebranded from Vogue Nippon to Vogue Japan. In May 2021, it was announced that Mitsuko Watanabe would exit Vogue Japan at the end of the year, after thirteen years as the editor-in-chief. In January 2022, Tiffany Godoy was announced as the magazine's Head of Editorial Content.

=== Vogue Portugal ===
Vogue Portugal launched in 2002.

=== Vogue Türkiye ===
Vogue Türkiye was launched in 2010.

=== Vogue Thailand ===
The magazine was launched in 2013. The first issue of the magazine sold-out. Editor-in-chief, Kullawit Laosuksri was the only male editor at the helm of Vogue at the time.

=== Vogue CS ===
Vogue CS (short for Czechoslovakia) was launched in 2018. In February 2018, the Czech-language edition was announced. It premiered in August 2018 under license with V24 Media, and titled Vogue CS, it covers the Czech and Slovak markets.

=== Vogue Hong Kong ===
Vogue Hong Kong was launched in 2019. In October 2018, the Hong Kong edition was announced. It premiered on March 3, 2019, under a license agreement with Rubicon Media Ltd., with digital and print presence.

=== Vogue Philippines ===
It was announced in January 2022 that Condé Nast would partner with Philippines-based publishing company Mega Global Licensing to launch a Philippine Vogue. Bea Valdes was appointed editor-in-chief, Pam Quiñones as the fashion director. and Rhoda Campos-Aldanese as publisher. Valdes was known for her accessory line and Quiñones previously worked as editor-in-chief of L'Officiel Manila.

Apo Whang-Od became the oldest Vogue cover model when she was featured on the April 2023 cover at 106 years of age.

A men's edition (Vogue Man Philippines) was launched in 2024 as a section in the magazine then as a separate publication from June. Danyl Geneciran was appointed editor, previously Geneciran served as editor-in-chief of L'Officiel Philippines.

=== Vogue Romania ===
In April 2026 it was announced that a Romanian edition of Vogue will launch in Spring 2027. The magazine is to be published six times per year, in a licensing agreement with Aemme.

=== Vogue Vietnam ===
In October 2026 it was announced that Vogue Vietnam will launch in 2027.

== Editors of international editions ==
The following highlights circulation dates as well as individuals who have served as editor-in-chief of international editions of Vogue:

Countries/editions	Circulation Dates	Editor-in-Chief	Start year	End year
United Kingdom (British Vogue)	1916–present	Elspeth Champcommunal	1916	1922
United Kingdom (British Vogue)	1916–present	Dorothy Todd	1923	1926
United Kingdom (British Vogue)	1916–present	Alison Settle	1926	1934
United Kingdom (British Vogue)	1916–present	Elizabeth Penrose	1935	1939
United Kingdom (British Vogue)	1916–present	Audrey Withers	1940	1961
United Kingdom (British Vogue)	1916–present	Ailsa Garland	1961	1964
United Kingdom (British Vogue)	1916–present	Beatrix Miller	1964	1984
United Kingdom (British Vogue)	1916–present	Anna Wintour	1985	1987
United Kingdom (British Vogue)	1916–present	Liz Tilberis	1988	1992
United Kingdom (British Vogue)	1916–present	Alexandra Shulman	1992	2017
United Kingdom (British Vogue)	1916–present	Edward Enninful	2017	2023
United Kingdom (British Vogue)	1916–present	Chioma Nnadi	2023	present
France (Vogue France) (Note: As Vogue Paris till 2021)	1920–present	edited from the USA	1920	1922
France (Vogue France)	1920–present	Cosette Vogel	1922	1927
France (Vogue France)	1920–present	Main Bocher	1927	1929
France (Vogue France)	1920–present	Michel de Brunhoff	1929	1954
France (Vogue France)	1920–present	Edmonde Charles-Roux	1954	1966
France (Vogue France)	1920–present	Françoise de Langlade	1966	1968
France (Vogue France)	1920–present	Francine Crescent	1968	1986
France (Vogue France)	1920–present	Colombe Pringle	1987	1994
France (Vogue France)	1920–present	Joan Juliet Buck	1994	2001
France (Vogue France)	1920–present	Carine Roitfeld	2001	2010
France (Vogue France)	1920–present	Emmanuelle Alt	2011	2021
France (Vogue France)	1920–present	Eugénie Trochu	2021	2024
France (Vogue France)	1920–present	Claire Thomson-Jonville	2025	present
Germany (Vogue Deutsch)	1928–1929	Lothar Mohrenwitz	1928	1929
Germany (Vogue Deutsch)	1979–present	Christa Dowling	1979	1989
Germany (Vogue Deutsch)	1979–present	Angelica Blechschmidt	1989	2003
Germany (Vogue Deutsch)	1979–present	Christiane Arp	2003	2021
Germany (Vogue Deutsch)	1979–present	Kerstin Weng	2021	present
New Zealand (Vogue New Zealand)	1957–1968	Rosemary Cooper	1957	1961
New Zealand (Vogue New Zealand)	1957–1968	Joan Chesney Frost	1961	1962
New Zealand (Vogue New Zealand)	1957–1968	Sheila Scotter	1962	1968
South Africa (Vogue South Africa) (Note: As Vogue South Africa & Rhodesia till 1958, under that title it was distributed in Southern Rhodesia)	1958–1966	Rosemary Cooper		
South Africa (Vogue South Africa)	1958–1966	Mary McFadden	1964	1966
Australia (Vogue Australia)	1959–present	Rosemary Cooper	1959	1961
Australia (Vogue Australia)	1959–present	Joan Chesney Frost	1961	1962
Australia (Vogue Australia)	1959–present	Sheila Scotter	1962	1971
Australia (Vogue Australia)	1959–present	Eve Harman	1971	1976
Australia (Vogue Australia)	1959–present	June McCallum	1976	1989
Australia (Vogue Australia)	1959–present	Nancy Pilcher	1989	1997
Australia (Vogue Australia)	1959–present	Marion Hume	1997	1998
Australia (Vogue Australia)	1959–present	Juliet Ashworth	1998	1999
Australia (Vogue Australia)	1959–present	Kirstie Clements	1999	2012
Australia (Vogue Australia)	1959–present	Edwina McCann	2012	2023
Australia (Vogue Australia)	1959–present	Christine Centenera	2023	present
Italy (Vogue Italia) (Note: As Novita’ till 1965, Vogue Italia & Novita’ till 1966)	1964–present	Lidia Tabacchi	1964	1966
Italy (Vogue Italia)	1964–present	Franco Sartori	1966	1988
Italy (Vogue Italia)	1964–present	Franca Sozzani	1988	2016
Italy (Vogue Italia)	1964–present	Emanuele Farneti	2017	2021
Italy (Vogue Italia)	1964–present	Francesca Ragazzi	2021	present
Brazil (Vogue Brasil)	1975–present	Luis Carta	1975	1986
Brazil (Vogue Brasil)	1975–present	Andrea Carta	1986	2003
Brazil (Vogue Brasil)	1975–present	Patrícia Carta	2003	2010
Brazil (Vogue Brasil)	1975–present	Daniela Falcão	2010	2016
Brazil (Vogue Brasil)	1975–present	Silvia Rogar	2017	2018
Brazil (Vogue Brasil)	1975–present	Paula Merlo	2018	2026
Brazil (Vogue Brasil)	1975–present	Maria Laura Neves	2026	present
Mexico (Vogue México)	1980–1995	Waldemar Verdugo Fuentes	1980	1985
Mexico (Vogue México)	1980–1995	Noé Agudo García	1986	1995
Mexico (Vogue México)	1999–present	Eva Hughes	2002	2012
Mexico (Vogue México)	1999–present	Kelly Talamas	2012	2016
Mexico (Vogue México)	1999–present	Karla Martínez de Salas	2016	2026
Mexico (Vogue México)	1999–present	Atenea Morales de la Cruz	2026	present
Argentina (Vogue Argentina)	1980–198?	Luis Carta	1980	
Spain (Vogue España)	1981–1983	Beatriz de Borbón, Duchess of Seville	1981	
Spain (Vogue España)	1981–1983	Jorge Tarditti		
Spain (Vogue España)	1988–present	Ana Puértolas	1988	1988
Spain (Vogue España)	1988–present	María Eugenia Alberti	1988	
Spain (Vogue España)	1988–present	Rachel Enríquez		
Spain (Vogue España)	1988–present	Mara Malibrán	1995	1997
Spain (Vogue España)	1988–present	Daniela Cattaneo	1997	2001
Spain (Vogue España)	1988–present	Yolanda Sacristán	2001	2017
Spain (Vogue España)	1988–present	Eugenia de la Torriente	2017	2020
Spain (Vogue España)	1988–present	Inés Lorenzo	2021	present
Singapore (Vogue Singapore)	1994–1997	Nancy Pilcher	1994	1995
Singapore (Vogue Singapore)	1994–1997	Michal McKay	1996	1997
Singapore (Vogue Singapore)	2020–present	Norman Tan	2020	2023
Singapore (Vogue Singapore)	2020–present	Desmond Lim	2023	present
South Korea (Vogue Korea)	1996–present	Myung-hee Lee (이명희)	1996	2016
South Korea (Vogue Korea)	1996–present	Kwang-ho Shin (신광호)	2016	present
Taiwan (Vogue Taiwan)	1996–present	Rosalie Huang	1996	2020
Taiwan (Vogue Taiwan)	1996–present	Leslie Sun (孫怡)	2020	present
Russia (Vogue Russia / Vogue Россия)	1998–2022	Aliona Doletskaya	1998	2010
Russia (Vogue Russia / Vogue Россия)	1998–2022	Victoria Davydova	2010	2018
Russia (Vogue Russia / Vogue Россия)	1998–2022	Masha Fedorova	2018	2021
Russia (Vogue Russia / Vogue Россия)	1998–2022	Ksenia Solovieva	2021	2022
Japan (Vogue Japan) (Note: As Vogue Nippon till 2011)	1999–present	Hiromi Sogo (十河 ひろ美)	1999	2001
Japan (Vogue Japan)	1999–present	Kazuhiro Saito (斎藤和弘)	2001	2008
Japan (Vogue Japan)	1999–present	Mitsuko Watanabe (渡辺 三津子)	2008	2022
Japan (Vogue Japan)	1999–present	Tiffany Godoy	2022	2025
Japan (Vogue Japan)	1999–present	Kazumi Asamura Hayashi (林香寿美)	2026	2026
Argentina, Chile, Colombia, Costa Rica, Dominican Republic, El Salvador, Guatemala, Honduras, Miami (USA), Nicaragua, Panama, Puerto Rico, Peru, Uruguay (Vogue Latinoamérica)	1999–present	Eva Hughes	2002	2012
Argentina, Chile, Colombia, Costa Rica, Dominican Republic, El Salvador, Guatemala, Honduras, Miami (USA), Nicaragua, Panama, Puerto Rico, Peru, Uruguay (Vogue Latinoamérica)	1999–present	Kelly Talamas	2012	2016
Argentina, Chile, Colombia, Costa Rica, Dominican Republic, El Salvador, Guatemala, Honduras, Miami (USA), Nicaragua, Panama, Puerto Rico, Peru, Uruguay (Vogue Latinoamérica)	1999–present	Karla Martínez de Salas	2016	2026
Argentina, Chile, Colombia, Costa Rica, Dominican Republic, El Salvador, Guatemala, Honduras, Miami (USA), Nicaragua, Panama, Puerto Rico, Peru, Uruguay (Vogue Latinoamérica)	1999–present	Atenea Morales de la Cruz	2026	present
Greece (Vogue Greece) (Note: As Vogue Hellas till 2012)	2000–2012	Elena Makri	2000	2012
Greece (Vogue Greece)	2019–present	Thaleia Karafyllidou	2018	2024
Greece (Vogue Greece)	2019–present	Elis Kiss	2024	present
Portugal (Vogue Portugal)	2002–present	Paula Mateus	2002	2017
Portugal (Vogue Portugal)	2002–present	Sofia Lucas	2017	present
China (服饰与美容 Vogue China)	2005–present	Angelica Cheung (张宇)	2005	2020
China (服饰与美容 Vogue China)	2005–present	Margaret Zhang (章凝)	2021	2024
China (服饰与美容 Vogue China)	2005–present	Rocco Liu (刘冲)	2024	present
India (Vogue India)	2007–present	Priya Tanna	2007	2021
India (Vogue India)	2007–present	Megha Kapoor	2021	2023
India (Vogue India)	2007–present	Rochelle Pinto	2023	present
Turkey (Vogue Türkiye)	2010–present	Seda Domaniç	2010	2020
Turkey (Vogue Türkiye)	2010–present	Zeynep Yapar	2020	2020
Turkey (Vogue Türkiye)	2010–present	Debora Zakuto	2020	2025
Turkey (Vogue Türkiye)	2010–present	Zeynep Akdoğan	2025	present
Netherlands (Vogue Netherlands / Vogue NL)	2012–2021	Karin Sweerink	2012	2019
Netherlands (Vogue Netherlands / Vogue NL)	2012–2021	Rinke Tjepkema	2019	2021
Netherlands (Vogue Netherlands / Vogue NL)	2022–present	Yeliz Çiçek	2022	2024
Netherlands (Vogue Netherlands / Vogue NL)	2022–present	Linda Gümüs Gerritsen	2024	present
Thailand (Vogue Thailand)	2013–present	Kullawit Laosuksri	2013	present
Ukraine (Vogue Ukraine / Vogue UA)	2013–present	Masha Tsukanova	2013	2016
Ukraine (Vogue Ukraine / Vogue UA)	2013–present	Olga Sushko	2016	2018
Ukraine (Vogue Ukraine / Vogue UA)	2013–present	Philipp Vlasov	2019	2023
Ukraine (Vogue Ukraine / Vogue UA)	2013–present	Vena Brykalin	2023	present
Bahrain, Egypt, Jordan, Kuwait, Lebanon, Oman, Qatar, Saudi Arabia, United Arab Emirates (Vogue Arabia / Vogue العربية)	2017–present	Princess Deena Aljuhani Abdulaziz	2016	2017
Bahrain, Egypt, Jordan, Kuwait, Lebanon, Oman, Qatar, Saudi Arabia, United Arab Emirates (Vogue Arabia / Vogue العربية)	2017–present	Manuel Arnaut	2017	present
Poland (Vogue Polska)	2018–present	Filip Niedenthal	2017	2021
Poland (Vogue Polska)	2018–present	Ina Lekiewicz Levy	2021	present
Czech Republic, Slovakia (Vogue CS / Vogue Czechoslovakia)	2018–present	Andrea Běhounková	2018	2023
Czech Republic, Slovakia (Vogue CS / Vogue Czechoslovakia)	2018–present	Danica Kovárová	2023	2026
Czech Republic, Slovakia (Vogue CS / Vogue Czechoslovakia)	2018–present	Milena Zuravljova	2026	present
Hong Kong (Vogue Hong Kong)	2019–present	Peter Wong	2019	2020
Hong Kong (Vogue Hong Kong)	2019–present	Kat Yeung	2020	2022
Hong Kong (Vogue Hong Kong)	2019–present	Ahy Choi	2021	2023
Hong Kong (Vogue Hong Kong)	2019–present	Simon Au	2023	2026
Hong Kong (Vogue Hong Kong)	2019–present	Cherry Mui	2026	present
Denmark, Finland, Iceland, Norway, Sweden (Vogue Scandinavia)	2021–present	Martina Bonnier	2020	present
Philippines (Vogue Philippines)	2022–present	Bea Valdes	2022	2026
Philippines (Vogue Philippines)	2022–present	Trickie Lopa	2026	present
Bosnia and Herzegovina, Croatia, Montenegro, Serbia, Slovenia (Vogue Adria)	2024–present	Milan Đačić	2023	present
Romania (Vogue Romania)	2027–present	Andrei Morgan-Iovu	2026	present
Vietnam (Vogue Vietnam)	2027–present			

=== Head of Editorial Content ===
After a consolidation at Condé Nast, the publisher will put its largest titles (including Vogue) under global and regional leadership. The role of editor-in-chief is being replaced in some international editions for the new role of Head of Editorial Content.

Countries/editions	Circulation	Head of Editorial Content	Start year	End year	Regional Director	Global Director
France (Vogue France)	1920–present	Eugénie Trochu	2021	2024		Anna Wintour
France (Vogue France)	1920–present	Claire Thomson-Jonville	2025	present		Anna Wintour
Italy (Vogue Italia)	1964–present	Francesca Ragazzi	2021	present		Anna Wintour
Spain (Vogue España)	1988–present	Inés Lorenzo	2021	present		Anna Wintour
Germany (Vogue Deutsch)	1979–present	Kerstin Weng	2021	present		Anna Wintour
India (Vogue India)	2007–present	Megha Kapoor	2021	2023	Leslie Sun	Anna Wintour
India (Vogue India)	2007–present	Rochelle Pinto	2023	present	Leslie Sun	Anna Wintour
Japan (Vogue Japan)	1999–present	Tiffany Godoy	2022	2025	Leslie Sun	Anna Wintour
Japan (Vogue Japan)	1999–present	Kazumi Asamura Hayashi	2026	2026	Leslie Sun	Anna Wintour
Czech Republic, Slovakia (Vogue CS / Vogue Czechoslovakia)	2018–present	Danica Kovárová	2023	2026		Anna Wintour
Czech Republic, Slovakia (Vogue CS / Vogue Czechoslovakia)	2018–present	Milena Zuravljova	2026	present		Anna Wintour
United Kingdom (British Vogue)	1916–present	Chioma Nnadi	2024	present		Anna Wintour
Bahrain, Egypt, Jordan, Kuwait, Lebanon, Oman, Qatar, Saudi Arabia, United Arab Emirates (Vogue Arabia / Vogue العربية)	2017–present	Manuel Arnaut (Note: Prior to Condé Nast's acquisition of the magazine Arnaut was in the Editor-in-Chief role since 2017)	2025	present		Anna Wintour
United States (Vogue)	1896–present	Chloe Malle	2025	present		Anna Wintour
Mexico (Vogue México)	1980–1995; 1999–present	Atenea Morales de la Cruz	2026	present		Anna Wintour
Argentina, Chile, Colombia, Costa Rica, Dominican Republic, El Salvador, Guatemala, Honduras, Miami (USA), Nicaragua, Panama, Puerto Rico, Peru, Uruguay (Vogue Latinoamérica)	1999–present	Atenea Morales de la Cruz	2026	present		Anna Wintour

== See also ==
- The Big Four
- List of Vogue cover models
- Vogue World 2024
