= Arthur Baldwin Turnure =

American businessman who founded Vogue magazine

- Born: 1856; New York City, US
- Died: April 13, 1906 (aged 49); New York City, US
- Education: Princeton University
- Occupation: Businessman
- Known for: Vogue
- Spouse: Elizabeth Harrison (m. 1890)

Arthur Baldwin Turnure (1856–1906) was an American businessman who founded the fashion and lifestyle magazine Vogue. Turnure founded Vogue as a weekly newspaper in New York on December 17, 1892.

== Early life ==
Turnure was born to wealthy parents, David Mitchel Turnure and Mary S. Baldwin, in 1856. He graduated from Princeton University to become a lawyer in 1876. He later became an art director at Harper & Brothers.

On May 20, 1890 he married Elizabeth Harrison in New York City.

== Vogue ==
Turnure founded Vogue magazine on December 17, 1892 in New York. Condé Nast bought Vogue in 1909.

== Death ==
Turnure left his office feeling ill, and two days later he died of pneumonia. He died on April 13, 1906, at the age of 49, survived by his widow and young son.
