= Chioma Nnadi =

British fashion editor

Chioma Nnadi (/ˈtʃoʊmə ˈnɑːdiː/, born 1980 or 1981 in London) is a British fashion editor. She is head of editorial content of British Vogue as of 9 October 2023.

== Background ==
Nnadi was born and brought up in London. Her father was from Nigeria, and had come to the UK to study in the 1960s, and her mother was a Swiss-German nurse. She attended All Souls Primary School and then Manchester University. She worked at the magazines Trace and The Fader, having started her career at the Evening Standard newspaper, where she worked on the features desk for its sister magazine. In 2010, she joined Vogue in New York and latterly worked running the American website of Vogue as well as writing for the magazine and co-hosting the Vogue podcast. According to the magazine, Nnadi was able to substantially increase engagement and audience growth across social media platforms and the website. Since 2022, she co-hosts the Vogue podcast The Run-Through alongside American journalist Chloe Malle.

She is the first woman of colour to claim such a senior leadership role at Vogue globally, succeeding Edward Enninful who was the first gay man of colour assuming that position. Anna Wintour described Nnadi as "beloved among her colleagues at Vogue" and "an editor and writer with an impeccable reputation".
