= Jessica Daves =

American author and editor

- Born: February 20, 1898; Cartersville, Georgia
- Died: September 22, 1974 (aged 76); New York City
- Occupations: advertising executive, magazine editor, author
- Known for: edited Vogue magazine during an influential period
- Spouse: Robert Allerton Parker

Jessica Daves (February 20, 1898 – September 22, 1974) was an American writer and editor. She is best known for serving as the editor-in-chief of Vogue magazine, from 1952 to 1962.

== Biography ==
Daves was born in Cartersville, Georgia, in 1898, but moved to New York City, in 1921, where she worked in the advertising industry. She first started to work as a fashion merchandising editor at Vogue in 1933, and was promoted to managing editor in 1936. In 1952, she became editor-in-chief of Vogue and later retired in 1963.

She is distinctly known for the promotion of American ready-to-wear during her time at the magazine. A fashion writer noted, "She spotted the trend, and her major fashion impact was to make ready‐to‐wear chic."

She wrote or co-wrote three books: The Vogue Book of Menus, Ready‐Made Miracle: The Story of American Fashion for the 'Millions' and The World in Vogue. In 2019, fashion historian Rebecca Tuite published an account of her Vogue editorship,1950s in Vogue: The Jessica Daves Years, 1952-1962.

Media offices
Preceded by Edna Woolman Chase	Editor of American Vogue; 1952–1962	Succeeded by Diana Vreeland
