= Leslie Sun =

Fashion editor

Leslie Sun (born July 1, 1979) is APAC Editorial Director (Taiwan, India, Japan) for Vogue, and Editor-in-Chief for Vogue Taiwan.

== Early life ==
Born in Los Angeles and raised in Taiwan, Sun developed a passion for fashion at an early age. She studied at the University of Southern California, receiving her Bachelor’s in Business in 2001, and continued with a Master’s of Fine Art degree at California Institute of the Arts in 2006.

== Career ==
Sun began her career as a graphic designer at studio Green Dragon Office, specialising in museum catalogues and artist monographs. Sun returned to Taipei in 2012, where she opened her own lifestyle gallery, Sunset. In September 2019, Sun started working at Vogue Taiwan, where she became Editor-in-Chief in January 2020.

== Personal life ==
Sun collects contemporary art pieces from artists including Daniel Arsham, Wolfgang Tillmans, Mel Bochner, and Lin Yi-Hsuan, a hobby she began while studying at CalArts. Sun serves on the advisory board of Taipei Dangdai, a major art fair in Taiwan that launched in 2019.
