= David M. Granger =

American journalist

David M. Granger is an American journalist. He was editor-in-chief of Esquire Magazine from June 1997 until March 2016. Granger is a literary agent and media consultant working with Aevitas Creative Management.

== Education ==
Granger has a Master of Arts in English from the University of Virginia and a B.A. in English and History from the University of Tennessee. Granger also attended the Radcliffe Publishing Course.

== Early career ==
After moving to New York City in 1982, Granger's first foray into the magazine world was at Muppet Magazine as an editorial assistant. Granger also held positions at Family Weekly Magazine, Sport Magazine, Sports Inc. Magazine, Adweek, Mediaweek, as well as The National Sports Daily. Before becoming editor-in-chief at Esquire, Granger was the executive editor at GQ under editor-in-chief, Art Cooper, for nearly six years.

== Esquire ==
David Granger was named editor-in-chief of Esquire Magazine in June 1997 and served in that capacity until March 31, 2016, when he was replaced by (now former Esquire editor-in-chief) Jay Fielden. Granger got the job a year after writing to Cathie Black, then president of Hearst Magazines, with a plan to revive the flailing men's periodical. Under Granger, the magazine entered its most successful era. During his tenure, Esquire was a finalist for 72 National Magazine Awards, the industry's highest honors, and won 17. Many of the journalists Granger had established relationships with during his time at GQ followed him to Esquire and he was able to quickly build a troupe of award-winning, gritty staff writers that included Tom Chiarella, Scott Raab, Mike Sager, Chris Jones, Charlie Pierce, John H. Richardson, Cal Fussman, Lisa Taddeo, and Tom Junod.

=== Expanding the Limits of the Print Medium ===
Granger's Esquire career was punctuated by heights of innovation atypical to the print media industry. In the fall of 2008, Esquire created the first “moving cover” of a print magazine by embedding an electronic paper (E-Ink) display in the cover of its 75th anniversary issue. In December 2009, Esquire created the first ever Augmented Reality issue of a magazine. Esquire’s applications for the iPad were deemed groundbreaking and the magazine won the first-ever National Magazine Award for mobile editions in 2011. In December of 2012, Esquire partnered with Netpage to launch a proprietary phone application that allowed readers to share print content via e-mail or text and across all social networks.

In 2013, Esquire and NBCUniversal partnered to create the Esquire Network, a cable channel that was at its height in 70 million homes.

In 2015, in conjunction with the magazine’s 1000th issue, Esquire Classic (classic.esquire.com) was launched as a complete and living digital archive. To promote the archive a companion podcast series, “Esquire Classic", was created in partnership with PRX.

==== Other multi-disciplinary partnerships ====
- In the December 2006 issue, Esquire partnered with Droga5, the advertising agency, to create The Tap Project, a charitable initiative designed to benefit UNICEF’s clean-water charities. The initiative eventually became the umbrella for the bulk of UNICEF’s fundraising.
- In 2014, the magazine partnered with three different advertising agencies (72 and Sunny, Makeable and Barton F. Graf 9000), to create The Esquire Mentoring Initiative (mentoring.esquire.com).
- Also in 2014, Esquire partnered with Jefferson’s Reserve Bourbon to create The Esquire Manhattan, a premade, barrel-aged cocktail available in better bars and liquor stores.

=== Awards ===
Esquire was honored with numerous awards over Granger’s tenure.

- The magazine was a finalist for 72 National Magazine Awards and won 17.
- The Society of Publication Designers named Esquire Magazine of the Year in 2001 and it was a finalist for the award again in 2005, 2006, 2008 and 2010.
- It was listed as one of America’s Most Important Magazines, by the University of Missouri School of Journalism.

Granger has also received personal recognition for his magazine career:

- He was named the magazine industry’s Editor of the Year on three occasions: by Advertising Age in 2004; by Adweek in 2010 and again by AdAge in 2013.
- In 2012 he was awarded the Missouri Honor Medal by the University of Missouri School of Journalism for contributions to journalism.

After news of his firing from Esquire leaked, he received a standing ovation at the National Magazine Awards in 2016 as he walked up to the stage to receive the magazine's award.

Granger was set to receive the Magazine Editors' Hall of Fame Award on March 12, 2020 at the National Magazine Awards but the ceremony had to be postponed due to the COVID-19 pandemic.

== Agenting career ==
Granger is currently working as a literary agent and media consultant working with Aevitas Creative Management in New York City.

Current clients include:

- Andrew McCabe, former Deputy Director, FBI, whose The Threat (St. Martin’s, 2019) was a #1 New York Times bestseller. McCabe’s book vividly tells of his interactions with the current Presidential administration in the context of his 21-year career, a period during which the FBI transitioned from a law-enforcement entity to an intelligence agency focused on counter-terrorism.
- Julie Yip-Williams, whose posthumous The Unwinding of the Miracle (Random House, 2019), became a #6 NYT bestseller and was chosen as one of the NYT’s best books of 2019.
- Senator Jeff Flake, whose book Conscience of A Conservative (Random House, 2017) was a #4 NYT bestseller, established a platform from which he became a national figure, and announced his as the first voice from the right opposing President Trump.
- David and Lauren Hogg, whose book #NeverAgain (Random House, 2018) helped give voice to a rising generation and articulated a nascent movement’s goals. A NYT paperback bestseller.
- Ed Stack, CEO of DICK’s Sporting Goods (Scribner, 2019) whose book It’s How We Play the Game blends business memoir with social conscience.
- Arthur Blank, CEO, the Blank Family of Businesses, including the Atlanta Falcons and PGA Superstores. Blank was a co-founder of The Home Depot and ran the company for more than twenty years. His book will be published in the fall of 2020 by William Morrow.
- Barry Sonnenfeld, director of many films, including the Men in Black trilogy, Get Shorty and two Addams Family movies. His memoir, Barry Sonnenfeld, Call Your Mother, was published on March 10, 2020, from Hachette Books.
