= Mariacarla Boscono =

Italian fashion model (born 1980)

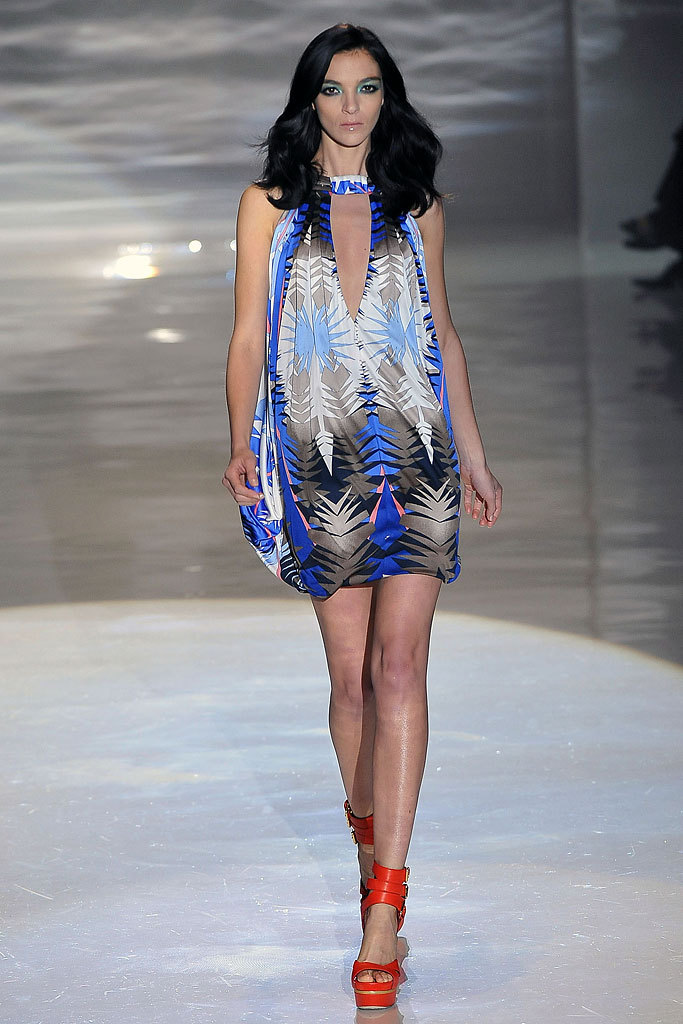
- Boscono in 2009
- Born: Mariacarla Boscono; 20 September 1980 (age 46); Rome, Italy
- Spouse: Claudio Stecchi (m. 2024)
- Modeling information
- Height: 5 ft 10 in (1.78 m)
- Hair color: Black
- Eye color: Brown
- Agency: Women Management (worldwide)

Mariacarla Boscono (pronounced [maˌri.aˈkarla boˈskɔːno]; born 20 September 1980) is an Italian fashion model and actress. Rising to fame in the early 2000s, Boscono has walked the runways of major worldwide fashion weeks and festivals, including Milan Fashion Week, New York Fashion Week and Paris Fashion Week, the Met Gala and Venice Film Festival. In 2005, over a two-week period, she walked more than seventy runways in three different cities (Milan, New York City, Paris), establishing a world record.

Vogue Paris declared her one of the top 30 models of the 2000s, and in 2005 she earned an estimated $3,500,000 in one year, earning her a spot on Forbes' list of the World's 15 Top-Earning Supermodels . Models.com has ranked Boscono on their Icons List, a ranking of the twenty supermodels considered icons in the fashion industry.

Boscono has worked with the most recognized fashion brands and become a favorite of famous designers such as the late Karl Lagerfeld and Riccardo Tisci. She has posed for major fashion magazines, having been photographed by Juergen Teller, Steven Meisel, Tim Walker, Peter Lindbergh, Peter Beard and Mert and Marcus. Boscono has also worked with other top models such as Natalia Vodianova, Caroline Trentini, Karlie Kloss, Naomi Campbell, and Joan Smalls.

Boscono made her theatrical debut in 2006 in New York City with the play The Maids by Jean Genet and between 2010 and 2011 in Imogen Kusch's plays Shakespeare's Women, The Winter's Tale and Cymbeline.

She has worked with world-renowned fashion brands such as Chanel, Blumarine, Moschino, Etro, Givenchy, Yves Saint Laurent, Jean-Paul Gaultier, Alessandro Dell'Acqua, Escada, Marc Jacobs, DKNY, Diesel, Roberto Cavalli, Alberta Ferretti, Armani, Dolce & Gabbana, Barneys New York, NARS Cosmetics, H&M, John Galliano, Hermes, Lanvin, Loewe, Prada, Pucci, Missoni, Laura Biagiotti, and Salvatore Ferragamo.

== Modeling career ==
In 1995, aged 15, Boscono entered the "Look of the Year" pageant during Festivalbar, held in Lignano Sabbiadoro. Boscono was then discovered by model agent Piero Piazzi, who signed her to the Ricardo Gay agency in Milan. At age 17, she flew to New York City and signed with DNA Model Management. Her first runways were in 1997 for Laura Biagiotti and Alberta Ferretti, continuing in the late 1990s for Italian and international stylists like Gai Mattiolo, Rocco Barocco, Fausto Sarli, Paul Smith, Issey Miyake, Vivienne Westwood, Guy Laroche. Boscono was noted by Karl Lagerfeld, becoming one of the favourite models of the stylist. It did not take long for Boscono to rise as an internationally known model, being featured on the cover of Vogue several times and walking in many high fashion runway shows of the first years of 00s for Armani, Dolce & Gabbana, Escada, Gianfranco Ferré, Alessandro Dell'Acqua Michael Kors and Alberta Ferretti.

During the 2005 fashion season, Boscono walked in over seventy fashion shows between New York City, Milan and Paris. She was named spokesperson for H&M in 2005, replacing Kate Moss, and during 2006's Fall Fashion Week she traded in her long dark locks for a short platinum blonde hairstyle reminiscent of Jean Seberg. Boscono was absent from the runways for both the Fall/Winter 2007 and Spring/Summer 2007 seasons. As of 2008, Boscono made her return to the runways in Paris at the Fall/Winter 2008 Couture collection for Dior and she was the sole face of Emilio Pucci, Hermès, John Galliano, and Moschino ad campaigns and walked for brands like Gucci, Dolce & Gabbana, Fendi, Versace, Yves Saint Laurent, and Jean Paul Gaultier. In November 2008, she signed a contract for the new Moschino's fragrance "Glamour", photographed by Patrick Demarchelier and she becomes the new face of the Dolce & Gabbana Spring/Summer 2009 advertising campaign with Brazilian model Caroline Trentini and American model Karlie Kloss. She posed in Africa for the 2009 Pirelli Calendar by Peter Beard. In 2009, she became the face of Dolce & Gabbana and Givenchy Spring/Summer 2009 ad campaigns. She was the face of the Fall/Winter 2009 Salvatore Ferragamo, Gianfranco Ferré and Dolce & Gabbana ad campaigns.

In 2011, she was photographed by Steven Meisel for Prada's spring collection and returned to fashion shows for Roberto Cavalli. In the same year she became the testimonial of Givenchy's "Dahlia Noir" perfume. Boscono was also invited with Riccardo Tisci at Met Gala. In 2012, she is called for Missoni's spring campaign, while in 2013 she walked in Armani, Alberta Ferretti and Dior's runways. From 2014 to 2015, she became the new model for Salvatore Ferragamo and came back to Alberta Ferretti's runway. In 2014 she was photographed by Mert and Marcus for spring session by Armani.

In 2016, Boscono is hired for the Fall/Winter collection for Chanel, Mugler and spring campaign of Stella McCartney, La Perla and Redken. In 2017, she becomes the face of Bottega Veneta, Vera Wang and Oscar de la Renta's Fall/Winter campaigns. In 2018, she appeared in Equipment collection, Ermanno Scervino winter collection photographed by Peter Lindbergh, and the new luxury collection by Marc Jacobs. In 2019, Paris Fashion Week she walks on chat-way for Valentino and she was the guest model for Karl LagerfeldxLuisaViaRoma's for the 90° anniversary of the boutique. Boscono mada a campaign for Burberry in Korea and participated at Met Gala. In 2020, she is the new face for Zara's summer collection, the model for Daniel Lee's collection for Bottega Veneta, she walks the runway of Tod's, Versace, Burberry, Salvatore Ferragamo, Tom Ford Fall/Winter collections. Boscono walked also Valentino's runway and posed for his spring campaign by Juergen Teller.

== Theatre career ==
On 18 May 2006, Boscono made her theater debut as Solange in Jean Genet's The Maids at the Lee Strasberg Theatre Institute in New York. Margherita Missoni played the role of her sister. In 2010, she played the role of Florizer in Imogen Kusch's Shakespeare's Women at Colosseum in Rome, while in 2011 she acted in The Winter's Tale and Cymbeline, both by Imogen Kusch.

== Personal life ==
In August 2012, Mariacarla announced the birth of her daughter. She is a single mother.

From 2019 to July 2020, she was linked romantically to Italian-Tunisian rapper Ghali to whom the song "Barcellona" he dedicated. She married Claudio Stecchi, Italian pole vaulter, in 2024.

== Agencies ==
- Women New York
- Women Milan (Mother Agency)
- Women Paris

== Clothing brands and magazine covers ==
=== Clothing brands ===
- Alberta Ferretti (1997–2000, 2013–2015)
- Alessandro Dell'Acqua (1998–2001)
- Armani (2000–2001, 2013–2015)
- Bottega Veneta (2017–present)
- Bulgari (2010
- Burberry (2019–present)
- Calvin Klein (2000–2003)
- Chanel (1997–present)
- Coccinelle (2016)
- Comme des Garçons (1999–2000)
- Dior (2008–2009, 2013–2014)
- Dolce & Gabbana (2000–2009)
- DSquared2 (2016–present)
- Emilio Pucci (2008)
- Equipment (2018)
- Ermanno Scervino (2017–2018)
- Escada (2003–2004)
- Fausto Sarli (1997–2000)
- Fendi (2008)
- Gai Mattiolo (1997–1998)
- Gianfranco Ferré (2000–2009)
- Givenchy (2000–present)
- Gucci (2008, 2016)
- Guy Laroche (1997–present)
- H&M (2005–2006)
- Hermès (2008)
- Issey Miyake (1997)
- Jean-Paul Gaultier (2008)
- John Galliano (2008)
- La Perla (2015–2016)
- Lanvin (2010)
- Laura Biagiotti (1997–1998)
- Karl Lagerfeld (1997–present)
- Marc Jacobs (2018)
- Michael Kors (2003–2004)
- Missoni (2012)
- Moschino (2008)
- Mugler (2016)
- NARS Cosmetics (2016)
- Off-White (2019–2020)
- Oscar de la Renta (2017)
- Paul Smith (1997)
- Prada (2011)
- Proenza Schouler (2018)
- Redken (2016)
- Rag & Bone (2016–2017)
- Roberto Cavalli (2010–2012)
- Rocco Barocco (1997–1998)
- Salvatore Ferragamo (2009, 2014–2015, 2019–2020)
- Sportmax (2016)
- Stella McCartney (2016)
- Tod's (2020)
- Tom Ford (2019–2020)
- Valentino (2018–present)
- Vera Wang (2017)
- Versace (2000–present)
- Vivienne Westwood (1997)
- Yves Saint Laurent (2008)
- Zara (2020)

=== Magazine ===
- Bazaar -US
- Bazaar – UK
- Cosmopolitan
- Dazed
- Exit
- Elle – Italy
- Elle – US
- Madame Figaro
- Gioia
- Glamour
- Grazia – Italy
- IO Donna
- Muse Magazine
- Numéro
- Paper
- Style
- Vanity Fair
- Vogue – Australia
- Vogue – Brasil
- Vogue – China
- Vogue – Germany
- Vogue – Italy
- Vogue – Japan
- Vogue – Korea
- Vogue – Paris
- Vogue – Russia
- Vogue – Turkey
- Vogue – US
- W Magazine
- 032c
