= Roitfeld =

Roitfeld is a surname. Notable people with the surname include:

- Carine Roitfeld (born 1954), French fashion editor, model, and writer
- Jacques Roitfeld (1889–1999), Russian-born French film producer
- Julia Restoin Roitfeld (born 1980), French creative director and designer
- Vladimir Restoin Roitfeld (born 1984), French-American businessman
