= Tom Ford (brand) =

Italian-American luxury fashion house

Tom Ford SA

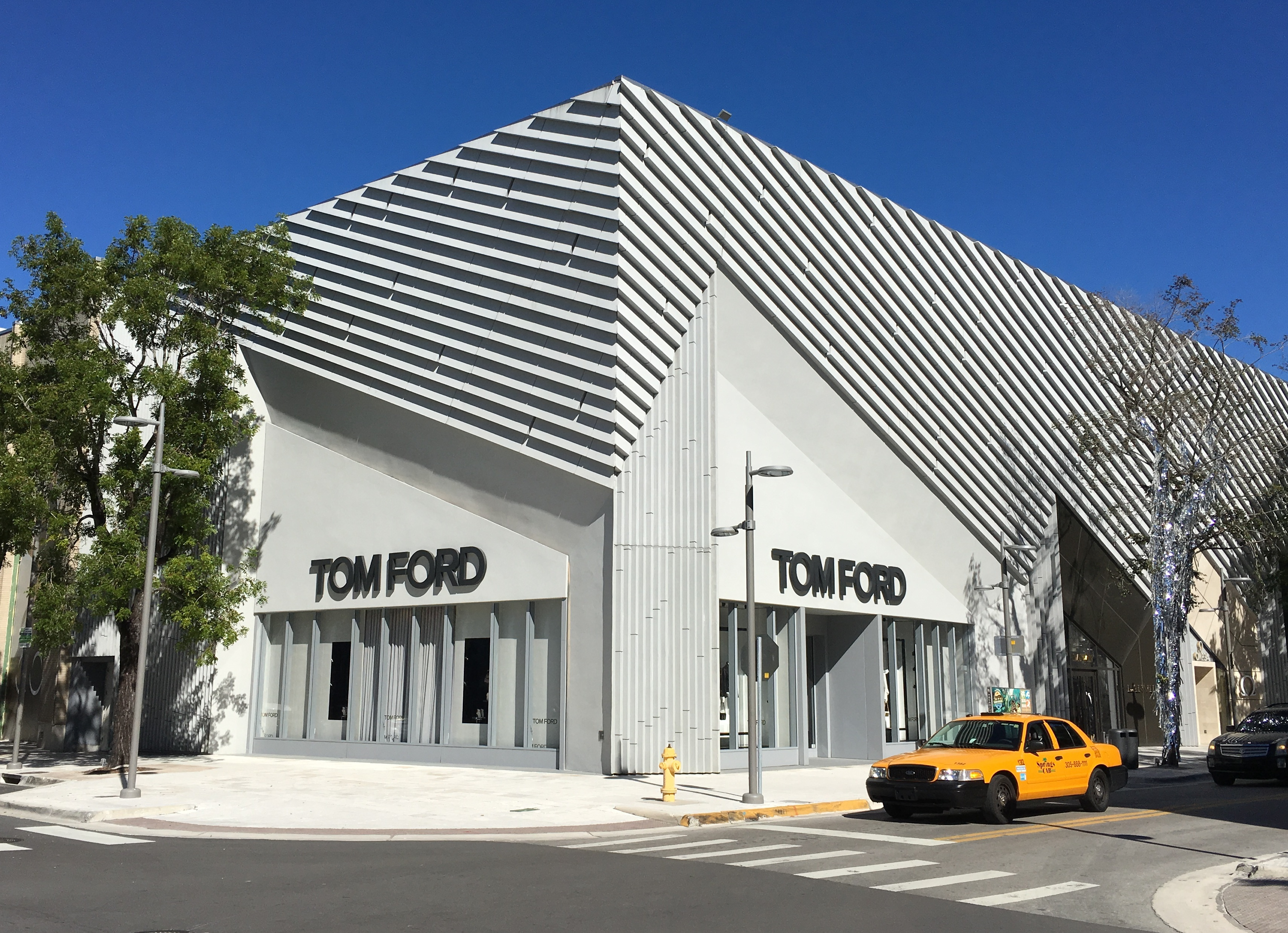
- Flagship store in Miami Design District
- Trade name: Tom Ford
- Type: Private company subsidiary of Estée Lauder Companies (Société Anonyme)
- Industry: Fashion
- Founded: 2005; 21 years ago
- Founder: Tom Ford
- Headquarters: New York City
- Key people: Haider Ackermann (Creative Director); Guillaume Jesel; (CEO and president)
- Products: Ready-to-wear; leather accessories; shoes; cosmetics; fragrances
- Revenue: ▲$654 million (2021)
- Owner: Tom Ford (2005-23); Estée Lauder (2023–present)
- Website: tomford.com

Tom Ford SA (stylized as TOM FORD) is an American luxury fashion house founded by namesake designer Tom Ford in 2005. Its product line features ready-to-wear and made-to-measure offerings, as well as footwear, accessories, handbags, cosmetics and fragrances.

The company was owned by Tom Ford until 2023 when he completed its sale. The Tom Ford brand is now owned by the Estée Lauder Companies while the fashion business is owned by the Ermenegildo Zegna Group through Tom Ford International.

== History ==
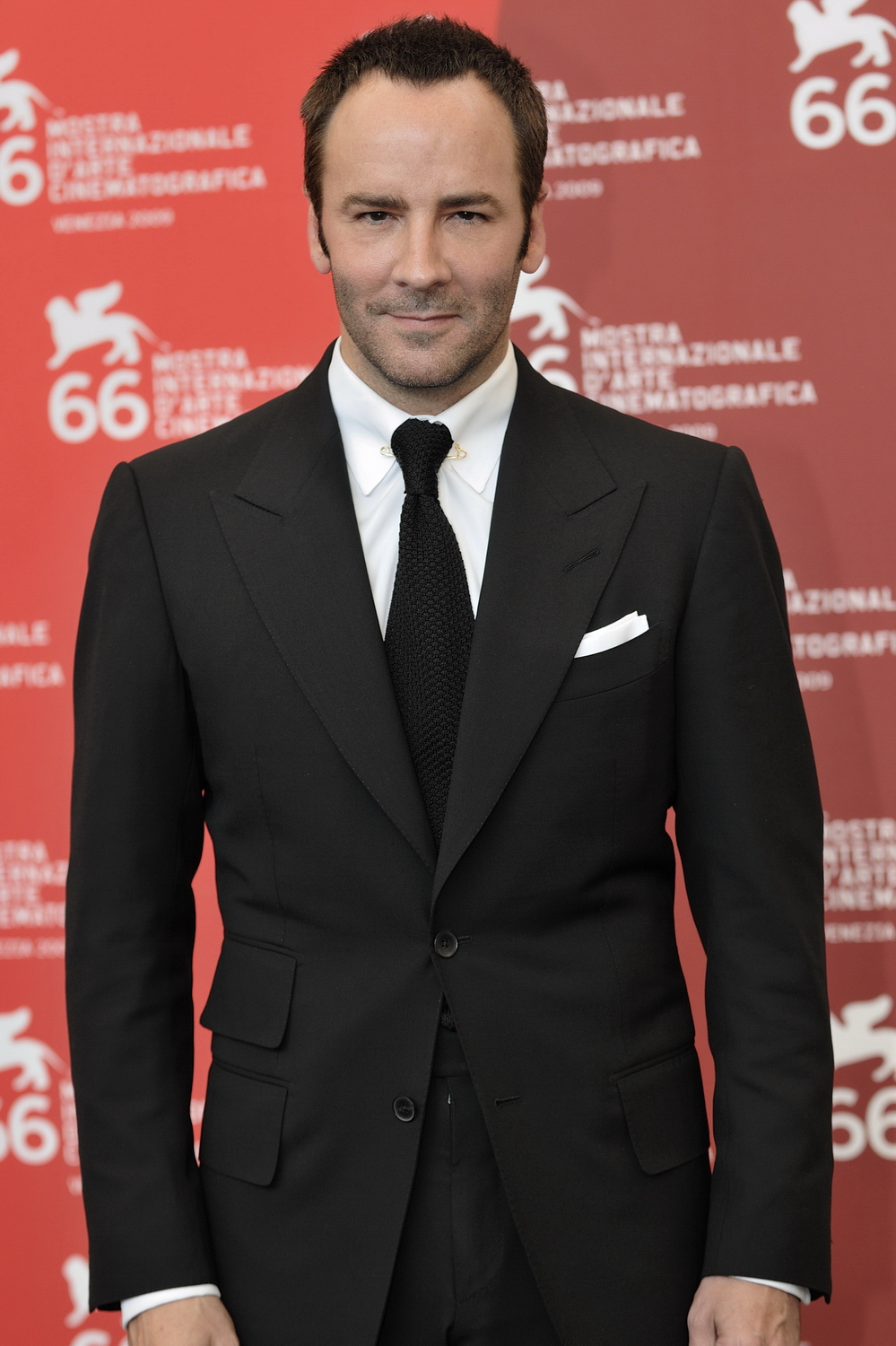
Tom Ford, the brand's founder and former creative director

Tom Ford departed his position as creative director at Gucci in 2004 and founded his own eponymous label in April 2005. The Tom Ford retail brand concept, described as the first true luxury brand of the 21st century, began in 2004 as a venture between Ford and his business partner Domenico de Sole with the launch of a cosmetics line. In the same year, Ford announced his partnership with Marcolin Group to produce and distribute optical frames and sunglasses. In 2005, he launched the Tom Ford Estée Lauder Collection of cosmetics.

tomford.com was launched in October 2006, initially only offering descriptions of the brand's products and later on hosting an online store.

In April 2007, the first directly owned Tom Ford flagship boutique opened at 845 Madison Avenue in New York City.

In September 2010, Ford debuted his label's women's ready-to-wear collection at his Madison Avenue store. The event featured celebrity models such as Beyoncé, Julianne Moore, Lauren Hutton, Daphne Guinness, and Rita Wilson.

In November 2015, the house opened its Miami flagship boutique in that city's Design District. In November 2017, it opened its first beauty store in London.

As of 2017, Tom Ford Beauty, owned by Estée Lauder, estimated $1 billion in sales. As of 2020, Tom Ford was the major shareholder of Tom Ford International, holding 63.75% of the shares.

The inception of the label has been criticized for using naked women in various advertising campaigns. Various journalists asserted that the ads were vulgar, sexist, or objectified women. One ad featured a nude woman holding a bottle of perfume between her legs. Another featured a naked woman ironing a man's pants while he read a newspaper. A separate ad was banned in Italy.

Responding to criticism that he objectified women, Ford stated he is an "equal opportunity objectifier" and is "just as happy to objectify men". He argued, "you can't show male nudity in our culture in the way you can show female nudity" and pointed out that he did a male nude ad while at Yves Saint Laurent which was pulled from circulation.

In 2014, the brand released a product called the "Penis Pendant Necklace". The product caused some controversy, with Christians calling it offensive due to the pendant being shaped similar to a Christian cross or crucifix. Ford replied that "it was not meant to be a cross, it was a phallus" and "people read into things what they want to".

The creation of the brand is detailed in the 2021 monograph Tom Ford 002, co-authored by Ford and fashion journalist Bridget Foley. The book is published by Rizzoli International Publications.

=== Sale to the Estée Lauder Companies ===
On April 28, 2023, the Estée Lauder Companies (ELC) announced that it had completed its acquisition of the Tom Ford brand for $2.8 billion. The sale was first announced in November 2022.

As part of the sale, the Zegna Group took full control of Tom Ford International which owns and operates the fashion business. The deal includes a long-term licensing and collaboration agreement for a minimum of 20 years with automatic 10 year renewals subject to certain minimum performance conditions.

Previously, Tom Ford licensed its name and branding to ELC for Tom Ford Beauty (TFB), offering cosmetics and fragrance, and to Marcolin Group for eyewear—both TFB and Tom Ford Perfums have been names used by Estée Lauder since 2006. Under ELC, men's and women's ready-to-wear is licensed to Zegna, who previously held the license for menswear.

On April 28, 2023, designer Peter Hawkings succeeded Ford as creative director. Hawking's first collection debuted on September 21 at Milan Fashion Week. Haider Ackermann was announced as the new Creative Director in September 2024, following Hawking's departure. His first collection will be released in March 2025.

== Tom Ford Beauty ==
=== Black Orchid (2006) ===
Black Orchid was the first fragrance sold under the Tom Ford Beauty banner. During his incumbency as Creative Director of Yves Saint Laurent, Ford had developed a rare black orchid as the brand's new in-house flower. Extract from the flower was used to produce a perfume, body cream and bath soap as part of YSL's Nu line. Previous to launching Black Orchid, Ford had worked with Estée Lauder, signing a deal in April 2005 and releasing Youth Dew Amber Nude, the following fall, and Azure, in spring 2006.

On 27 February 2006, having already started his brand, Black Orchid, the name for Ford's new fragrance with Estée Lauder Companies was made public. Described as "a women's fragrance...full of surprises" by Women's Wear Daily, its launch was planned for the following November, to be "beyond the parameters of a usual fragrance launch." Black Orchid by Tom Ford Beauty, as officially named, and manufactured by Esteé Lauder Companies, was finally released on 15 November. On 24 July, Ford held one-on-one meetings with editors from elite fashion publications where he presented the fragrance, which was described as "the anchor of what will become the Ford flotilla of fragrance and cosmetics initiatives."

Julia Restoin Roitfeld, daughter of then-Vogue Paris editor-in chief Carine Roitfeld, was chosen in July 2006 as brand ambassador for the fragrance previous to its release. Ford had described the younger Roitfeld as "exactly what beauty is to me." Later in the month it was announced that Black Orchid would be initially sold in a few upscale specialty stores and would increase to a maximum of fewer than 300 by the following spring. for the same time a launch of 12 unisex scents to be sold by perfumery store-in-stores inside the upcoming retail stores was also planned.

Black Orchid had a reported $20 million global advertising campaign, with 15 million scented impressions produced, with a planned $40 million revenue in its first year, selling between $90 and $135 for a bottle of eau de parfum, and $600 for the perfume. Then president and CEO of Estée Lauder, William P. Lauder, described the perfume as "the cornerstone of Mr. Ford's vision to bring more luxury into the world of fragrance." It was developed by having a grower create the darkest flower possible and then adding black truffle, lotus wood, bergamot and vanilla. Even though a woman's perfume, Ford allegedly told Estée Lauder executives that he wished the perfume smelled like "a man's crotch." Ford tracked down one of four existing black orchids through a Swiss orchid expert and a Santa Barbara grower. While it has been reported that the specific orchid that was used was the recherché dark orchid, Ford himself has stated that he holds the patent for the eponymous Tom Ford orchid, which was developed in Florida and he has described as "[m]aybe not completely black, but a deep, dark chocolate."

Black Orchid was launched on 2 November 2006 at the Saks Fifth Avenue flagship store, where Ford arrived to recommend strategies to the sales associates. Saks, as well as Neiman Marcus and Holt Renfrew stores, limited to a total of 50, started selling the fragrance on Sunday, 5 November. The night of the 2 November, an after-launch party occurred at Top of the Rock, with celebrities such as Damon Dash, Margherita Missoni, Stavros Niarchos, Zac Posen, Julia Restoin-Roitfeld, Carine Roitfeld, Rachel Roy, Donatella Versace, Olivia Wilde and Rachel Zoe in attendance. For the event, black curtains were installed at the venue and doused with the perfume.

Upon release, Harper's Bazaar described it as possessing a "sensual and woody floral scent." As part of Burberry's 150th anniversary, the store sold Black Orchid Eau de Parfum in limited-edition black crystal Lalique bottles for £345. The black, fluted glass bottle and cap and engraved gold plate label were described as reminiscent of black bottles such as those used for Narcisse Noir by Parfums Caron, Soir by Perugia, Dans La Nuit by House of Worth. The perfume bottle was photographed by Irving Penn, while the December 2006 British Vogue issue contained a five-page gatefold depicting the fragrance. For her part, Restoin Roitfeld was photographed "in an old-style Hollywood glamour shot, all red lipstick, dreamy hair and bedroom eyes."

=== Rose Prick (2020) ===
Inspired by Ford's private rose garden, Rose Prick, was made from wild roses such as Rose de Mai, Turkish and Bulgarian roses, as well as other elements such as chypre, Indonesian patchouli, and vanilla and Tonka bean. The perfume trademark was filed for registration at the United States Patent and Trademark Office on 30 May 2019, and first used commercially when the fragrance was released on 29 February 2020. Fabrizio Freda, Estée Lauder CEO, described it as "[combining] all rose floral with a little spicy tender." The fragrance, which has hints of "the rare Bulgarian rose, rose de mai, Sichuan pepper, turmeric, patchouli and tonka," was released in February 2020, at US$335 (AU $480, £218, €245, CAN $405) for the 50 mL eau de parfum, while the 10 mL bottle sold for €64 and the 100 mL bottle for £325. The perfume is stored "in a matte, opaque, pink [flacon] bottle [with] a matte black metal stamp," which has been described as "[having] the elegant, architectural look of a chessboard." Rose Prick is also the name of a tie-in lip colour set, which was described by the South China Morning Post as "wears effortlessly from day into night," as well as an eponymous $132 (£98) candle, described as having a "spicy floral scent."

When released at Holt Renfrew in Canada, Rose Prick sold out in two days time. The Daily Telegraph recommended it to individuals who usually do not have a preference towards florals, and called it "a lingering evening fragrance." While Women's Wear Daily called it one of 2020's top ten best fragrances. On the other hand, The Globe and Mail critiqued that its name had "more of an impression than the juice...what remains is a faint patchouli incense."

=== Other fragrances ===
In 2007, the Private Blend collection of fragrances were introduced by Tom Ford Beauty that featured more experimental and niche-quality fragrances at a higher price point. Tom Ford has described Private Blend as his "own personal scent laboratory". As of 2021, the Private Blend collection contains twenty three fragrances. The Eau de Parfum Spray, Lost Cherry, won the allure 2021 Best of Beauty Award.

At his Spring/Summer 2018 collection runway show, held in September 2017 as part of New York Fashion Week, Tom Ford garnered media attention for unveiling a new Private Blend fragrance titled "Fucking Fabulous". Tom Ford faced reluctance from Estée Lauder Companies in naming the fragrance, with Ford himself saying that "First of all, they didn't even want to launch it" and that he had to insist on the name because "I knew it would be a hit with that name".
