= Claire Thomson-Jonville =

Scottish journalist (born c. 1981)

- Born: c. 1981 (age ~45); Scotland
- Occupation: Journalist
- Title: Head of Editorial Content, Vogue France (2025–present)
- Children: 2

Claire Thomson-Jonville (born c. 1981), is a Scottish journalist and fashion editor who is currently the head of editorial content of Vogue France.

== Early life ==
Jonville was born in Scotland. She lived in England during her childhood however later moved back to Scotland to study law at the University of Edinburgh. During her time at the University of Edinburgh she also went on an exchange to Paris-Sorbonne University.

When she was in school she was 'obsessed' with Vogue and the work of Corinne Day, Venetia Scott, Juergen Teller and Melanie Ward.

== Career ==
She became editor-in-chief of Self Service magazine in 2015.

In 2022 she launched Out of State a series of wellness retreat pop-up events. The first was in Bodrum, Turkey in 2022 followed by another at the Château de la Bourdaisière in 2023.

Thomson-Jonville oversaw the December 2024/January 2025 'La Renaissance du Chic' issue of Vogue France following the departure of Eugénie Trochu.

In January 2025, her appointment as Head of Editorial Content of Vogue France was announced. She entered the position on 3 February 2025. On her appointment, Anna Wintour cited Thomson-Jonvilles experience as a stylist, fashion editor, and journalist, as well as her focus on French character for the publication.

=== Timeline ===
Timeline of her career:

- Deputy Editor at Self Service, 2009–2015
- Editor-in-Chief at Self Service, 2015–2018
- Creative Director at CTJ x Pallas, 2018–2021
- Creative Director at CTJ Creative, 2018–2024
- Editorial Director at i-D (France), 2021–2024
- Global Contributing Editor at Vogue, 2024–present
- Head of Editorial Content at Vogue France, 2025–present
- Head of Editorial Content at Vogue France Collections, 2025–present

== Personal life ==
She currently lives in Paris with her two children.

Media offices
Preceded by Eugénie Trochu	Head of Editorial Content at Vogue France; 2025–present	Succeeded by current
