= Venetia Scott =

Photographer, Stylist & Fashion Editor

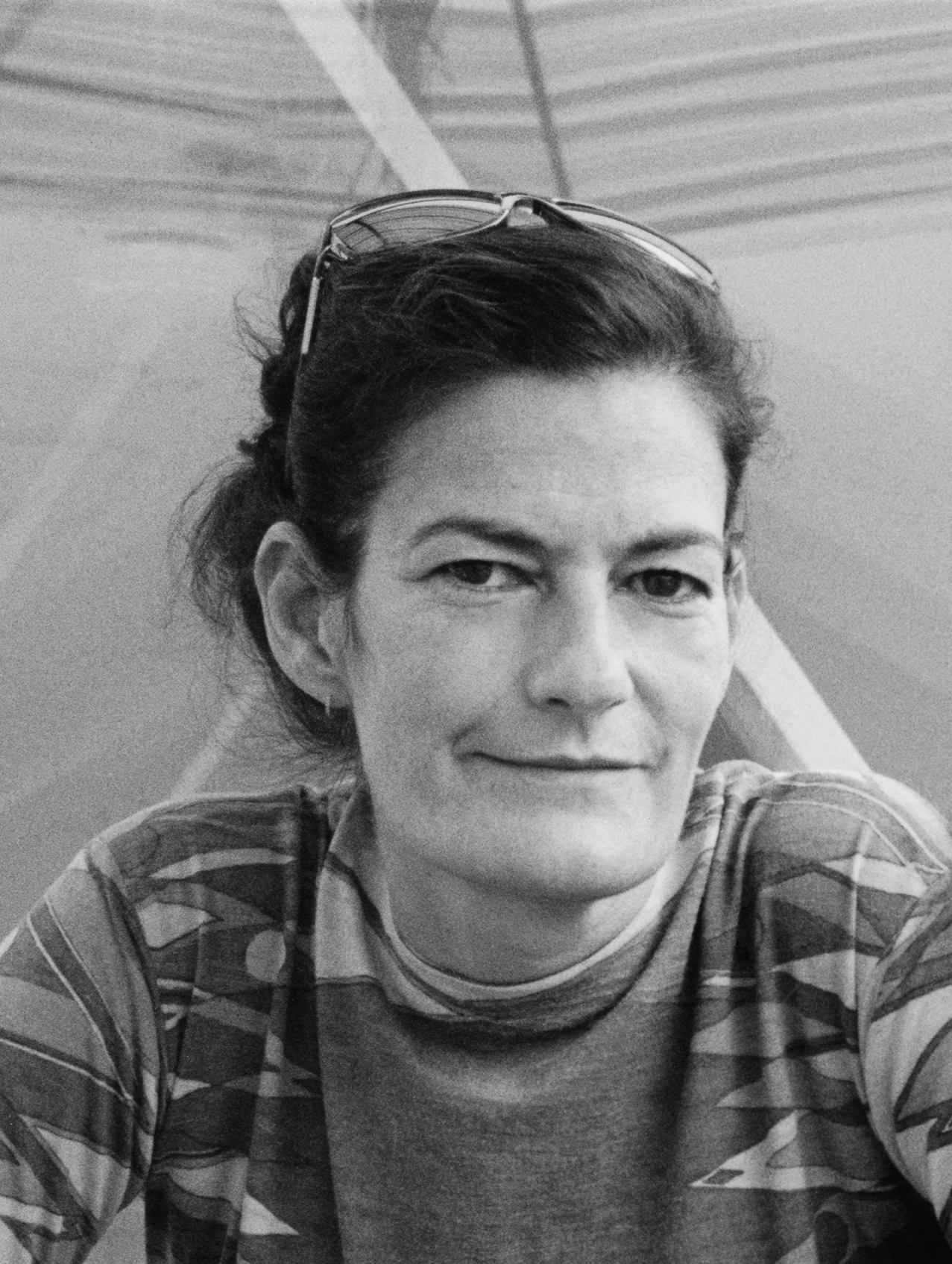
- Born: Venetia Lucy Scott; 25 June 1963 (age 63); UK
- Occupations: photographer; fashion editor; stylist
- Years active: 1984–present
- Title: Fashion Director for Nova (1999–2001); Creative Director for Marc Jacobs and Marc by Marc Jacobs (2001–2015); Fashion Director for British Vogue (2017–2020)
- Partner(s): Juergen Teller (1990–2003)
- Children: 1 (Lola Teller)
- Relatives: Sir Eustace Fiennes (grandfather); Sir Ranulph Fiennes (uncle); Ralph Fiennes (second cousin, once removed); Hero Fiennes Tiffin (second cousin, twice removed)
- Family: Twisleton-Wykeham-Fiennes family

Venetia Scott (born 25 June 1963) is a British photographer, fashion stylist and author. She is contributing Fashion Director at British Vogue.

== Early life ==
Scott was born on 25 June 1963 in Tidworth, the youngest child of Lt.-Col. John Jervoise Fitzgerald Scott and Susan Fiennes. As her father was a military attaché, she lived her young life in Germany, France, Iran and the UK. Aged seven, Scott was sent to Leaden Hall School in Salisbury, England, as a boarder. She later attended St Mary's School, Calne, Wiltshire, aged 11 to 17.

== Career ==
=== British Vogue ===
Scott joined British Vogue in 1984 as the personal assistant to Beatrix Miller, and later became fashion assistant to Grace Coddington.

=== Freelance stylist ===
In 1987, she went freelance as a stylist and art director, and worked with fashion photographers including Juergen Teller, Corrine Day, David Sims, Glen Luchford, Helmut Newton, Mario Sorrenti, Inez and Vinoodh and Alasdair McLellan.

=== Juergen Teller collaboration ===
In the early 1990s, Scott's collaboration with Juergen Teller became synonymous with the British grunge scene. She was credited for steering Teller into the style that remains his sometimes controversial signature.

=== Marc Jacobs ===
From 1997, Scott started working closely with Marc Jacobs and was appointed Creative Director of Marc Jacobs in 2001, heading the Marc by Marc Jacobs line from its launch.

=== Photography ===
In 2005, Scott started taking photographs. She has shot campaigns for Margaret Howell, A.P.C., Moschino, M Missoni, Valentino RED, Fendi, and Agent Provocateur.

She has contributed to British Vogue, Vogue Italia, Vogue France, Vogue China, AnOther, Self Service, i-D, The Face, W, Dazed & Confused, Purple, Interview, POP, Arena, Arena Homme +, Nova and Document Journal.

Her portraits include Barry Keoghan, Rosamund Pike, Cate Blanchett, Kate Moss, Isabelle Huppert, Marina Abramović, Willem Dafoe, Elle Fanning, Nicholas Hoult, Liv Tyler, Dua Lipa, Bella Hadid, Jacob Elordi, Richard E. Grant, Archie Madekwe, Alison Oliver, Thomas Brodie-Sangster and George MacKay.

=== Fashion Director at British Vogue ===
In 2017, Scott was appointed as Fashion Director of British Vogue under editor-in-chief Edward Enninful. She returned to freelance work in 2020 while remaining as contributing fashion director for British Vogue.

== Publications ==
Scott is the author of Fragile Face Lay Flat, which involves cropping into photographs taken from a 12-year archive of fashion editorials and campaigns so that only the faces of the models remain; it is published by Sion and Moore.

Other publications containing sections for Venetia Scott include:

- Fashion: Fashion Photography of the Nineties Camilla Nickerson & Neville Wakefield. 1996 ISBN 9783931141264
- Imperfect Beauty: The Making of Contemporary Fashion Photography Charlotte Cotton. 2000 ISBN 9781851773206
- Stylist: The Interpreters of Fashion Sarah Mower. 2007 ISBN 9780847829248.
- Stylists: New Fashion Visionaries Katie Baron. 2012 ISBN 9781856698290.
- Venetia Scott: Fragile Face Lay Flat Sion and Moore. 2019
- Spike Island IDEA. 2021

== Solo exhibitions ==
- 2019 Fragile Face Lay Flat 5 Carlos Place, London

== Personal life ==
Scott has one daughter with Juergen Teller; Lola Teller was born in August 1997.
