= Juergen Teller =

German fine-art and fashion photographer (born 1964)

- Jürgen Teller
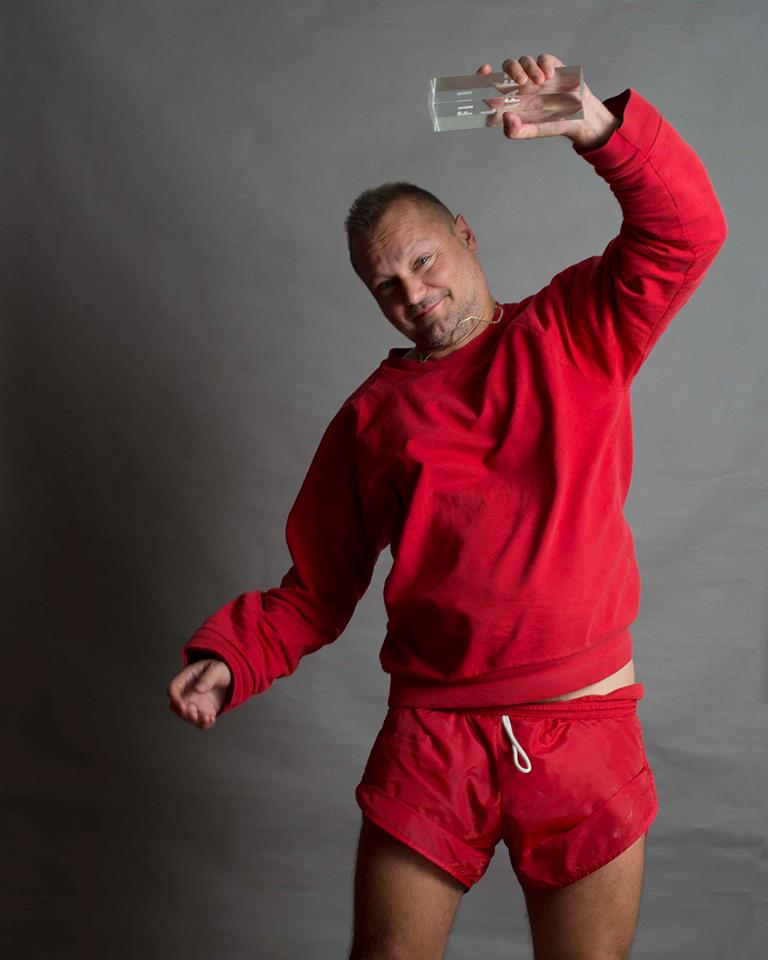
- Teller in 2013
- Born: 28 January 1964 (age 62); Erlangen, West Germany
- Education: Bayerische Staatslehranstalt für Photographie (now the Munich University of Applied Sciences), 1984–1986
- Occupations: fashion photographer, fine-art photographer
- Years active: 1988－present
- Style: Minimalism, beauty of imperfection, "amateur" aesthetic, humanizing aesthetic
- Spouse(s): Sadie Coles (2003–2018); Dovile Drizyte (2021–)
- Partner: Venetia Scott (1990–2003)
- Children: 3
- Website: www.juergenteller.co.uk

Juergen Teller (born 28 January 1964) is a German fine-art and fashion photographer. He was awarded the Citibank Prize for Photography in 2003 and received the Special Presentation International Center of Photography Infinity Award in 2018.

Major solo exhibitions of his work have been organised at Fondation Cartier pour l’art Contemporain, Paris (2006); Le Consortium, Dijon, France (2010); Dallas Contemporary, Texas (2011); Daelim Museum, Seoul (2011); Institute of Contemporary Art, London (2013); Contemporary Fine Arts, Berlin (2015); Kunsthalle Bonn, Germany (2016), Garage Museum of Contemporary Art, Moscow (2018), Grand Palais Éphémère, Paris (2023) and Onassis Ready, Athens (2025). Self-portraiture has been a prominent feature of his practice and was the main focus of his 'Macho' exhibition at DESTE Foundation, Athens, Greece (2014).

== Early life and education ==
Juergen (Jürgen) Teller was born 28 January 1964 in Erlangen, West Germany. Before embarking on a career of photography, Teller tried to follow in his family's footsteps by learning to craft violin bridges. Teller ended up being forced to quit however, because he developed an unusual allergy to wood.

Teller studied at the Bayerische Staatslehranstalt für Photographie in Munich, Germany (1984–1986). In order to avoid military national service, he learned English and moved to London in 1986, aged 22.

== Career ==
From the beginning his career in the late 1980s, Teller has blurred the boundaries between his commissioned and personal work in his numerous campaigns, editorials, publications and exhibitions. Teller treats all of his subjects—family members, celebrities, and himself with a uniform style of grit, raw emotion and humour that has become his iconic and recognizable aesthetic.

His photographs have appeared in Arena Homme +, The Face, i-D, 032c, Index Magazine, Pop, Purple, Self Service, W, Vogue (American, Australian, British, French, Italian, Japanese, Polish) and Zeit magazin among others. He photographed Kylie Minogue for the artwork of her 1991 album Let's Get to It. Teller first gained wider recognition in 1996 with his front cover of Süddeutsche Zeitung Magazine featuring a nude Kristen McMenamy with the word 'Versace' drawn in a heart across her chest.

In 1997, Marc Jacobs worked with Teller's then-partner, Venetia Scott to style his collections and Teller shot Kim Gordon from Sonic Youth for the Spring Summer 1998 campaign.

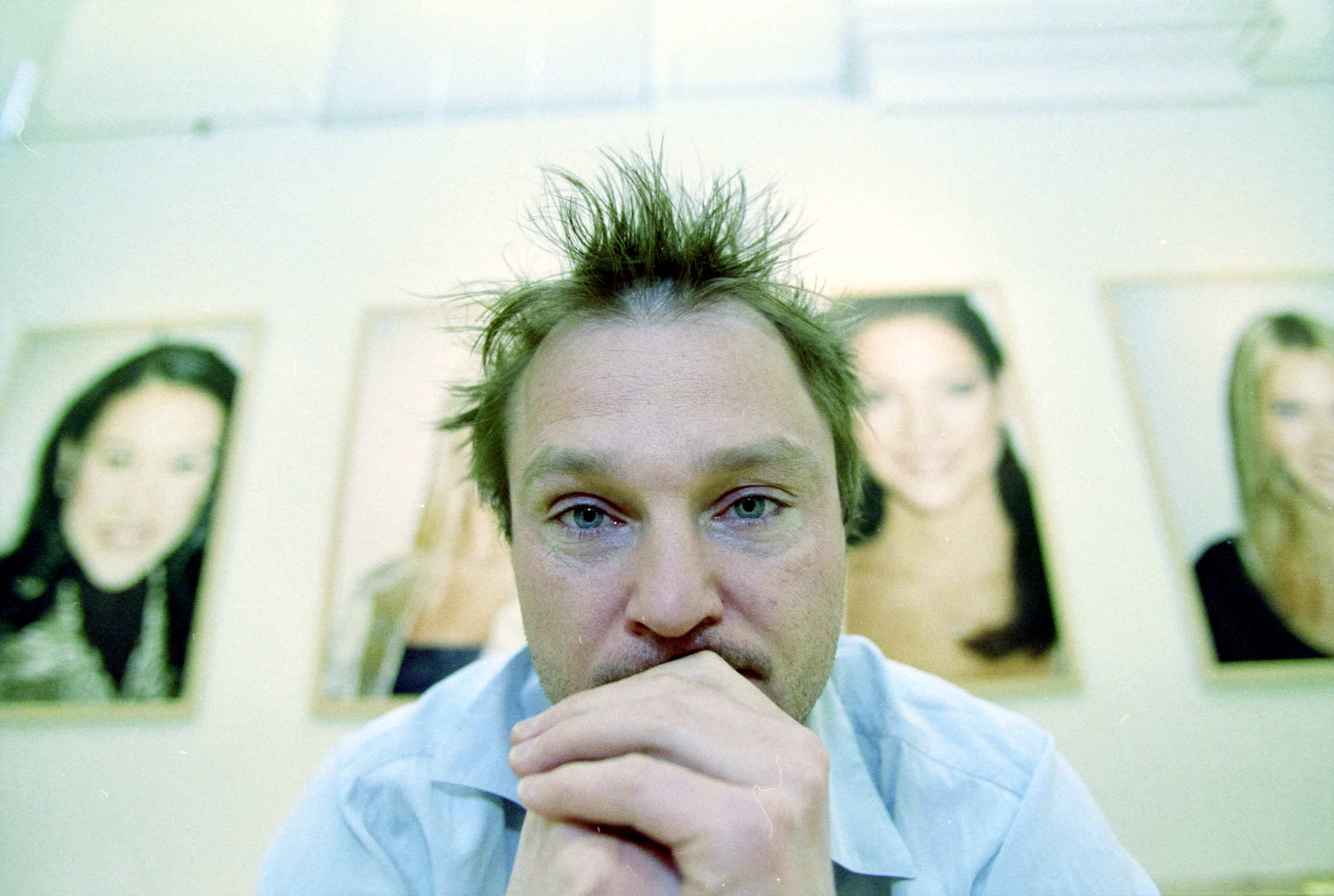
Juergen Teller in Haarlem, 2003

For the brand's 2005 campaign, he photographed himself with Cindy Sherman and also collaborated with Winona Ryder, Sofia Coppola, Helena Bonham Carter, Michael Stipe, Rufus Wainwright and Harmony Korine amongst others until the SS2014 campaign. Teller has also collaborated with a range of other designers and fashion houses during his career, including Helmut Lang, Yves Saint Laurent, Vivienne Westwood, Céline, Missoni, Moschino, Barney's, Louis Vuitton, Adidas, Palace and Valentino.

Teller has photographed many celebrities, musicians, artists, athletes, and photographers, including Arnold Schwarzenegger, O. J. Simpson, Kurt Cobain, Bjork, Kate Moss, Elton John, Joan Didion, Pelé, Michael Olise, David Hockney, Roni Horn, Sarah Lucas, William Eggleston, Boris Mikhailov and Araki Nobuyoshi. He photographed American rapper Kanye West for T: The New York Times Style Magazine and shot the 'Kanye, Juergen and Kim' supplement for System featuring Kanye West and Kim Kardashian as well as himself in 2015. The actress Charlotte Rampling has been a long term collaborator, appearing in Teller's Louis XV series which was exhibited at Contemporary Fine Arts, Berlin and published by Steidl as a book in 2005, and the Paradis photographs shot at Musée du Louvre in 2009.

Teller has directed several fashion films, short films and artist videos including Can I Own Myself (1998), Go-Sees (2001), World Cup Final, Germany 0 Brazil 2 London (2002), Schmetterling' (2005) and Dieter (2017).

=== Teaching ===
Teller was Professor of Photography at the Academy of Fine Arts in Nuremberg from 2014 to 2019.

=== Curating ===
In 2016, Teller curated an exhibition of Robert Mapplethorpe's photographs at Alison Jacques Gallery in London where he selected 58 images from the Mapplethorpe Foundation collection.

== Personal life ==
Teller was married to UK contemporary art dealer Sadie Coles from 2003 to 2018. Teller married Dovile Drizyte in 2021.

== Publications ==
- Juergen Teller. Cologne: Taschen, 1996
- Der verborgene Brecht. Ein Berliner Stadtrundgang. Zurich: Scalo, 1998
- Go-Sees: Girls Knocking on My Door. Zurich: Scalo, 1999. ISBN 978-3908247142.
- Remake Berlin. Steidl Verlag, Fotomuseum Winterthur, Bank Hofmann AG, 1999
- Tracht.Göttingen: Steidl/Lehmann Maupin Gallery, 2001
- More. Göttingen: Steidl, 2001
- Märchenstüberl. Göttingen: Steidl, 2002
- Zwei Schäuferle mit Kloß und eine Kinderportion Schnitzel mit Pommes Frites. Göttingen: Steidl, 2003
- Nackig auf dem Fußballplatz. Göttingen: Steidl, 2003
- Louis XV. Göttingen: Steidl, 2004
- Ich bin Vierzig. Göttingen: Steidl, 2004
- The Master. Göttingen: Steidl, 2004
- Ohne Titel. Göttingen: Steidl, 2005
- Nürnberg. Göttingen: Steidl, 2006
- Ed in Japan. Paris: Purple publications, 2006
- Jürgen Teller, Do You Know What I Mean. Exhibition catalogue. Paris: Foundation Cartier pour l'art contemporain/London-New York: Thames & Hudson, 2006
- Juergen Teller Vivienne Westwood, Spring Summer 2008. Göttingen: Steidl, 2008
- Election Day, Vivienne Westwood, Spring Summer 2009. Göttingen: Steidl, 2009
- Juergen Teller: Marc Jacobs Advertising 1997-2008. Göttingen: Steidl, 2008
- The Master II. Göttingen: Steidl, 2010
- Zimmermann. Göttingen: Steidl, 2010
- The Deste Foundation Collection. Göttingen: Steidl, 2010
- Get a Life, Vivienne Westwood Spring Summer 2010. Göttingen: Steidl, 2010
- Calves and Thighs. TF Editore, 2010
- Touch Me. Reel, 2011
- Hotel Il Pellicano. Italy: Slim Arons, John Swope, Juergen Teller, Rizzoli 2011
- Common Ground. Marsilio Editoria, 2012
- The Keys to the House. Göttingen: Steidl, 2012
- Pictures and Text Göttingen: Steidl, 2012
- The Master III Göttingen: Steidl, 2012
- Woo! Juergen Teller Steidl and ICA, 2013
- Eating at Hotel Il Pellicano. Violette Editions, 2013
- Kolkata. The Juergen Teller Purple Book, Purple Institute, 2014
- I'm Fifty. Suzanne Tarasieve, Paris, 2014
- Araki Teller, Teller Araki., Eyesencia, 2014. With Nobuyoshi Araki
- I Just Arrived in Paris. (Louis Vuitton AW2014), Göttingen: Steidl, 2014
- Siegerflieger Göttingen: Steidl, 2015
- The Flow. (Louis Vuitton SS2015), Göttingen: Steidl, 2015
- Season Three. (Louis Vuitton AW2015), Göttingen: Steidl, 2015
- The Clinic. Contemporary Fine Arts, Berlin, 2015
- Mit dem Teller nach Bonn. Steidl/Bundeskunsthalle, 2016
- Boris Mikhailov, Parliament. Rodovid, Kyiv, Ukraine, 2017
- Vivienne Westwood, Andreas Kronthaler, Juergen Teller. In Other Words, 2017
- Leg, Snails and Peaches. Suzanne Tarasieve, Paris, 2018
- The Master IV. Göttingen: Steidl, 2019
- Handbags. Göttingen: Steidl, 2019
- Mmm!. Göttingen: Steidl, 2019
- TELLER ABLOH. Fine Print/Prestel, 2019
- 50 Times Bonami and Obrist. Göttingen: Steidl, 2019
- Plumtree Court. Göttingen: Steidl, 2020
- Leben und Tod: Nobuyoshi Araki and Juergen Teller. Göttingen: Steidl, 2020
- The Nipple, Annual Series No.7. Oakland California: TBW, 2020
- William Eggleston 414. Göttingen: Steidl, 2020. With Harmony Korine. ISBN 978-3-95829-763-0.
- Donkey Man and Other Stories. New York: Rizzoli, 2021. ISBN 978-0-8478-7077-6.
- Auguri. Göttingen: Steidl, 2022. With Dovile Drizyte. ISBN 978-3-96999-093-3.
- Notes About My Work. Göttingen: Steidl, 2022. ISBN 978-3-96999-135-0.
- The Master V. Göttingen: Steidl, 2022. ISBN 978-3-96999-134-3.
- Fashion Photography for America 1999–2016. Göttingen: Steidl, 2023. ISBN 978-3-96999-295-1.
- More Handbags. Göttingen: Steidl, 2023. ISBN 978-3-96999-290-6.
- Jurgaičai. Göttingen: Steidl, 2023. ISBN 978-3-96999-292-0.
- The Myth. Göttingen: Steidl, 2023. ISBN 978-3-96999-294-4.
- i need to live. Göttingen: Steidl, 2023. ISBN 978-3-96999-291-3.
- Old Mills Never Die: Birkenstock. Göttingen: Steidl, 2024. ISBN 978-3-96999-352-1.
- Saint Laurent: Juergen Teller x Anthony Vaccarello. Paris: Saint Laurent Editions, 2024.
- Auschwitz Birkenau. Göttingen: Steidl, 2025
- you are invited. Göttingen: Steidl, 2025

== Awards ==
- 2003: Citibank Prize for Photography
- 2018: Special Presentation, International Center of Photography Infinity Award

== Exhibitions ==
=== Solo exhibitions ===
- 1998 Juergen Teller, The Photographers' Gallery, London
- 2002 Märchenstüberl, Münchner Stadtmuseum, Germany
- 2002 Märchenstüberl, Museum Folkwang, Essen, Germany
- 2003 Märchenstüberl, Galleria d'Arte Moderna, Bologna, Italy
- 2003 Märchenstüberl, Frans Hals Museum, Haarlem, Netherlands
- 2003 Tracht, Kunsthalle Mannheim, Mannheim, Germany
- 2004 Go-sees and World cup Final, Germany v Brazil 0-2 Temple Bar Visual Arts, Dublin, Ireland
- 2004 Ich bin Vierzig, Kunsthalle Wien, Vienna, Austria
- 2006 Do You Know What I Mean, Fondation Cartier pour l'Art Contemporain, Paris
- 2007 Awailable, Inverleith House, Edinburgh, Scotland
- 2009 Teller, Frans Hals Museum, Haarlem, Netherlands
- 2009 Logisch, Kunsthalle Nürnberg, Germany
- 2010 Touch Me, Le Consortium, Dijon, France
- 2011 Man with Banana, Dallas Contemporary, US
- 2011 Texte und Bilder, Moscow House of Photography, Russia
- 2011 Texte und Bilder, Brukenthal National Museum, Sibiu, Romania
- 2012 Bilder und Texte, Embassy of the Federal Republic of Germany, London, UK
- 2013 Woo!, Institute of Contemporary Arts, London
- 2014 Bus Stops, Strand, London
- 2014 Macho, Deste Foundation, Athens, Greece
- 2016 Enjoy Your Life!, Bundeskunsthalle, Bonn, Germany
- 2016 Enjoy Your Life!, Galerie Rudolfinum, Prague, Czech Republic
- 2017 Enjoy Your Life!, Martin-Gropius-Bau, Berlin, Germany
- 2017 Juergen Teller, Kunstpalais Erlangen, Germany
- 2017 Juergen Teller, Great Arch Hall, Photo London, Somerset House, London
- 2018 Enjoy Your Life!, Fotomuseum Winterthur, Switzerland
- 2018 Zittern auf dem Sofa, Garage Museum of Contemporary Art, Moscow, Russia
- 2019 Handbags, Museo Villa Pignatelli, Naples, Italy
- 2019 Heimweh, Konig Tokio x MCM Ginza Haus I, Tokyo
- 2021 What Are We Talking About?, T-10, Beijing, China
- 2023 i need to live, Grand Palais Éphémère, Paris, France
- 2024 i need to live, Triennale, Milano, Italy
- 2024 Where we come from, Kunstpalais, Erlangen, Germany
- 2025 Auschwitz Birkenau, Kunsthaus Göttingen, Germany
- 2025 Auschwitz Birkenau, Casstl, Antwerp, Belgium
- 2025 7 ½, Sabbioneta Galleria Degli Antichi, Palazzo Giardino, Italy
- 2025 you are invited, Onassis Ready, Athens, Greece

=== Curated exhibitions ===
- 2016 Teller on Mapplethorpe, Alison Jacques Gallery, London

=== Selected Group exhibitions ===
- 2000 Remake Berlin, Fotomuseum, Winterthur, Zürich, Switzerland
- 2003 Citibank Photography Prize, The Photographers Gallery, London, UK
- 2004 Fashioning Fiction: Photography since 1990, Museum of Modern Art, New York, USA
- 2006 Click double Click, Haus der Kunst, Munich, Germany and Palais des Beaux Arts, Brussels, Belgium
- 2006 The Kate Show, The Foam Museum, Amsterdam, Netherlands
- 2007 A Poem about an Inland Sea, Ukrainian Pavilion, Palazzo Papadopoli, 52nd Venice Biennale, Italy - Represented Ukraine as one of five artists
- 2008 Street & Studio: An Urban History of Photography, Tate Modern, London, UK
- 2008 Fashion in the Mirror, Photographer’s Gallery, London, UK
- 2010 Not in Fashion, MMK Museum, Frankfürt, Germany
- 2011 Nothing in the World but Youth, Turner Contemporary, Margate, UK
- 2011 Making it Up as We Go Along: 20 Years of Dazed and Confused magazine, Somerset House, London, UK
- 2012 Night in Twilight: Art from Romanticism to the Present, Belvedere Museum, Vienna, Austria
- 2012-13 Riotous Baroque, Kunsthaus Zurich, Switzerland, Toured to Guggenheim, Bilbao, Spain (2013)
- 2014 Paparazzi! Photographers, Stars and Artists, Centre Pompidou, Metz, France
- 2015 Sleepless: The Bed in History and Contemporary Art, Belvedere 21, Vienna, Austria
- 2015-2016Faces Now: European Portrait Photography Since 1990, BOZAR Centre for Fine Arts, Brussels, toured to Nederlands Fotomuseum, Rotterdam, and National Museum of Photography, Thessaloniki, Greece
- 2016 VOGUE 100: A Century of Style, National Portrait Gallery, London and Manchester Art Gallery
- 2016 Get a Life: Vivienne Westwood, K11 Shanghai Xinshiyi Art Center, Shanghai, China
- 2017 La Vie Simple - Simplement la Vie, Fondation Vincent van Gogh, Arles, France
- 2017 Aging Pride, Museum Belvedere, Vienna, Austria
- 2017 Boris Mikhailov Parliament, Ukrainian Pavilion at the Venice Biennale, Italy
- 2018 Icons of Style: A Century of Fashion Photography 1911-2011, J. Paul Getty Museum, Los Angeles, USA
- 2018-19 Dior: From Paris to the World, Denver Art Museum, Denver, USA, Toured to Dallas Museum of Art, USA
- 2020 The Exhausted Man, Swiss National Museum, Zurich, Switzerland
- 2020 Beyond Fashion, Shanghai Center of Photography, Shanghai, China, Toured to ArtisTree, Hong Kong; Xie Zilong Photography Museum, Changsha, China; ALT.1 Hundai Seoul, Seoul, South Korea; IPFO, House of Photography, Olten, Switzerland; Saatchi Gallery, London, UK (2019-2024)
- 2021 E/Motion. Fashion in Transition, MoMu Fashion Museum Antwerp, Belgium
- 2021 Captivate! Fashion Photography from the 1990s. Curated by Claudia Schiffer, Kunstpalast, Dusseldorf, Germany
- 2021 Vogue Paris-100 years-1920-2020, Palais Galliera, Paris, France
- 2022 Joan Didion: What She Means, Hammer Museum, Los Angeles, USA
- 2022 Football: Sport and Spectacle, Design Museum, London, UK
- 2022 Beyond Fashion, ALT.1 Hundai Seoul, Seoul, South Korea
- 2023 Beyond Fashion, IPFO, House of Photography, Olten, Switzerland
- 2024 Beyond Fashion, Saatchi Gallery, London, UK
- 2024 Fragile Beauty, V&A, London, UK
- 2024 Naomi in Fashion, V&A, London, UK
- 2025 The Face Magazine: Culture Shift, National Portrait Gallery, London, UK
- 2025 GIRLS: On Boredom, Rebellion, and Being In-Between, MoMu Fashion Museum Antwerp, Belgium

== Collections ==
Teller's work is held in the following permanent collections:

- Centre Pompidou, Paris
- Fondation Cartier pour l'Art Contemporain, Paris
- Le Louvre, Paris, France
- Museum für Moderne Kunst, Frankfurt
- National Portrait Gallery, London: 3 prints (as of January 2021)
- Victoria and Albert Museum, London: 4 prints (as of January 2021)
