= Verrilli =

Verrilli is a surname. Notable people with the surname include:

- Donald Verrilli Jr. (born 1957), American lawyer
- Mario Verrilli (born 1972), Canadian hair stylist and entrepreneur
