= Eugénie Trochu =

French journalist (born 1988)

- Born: November 11, 1988 (age 37)
- Occupation: Journalist
- Title: Head of Editorial Content, Vogue France (2021–2024)

Eugénie Trochu (born 11 November 1988), is a French journalist and fashion editor, Trochu is an editor at Who What Wear and previously served as the head of editorial content of Vogue France from 2021 to 2024.

== Early life ==
Trochu was born on 11 November 1988. She lived in Normandy until age 17 when she moved to Paris, studying literature and journalism at the Université Paris-Sorbonne.

== Career ==
Trochu began her career as an intern at a TV station, before interning at American Vogue and later joining Vogue Paris. Prior to her appointment of head of editorial content she served as the fashion and market editor at Vogue Paris and fashion editor for the Vogue Paris website, Trochu was key to expanding the magazines digital presence. In September 2021, she was named Head of Editorial Content at Vogue Paris as part of sweeping changes that saw Condé Nast focus on digital content. Trochu oversaw the rebrand of the magazine from Vogue Paris to Vogue France.

In December 2024, Trochu exited Vogue France, Claire Thomson-Jonville replaced Trochu as the magazines new Head of Editorial Content. Following her departure from Vogue France she became an editor at Who What Wear.

Media offices
| Preceded by Emmanuelle Alt | Head of Editorial Content at Vogue France; 2021–2024 | Succeeded by Claire Thomson-Jonville |
