= Emmanuelle Alt =

French fashion editor (born 1967)

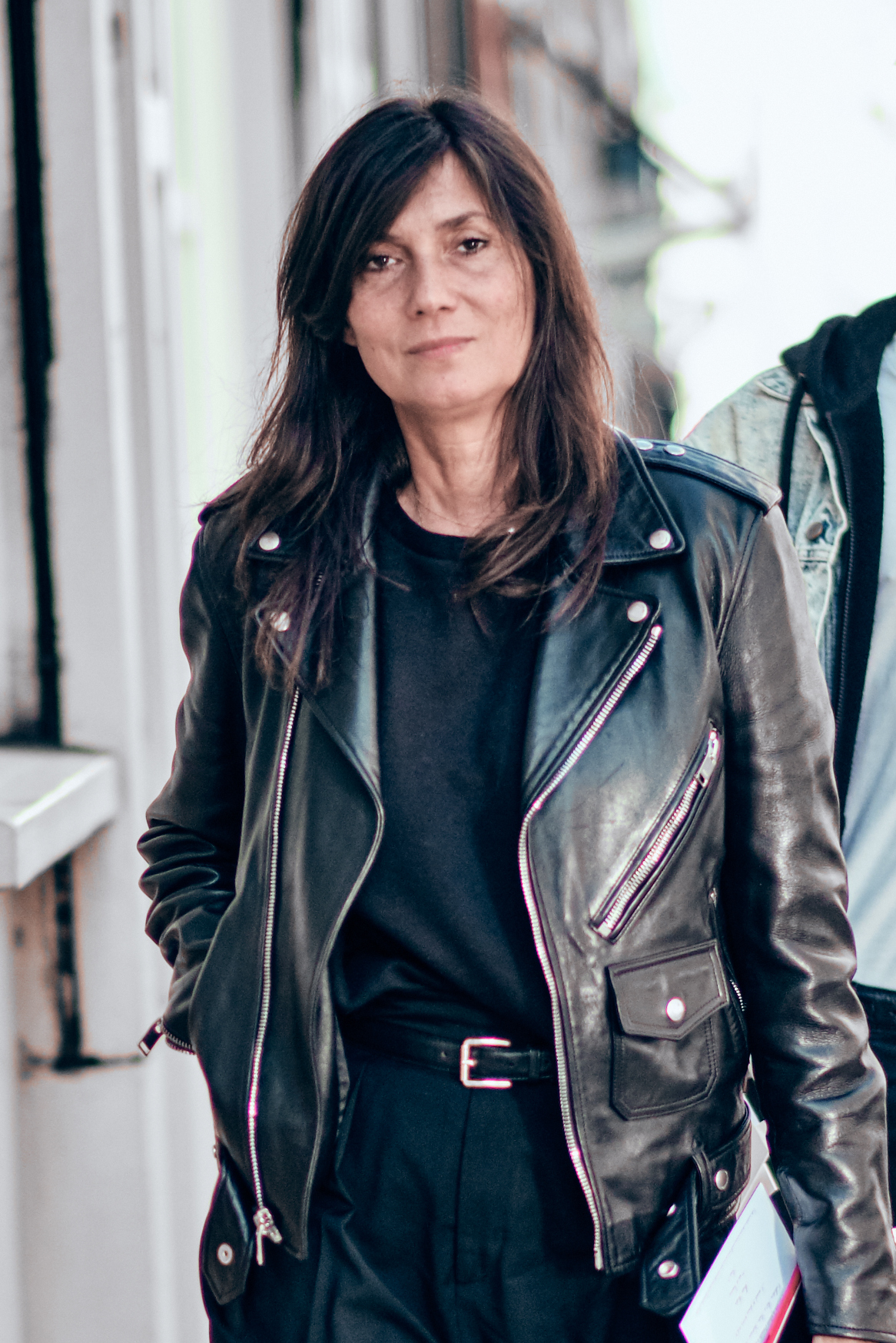
- Alt in 2019
- Born: 18 May 1967 (age 59); Paris, France
- Occupation: Fashion editor
- Employer: Condé Nast Publications
- Spouse: Franck Durand
- Children: 2
- Website: emmanuellealt.com

Emmanuelle Alt (born 18 May 1967) is a French fashion editor who was the editor-in-chief of Vogue Paris from February 2011, succeeding Carine Roitfeld, to May 2021. She is currently a regular contributor to Harper's Bazaar France, Holiday, and M Le Magazine du Monde.

== Early life and education ==
Alt's mother, Françoise, was a Lanvin and Nina Ricci model in the 1960s and '70s. Alt herself studied at the Institut de l'Assomption in Paris.

== Career ==
Alt became fashion director of Vogue France in 2000, when Roitfeld assumed the chief editor's position and hired Alt directly from Mixte magazine.

Prior to Mixte, she held positions at French ELLE (starting in 1984, she was only 17 years old) and then at 20 Ans where she became the editor-in-chief in 1993.

During Roitfeld's tenure the publication's 2010 circulation rose from 100,000 to 140,000, during the 2008 financial crisis. The increase was probably encouraged by the magazine's content – much of it styled by Alt as well as Roitfeld – in a provocative manner that included a great deal of nudity and sadomasochistic appurtenances.

Alt's annual salary at French Vogue is about US$300,000 compared to the yearly US$2-million (in 2005) of her counterpart, American Vogue editor-in-chief Anna Wintour. However, the circulation of the American edition at 1 million-plus dwarfs that of the French edition of the publication.

Alt's first issue at the helm was April 2011. About her intentions for the future content of Vogue France, she stated: "I don't think there should be radical changes". And she intends to remain with the magazine's past stable of photographers, such as David Sims, Mert and Marcus, Mario Testino, and Bruce Weber. In July 2013 she declared to Huffington Post that "London and Paris are worlds apart".

== Style ==
Alt wears jeans while eschewing dresses and skirts. She is often found dressed in her signature blazers or jackets, paired with skinny jeans and towering heels. In a December 2020 interview, she said that her favorite model right now is Malika Louback.

== Personal life ==
Alt has two children, Antonin and Françoise, who were 13 and 6 years old when Alt assumed her new position. Her husband, also in the fashion business, is Franck Durand, the artistic director of Isabel Marant.

Alt does not smoke or drink alcohol. She states that she doesn't "look after [herself]," refraining from exercise and visiting a hairdresser.

Media offices
Preceded by Carine Roitfeld	Editor-in-Chief of Vogue Paris; 2011–2021	Succeeded by Eugénie Trochu
