= Piero Piazzi =

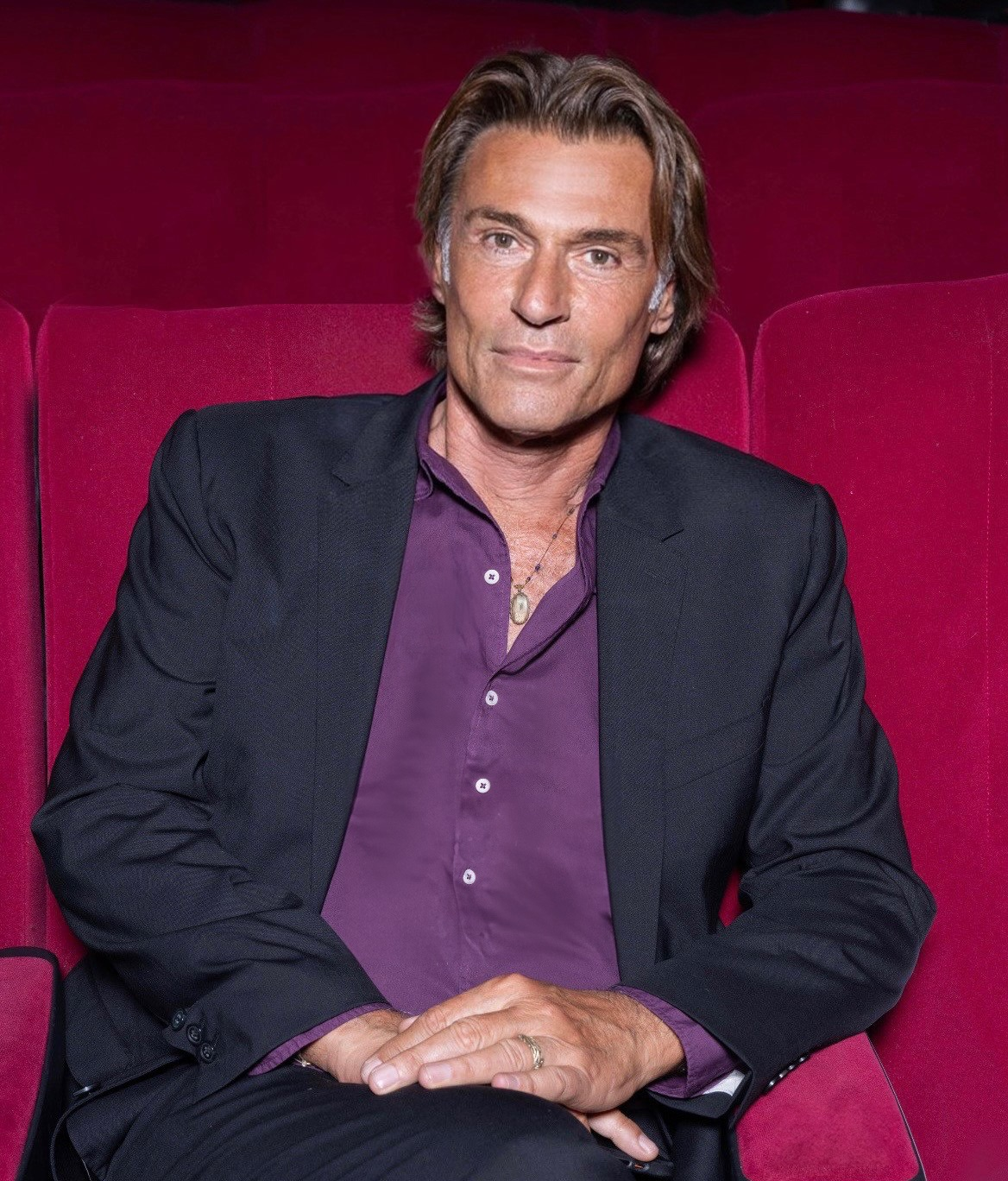
- Piazzi in 2023
- Born: 31 August 1963 (age 63); Bologna, Italy
- Known for: Fashion modelling manager, talent scout

Piero Piazzi (born 31 August 1963) is an international fashion modelling manager and talent scout. He is the president of the Women Management Milan agency. Piazzi collaborated with Mariacarla Boscono, Carla Bruni, Monica Bellucci, Naomi Campbell and Marpessa Hennink, among others.

== Biography ==
Piero Piazzi was born in Bologna and spent his childhood between Italy and the United States, where he spent his summers. After completing his education at a technical college in Bologna, he studied law at the University of Bologna.

Piazzi started his career as a model in 1978, meeting Rosanna Armani, who introduced him to her brother Giorgio Armani. At the age of 17, he signed his first modelling contract with the agency Beatrice di Milano. As a model, he worked with Gianni Versace, Valentino Garavani and Gianfranco Ferré, among others.

In 1982, he moved to the United States and worked for fashion brands such as Calvin Klein, Valentino, Gianfranco Ferré and shot with photographers such as Richard Avedon, Giampaolo Barbieri and Herb Ritts. In 1985, Piazzi shifted from being a model to managing.

From 1990 to 2000, he was director of the Riccardo Gay agency in Milan where he discovered and supported Mariacarla Boscono.

Piazzi joined Women Management Milano, the largest modelling agency in Italy, with offices in Paris and New York as director in 2003, where he became president in 2017.

In 2017, Piazzi was appointed Elite Milano's president and Europe's business coordinator for Elite World.

In September 2018, Piazzi took on the role of president of Women Model Management Worldwide.

He received the Lifetime Achievement Award and the Elio Fiorucci Award at the 19th edition of the Chi è Chi Awards in 2019.

In July 2021 Piazzi was awarded the Lifetime Achievement Award at the XXII Tao Awards.

In 2023, in Rome at the headquarters of the European Parliament, he was awarded by Makaziwe Mandela, Nobel Peace Prize winner Nelson Mandela's daughter, the La Moda Veste la Pace award for his humanitarian efforts.

Piazzi has served as president of the association of modelling agencies Assem. He worked on creating meetings with politicians in Rome to outline a code of ethics for the modelling industry in Italy.

In May 2024, in collaboration with the brand Oratio, Piero launched "Piero Piazzi for Oratio," a capsule collection consisting of essential items including a silk shirt, a silk day pajama set, linen shorts, linen trousers, and a suede bag. Piero donated the entire collaboration fee to To.Get.There, the ETS of which he is a co-founder and sole ambassador.

== Public activities ==
In 1996, Piazzi arranged the charity event called "Models, Too, Have a Heart" ("Anche le modelle hanno un cuore"), in collaboration with the Anlaids organization to raise funds for the fight against HIV. Naomi Campbell and Kate Moss supported his initiative.

He is the founder and ambassador of the non-profit association To Get There ETS, which helps to supply aid to orphaned and HIV-positive children in Uganda and South Sudan.

Piazzi is an ambassador and volunteer for Progetto Itaca, a foundation that promotes information, prevention, support and rehabilitation programs aimed at people with Mental Health disorders and their families.

Piazzi was also the ambassador for The Children for Peace Onlus, an NGO that works in Uganda, Mali, Lebanon, Palestine and Colombia to help orphaned, abandoned, sick and extremely poor children and their families.

== Personal life ==
After five years of living together, in 2006, he married Silvia Giusfredi from whom he separated in March 2024.
