= Mario Verrilli =

Canadian celebrity hairstylist (born 1972)

Mario Verrilli (born October 1, 1972) is a Canadian celebrity hairstylist and entrepreneur.

== Career ==
Mario Verrilli is a hairstylist whose work has appeared in Canada’s top fashion and beauty magazines including FLARE, Glow and Wish. His client list has included supermodel Daria Werbowy Daria Werbowy, many of Toronto’s top working models, CBC's Anne-Marie Mediwake and the members of The Pussycat Dolls, just to name a few.

Verrilli is the owner of Onaré, a hair salon in Mississauga, Ontario, Canada. Through his work as a hairdresser, both in his salon and with celebrity clients, he developed Saijojo, a line of eco-friendly hair care products that would still perform and could be used in his salon and on set. Using corn starch as a revolutionary new form of polymer, instead of plastic for hold, the styling products give hair hold and at the same time, are completely biodegradable. All products are sulfate and paraben free.

== Early career ==
Verrilli began his career in the beauty industry in Sudbury, Ontario under the training of Roger Levesque, a protégé of Alexandre de Paris and later Frank Marasco, a member of Intercoiffure. From there he traveled and studied at leading beauty industry facilities such as Vidal Sassoon and Bumble and Bumble.

While serving as a judge in a Northern Ontario Model Search, he met Elmer Olsen, a model scout and a former hairdresser. Olsen was impressed by Verrilli’s training history and invited him to get in touch if he was ever in Toronto. When Verrilli moved to the Toronto area in 1999, he did get in touch. After one haircut, Olsen was so pleased, he started sending all his models to Verrilli. One of those models was Daria Werbowy Daria Werbowy, who became a regular client. Once her career began to take off, Verrilli styled her hair for three covers of Flare magazine, one of Canada's leading fashion magazines.

== Awards ==
Verrilli was named Contessa's Session Hairstylist of the Year in 2006. The Canadian Hairstylist of the Year Awards (the Contessas) are Canada’s longest-running and most prestigious awards honouring excellence and creativity in salons and among salon professionals across Canada. Verrilli was also a finalist at the 2011 Constessas for the Elite Master Hairdresser category, a by nomination only category.
