= Daria Werbowy =

Canadian fashion model (born 1983)

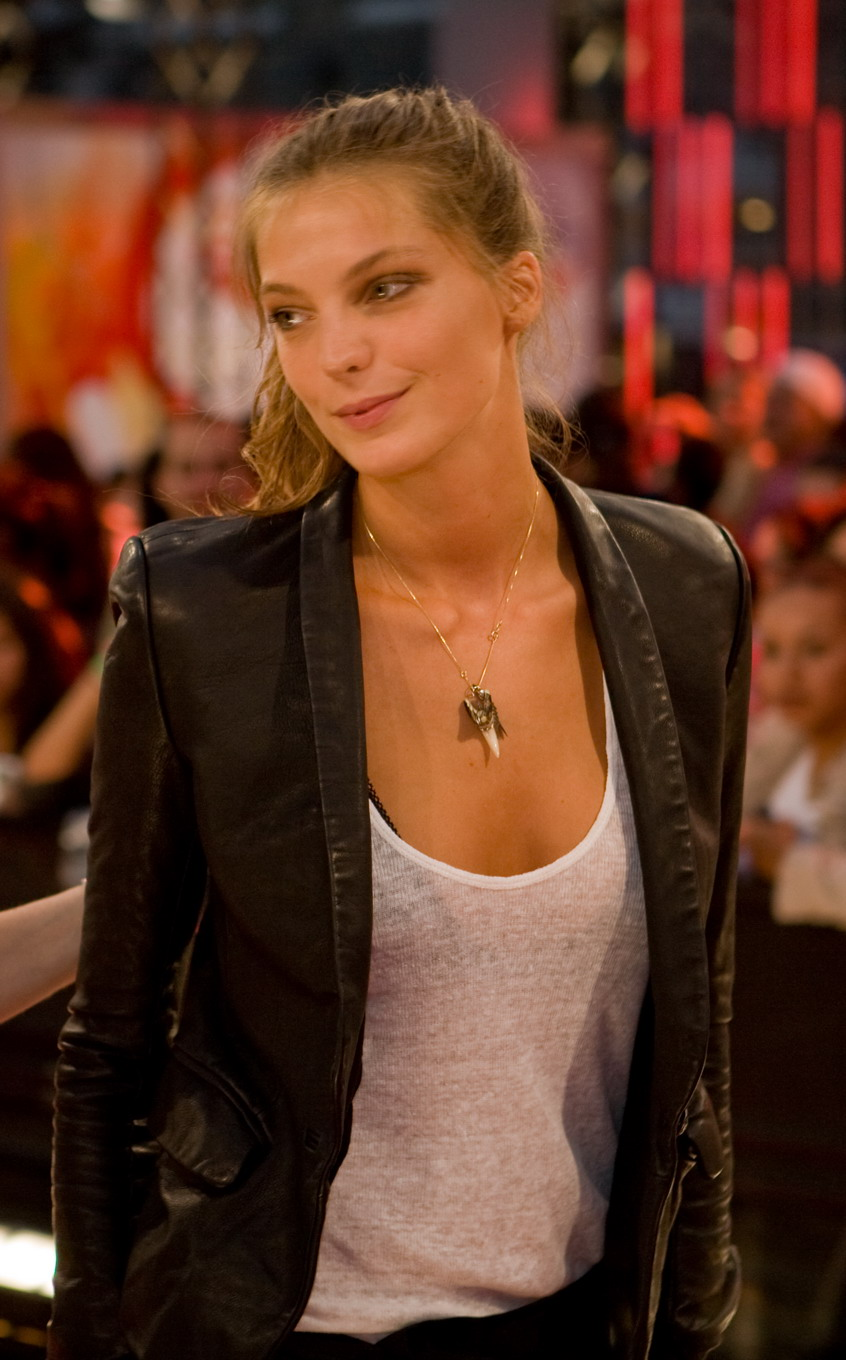
- Werbowy in 2008
- Born: 19 November 1983 (age 42); Kraków, Poland
- Citizenship: Canada
- Occupation: Model
- Years active: 2002–2016; 2023–present
- Modelling information
- Height: 1.80 m (5 ft 11 in)
- Hair colour: Brown
- Eye colour: Blue-green
- Agency: Uriel Management Company

Daria Werbowy (born 19 November 1983) is a Canadian fashion model. She became a spokesmodel for the French beauty brand Lancôme in 2005. According to Forbes, Werbowy has appeared on over 50 international Vogue covers. She retired after ten years in fashion while still one of the industry's top models. In a retrospective, Vogue dubbed her the "ultimate model muse."

== Personal life ==
Werbowy was born into an ethnic Ukrainian family in Poland. She has a brother and a sister. When she was three years old, the family moved to Mississauga, a suburb of Toronto, Canada, to escape the generational effects the World Wars had on them. Werbowy considers herself grateful to Canada as she likely would not have had the same opportunities living in Europe.

She is an avid sailor and spent three months in 2008, sailing across the Atlantic Ocean and the Mediterranean Sea. In 2011, she embarked on a two-month expedition from Guatemala, travelling around Central America to Costa Rica.

== Modelling career ==
Werbowy had never seriously considered modelling, being a tomboy, but it was frequently suggested to her by strangers. At age 14 and 5'11" in stature, she was signed by a local Toronto agency, Susan J. Model & Talent Management, and won a national modelling contest.

After switching to Elite Model Management, Werbowy landed several prominent bookings in Canada, but achieved little international success. Werbowy lived in England and Greece, where she did not find much work. Her first runway season was disrupted, and her bookings canceled due to the terrorist attacks on 9/11 in New York City. Thus, she went to Europe. After an exhausted eight months, Werbowy returned to Canada. She gave modelling a final shot as a means to fund her art school education, saying, "I returned to New York, met my agent and the next day I had an exclusive deal with Prada. From then on, it was all a bit of a blur."

When the Elite Toronto's head scout, Elmer Olsen, started his own agency, Werbowy followed and her career began to flourish. Within a few years, and under the guidance of IMG Models, Werbowy gained established her career internationally.

Werbowy holds the record for opening and closing the most shows in one season. In her first season, Fall/Winter 2003, Werbowy achieved two of modelling's highest feats: the cover of Vogue Italia, thrice (in July, August and October), and Prada's Fall/Winter ad campaign. In 2005, she was signed a contract with Lancôme, after a bidding war between them and Victoria's Secret which would have made her one of the brands Angels.

She has appeared on the cover of magazines such as international editions of Vogue, Elle, Harper's Bazaar, V, W, Marie Claire, Allure, Glamour, and Numéro.

Werbowy has walked the runways for Balenciaga, Givenchy, Dior, Tom Ford, Chloé, Marc Jacobs, Gucci, Versace, Miu Miu, Alexander McQueen, Prada, John Galliano, Louis Vuitton, Yves Saint Laurent, DKNY, Ralph Lauren, Chanel, Stella McCartney, Dolce & Gabbana, Karl Lagerfeld, Carolina Herrera, La Perla, Max Mara, Calvin Klein, Missoni, Zac Posen, Moschino, Oscar De La Renta, Roberto Cavalli, Tommy Hilfiger, Valentino, Fendi, Jean Paul Gaultier, Burberry, Celine, Hermès, Michael Kors, Balmain, and Lanvin.

She has appeared in advertising campaigns for Chanel, Yves Saint Laurent, Gucci, Hermès, Prada, Missoni, Versace, Celine, Louis Vuitton, Roberto Cavalli, Valentino, Dior, Lancôme, Zara, Balmain, Jean Paul Gaultier, David Yurman, Salvatore Ferragamo, Hugo Boss, Isabel Marant, DSquared2, Loewe, Diane Von Furstenberg, Mango, Balenciaga, Tiffany & Co., AG Adriano Goldschmied, H&M, and Bloomingdale's.

Photographed by Steven Meisel, she was presented on the September 2004 cover of American Vogue as one of the "Models of the Moment". In July 2007, Forbes listed Werbowy as the ninth-highest-earning model in the world after Karolina Kurkova, Natalia Vodianova, Carolyn Murphy, Alessandra Ambrosio, Adriana Lima, Heidi Klum, Kate Moss and Gisele Bündchen. Her earnings between June 2006 and June 2007 were in the order of $3.5 million.

On September 6, 2008, she was inducted into Canada's Walk of Fame. She is the second Canadian model, after Linda Evangelista, to have a star on the Canadian Walk of Fame. Earlier that year, Werbowy launched a three-piece makeup collection by Lancôme for Sephora. The proceeds went to the Vik Muniz charity Centrao Especial for underprivileged youth in Brazil. Werbowy was one of the faces on one of the fourteen covers of V magazine September 2008 issue. Each cover boasts a headshot of a famous model, either from the new crop of leading models (Agyness Deyn, Lara Stone, Natasha Poly, Anja Rubik, etc.) or the supermodel era (Christy Turlington, Naomi Campbell, Eva Herzigová). The covers were photographed by duo Inez van Lamsweerde and Vinoodh Matadin.

Vogue Paris declared her one of the top 30 models of the 2000s.

Werbowy has had conflicted feelings about her professional life. In a 2013 issue of Interview she was quoted as saying:

"Sometimes I am still surprised that I'm a model and that people think I'm good-looking. I've gone through a lot of different phases on what I do and why I do it—morally and ethically. I've tortured myself about it, especially in dealing with success and money. I just had to learn to look at it as a job, as opposed to identifying myself as a model and thinking of myself as a part of this industry. I just thought, Okay, this is an opportunity to learn and see and meet people. Still, I am a Scorpio and I'm quite competitive. If I'm going to do something, I'm going to do it as best I can. I'm going to give it everything."

Werbowy was photographed alongside Lara Stone and Isabeli Fontana in the 2009 edition of the Pirelli Calendar photographed by Peter Beard and was also featured in the 2011 edition photographed by Karl Lagerfeld.

She ranked No. 6 on Forbes' "The World's Top-Earning Models" list, with estimated earnings of $4.5 million between May 2010 and May 2011.

For Vogue's September 2013 issue, in homage to her personal life in Ireland, Werbowy appeared in an editorial alongside American actor Adam Driver, photographed by Annie Leibovitz. In 2015, Werbowy fronted campaigns for Equipment, Salvatore Ferragamo and H&M. She also featured on the March and June covers of Vogue France. Werbowy ranked 12th on the 2015 Forbes list of highest-paid models, having earned an estimated US$4.5 million. In 2016, Werbowy appeared on the October cover of Grazia France.

In 2016, while still an in-demand model, Werbowy retired to pursue her interests in photography and sailing. In a retrospective of her career, Vogue dubbed Werbowy the "ultimate model muse" while noting her "chameleonic qualities" as a model and the importance of her "nonchalant attitude" to her success.

In 2023, Werbowy returned to modelling for a Gucci campaign by the brand's new creative director Sabato de Sarno.
