= Jacques Roitfeld =

Russian-born French film producer

- Born: 19 January 1889; Akkerman, Russian Empire
- Died: 1999 (aged 109–110); Paris, France
- Occupation: Producer
- Years active: 1946–1982 (film)
- Children: Wladimir Roitfeld; Georges Roitfeld
- Relatives: Julia Restoin Roitfeld (granddaughter); Vladimir Restoin Roitfeld (grandson)

Jacques Roitfeld (19 January 1889 – 1999) was a Russian-born French film producer.

He is the father of Wladimir Roitfeld and Georges Roitfeld and the great-grandfather of Vladimir Restoin Roitfeld and Julia Restoin Roitfeld

== Selected filmography ==
- Goodbye Darling (1946)
- A Friend Will Come Tonight (1946)
- Eternal Conflict (1948)
- Return to Life (1949)
- Between Eleven and Midnight (1949)
- Old Boys of Saint-Loup (1950)
- Young Love (1951)
- She and Me (1952)
- Charming Boys (1957)
- Folies-Bergère (1957)
- Agent 077: From the Orient with Fury (1965)
- Aces High (1976)

== Bibliography ==
- Goble, Alan. The Complete Index to Literary Sources in Film. Walter de Gruyter, 1999.
