= Carine Roitfeld =

French fashion editor (born 1954)

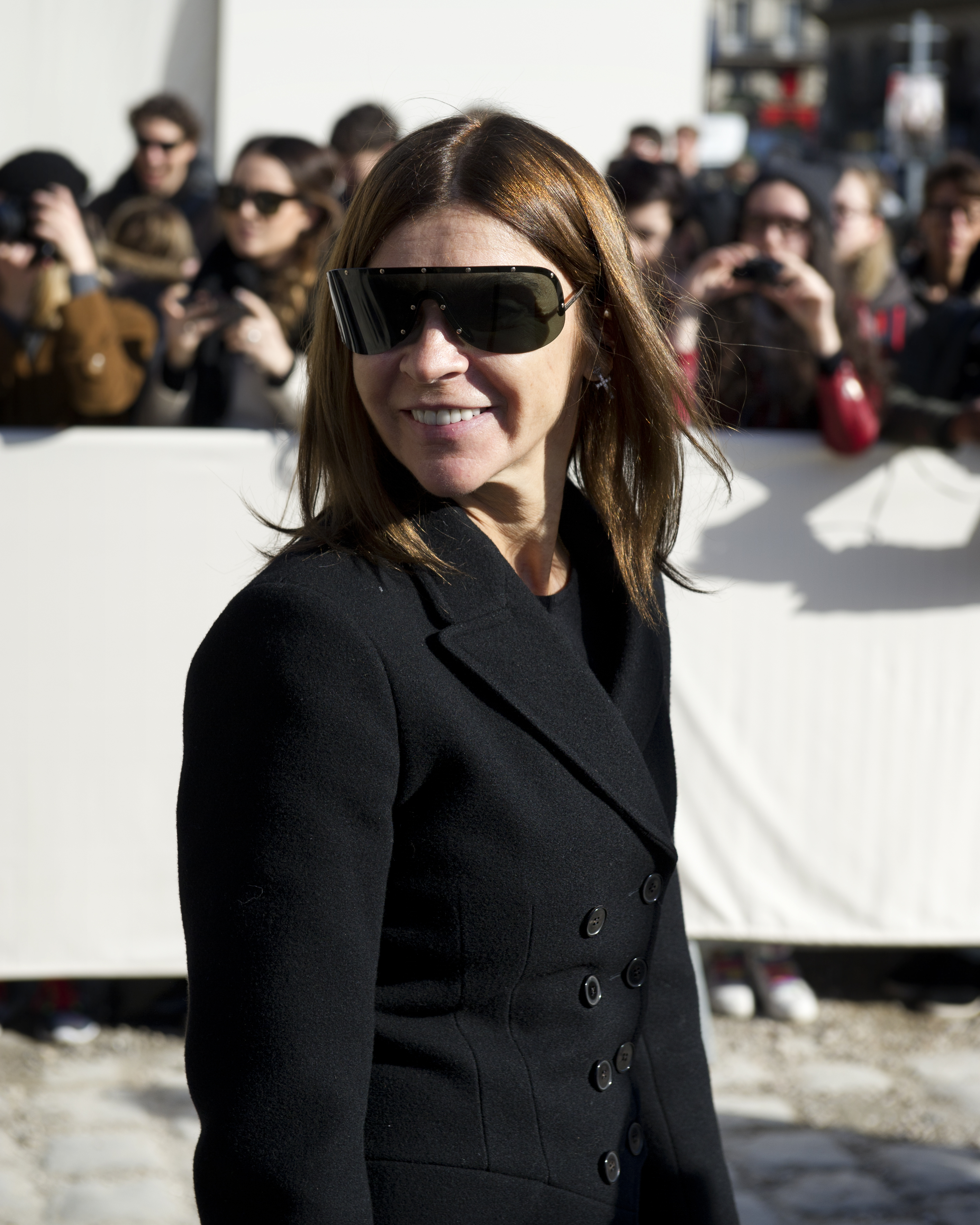
- Roitfeld in 2014
- Born: 19 September 1954 (age 71); Paris, France
- Occupations: Fashion editor; stylist; model
- Years active: 1972–present
- Partner: Christian Restoin
- Children: Julia Restoin Roitfeld; Vladimir Restoin Roitfeld
- Relatives: Jacques Roitfeld
- Website: carineroitfeld.com

Carine Roitfeld (French pronunciation: [ka.ʁin ʁwat.fɛld]; born 19 September 1954) is a French fashion editor, former fashion model, and writer. She is the former editor-in-chief of Vogue Paris, a position she held from 2001 to 2011. In 2012, she became founder and editor-in-chief of CR Fashion Book, a bi-annual print magazine headquartered in New York City.

== Early life ==
Roitfeld was born in Paris, France. Her father, Yakov Motelevich Roitfeld (in France – Jacques Roitfeld), was born in Akkerman (Bessarabia Governorate), one of five children (four brothers and a sister) in the family of the owner of the grocery and Moscow shop Motel Itsikovich Roitfeld. He received his law degree in Odessa and practiced law in St. Petersburg, Baku and Odessa. In 1923 he emigrated from Russia at the age of 34, moved to Austria, in 1925 then to Germany, and after the Nazis came to power – to Paris. He had two children from his first marriage, the second had a daughter, Karina, who was 34 years younger than her older brother. Roitfeld herself described her mother as a "classic Frenchwoman", she called her father "an idol", emphasizing that he was always far away.

== Career ==
=== Modeling and early styling ===
At 18, Roitfeld began modeling, having been scouted on a street in Paris by a British photographer's assistant. "I wasn't a star", she says. "I was just booked for junior magazines". She became a writer and then a stylist for French Elle.

While she was working as a freelance stylist, her daughter, Julia, was in a children's fashion shoot for Italian Vogue Bambini in 1990, photographed by Mario Testino. In a 2005 interview with 032c magazine, Roitfeld commented, "I was not the best stylist when I worked for fifteen years for French Elle, but certainly when I met Mario Testino something happened. The right person for me at the right time". Roitfeld and Testino soon after began working as a team, doing advertising work as well as shoots for American and French Vogue. Roitfeld went on to work as a consultant for and muse to Tom Ford at Gucci and Yves Saint-Laurent for six years and also contributed to the images of Missoni, Versace, and Calvin Klein.

=== Vogue Paris ===
She was approached by Condé Nast's International Chairman Jonathan Newhouse to edit Vogue Paris in 2001. In April 2006, there were rumors that Roitfeld was being approached by the Hearst Corporation to take over Glenda Bailey's editor-in-chief position at U.S. Harper's Bazaar.

Roitfeld is accused of lending a Balenciaga pre-collection to Max Mara as part of a consulting mission, with Max Mara allegedly drawing inspiration without ethical constraints. This led to her exclusion from the Balenciaga front rows. Additionally, during the ANDAM 2010, as the jury president, she is said to have favored the victory of Turkish designer Hakaan Yildirim due to the connection with the brand's artistic director, Mert Alas, a Vogue Paris-favored photographer.

On 17 December 2010, Roitfeld resigned after ten years at Vogue Paris to concentrate on personal projects. She left the magazine at the end of January 2011. She was succeeded at Vogue Paris on 1 February 2011 by Emmanuelle Alt, who had served as fashion director under Roitfeld.

=== Post-Vogue career ===
Roitfeld returned to freelance styling, working on both the Fall 2011 and Spring 2012 Chanel campaigns, took part in projects such as designing a window display for Barneys New York and compiled the large-format book Irreverent, published by Rizzoli in 2011. She joined Harper's Bazaar as global fashion director in 2012. The 2013 documentary Mademoiselle C documents Roitfeld's launch of her magazine CR, which she collaborated on with Shiona Turini. Roitfeld ended up forming a net worth of over two million. This was possible because her work would increase her value each time.

== Recognition ==
In January 2010, she was named in Tatler magazine's top-10 best-dressed list. She was listed as one of the fifty best-dressed over 50 by The Guardian in March 2013.

== Personal life ==
Roitfeld and partner Christian Restoin have been together since the late 1970s, although they are not married. Restoin was the creator of the Equipment clothing line, which he closed in 2001 after Roitfeld accepted the Vogue editorship. The couple have two children, Julia Restoin Roitfeld who was born on 12 November 1980 and Vladimir Restoin Roitfeld born in December 1984. Both were born in Paris. Julia graduated from Parsons School of Design in New York City in May 2006 and became the face of Tom Ford's fragrance Black Orchid in November 2006. Vladimir graduated from the University of Southern California School of Cinematic Arts in 2007.

== Filmography ==
Films
Year	Title	Director	Role	Note
2011	The Client	Fabien Constant	Herself	Documentary short
2013	Mademoiselle C	Fabien Constant	Herself	Documentary
2013	Some Words to Make a Change	Jan Lisman, Rosalie Mann	Herself	Short
2018	Westwood: Punk, Icon, Activist	Lorna Tucker	Herself	Documentary
2019	Martin Margiela: In His Own Words	Reiner Holzemer	Herself	Documentary

Television
Year	Title	Director	Role	Note
2004	Le grand journal de Canal+		Herself	Episode: "31 August 2004"
2009	The Day Before		Herself	Mini series, episode: "Proenza Schouler"
2010	The Vogue Paris Fashion Night Out	Fabien Constant	Herself	TV Movie
2010	Paris dernière		Herself	Episode: "9 October 2010"
2019	Quotidien		Herself	Episode: "15 May 2019"
2019	Clique		Herself	Episode: "Carine Roitfeld, Niro, Iris Mitternaere"
2020	Making the Cut		Herself	Guest judge, three episodes
2023	Quelle époque!		Herself	Episode: "#2.5"

Music Videos
Year	Title	Artist	Role	Note
2026	SS26	Charli XCX	Herself	

Media offices
Preceded by Joan Juliet Buck	Editor-in-Chief of Vogue Paris; 2001–2011	Succeeded by Emmanuelle Alt
Preceded by n/a	Editor-in-Chief of CR Fashion Book; 2012–present	Succeeded by current
