= Vladimir Restoin Roitfeld =

French-American businessman

Vladimir Restoin Roitfeld is a French-American fashion executive, publisher, and media entrepreneur. Since 2012, he has been the President of CR Fashion Book Ltd., the media company that publishes the namesake biannual style magazine founded by his mother, Carine Roitfeld. He leads business strategy, business development, partnerships, and extensions of the CR Fashion Book brand across publishing, licensing, and consulting. Under his leadership, CRFB launched CR MEN, a companion men's publication, launched its first international edition, CR Fashion Book Japan, and produced special projects, including an annual calendar, CR Women. Roitfeld is also President of CR Studio, a creative and production agency that he launched with clients ranging from Christian Dior and Chanel to Yeezy and Philipp Plein. In 2025, he founded and launched PLAYERS, a media platform centered on fashion, sport, and contemporary culture, and serves as its Editor-in-Chief.

== Early life ==
Roitfeld was born in Paris, France. He is the son of Christian Restoin and Carine Roitfeld, French journalist, fashion stylist, and the former editor-in-chief of French Vogue. He has an older sister, Julia Restoin Roitfeld. Roitfeld's godfather is photographer Mario Testino.

== Education ==
Roitfeld moved to New York City at age 17 to study at NYU before graduating from the University of Southern California School of International Relations and Cinematic Arts in 2007. Subsequently, he worked as an assistant producer for Paramount Pictures, before making the transition into the art world.

== Career ==
Prior to CRFB, Restoin Roitfeld served as the founder and director of Feedback Ltd., a Manhattan-based private art dealership that staged exhibitions with artists such as Andy Warhol, Peter Lindbergh, Tom Wesselmann, and Richard Hambleton. He is a graduate of the University of Southern California, where he earned degrees in business, International Relations, and Cinema & Television.

Roitfeld was inspired by "pop-up" galleries, in which museum-style exhibitions have been installed in industrial spaces in New York, London, Paris, and Milan. He has worked on exhibitions with the Moscow Museum of Modern Art, Sotheby's S2 Gallery and Phillips de Pury. In 2012 Roitfeld created a private art dealership headquartered in New York.

At the 17th annual Cinema Against Aids amfAR gala in Cannes in 2010, Roitfeld collaborated with amfAr-supporter Giorgio Armani on contributing to the organization's auction tent, which included an exhibition of works by Richard Hambleton. Roitfeld and Andy Valmorbida curated the collection and donated two rare pieces to the event. Auctioneer Simon de Pury moderated the bidding and the lots brought a combined total of $920,000. Restoin Roitfiled is interviewed on screen in the 2017 documentary on Hambleton, Shadowman.

In 2025, Restoin Roitfeld founded PLAYERS, a media platform focused on sport, fashion, and contemporary culture, where he serves as Editor-in-Chief. The publication operates across print and digital formats.
