= Fausto Sarli =

Italian fashion designer (1927–2010)

- Born: 9 May 1927; Naples, Italy
- Died: 9 December 2010 (aged 83); Rome, Italy
- Occupation: Fashion designer
- Spouse: Jolanda Sarli (divorced)
- Children: 5
- Website: http://www.sarlicouture.it

Fausto Sarli (9 May 1927 – 9 December 2010) was an Italian fashion designer.

== Biography ==
Sarli presented his first collection at the Palazzo Pitti in Florence in 1954 at the age of 29. In 1958, he established his own house, in Naples. He opened ateliers in Rome on Via Veneto and Milan. Sarli exported its collections mainly to the United States, Canada, Japan and the Persian Gulf countries. He created dresses for Ornella Vanoni, Carla Fracci, Valentina Cortese, Carla Bruni, Valeria Mazza, Mina, Elizabeth Taylor and Monica Bellucci. He worked with Ferdinando Sarmi.

Sarli was born in Naples in 1927 and died in Rome in 2010, aged 83. Italian President Giorgio Napolitano praised Sarli's originality, sobriety and quality in his message of condolence.
