= Laura Biagiotti =

Italian fashion designer (1943–2017)

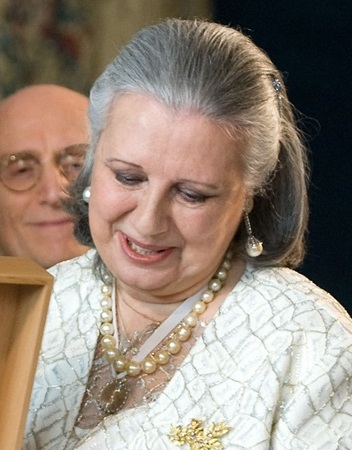
- Biagiotti in January 2011
- Born: 4 August 1943; Rome, Kingdom of Italy
- Died: 26 May 2017 (aged 73); Rome, Italy
- Occupation: Fashion designer
- Spouse: Gianni Cigna (died 1996)
- Awards: Order of Merit for Labour
- Website: laurabiagiotti.it

Laura Biagiotti (Italian: [ˈlaura bjaˈdʒɔtti]; 4 August 1943 – 26 May 2017) was an Italian fashion designer, and the founder of the House of Biagiotti.

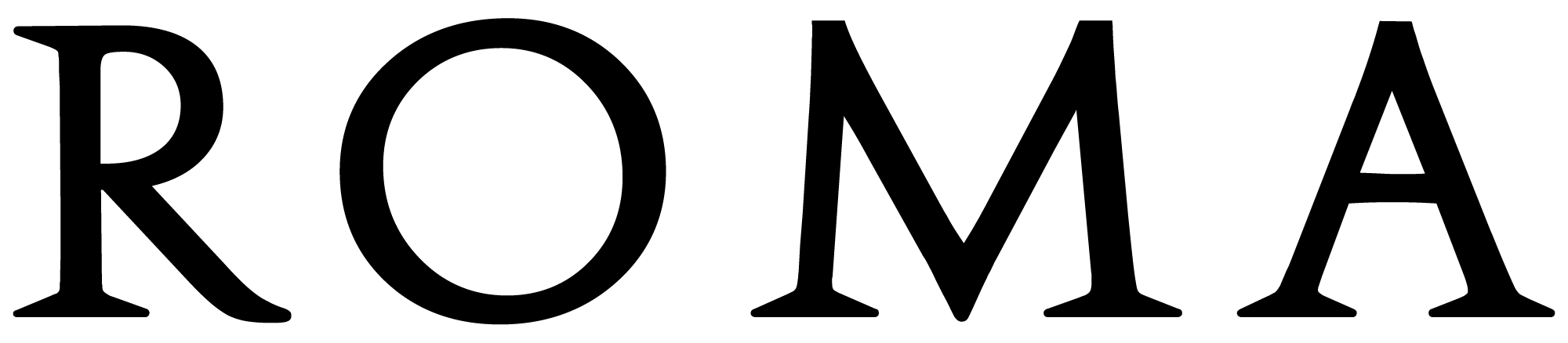
Roma Laura Biagiotti Logo

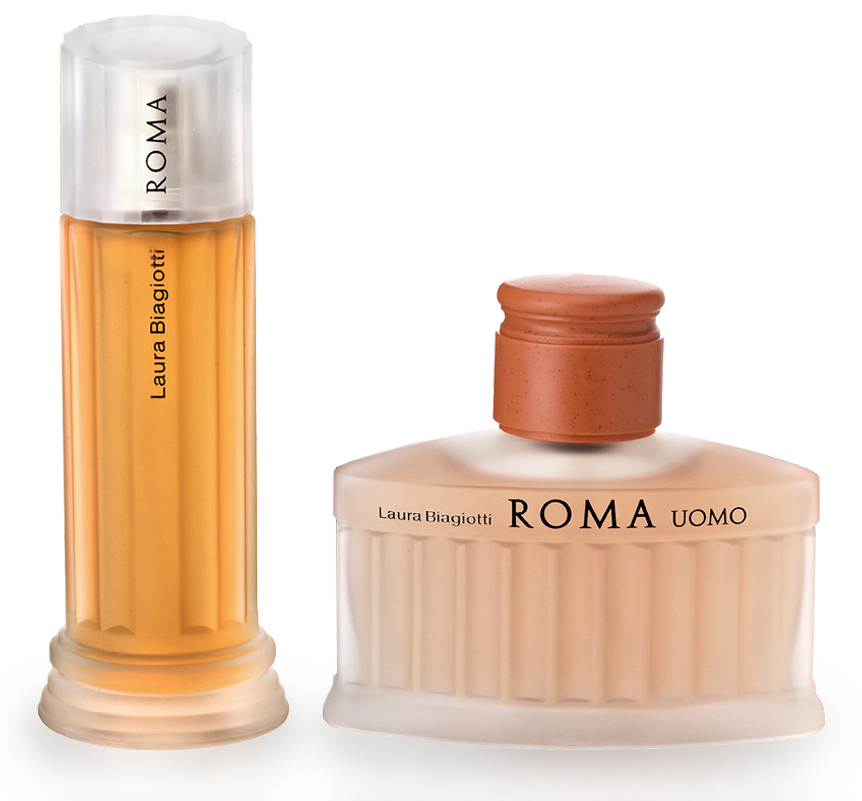
Roma (perfume), the first perfume created by Laura Bagiotti

== Early life ==
Biagiotti was born in Rome on 4 August 1943 to Giuseppe Biagiotti and his wife Laura. Her mother Delia Soldaini Biagiotti was a successful dressmaker who designed the uniforms for Alitalia staff in 1964 and collaborated with designers Roberto Capucci and Emilio Schuberth.

As a young student, she started to help out at her mother's atelier.

While studying archeology at Rome University, Biagiotti abandoned her academic career to focus on fashion design. She worked with her mother for several years during which she met her future husband Gianni Cigna. She entered into a business partnership with Cigna and opened her first store in Florence.

== House of Biagiotti ==
Biagiotti had her first fashion show in 1972.

The House of Biagiotti is listed among the largest fashion houses in Italy. Its products include women's wear, men's wear, accessories and watches.

Biagiotti moved to Beijing and, in April 1988, was the first Italian designer to present a collection in China.

In 1995, she received an award from the President of Italy for her contributions to fashion and later the Marco Polo award from the Chinese government for promoting fashion in China. She also received the Leonardo Prize in Italy. The Italian post office issued a 41 Euro cent stamp with her name in 2002.

She received the America Award of the Italy-USA Foundation in 2011.

Laura's daughter Lavinia Biagiotti Cigna entered the family business in 1997 and became the company's vice president in 2005.

== Private life ==
From 1980 until her death in 2017, Biagiotti lived and worked in the Roman countryside, in the restored 11th-century Marco Simone Castle. She lived there with her husband Gianni Cigna until his death in August 1996.

== Awards ==
- In 1992, Laura Biagiotti received the Woman of the Year award in New York. In 1993, she received the Marco Polo award in Beijing for having brought Italian industry to China.
- In 1995, Laura Biagiotti received the Knights of Labor award from Italian President Oscar Luigi Scalfaro for her long career in the fashion industry and her contribution in making Italian fashion famous worldwide.

Laura Biagiotti was the President of the Leonardo Committee, composed of prominent Italians in the fields of industry, art and culture, from 2000 to 2008, and became its Honorary President in 2009.

- In 2001 she was the first designer to receive the Prix Femmes d'Europe for her contribution in promoting women's participation in the development of a unified Europe.
- In 2002 received several the Marisa Bellisario Award and the Lifetime Achievement Award of the National Council of Italian Fashion, which was presented during the Donna sotto le stelle fashion show. That year the Italian Postal Service issued a 41 Euro cent stamp honoring the designer and portraying a long dress inspired by classic Roman style.
- Biagiotti compiled a chapter on Italian fashion for the Treccani Encyclopedia in the Book of the Year 2004.
- In July 2004 Rome Mayor Walter Veltroni presented Biagiotti with the Lupa Capitolina award.
- In February 2006 Laura's daughter Lavinia accepted an award in Moscow on her mother's behalf from Ksenia Gorbaciova, the granddaughter of President Mikhail Gorbachev, celebrating Laura's being the first Italian designer to present a collection in Russia, in 1995.
- In September 2007 Laura Biagiotti received the Crystal Lion Lifetime Achievement – Venice Casino Award at the conclusion of the 64th Venice International Film Festival.
- In January 2011 Laura Biagiotti was presented the Leonardo Award by the President of the Italian Republic, Giorgio Napolitano.
