= Arena Homme + =

Fashion magazine published in the UK

- Editor: Max Pearmain
- Art Director: Ben Kelway
- Categories: Men's Lifestyle, Fashion
- Frequency: Biannually
- Founded: 1994
- First issue: Spring/Summer 1994
- Country: United Kingdom
- Based in: London
- Language: English
- ISSN: 1353-1972

Arena Homme + is a fashion magazine for men published biannually since 1994. The first issue was published in Spring/Summer 1994. The founding editor-in-chief is Kathryn Flett. It is published by Ashley Heath and editor-in-chief is the stylist & former Dior Homme campaign model Max Pearmain. The current art director is Ben Kelway.

Arena Homme + came from the monthly Arena which itself was started out of The Face offices. Arena Homme + is also the 'brother' magazine to the women's fashion biannual Pop.
