= Equipment (clothing brand) =

Fashion label based in Los Angeles, California

Equipment is a fashion label currently based in Los Angeles, California. Originally launched in 1976 by Christian Restoin, husband of former Vogue Paris Editor-in-chief Carine Roitfeld, the brand is currently carried in over 60 countries and 600 retail doors, including two Equipment retail stores.

== History ==
Christian Restoin launched the brand in 1976. Restoin left the brand in 1998.

Equipment was re-launched in 2010 by Serge Azria, the older brother of Max Azria, head of the BCBG Max Azria Group empire, and has since been spotted on celebrities such as Kate Bosworth, Diane Kruger, and Anne Hathaway. In 2013, TA Associates acquired a 60% interest in Dutch LLC, parent company to Equipment and two related brands, Joie and Current/Elliott. The company was renamed as The Collected Group by 2017, and filed for bankruptcy protection in April 2021. The three brands were subsequently sold to Sunrise Brands in July of that year, and then to Republic Brands in December 2025.

== Retail ==
Equipment opened its first freestanding flagship location in New York's Soho neighborhood in December 2012, followed by a West Coast location in West Hollywood's Melrose Place shopping district.

== Collaborations ==
Notable brand collaborators include Los Angeles-based accessories designer, Clare Vivier, and French illustrator/influencer, Garance Doré.

== Campaigns ==
In 2013, Equipment partnered with Alison Mosshart and British guitarist Jamie Hince of The Kills.

In Fall 2014, Equipment partnered with model/photographer Daria Werbowy, giving her creative freedom to shoot and model in the brand's next three advertising campaigns.

In 2016, Equipment enlisted Daria Werbowy to photograph Kate Moss for Equipment's Spring advertising campaign.
