= Pop (fashion magazine) =

British fashion magazine

- Kate Moss on one of two covers for Autumn 2006.
- Editor-in-Chief: Dasha Zhukova
- Categories: Fashion Magazine
- Frequency: Twice yearly
- Circulation: 80,000+ per issue
- First issue: 2000
- Company: Bauer
- Country: United Kingdom
- Based in: London
- Language: English
- Website: thepop.com

Pop is a British fashion magazine co-founded in 2000 by Ashley Heath and editor Katie Grand. The initial creative directors for the magazine were Lee Swillingham and Stuart Spalding. Pop is published bi-annually.

== History ==
In 1999, the publishing house Emap enticed Grand to leave Dazed & Confused and invited her to work on the cult magazine The Face, as the magazine's official fashion director. At the same time Emap offered her a position as Editor-in-Chief of an as-yet unnamed new magazine. The first issue of Pop was launched in September 2000. Grand said that her main concept was that "it to be really jolly. And pink — I was obsessed with it being pink."

Grand left Pop in 2008, along with creative directors Swillingham and Spalding, to establish a rival magazine, Love, published by Conde Nast.

Pop relaunched in an online digital format as THEPOP.COM. and the first issue under new management was released on 1 September 2009. Dasha Zhukova was hired as editor-in-chief with Ashley Heath as the Editorial Director and David Girhammar as an editor.

On 1 September 2010 Britney Spears appeared on the cover of the magazine for her first time.
