= Julia Restoin Roitfeld =

French creative director and designer (born 1980)

Julia Roitfeld
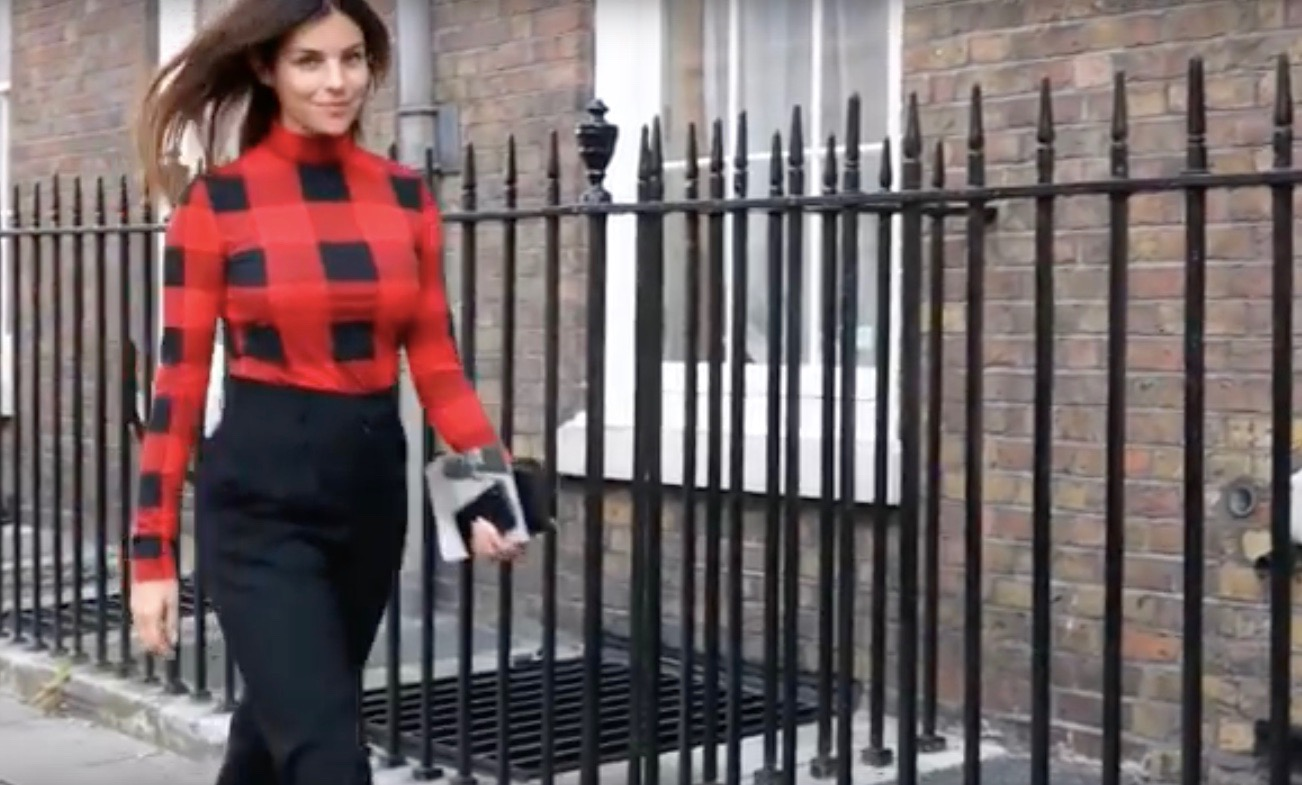
- Roitfeld in 2018
- Born: 12 November 1980 (age 45); Paris, France
- Education: Parsons School of Design
- Occupations: Creative director; designer
- Partner: Tim Wheeler (2018–present)
- Children: 2
- Parent: Carine Roitfeld
- Relatives: Vladimir Restoin Roitfeld (brother)

Julia Restoin Roitfeld (born 12 November 1980) is a French creative director and designer, based between New York City and London. She is the daughter of Carine Roitfeld and Christian Restoin.

== Early life ==
Roitfeld was born in Paris to Christian Restoin, founder of fashion label, Equipment, and Carine Roitfeld a fashion editor. Her younger brother Vladimir Restoin Roitfeld is an art dealer. As a child, Roitfeld took piano, dance, and horseback riding classes. At age 14, she got an internship at British magazine The Face. She attended Parsons Paris until 2004, when she moved to New York City to intern at design firm Baron & Baron. Shortly after, she transferred her credits to Parsons School of Design, graduating in 2006 with a BBA in Design Management. During that time she also had an internship at Craig McDean's studio.

== Personal life ==
Roitfeld has been dating songwriter, singer and guitarist for Northern Irish alternative rock band Ash, Tim Wheeler, since 2018. On September 9, 2021, they announced via Instagram that they were expecting a baby together. In February 2022, they announced the birth of their son George. Roitfeld has another child, a daughter named Romy with previous partner Robert Konjic, born in May 2012.
