= Vogue France =

French fashion magazine

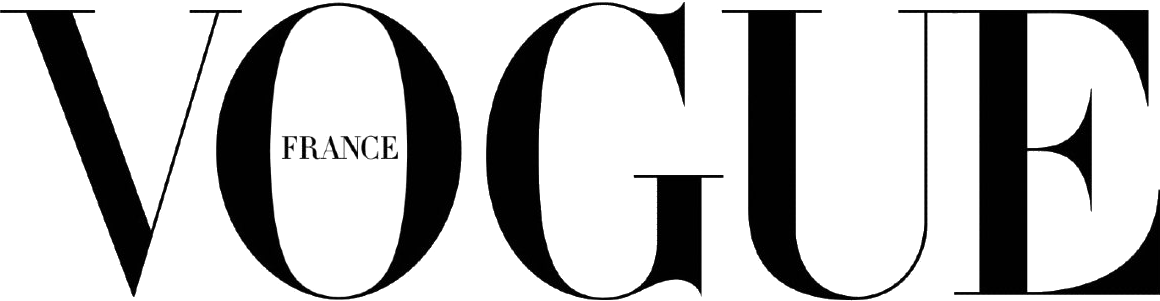

- 100th Anniversary cover (October 2021)
- Head of Editorial Content: Claire Thomson-Jonville
- Categories: Fashion
- Frequency: Monthly
- Publisher: Condé Nast
- Paid circulation: 998,271
- Total circulation: 1,000,615 (2025)
- First issue: April 1920
- Country: France
- Based in: Paris
- Language: French
- Website: vogue.fr
- ISSN: 0750-3628

Vogue France (stylised in all caps), formerly known as Vogue Paris, is a French monthly fashion magazine that covers ready-to-wear fashion, haute couture, beauty, culture, and lifestyle. Published by Condé Nast. Since 2025 Claire Thomson-Jonville has served as editor, previous editors include Joan Juliet Buck and Carine Roitfeld, among others.

Based in the 1st arrondissement neighbourhood of Paris. Vogue France began publication in 1920 as the French edition of Vogue. From 1940 to 1945, publication of the magazine was put on hold due to World War II.

== Background ==
Vogue France is the French edition of the American fashion magazine Vogue. The magazine is published ten times per year with merged June/July and December/January issues as is traditional for French fashion publications.

=== Editors ===
Editor	Start year	End year	Ref.
Editor-in-Chief
edited from the USA	1920	1922	
Cosette Vogel	1922	1927	
Mainbocher	1927	1929	
Michel de Brunhoff	1929	1954	
Edmonde Charles-Roux	1954	1966	
Françoise de Langlade	1966	1968	
Francine Crescent	1968	1986	
Colombe Pringle	1987	1994	
Joan Juliet Buck	1994	2001	
Carine Roitfeld	2001	2011	
Emmanuelle Alt	2011	2021	
Head of Editorial Content
Eugénie Trochu	2021	2024	
Claire Thomson-Jonville	2025	present	

=== Editions ===
- Vogue Collections (since 2005)
- Vogue Beauté (from 1951 to 1952; from 1983 till closure)
- Vogue Décoration (from 1985 to 1992)
- Vogue Hommes (from 1973 to 1996; 2000 to 2021)
- Vogue Sport (1983 to 1986)

=== Circulation ===
Total Circulation (France and internationally)
Year	2013	2014	2015	2016	2017	2018	2019	2020	2021	2022	2023	2024	2025
Circulation	1,515,618	1,473,076	1,404,506	1,324,600	1,159,835	1,085,704	1,023,330	667,340	953,973	907,526	912,780	952,278	1,000,615

== History ==
=== 1920–54 ===
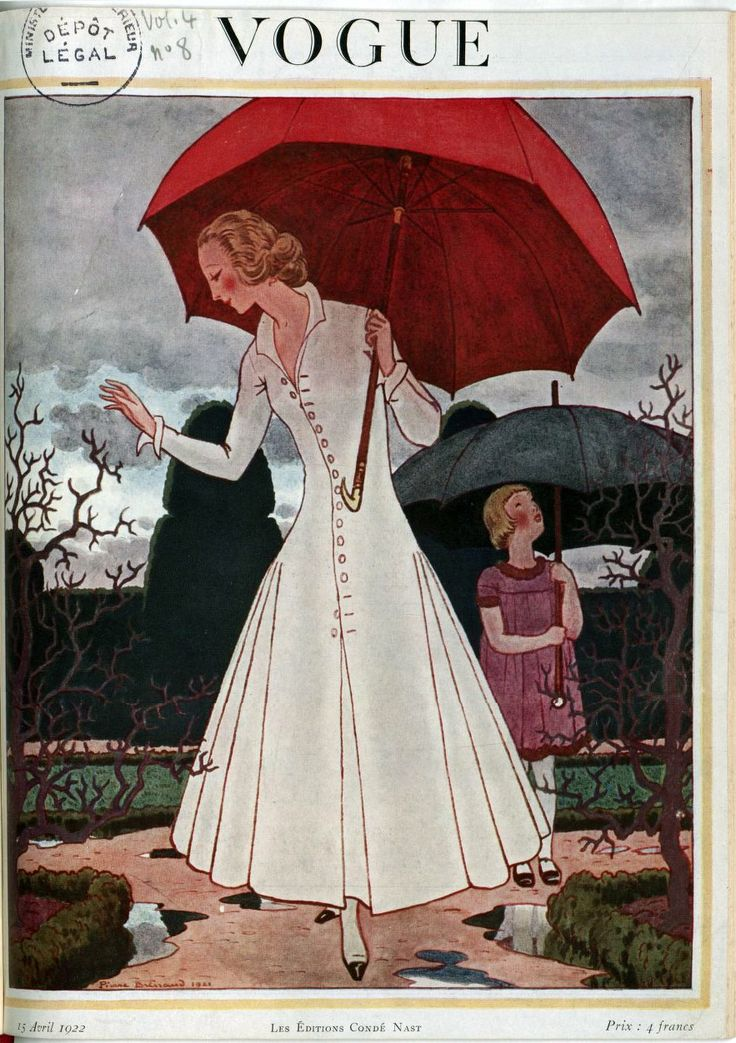
Cover of Vogue Paris (April 1922)

The French edition of Vogue was first issued on 15 June 1920, the first editor-in-chief being Cosette de Brunhoff (1886–1964). Her brother, Michel de Brunhoff (1892–1958) took over, following a brief period of Main Bocher (from 1927 to 1929) editing the magazine and Brunhoff served as editor-in-chief from 1929 until 1954. Duchess Solange d'Ayen (1898–1976) was a fashion editor of Vogue from the late 1920s until the early 1940s.

Publication of French Vogue was put on hold in 1940 after its permission to publish was not granted by the occupying Nazi authorities. The assets of the magazine and French Condé Nast's other fashion publication Le Jardin des Modes were liquidated and both publications were placed under the protection of the Tribunal de Commerce. During the publication pause Brunhoff created l'Album de la Mode du Figaro based in Monte Carlo to fill the market gap left from the closure of Vogue. Regular contributors to Vogue including Germaine Beaumont, Paul Valéry, Georges Duhamel, and illustrators Bernard Blossac, Pierre Mourgue, and Pierre Pagès all contributed to the publication. Vogue Paris restarted publication with a special 'Liberation' issue in early 1945.

=== Under Edmonde Charles-Roux (1954–66) ===
Edmonde Charles-Roux (1920–2016), who had previously worked at Elle and France-Soir, became the magazine's editor-in-chief in 1954. Charles-Roux was a great supporter of Christian Dior's "New Look", of which she later said, "It signalled that we could laugh again - that we could be provocative again, and wear things that would grab people's attention in the street." In August 1956, the magazine issued a special ready-to-wear (prêt-à-porter) issue, signaling a shift in fashion's focus from couture production.

She was dismissed from Vogue in 1966, as the result of a conflict for wanting to place black model Donyale Luna on the cover of the magazine. When later asked about her departure, Charles-Roux refused to confirm or deny this account. A black model on the cover of French Vogue did not come until 1988 when Naomi Campbell was featured on the cover.

=== 1968–2000: Crescent, Pringle, and Buck ===
Francine Crescent (1933–2008), whose editorship would later be described as prescient, daring, and courageous, took the helm of French Vogue in 1968. Under her leadership, the magazine became the global leader in fashion photography. Crescent gave Helmut Newton and Guy Bourdin, the magazine's two most influential photographers, complete creative control over their work. During the 1970s, Bourdin and Newton competed to push the envelope of erotic and decadent photography; the "prone and open-mouthed girls of Bourdin" were pitted against the "dark, stiletto-heeled, S&M sirens of Newton". At times, Bourdin's work was so scandalous that Crescent "laid her job on the line" to preserve his artistic independence. The two photographers greatly influenced the late-20th-century image of womanhood and were among the first to realize the importance of image, as opposed to product, in stimulating consumption. Through the power photography within fashion both Bourdin and Newton were able to create new avenues within the world of fashion as well as advance the image of Vogue.

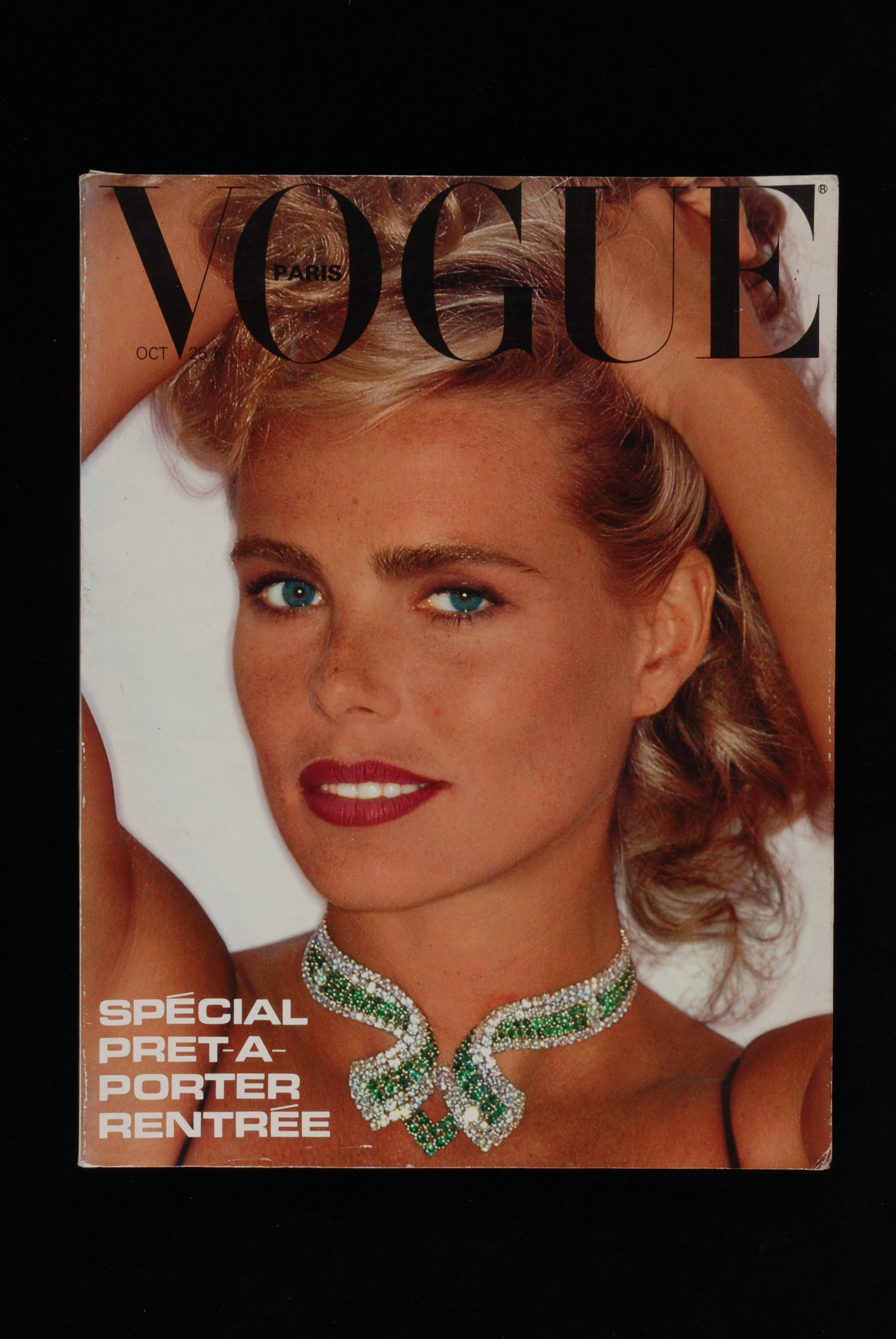
Cover of Vogue Paris, October 1980 - Margaux Hemingway by Helmut Newton

By the late 1980s, however, Newton and Bourdin's star power had faded, and the magazine was "stuck in a rut". Colombe Pringle replaced Crescent as the magazine's editor-in-chief in 1987. Under Pringle's watch, the magazine recruited new photographers such as Peter Lindbergh (1944–2019) and Steven Meisel, who developed their signature styles in the magazine's pages. Even still, the magazine struggled, remaining dull and heavily reliant on foreign stories. When Pringle left the magazine in 1994, word spread that her resignation had been forced.

Joan Juliet Buck, an American, was named Pringle's successor effective 1 June 1994. Her selection was described by The New York Times as an indication that Conde Nast intended to "modernize the magazine and expand its scope" from its circulation of 80,000. Buck's first two years as editor-in-chief were extremely controversial; many employees resigned or were fired, including the magazine's publishing director and most of its top editors. Though rumors circulated in 1996 that the magazine was on the verge of a shutdown, Buck persevered; during her editorship, the magazine's circulation ultimately increased 40 percent. Buck remade the magazine in her own cerebral image, tripling the amount of text in the magazine and devoting special issues to art, music, literature, and science. Juliet Buck announced her decision to leave the magazine in December 2000, after her return from a two-month leave of absence. The Sydney Morning Herald later compared her departure, which took place during Milan's fashion week, to the firing of a football coach during a championship game. Carine Roitfeld, who had been the magazine's creative director, was named as Buck's successor the next April.

=== Under Carine Roitfeld (2001–2011) ===
Roitfeld aimed to restore the magazine's place as a leader in fashion journalism (the magazine "hadn't been so good" since the 1980s, she said) and to [restore] its French identity. Her appointment, which coincided with the ascendance of young designers at several of the most important Paris fashion houses, "brought a youthful energy" to the magazine. By April 2002, she had rid the magazine of foreign staffers, making it "all French for the first time in many years". The magazine also underwent a redesign by the Paris-based design firm M/M (Paris). It aimed to make the title appear more hand-crafted and organic, particularly through the use of collage and hand-drawn fonts. Continuity was created through the use of loose theming for each issue, smooth pacing, and visual uniformity in the shopping pages.

The magazine's aesthetic evolved to resemble Roitfeld's (that is, "svelte, tough, luxurious, and wholeheartedly in love with dangling-cigarette, bare-chested fashion"). Roitfeld has periodically drawn criticism for the magazine's use of sexuality and humor, which she employs to disrupt fashion's conservatism and pretension. Roitfeld's Vogue is unabashedly elitist, "unconcerned with making fashion wearable or accessible to its readers". Models, not actresses promoting movies, appear on its cover. Its party pages focus on the magazine's own staff, particularly Roitfeld and her daughter Julia Restoin Roitfeld. Its regular guest-editorships are given to it-girls like Kate Moss, Sofia Coppola, and Charlotte Gainsbourg. According to The Guardian, "what distinguishes French Vogue is its natural assumption that the reader must have heard of these beautiful people already. And if we haven't? The implication is that that's our misfortune, and the editors aren't about to busy themselves helping us out." Advertising revenue rose 60 percent in 2005, resulting in the best year for ad sales since the mid-1980s. On 17 December 2010, Carine announced her departure from Vogue Paris effective 31 January 2011.

=== Under Emmanuelle Alt (2011–2021) ===
On 7 January 2011, Emmanuelle Alt, who had worked at the magazine as its fashion director since 2000 was announced as the new editor-in-chief. Under Alt the publication was simplified, the magazine was redesigned to eliminate "cluttered layouts and typography" along with the introduction of more feature articles. Her appointment was seen as the "safe" choice with The New York Times stating that it did not look like Condé Nast executives were looking for a change to the publication.

Valentina Sampaio was featured on the March 2017 cover and became the first transgender model to be featured on the cover of an edition of Vogue.

Alt was dismissed from her role as editor-in-chief in May 2021, this followed the firing of multiple high-profile Condé Nast staff members.

=== Under Eugénie Trochu and rebranding (2021–2024) ===
Eugénie Trochu was appointed as the Head of Editorial Content for Vogue Paris on 6 September 2021. The first issue under her leadership was November 2021 featuring Aya Nakamura on the cover. This was also the first issue of the magazine to be branded as Vogue France after 101 years as Vogue Paris.

=== Under Claire Thomson-Jonville (2025–present) ===
After overseeing the December 2024/January 2025 issue Claire Thomson-Jonville was appointed as the magazines Head of Editorial Content following Trochus departure. Under her leadership the magazine had a design overhaul and in February 2025 Alastair McKimm (ex-editor-in-chief of i-D) was appointed as the magazines Fashion and Image Director-at-Large. McKimm left the position following the December 2025/January 2026 issue.

The first Vogue France Wellness retreat occurred in June 2025 hosted by Thomson-Jonville and Deepak Chopra, Vogue called the three-day retreat 'A transformative journey to awaken your body, empower your mind and nourish your heart guided by Vogue France'. Speakers at the event will include Jessie Inchauspé and Léna Mahfouf. Thomson-Jonville previously ran the Out of State wellness retreats.

In 2025, the total yearly circulation of Vogue France passed one million for the first time since 2019.

== Vogue Hommes ==
Vogue Hommes was the men's version of Vogue Paris, first published from 1973 to 1996 and then from 2000 to 2021. It was published under various titles, primarily Vogue Hommes ('Vogue Men') but also as Vogue Hommes International Mode ('Vogue Hommes International Fashion'), Vogue Hommes International, Vogue Hommes Paris, and Vogue Paris Hommes International.

Vogue Hommes made its debut in March 1973 as Vogue Paris Hommes, on the cover was aviator and French resistance fighter Jean-Claude Brouillet. Within included several editorials by Helmut Newton along with a portrait of Helmut Newton by Alice Springs.

Jenny Mannerheim served as art director of Vogue Hommes from 2004 to 2006.

Vogue Hommes Japan launched in September 2008. It ceased publication in 2012 and Jun Kitada (president of Condé Nast Japan) stated "We intend to make maximum use of the experience gained in producing [Vogue Hommes Japan] by pouring this experience into ‘GQ Style [Japan]’ to ensure the ongoing development of a stylish fashion magazine that fits perfectly into the Japanese men’s market,".

=== Editors ===
- Jacqueline Degioanni
- Godfrey Deeny, 1995–1996
- Richard Buckley, 1999–2005
- Bruno Danto, 2005–2006
- Olivier Lalanne, 2006–2021

== See also ==
- List of Vogue France cover models
- List of Vogue France guest editors
- Vogue World 2024
