= Franca: Chaos and Creation =

- Directed by: Francesco Carrozzini
- Produced by: Steph Sciré; Francesco Carrozzini; Daniele Di Lorenzo; David Codikow
- Starring: Franca Sozzani
- Cinematography: Alexander Dynan
- Music by: Dan Heath
- Production company: Disarming Films
- Release date: September 2, 2016 (Venice Film Festival)
- Country: United States
- Language: Italian / English / French

Franca: Chaos and Creation is a 2016 documentary film directed by Francesco Carrozzini. The film focuses on his mother Franca Sozzani, editor-in-chief of Vogue Italia for nearly three decades, and highlights her groundbreaking influence on fashion editorials while also exploring the relationship between Sozzani and Carrozzini as mother and son. The film premiered on September 2, 2016, in the "Cinema nel Giardino" category at the 73rd Venice International Film Festival where it received early positive reviews from the fashion industry. It hosted its North American premiere during the 24th Hamptons International Film Festival in October 2016 and also screened at AFI Fest in Los Angeles on November 15, 2016. The film was picked up for distribution in the US by Bond/360. In September 2017, Carrozzini announced that the film would receive a special release in Italy on September 25–27, 2017 as part of Fashion Film Festival Milano and be available to stream worldwide on Netflix starting in October 2017.

== Synopsis ==
When Franca Sozzani took over as editor-in-chief of Vogue Italia at the end of the 80s, she started a fashion revolution. Shunning the conventional magazine covers and fashion spreads of the time, she explored subjects that had previously been off-limits. By skillfully mixing fashion, high concept art, and photography, she created some of the most iconic magazine covers of the past 25 years. Through interviews with some of her closest collaborators and friends, including Karl Lagerfeld, Bruce Weber, Baz Luhrmann, Courtney Love and others, director Francesco Carrozzini delivers an intimate portrait of his mother and a candid look at one of the most influential names in fashion.

== Cast ==
- Franca Sozzani
- Francesco Carrozzini
- Valentino
- Giancarlo Giammetti
- Deborah Turbeville
- Arianna Huffington
- Suzy Menkes
- Valerie Steele
- Jonathan Newhouse
- Farida Khelfa
- Bernard Henri-Levy
- Donatella Versace
- Baz Luhrmann
- Bruce Weber
- Peter Lindbergh
- Paolo Roversi
- Karl Lagerfeld
- André Leon Talley
- Courtney Love
- Naomi Campbell
- Marina Abramović
- Daphne Guinness
- Jeff Koons
- Azzedine Alaïa

== Accolades ==
In March 2017, director Francesco Carrozzini was presented with a Nastro d'Argento (Silver Ribbon) from the Italian National Syndicate of Film Journalists.
