= Francesco Carrozzini =

Italian filmmaker and photographer (born 1982)

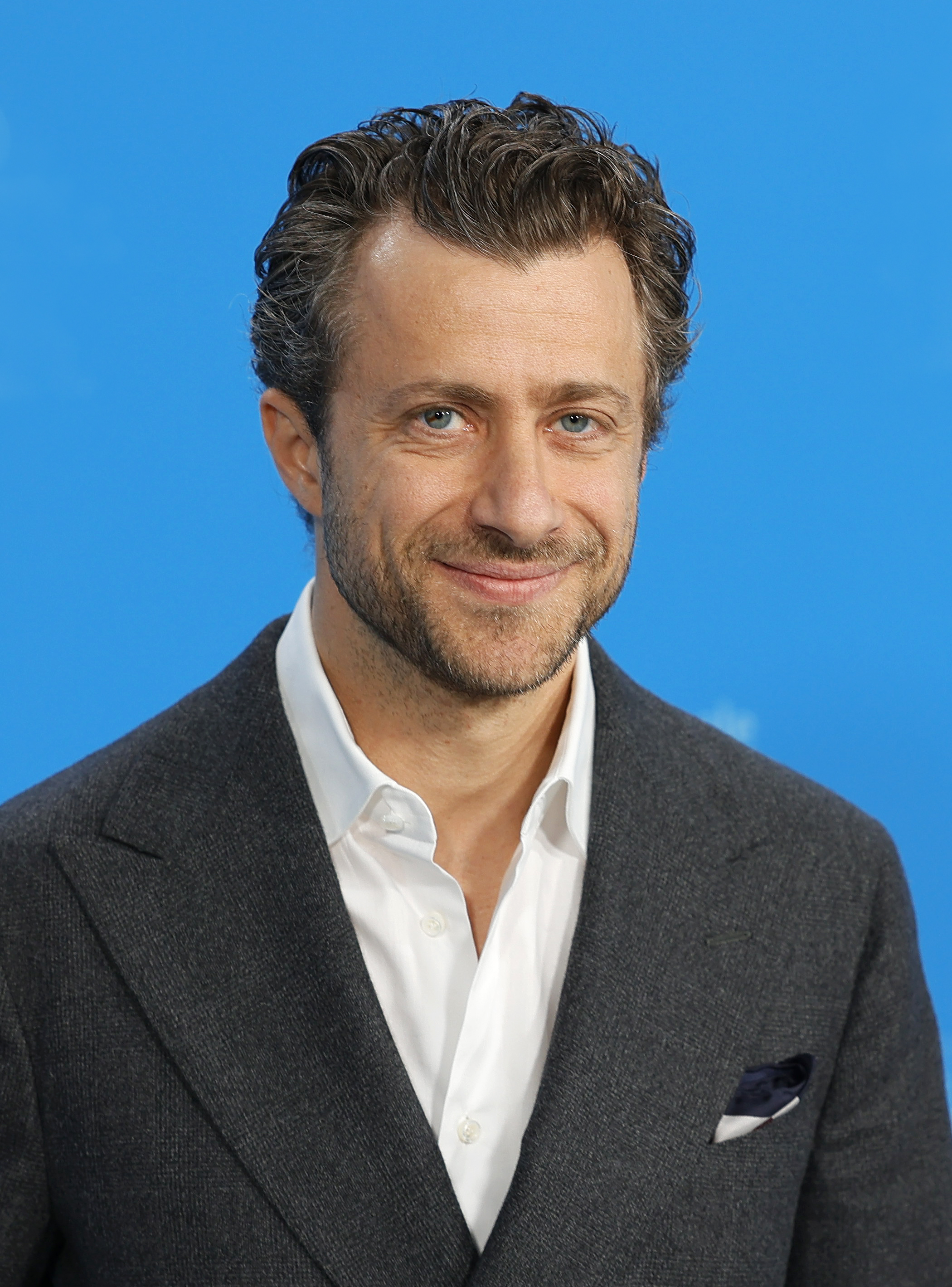
- Carrozzini in 2024
- Born: September 9, 1982 (age 44); Monza, Italy
- Education: University of California, Los Angeles; University of Milan
- Occupations: Film director; photographer
- Spouse: Bee Shaffer (m. 2018)
- Children: 1
- Parent: Franca Sozzani (mother)
- Relatives: Carla Sozzani (aunt); Anna Wintour (mother-in-law); David Shaffer (father-in-law)

Francesco Carrozzini (born September 9, 1982) is an Italian director and photographer based in the United States. In 2016, he made his feature directorial debut at the 73rd Venice International Film Festival with the documentary Franca: Chaos and Creation. In 2022, his first narrative feature, The Hanging Sun, closed the 79th Venice International Film Festival. He is known for his portrait photography and has directed music videos for artists including Jay-Z, Lana Del Rey, Beyoncé and Lenny Kravitz. He has also directed commercials for brands such as Apple and Fiat.

== Early life ==
Carrozzini was born in Monza, Italy. The son of Franca Sozzani, former editor-in-chief of Italian Vogue, he grew up in Milan. He began taking pictures and making short films with friends in his early teens. In the summer of 1999, he relocated to Los Angeles to study film at the University of California, Los Angeles.

== Career ==
=== Film ===
Carrozzini's first film job came at age 23, when he directed a commercial for the 51st Venice Biennale, commissioned by advertising agency McCann Erickson. He traveled to Poland the following year to shoot a documentary about the life and creative process of the Polish Theatre Wierszalin. Later that year, he collaborated with The New York Times on the creation of a project that became known as "The New York Times Screen Tests," a collection of intimate video interviews with entertainment figures that included Natalie Portman, Charlize Theron, and Marion Cotillard. The series received a nomination in the "New Approaches - Daytime Entertainment" category at the 37th Annual Daytime Emmy Awards.

In 2008, Carrozzini directed the short film "1937", a psychological thriller shot in Suite #822 of the infamous Chelsea Hotel, which screened in competition at the Venice Film Festival.

In the years since, he has directed commercials for clients such as Apple Music, Fiat 500 and Tommy Hilfiger. In 2009, his Ray Ban promo "Color Goes Pop" received a Young Director Award nomination at the Cannes Lions International Festival of Creativity.

In 2013, he began directing music videos and has collaborated with musicians Beyoncé, Jay-Z, Marilyn Manson and Lenny Kravitz, amongst others.

In 2016, Carrozzini debuted his first feature-length film, a documentary focusing on the life and legacy of his mother entitled Franca: Chaos and Creation. The film, which took Carrozzini roughly six years to complete, highlights the groundbreaking accomplishments of Sozzani's career in fashion publishing while also exploring the more personal relationship between a mother and her son. Franca: Chaos and Creation premiered on September 2, 2016, in the "Cinema Nel Giardino" category at the 73rd Venice International Film Festival. The film had its North American premiere as part of the Hamptons International Film Festival on October 8, 2016 and was featured at AFI Fest in Los Angeles. In March 2017, the film was honored with a Nastro d'Argento presented by the Italian National Syndicate of Film Journalists. The film was released worldwide through Netflix on October 1, 2017.

In 2021, Carrozzini directed his first narrative feature film, The Hanging Sun, an adaptation of the novel Midnight Sun (2015) by Jo Nesbø. The film stars Charles Dance, Peter Mullan, Alessandro Borghi and Jessica Brown Findlay. The Hanging Sun had its world premiere as the closing film at the 79th Venice International Film Festival on September 10, 2022.

Carrozzini also directed a few episodes of the Netflix Original Series Supersex, based on the life of iconic porn star Rocco Siffredi which premiered at the 74th Berlinale and was released in March 2024 worldwide.

=== Photography ===
Carrozzini is also known for his portrait photography; he has photographed a diverse range of contemporary pop culture icons including actors Amber Heard, Angelina Jolie, Robert De Niro, Cate Blanchett, and Scarlett Johansson; models Naomi Campbell, Heidi Klum, Linda Evangelista, Milla Jovovich, Stephanie Seymour and Tyra Banks; musicians Beyoncé, Lana Del Rey, Sting, Keith Richards, Kanye West, and Nicki Minaj, as well as artists Jeff Koons, Richard Prince, Andres Serrano, and Marina Abramović.

He has also worked with several political figures; among them, former Nigerian President Goodluck Jonathan, former Prime Minister of the United Kingdom Tony Blair, former Pakistani Prime Minister Shaukat Aziz, former United Nations Secretary General Ban Ki-moon, and former New York City mayor Michael Bloomberg.

Carrozzini's images have appeared on the covers and in the pages of: Vanity Fair, The New Yorker, New York Magazine, W, Rolling Stone, L'Uomo Vogue, Vogue Italia and Pop, among others. His advertising client list includes Apple Inc., Estee Lauder, Biotherm, Sony Music, Mini Cooper, Roberto Cavalli, Ermenegildo Zegna, Salvatore Ferragamo, DKNY, Tommy Hilfiger, Levi's, Baume & Mercier and Chopard.

== Personal life ==
Carrozzini dated singer Lana Del Rey from 2014 until 2015. In 2018, Carrozzini married Bee Shaffer, the daughter of Vogue editor-in-chief Anna Wintour and child psychiatrist David Shaffer. They have one child. The couple announced their separation in May 2026.

In 2019, Carrozzini set up the Franca Sozzani Fund for Preventive Genomics in memory of his mother, the fashion journalist Franca Sozzani, and to support research at Brigham and Women's Hospital at Harvard into preventative genomics. The initiative was funded through the sale of clothes from Sozzani's collection after her death.

== Videography ==
Year	Project
2013	A$AP Rocky: "Phoenix"
2013	Beyoncé: "Jealous"
2014	Lana Del Rey, "Ultraviolence"
2014	Lenny Kravitz, "New York City"
2014	Damian Marley, "Is It Worth It? (Gunman World)"
2014	Nicki Minaj, "The Pinkprint Movie (Part II: I Lied)"
2015	Marilyn Manson, "The Mephistopheles of Los Angeles"
2017	Jay-Z, "ManyFacedGod"
2021	Yebba, "Boomerang"

== Filmography ==
Year	Project	Notes
2008	1937	Short Film Competition, 65th International Venice Film Festival
2016	Franca: Chaos and Creation	Feature documentary, Official Selection, 73rd International Venice Film Festival
2022	The Hanging Sun	Feature Film, Official Selection, 79th International Venice Film Festival
2023	Supersex	Netflix Original Series

== Cinematography ==
Date	Project	Notes
2015	Janis: Little Girl Blue	Director: Amy J. Berg

== Exhibitions ==
- March 2004: Video installation "Pause", Duomo Cathedral, Milan
- May 2007: Solo photography exhibition, "Unique Exposure", Galleria Cardi, Milan
- May 2010: Solo photography exhibition, "Portraits", Diane Von Furstenberg Gallery, New York
- January 2012: L'Uomo Vogue cover shots included in Sotheby's charity auction celebrating the magazine, Paris
- May 2015: Solo photography exhibition, "Portraits", Istanbul'74 Arts Festival, Istanbul
- September 2015: Solo photography and film exhibition, "Music", Earth Gallery, Paris

== Awards and recognition ==
- In 2017 Carrozzini's movie Franca: Chaos and Creation was awarded the Nastro D'Argento (Silver Ribbon) by the Italian film press.
- In February 2016 Carrozzini and his team received an award from Global Green acknowledging the achievements for work done with Connect4Climate, part of the sustainable branch of the World Bank.
- In September 2013, Carrozzini was included on Vanity Fair's International Best Dressed List.

== Venice Film Festival Jury ==
- In 2019, Carrozzini was a juror for the Venice Virtual Reality section at the 76th Venice Film Festival alongside Laurie Anderson and Alysha Naples.
