= Anna Dello Russo =

Italian fashion journalist (born 1962)

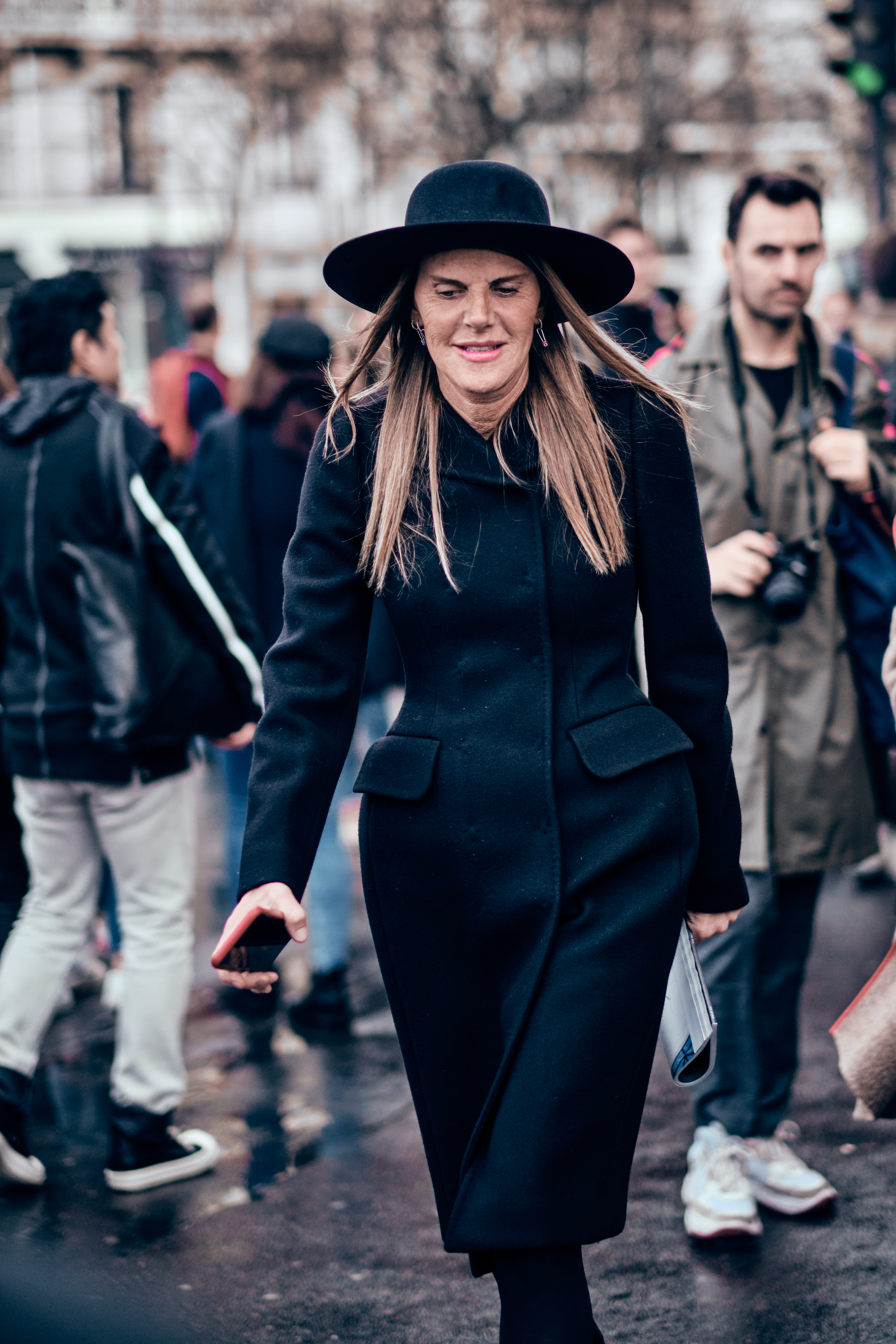
- Dello Russo in 2019
- Born: 1962 (age 63–64); Bari, Italy
- Occupations: Magazine editor and fashion journalist
- Title: Editor-at-Large, Nippon Vogue
- Website: annadellorusso.com

Anna Dello Russo (born 1962) is an Italian fashion journalist. She is a creative consultant and editor-at-large for Vogue Japan.

== Early life ==
Dello Russo was born in Bari in Southern Italy. She has a brother and a sister. Her father, a psychiatrist, and her mother, a naturalist, were supportive of her fashion career.

Dello Russo was interested in fashion from a young age and remembers asking her father for "one set of Fendi" when she was 12 years old. The set, which included a handbag, scarf, umbrella, tissue holder, wallet and keychain, triggered her obsession of collecting fashion. Dello Russo has been an avid collector of fashion and jewelry since then. She owns two apartments next door to each other; one is her home and the other is her closet. As of 2010, Dello Russo had over 4,000 pairs of shoes. In 1996, Dello Russo was married for a little over a month before getting a divorce. She claims she and her husband separated over her not leaving any space in their closets for his items.

Dello Russo studied Italian Literature and Art History at the University of Bari before receiving her master's degree in Fashion from Domus Academy in Milan. Dello Russo was then hired by Condé Nast for Vogue Italia, where she worked closely under Franca Sozzani for 18 years.

In 2006, she left her position as creative director of L'Uomo Vogue to work as a freelance creative consultant. In 2007, Dello Russo returned to Condé Nast as editor-at-large for Vogue Japan. She started her own fashion blog in 2010.

== Career ==
Anna Dello Russo has been the subject of many magazine editorials for magazines such as 10 and Interview. She was the fashion editor for Vogue Italia for 12 years and then spent six years as editor-in-chief of L'Uomo Vogue. Dello Russo has appeared in TV shows, has authored a book, released her own fragrance and accessory line and has collaborated with H&M. Her book, AdR: Beyond Fashion, was published by Phaidon in 2018. She has built a large following on both Instagram and Twitter and has made a name for herself in the fashion industry. Dello Russo is known around the world for her flamboyant, colorful and ever-changing style, which she has turned into a unique and successful career in street style. Evolved from British fashion, street style is a type of style that is based on both individualism and current fashion trends. Stylists in the fashion industry often use street style as a way to stand out from or put a twist on the current trends.

In 2018, Dello Russo began auctioning off her clothes as a way to deal with the grief after the passing of Italian journalist and editor-in-chief of Vogue Italia, Franca Sozzani. Dello Russo has donated all of the money she made from selling her clothes to the British Fashion Council Education Foundation. She also auctioned off some of her clothing to give the proceeds to the Swarovski Foundation. Dello Russo is also taking steps to slowly get rid of her internet alter ego and is gradually removing herself from social media. She believes the internet is important and was an early adopter when it first emerged. However, since the passing of her mentors, she has since prioritized herself ahead of her career and will always have the memories from early in her career.

Anna Dello Russo works as an Italian fashion journalist. Currently Dello Russo is a fashion editor-at-large for Vogue in Japan. Along with her current position at Vogue in Japan, Dello Russo started her own fashion blog and website in 2010. Prior to the job at Vogue, Dello Russo was a fashion editor at Vogue magazine in Milan Italy from 2000–2006. Dello Russo started working in the editorial department of Donna magazine.

Throughout her career, Anna Dello Russo had many mentors, including Franca Sozzani and Manuela Pavesi. She credits the various mentors she had throughout her career with who she is professionally today. When working under Franca Sozzani, Dello Russo said her example and advice allowed no room for mistakes or lowering the bar.

Dello Russo became the international brand ambassador and scientific director of the Istituto Marangoni's Milan campus in 2018. Since starting there, she has launched "Playground". The year-long course allows students to work together on various fashion projects and then present those projects in front of a panel of real designers. The panel includes Marco de Vincenzo, Alessandro Dell'Acqua, Andrea Incontri and Giuliano Calza.

In 2023, Dello Russo launched a capsule collection with premium denim company 7 For All Mankind.

== Recognition ==
Forbes has described Anna dello Russo as "A force to be reckoned with", as well as, "One of the most photographed women in fashion." Anna dello Russo is a well-recognized icon in the fashion industry.

In 2010, Dello Russo partnered with YOOX T-shirts and printed shirts with 10 different images of her. The shirts were completely sold out on the first day of sale.

In 2012, Dello Russo released a new collection of accessories and collaborated with H&M. To celebrate her new collection, she partnered with Vimeo and released the song "Fashion Shower". Her lyrics include "I am the guardian of fashion" and "You need a fashion shower."

In 2013, Dello Russo designed accessories for the Swedish H&M chain. After the death of Sozzani in 2016, Russo marked a turning point in her life by auctioning off her clothes to raise money for charity. Shortly after she released her book Beyond Fashion. Vogue described the book as "A cabinet of curiosities that captures the essence of Anna dello Russo."

In February 2018, she decided to take a stand against fur and donated all her furs to PETA rather than keep them in a Christie's auction during Milan Fashion Week. After her contributions to PETA, she donated several of her clothes to be auctioned off for charity. Her contribution raised €147,000 for the Swarovski Foundation's scholarship program.
