= Hervé Léger =

French fashion house

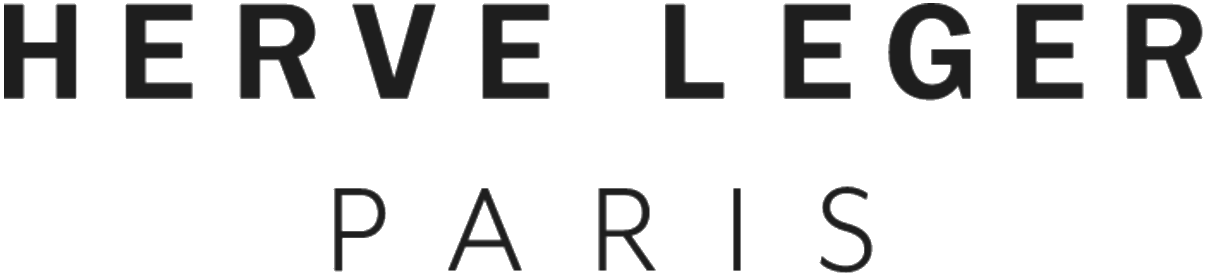
- Type: Subsidiary
- Industry: Fashion
- Founded: 1985; 41 years ago
- Founder: Hervé Peugnet
- Headquarters: France
- Products: Fashion designs
- Parent: Authentic Luxury Group
- Website: herveleger.com

Hervé Léger (French pronunciation: [ɛʁve leʒe]) is a French fashion house that was founded by the designer Hervé Peugnet, who was also known as Hervé L. Leroux. As of 2023, the creative director is American designer Michelle Ochs.

== History ==
Hervé Léger was founded in 1985 by the designer Hervé Peugnet (1957–2017). That same year, Karl Lagerfeld advised Peugnet that his surname would be too difficult for Americans (the target market) to pronounce, and he suggested the surname Léger instead. Having lost the rights to the Hervé Léger name, Peugnet later took a third "brand" name as Hervé L. Leroux in 2000.

As early as 1982, however, the fashion press was already referring to Peugnet as Hervé Léger, as that was the year he gained international attention for leading a design team at Chanel that revamped the Chanel silhouette, a year before Karl Lagerfeld took over the house. Peugnet had previously worked as an assistant to Lagerfeld and was likely influenced by Lagerfeld in his 1982 reworking of the Chanel look, a reworking that bore hallmarks of the body-conscious trend of the time, a trend followed by a number of eighties designers beginning in the late seventies, including Lagerfeld, Peugnet, Thierry Mugler, and (most famously) Azzedine Alaïa, to whom Peugnet's work would frequently be compared in the future. Peugnet altered the Chanel silhouette by broadening the shoulder, shortening the jacket, shortening and tightening the skirt, raising the heel height, and increasing the scale of the jewelry and purses, all controversial moves initially.

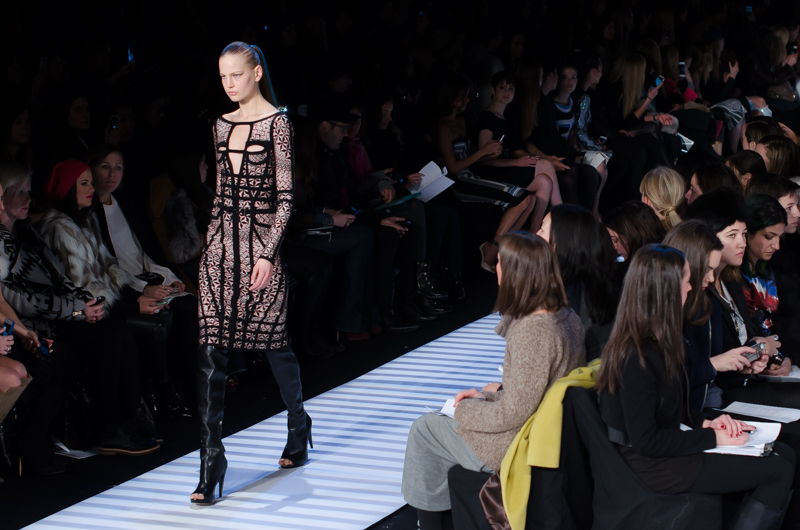
A model walking the runway at Hervé Leger Fall/Winter 2014 show at New York Fashion Week, February 2014

Along with Azzedine Alaïa, who had introduced the style by 1985, Peugnet pioneered the creation of so-called bandage dresses, so-called "body-con" (body-conscious) garments made using materials traditionally associated with foundation garments to create bandage dresses that would mold and shape the wearer's figure with its signature bandage-like strips.

One of the peculiarities of Hervé Léger garments is that they are knitted, not woven.

In September 1998, Hervé Léger was acquired by the BCBG Max Azria Group from the Seagram's Group. This was the first-ever acquisition of a French couturier by an American designer, though Azria is Tunisian and grew up in France. Ohana & Co., a boutique investment bank, advised Seagram's on the sale.

In April 2007, Max Azria relaunched the Hervé Léger brand under his own design direction with a capsule summer collection, which was offered at select department stores and specialty boutiques. In August 2007, the remodeled Hervé Léger boutique opened on Rodeo Drive in Beverly Hills. In February 2008, Max Azria presented the Hervé Léger by Max Azria collection at Bryant Park during the Fall 2008 New York Fashion Week.

In August 2017, Marquee Brands acquired the entire brand portfolio of BGBG Max Azria Global Holdings, including Hervé Léger, following the bankruptcy of BCBG Max Azria. In October 2017, Marquee Brands sold Hervé Léger to Authentic Brands Group.

Dutch designer Christian Juul Nielsen, who previously worked at Christian Dior Couture and Nina Ricci, was appointed creative director in August 2018. His focus was on modernizing and expanding the brand image beyond the bandage dress into daywear and lifestyle categories.

In 2023 the brand appointed Michelle Ochs, cofounder of Cushnie et Ochs, as the creative director.
