= Francesca Ragazzi =

Italian journalist (born 1988)

Francesca Ragazzi (born 1988), is an Italian journalist and fashion editor, who is currently the head of editorial content at Vogue Italia.

== Early life ==
Ragazzi was born in Bologna in 1988. Her mother Paola Villa is a former model and her father Maurizio Ragazzi was a basketball player. She studied modern literature at the Sorbonne Nouvelle.

== Career ==
In 2021, Ragazzi was named Head of Editorial Content at Vogue Italia, replacing Emanuele Farneti.

=== Timeline ===
Timeline of her career:

- Fashion Coordinator & Correspondent at Vogue Italia (Paris office), 2011–2014
- Associate Market Editor at Vogue, 2014–2018
- Fashion Market Director at Vogue Italia, 2018–2021
- Fashion Market Director at L'Uomo Vogue, 2018–2021
- Head of Editorial Content at Vogue Italia, 2021–present

== Personal life ==
On 12 September 2020, she wed Francesco Zucchini in Bologna.

Media offices
Preceded by Emanuele Farneti	Head of Editorial Content at Vogue Italia; 2021–present	Succeeded by current
