= Michelle Ochs =

American fashion designer

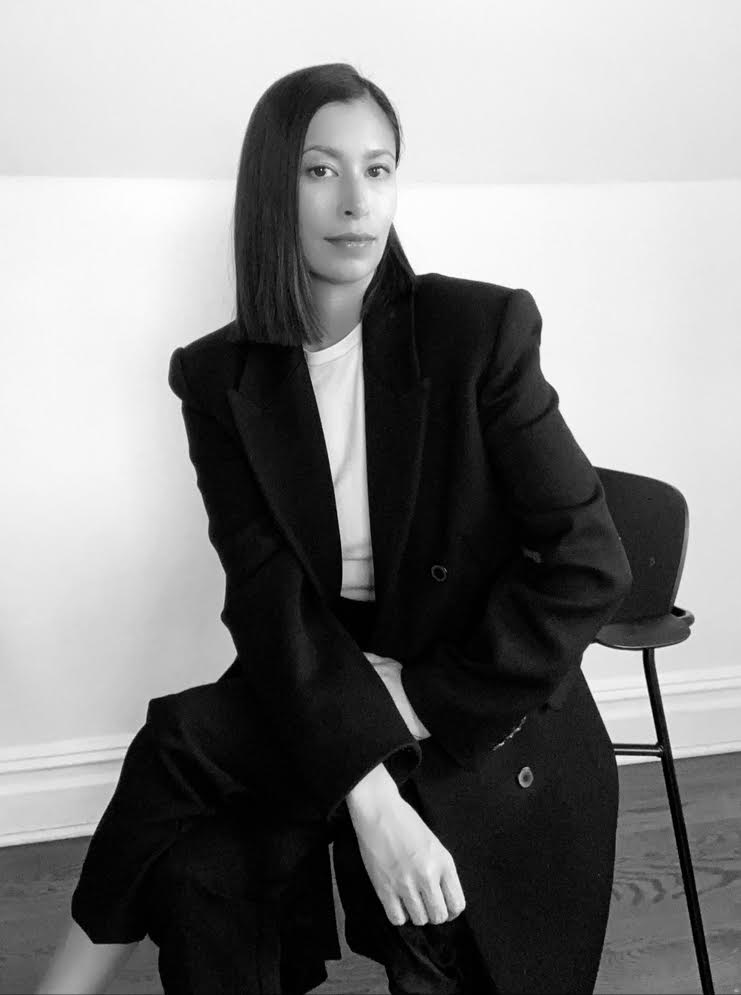
- Ochs's Portrait
- Born: Calgary, Alberta, Canada
- Education: Parsons School of Design
- Occupation: Fashion designer
- Years active: 2005–present
- Title: Creative director of Hervé Léger Founder of Cushnie et Ochs; Founder of Et Ochs
- Awards: Ecco Domani Award

Michelle Ochs is an American fashion designer and Creative Director. She rose to prominence as co-founder of Cushnie et Ochs, founder of Et Ochs in 2021 and since 2023 is the Creative Director of Hervé Léger. Since then, Ochs has made an impact on the fashion scene with her signature sleek aesthetic and daring silhouettes.

She is the winner of the 2009 Ecco Domani Award, a finalist for the 2011 CFDA/Vogue Fashion Fund, a nominee for the 2012 CFDA Swarovski Award for Womenswear and 2010 Fashion Group International Rising Star Award, and Forbes 30 under 30. and received multiple nominations for the Cooper Hewitt National Design Award.

She has been an active member of the Council of Fashion Designers of America (CFDA) since 2012.

She is also the Founder and Creative Director of ET OCHS, which was launched in 2021.

== Early life and education ==
She was born in Calgary, Alberta and raised in Gaithersburg, Maryland, and completed a military high school education in Washington, DC. Her early interest in fashion and design led her to pursue formal education in the field. She is of mixed German and Filipino heritage.

Ochs attended Parsons School of Design in New York City, where she earned a Bachelor of Arts degree in Fashion Design. She received the Designer of the Year award in 2007.

During her time at Parsons, she worked as a design intern for Marc Jacobs before moving on to Isaac Mizrahi's Made to Order. She also interned at Chado Ralph Rucci's workshop, where she learned firsthand about the couture processes.

== Career ==
Ochs, along with her business partner, established their fashion brand Cushnie et Ochs in 2008 following their graduation from Parsons New School for Design. The brand's debut collection for Spring 2009 was exclusively retailed at Bergdorf Goodman in New York.

In 2018, she announced her departure from Cushnie et Ochs. As Creative Director, Ochs played a role in shaping the brand's aesthetic and vision. Her designs were celebrated for their sophistication, and attention to detail. During her tenure, the line became synonymous with modern femininity, attracting fashion enthusiasts and celebrities alike.

In 2012, at just 27 years old, Ochs experienced a pivotal moment when a stylist from Michelle Obama's office reached out to their brand to design a dress for the First Lady.

Her designs have become red carpet staples, she designed for Karlie Kloss, Beyoncé, Rosie Huntington-Whitely, Michelle Obama, Reese Witherspoon, and Diane Kruger. She has also designed for Zoe Saldana, Margot Robbie and Kate Hudson.

In 2021, Ochs relaunched her eponymous label, ET OCHS. She partnered with JS Group, a Canadian family-run business which owns and operates several womenswear brands. Ochs debuted her first Spring 2022 collection as a part of New York Fashion Week.

In 2023, she was appointed as the Creative Director of Hervé Léger in a bid to revitalize the brand. Her debut Spring 2024 collection for the brand focused on adding dimension, movement, and fluidity to the brand's signature bandage dresses, expanding into streamlined separates like pants, jumpsuits, and tops. Ochs has infused modern touches into classic designs, and takes inspiration from Hervé Léger's extensive archives. Since taking the reins, she has breathed new life the label known for its signature bandage dress and expanding its offerings beyond the signature bandage silhouette.

== Style and inspiration ==
Ochs's style is characterized by sleek lines and silhouettes. Throughout her career she has demonstrated a mastery of tailoring techniques and a command of stretch fabrics.

She has a talent for incorporating innovative elements into her collections. "Vogue has described Ochs' clothing as combining sensuousness, intelligence, and sophistication, with designs that simplify the process of dressing while maintaining a sense of uniqueness."

== Awards and recognition ==
- PARSONS Designer of the Year 2007.
- Winner of the 2009 Ecco Domani Award.
- Finalist for the 2011 CFDA/Vogue Fashion Fund.
- Nominee for the 2012 CFDA Swarovski Award for Womenswear.
- Nominee for the 2010 Fashion Group International Rising Star Award.
- Named in Forbes 30 under 30.
