= Azzedine Alaïa =

Tunisian fashion designer (1935–2017)

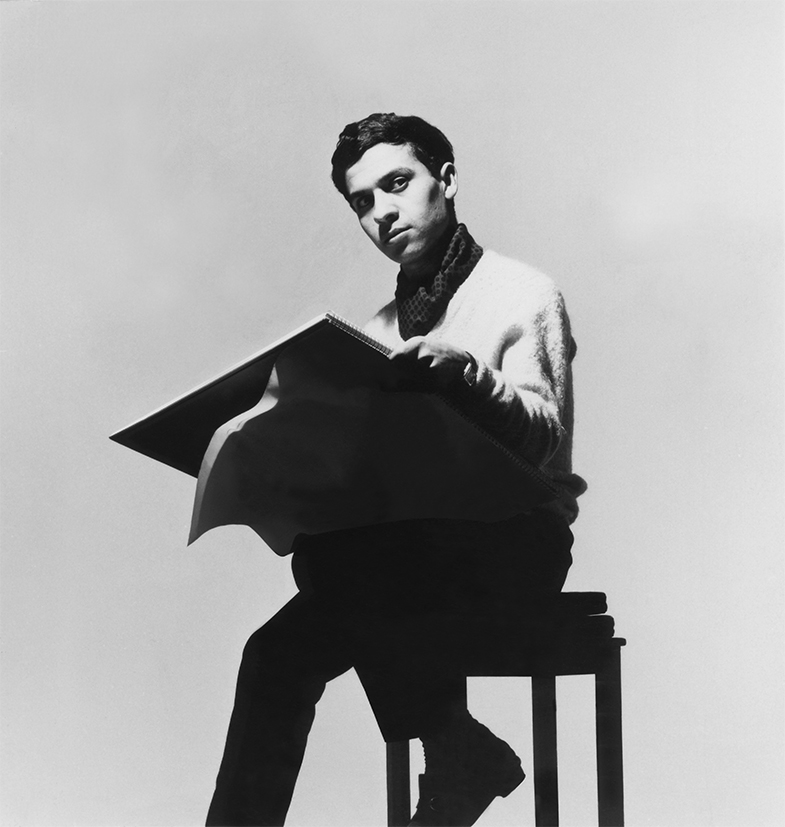
- Azzedine Alaïa as a young art student at the Tunis Institute of Fine Arts
- Born: 26 February 1935; Tunis, French Tunisia
- Died: 18 November 2017 (aged 82); Paris, France
- Resting place: Sidi Bou Said, Tunisia
- Education: Tunis Institute of Fine Arts
- Label: Alaïa
- Awards: Best Designer of the Year (1984); Legion of Honour – Knight (2008)

Azzedine Alaïa (French: [azedin alaja]; Arabic: عز الدين عليّة, romanized: ʿIzz ad-Dīn ʿAlayya, pronounced [ʕizz adˈdiːn ʕaˈlajja]; 26 February 1935 – 18 November 2017) was a Tunisian-French couturier and shoe designer. He became globally known for his women's dresses, and he dressed numerous celebrities throughout his career.

== Early life and education ==
Alaïa was born in Tunis, on 26 February 1935. His parents were wheat farmers, but his twin sister, Hafida, inspired his love for couture. A French friend of his mother, Mrs. Pineau, fed Alaïa's instinctive creativity with copies of Vogue. When he was 15 years old he lied about his age to get into the Tunis Institute of Fine Arts, a local school of fine arts in Tunis, where he gained valuable insights into the human form and began studying sculpture. He worked as an assistant to Madame Richard, a Tunisian seamstress, and with this he paid for his sister's school tuition fees.

== Career ==
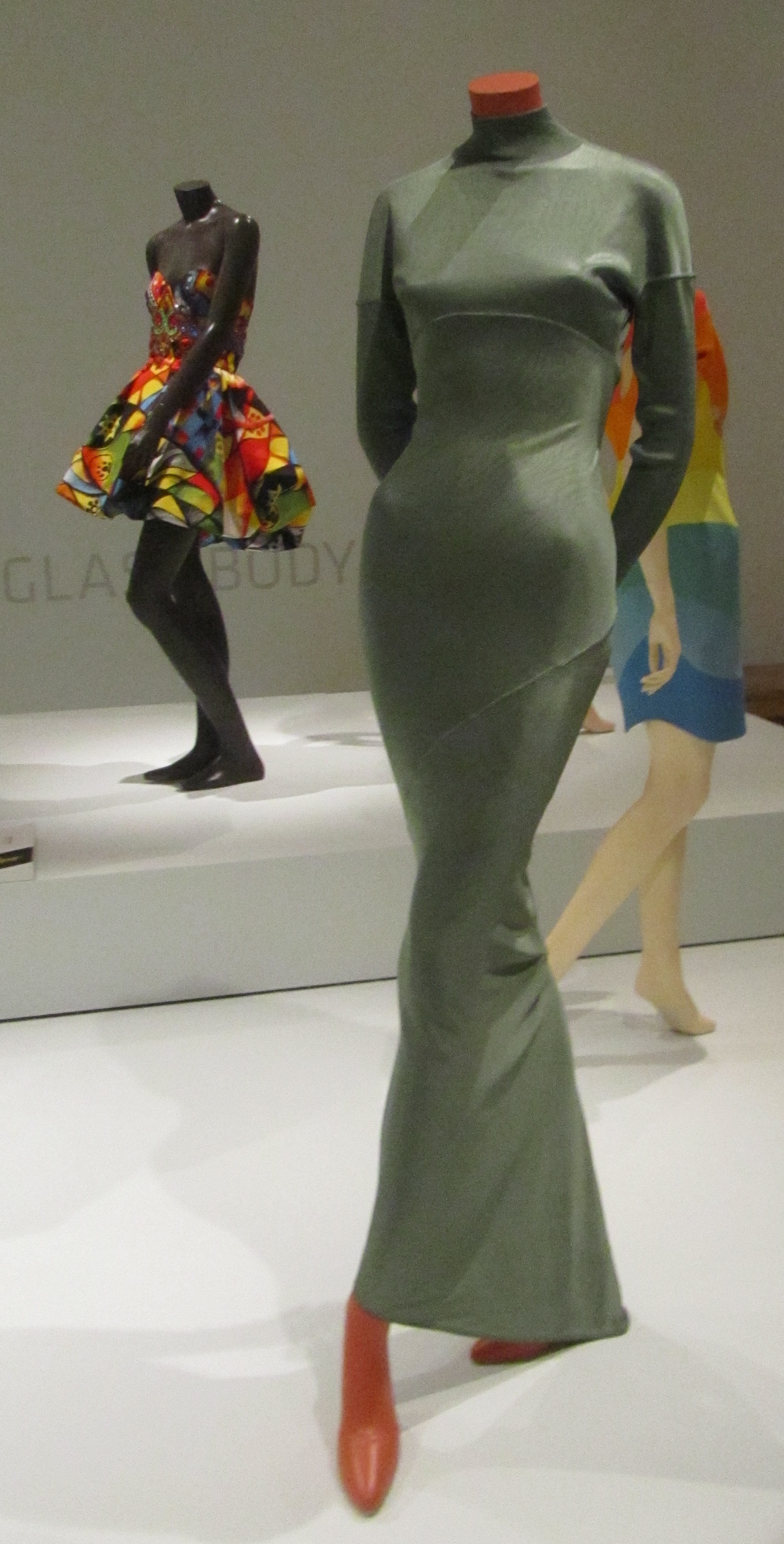
A grey Azzedine Alaïa dress (front), from 1986 to 1987, acetate

In June 1956, Alaïa went to Paris and met his earliest supporters. Simone Zehrfuss, a society figure and wife of architect Bernard Zehrfuss introduced him to prominent cultural circles, including writer Louise de Vilmorin, and helped him build an early private clientele that later included Arletty and Greta Garbo. He then began an internship at the Christian Dior workshops. However, he was fired after four days. In 1958, he began working for Guy Laroche for three seasons. Afterwards, he continued making clothes for high-society Tunisians and others. In 1965, he created the prototype for the Mondrian dresses in Yves Saint Laurent's Mondrian collection.

Alaïa opened his first atelier in his small rue de Bellechasse apartment in 1979. It was in this tiny atelier that for almost 20 years he privately dressed members of the world's jet set, from Marie-Hélène de Rothschild to Louise de Vilmorin (who would become a close friend) to Greta Garbo, who used to come incognito for her fittings. He took apart old garments designed by Madeleine Vionnet and Cristóbal Balenciaga to study how they were made up, and then, he put them back together. He maintained a friendship with former employer Thierry Mugler and also befriended Claude Montana. All would influence each other and would often be mentioned in the same breath during the 1980s.

Alaïa produced his first ready-to-wear collection in 1980 and moved to larger premises on rue du Parc-Royal in the Marais district. His career skyrocketed when two of the most powerful fashion editors of the time, Melka Tréanton of Dépèche Mode and Nicole Crassat of French Elle, supported him in their editorials following that collection, with both fashion writers and the public particularly embracing a pair of his grommeted black leather gauntlet gloves, gloves being a particular love of the designer.

Later in 1980, while interior designer Andrée Putman was walking down Madison Avenue with one of the first Alaïa leather coats, she was stopped by a Bergdorf Goodman buyer who asked her what she was wearing. This encounter began a turn of events that led to Alaïa's designs being sold in New York City and in Beverly Hills. When his clothes finally arrived in New York, first at Bergdorf Goodman in 1982, it was considered so momentous that The New York Times later listed it as among the landmark events that altered the cultural landscape of the city. Three years later, 10,000 fans vied for 1,500 tickets to his first US showing in the city at the recently opened Palladium, for whom Alaïa had provided the wait staff's uniforms.

Unlike some designers of the period, including his close friend Thierry Mugler, Alaïa generally avoided large venues and spectacle in his presentations, instead favoring traditional salon showings with limited attendance and a small number of garments. He presented on his own schedule rather than following the fashion-week model used by many designers twice a year. Following periods of high sales and the resulting workload, he sometimes did not present a collection the next season.

Alaïa's designs were known for their very tight fit, deft tailoring, curve-accenting seaming, leather work, and inventive use of knits. The colors he favored tended to the somber, mostly neutrals and earthtones, his masterful cut and blatant body promotion carrying the impact. In his early years on his own, he favored the broad shoulders that were part of the revival of 1940s styles begun on an industry-wide scale in 1978 and famously exaggerated by his friends Thierry Mugler and Claude Montana. His body emphasis outdid that of his colleagues, though, becoming his signature. Though he mostly relied on fit, cut, and seaming to reveal the body, by the early nineties he was incorporating corselets and bust wiring.

Alaïa was very influential during the 1980s, with many designers copying his voluptuous silhouette, particularly his brilliantly executed undulating peplums of 1985, an almost direct lift from styles shown in 1935 by Alix, who had in turn been interpreting traditional Balinese ceremonial dress. Another of his mid-1980s contributions, the bandage dress, was adopted in the 1990s with great success by designer Hervé Léger as that designer's own signature style.

By 1988, Alaïa had opened his own boutiques in New York City and Beverly Hills and in Paris. His seductive, clinging clothes were a massive success and he was named by the media 'The King of Cling'. Devotees included both fashion-inclined celebrities and fashionistas: Grace Jones (wearing several of his creations in A View to a Kill), Tina Turner, Raquel Welch, Madonna, Iman, Janet Jackson, Brigitte Nielsen, Naomi Campbell, Stephanie Seymour, Tatiana Sorokko, Shakira, Franca Sozzani, Isabelle Aubin, Carine Roitfeld, and Carla Sozzani. Among his muses was venerated French actress and private client Arletty, photos of whom figured prominently at Alaīa's headquarters.

While Alaïa's style and craftsmanship were praised by many, he did not escape criticism. He was part of a cohort of designers who began in 1978 to revive the revealing, man-focused styles of the 1940s and 1950s, after a period during the late 1960s and '70s when women's clothes had become less constricting, less focused on flirtatious coquetry, more natural, comfortable, and practical. Some saw the tight skirts, molded busts, cinched waists, and ultra-high heels of Mugler, Montana, Alaïa, and a number of others as regressive, a mockery of women's recently won liberation from male dictates. Others saw Alaïa's clothes in particular as wearable only by those with perfect bodies, and even then not necessarily the most flattering. Alaïa and his supporters of course differed, the designer himself stating that even full-figured women looked good in his clothes and others noting that fitted clothes had renewed appeal after a decade when loose, flowing clothes had been the norm.

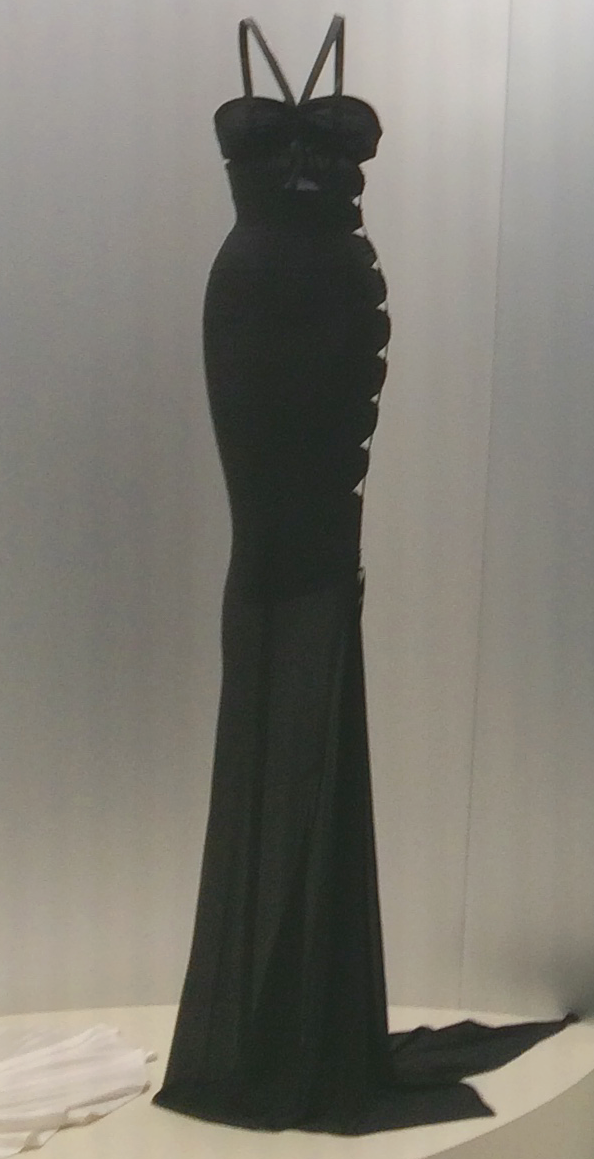
Black dress by Azzedine Alaïa

In 1991, Alaïa collaborated with the French budget retail chain Tati (company), creating a mini-collection using the brand's signature pink-and-white vichy check print. The collaboration, which included bags, espadrilles and T-shirts for Tati as well as couture pieces incorporating the same motif, is widely recognized as one of the earliest examples of a high fashion–mass market partnership. It was not conceived for publicity but rather as an homage to the accessibility of fashion and remains a culturally significant moment in his career.

During the mid-1990s, following the death of his sister, Alaïa virtually vanished from the fashion scene; however, he continued to cater to a private clientele and enjoyed commercial success with his ready-to-wear lines. He presented his collections in his own space, in the heart of the Marais, where he brought his creative workshop, boutique and showroom together under one roof.

In 1996, Alaïa participated at the Biennale della Moda in Florence, where along with paintings by longtime friend Julian Schnabel, he exhibited an outstanding dress created for the event. Schnabel-designed furniture, as well as his large-scale canvases, still decorate Alaïa's boutique in Paris.

Alaïa then signed a partnership with the Prada group in 2000. In 2002, a number of Yves Saint Laurent’s former couture staff joined Alaïa after Saint Laurent’s retirement, including the heads of the tailoring and dressmaking ateliers. Working with Prada saw him through a second impressive renaissance, and in July 2007, he successfully bought back his house and brand name from the Prada group, though his footwear and leather goods division continues to be developed and produced by the group.

In 2007, the Richemont group, which owns Cartier and Van Cleef & Arpels, took a stake in Alaïa. In 2015, the brand launched its first perfume, Alaïa Paris, in collaboration with Beauté Prestige International.

However, Alaïa still refused the marketing-driven logic of luxury conglomerates, continuing to focus on clothes rather than "it-bags". Alaïa is revered for his independence and passion for discreet luxury. Catherine Lardeur, the former editor-in-chief of French Marie Claire in the 1980s, who also helped to launch Jean-Paul Gaultier's career, stated in an interview to Crowd Magazine that "Fashion is dead. Designers nowadays do not create anything, they only make clothes so people and the press would talk about them. The real money for designers lie within perfumes and handbags. It is all about image. Alaïa remains the king. He is smart enough to not only care about having people talk about him. He only holds fashion shows when he has something to show, on his own time frame. Even when Prada owned him he remained free and did what he wanted to do."

Throughout his life, Alaïa worked in collaboration with various artists and creators, among them the German photographer Peter Lindbergh with whom he formed a surprising pair: Alaïa was tiny and Lindbergh was huge. The two shared a close friendship with Vogue Italia director Franca Sozzani. About this Alaïa said:

"I have always wanted women to be free. I hope my dresses give them that lightness. The greatest compliment is when they look at themselves and say to me: 'I feel free".

== Costume design ==
In 2013, Alaïa designed costumes for Christopher Alden's production of the opera “The Marriage of Figaro” with Christopher Maltman and Dorothea Röschmann at the Walt Disney Concert Hall in Los Angeles, marking the first time he designed men's clothes.

== Azzedine Alaïa Association ==
Alaïa and his partner, German painter Christoph von Weyhe, created the Azzedine Alaïa Association in 2007, a nonprofit administered by von Weyhe, Carla Sozzani and Olivier Saillard. Its purpose is to preserve Alaïa's expansive collections of fashion history, art and design as well as his personal archive.

== Personal life ==
Alaïa resided at 18 rue de la Verrerie in Paris. He purchased the property in 1987. While the property initially consisted of industrial buildings, Alaïa turned those buildings into a 4,000-square-meter complex that included "an interconnected array of spaces" and became his home and workplace. A documentary about the property was released in 2021.

Alaïa's longtime partner was artist Christoph von Weyhe.

Alaïa was 5'3" tall.

== Death ==
On 18 November 2017, it was announced that Alaïa had died in Paris at the age of 82 following an accidental fall down the stairs. His remains were flown to Tunisia two days later. Alaïa received an Islamic funeral and was buried in the town of Sidi Bou Said.

British Vogue editor, Edward Enninful, stated that "Azzedine Alaïa was a true visionary, and a remarkable man. He will be deeply missed by all of those who knew and loved him, as well as by the women around the world who wore his clothes." He was considered a father figure to Naomi Campbell since she was 16 years old. She was among the crowd who attended Alaïa's funeral.

== Recognition ==
=== Awards ===
Alaïa was voted Best Designer of the Year and Best Collection of the Year at the Oscars de la Mode by the French Ministry of Culture in 1984 in a memorable event where Jamaican singer Grace Jones carried him in her arms on stage.

Alaïa was named a Knight in France's Legion of Honour by the French government in 2008. He notedly refused the honour, saying, "I refused because I don't like decorations — except on women." He turned down many other similar awards, stating that the best honour was the citizenship that France had given him.

=== Exhibitions ===
The first formal exhibition dedicated to Alaïa occurred in early 1985, when the CAPC Musée d'art contemporain de Bordeaux presented a retrospective of his 1980-85 work. Alaïa was honored with a solo exhibition at the Groninger Museum in the Netherlands in 1998, which debuted at the Guggenheim Museum in New York in 2000, curated by Mark Wilson and Jim Cook. In 2018, a dedicated retrospective exhibition in celebration of Alaïa took place at the Design Museum in London.

=== In popular culture ===
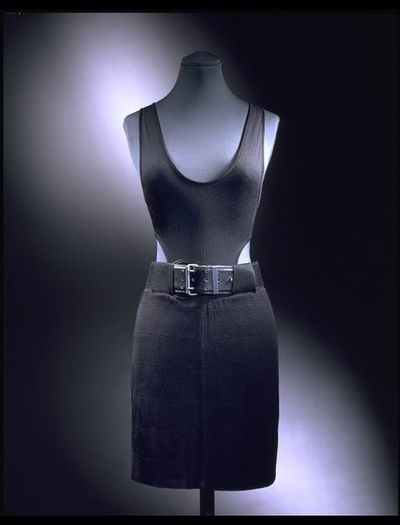
Mini-skirt dress of black acetate jersey, designed by Azzedine Alaïa, Paris, 1985

Alaïa was referenced in the mid-'90s teen hit Clueless starring Alicia Silverstone. Silverstone's character, mugged at gunpoint in the film, protests kneeling in a parking lot in a famously clingy dress by the "totally important designer" by exclaiming, "This is an Alaïa!"

Marion Cotillard wore an Alaïa gown in a photoshoot for the French issue of Elle magazine in May 2005. In June 2009, she wore an Alaïa black dress for a photoshoot for the French magazine Madame Figaro. In March 2010, she wore a black Alaïa dress in a photoshoot for Jalouse magazine. On 27 November 2012, she wore an Alaïa black and white pleated dress while attending a luncheon for her film Rust and Bone at Brasserie Ruhlmann in New York City. Cotillard also attended a screen talk at the BFI Southbank wearing the same dress.

Michelle Obama is a regular Alaïa client. The First Lady wore a formal black knit sleeveless dress with a ruffled skirt designed by Alaïa to the NATO dinner with heads of state in Strasbourg, France, on 3 April 2009. Also in 2009, Michelle Obama wore an Alaïa dress to the American Ballet Theatre's opening-night Spring Gala in New York. Her choice of fashion by the Tunisian couturier broke with the tradition of American First Ladies who had worn only the clothes of American designers to such events.

The former First Lady of France, Carla Bruni, also wore an Alaïa jacket during the state visit to Spain in 2009.

Madonna also honored him in her 1993 "Bad Girl" video. She rips the plastic off her dry cleaned suit, the tag of which reads "Alaïa."

Lady Gaga has also worn several of his creations, notably in her Thanksgiving special, when she wore a long fall 2011 dress.

Rihanna has worn his creations as well, notably at the 2013 Grammys.

His creations have also been worn by Beyoncé, Nicki Minaj, Victoria Beckham, Kim Kardashian, Gwyneth Paltrow, Solange Knowles, Behati Prinsloo and more.

During an interview with The Ground Social & Magazine (formerly known as Virgine), Alaïa criticised both Anna Wintour and Karl Lagerfeld. Alaïa, then 71 and based in Paris, said of Chanel creative director Lagerfeld, "I don't like his fashion, his spirit, his attitude. It's too much caricature. Karl Lagerfeld never touched a pair of scissors in his life." Alaïa also lashed out at the Vogue editor-in-chief: "She runs the business very well, but not the fashion part. When I see how she is dressed, I don't believe in her tastes one second... Anyway, who will remember Anna Wintour in the history of fashion? No one."

In 2018, Alaia was mentioned by Mariah Carey in her song "A No No" from the album Caution: "Got a pink gown custom by Alaia".

The movie director Julian Schnabel dedicated his movie At Eternity's Gate to Alaïa.

== See also ==
- Legion of Honour
- Legion of Honour Museum
- List of Legion of Honour recipients by name (A)
- Ribbons of the French military and civil awards
