= Carla Sozzani =

Italian entrepreneur (born 1947)

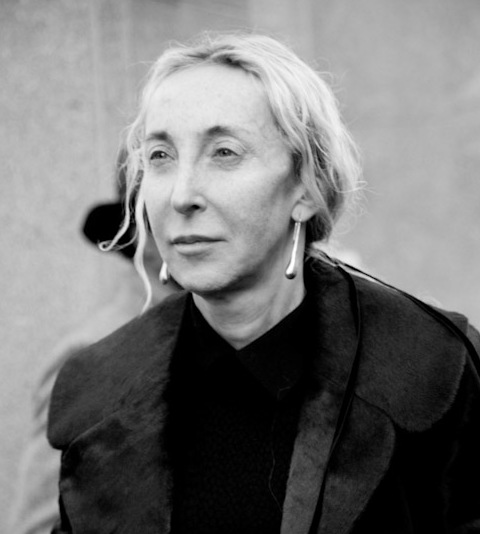
- Born: June 29, 1947; Mantua, Italy
- Education: Bocconi University
- Occupations: Gallerist, businesswoman, editor
- Known for: Founder of Galleria Carla Sozzani, Creator of 10 Corso Como
- Partner(s): Kris Ruhs (partner, artist)
- Relatives: Franca Sozzani (sister); Francesco Carrozzini (nephew)

Carla Sozzani (born 29 June 1947) is an Italian book and magazine editor, gallerist, and businesswoman. She founded the Galleria Carla Sozzani in 1989 and is the creator of 10 Corso Como, an art and fashion establishment in Milan.

== Early life and education ==
Sozzani was born in Mantua in 1947. Her younger sister Franca Sozzani (1950–2016) was the editor-in-chief of Vogue Italia from 1988 to 2016.

She obtained a degree in economics from Bocconi University in Milan.

== Career ==
While attending university in the late 1960s and early 1970s, Sozzani began working as an editor for several Italian fashion magazines.

In the following decade, Sozzani served as editor-in-chief for all of Italian Vogue's special issues, collaborating with photographers and artists such as Sarah Moon, Herb Ritts, Bruce Weber, Paolo Roversi, Robert Mapplethorpe, William Wegman, and Deborah Turbeville.

In 1986, Sozzani left Italian Vogue and was appointed by Alexander Liberman as editor-at-large for American Vogue in Italy.

In 1987, Sozzani launched and edited the Italian edition of Elle. In 1989, she met American artist Kris Ruhs, beginning both a professional and personal relationship. In 1990, she founded the Galleria Carla Sozzani at 10 Corso Como in Milan. The gallery primarily focused on photography and published exhibition catalogues and books on the work of Walter Albini, Pierre Cardin, Rudi Gernreich, Paco Rabanne, as well as numerous photographers. She subsequently oversaw more than 250 exhibitions of photography and design, showcasing the works of artists such as Man Ray, Horst, Annie Leibovitz, Helmut Newton, David La Chapelle, Jean Prouvé, Marc Newson, Shiro Kuramata, Loretta Lux and Robert Polidori.

In 1991, Sozzani's gallery at 10 Corso Como was expanded to include a fashion and design store, a larger bookstore, a city garden café-restaurant, a hotel named Three Rooms, and a rooftop garden.

In 2001, Sozzani edited Talking to Myself with Yohji Yamamoto, which she co-published with Steidl. She also curated a photography exhibition at the Maison Européenne de la Photographie (MEP) in Paris. In 2002, she opened 10 Corso Como Comme des Garçons in Tokyo, a co-venture store with Rei Kawakubo. In 2008, in a joint venture with Samsung Group, she created 10 Corso Como in Seoul, a three-story location combining fashion, art, design, and cuisine, designed by Kris Ruhs. On 31 March 2012, 10 Corso Como opened its second location in Seoul, 10 Corso Como at Avenue L, also designed by Kris Ruhs.

In September 2013, Sozzani partnered with Trendy International Group to bring the 10 Corso Como concept to China. The new 10 Corso Como Shanghai opened in a freestanding glass building, featuring photography, fashion, design, music, cuisine, a pastry café, and an outdoor terrace surrounded by plants. In 2017, she established the Fondazione Sozzani, committed to advancing the quality and aesthetic depth of contemporary life by expanding knowledge of the history, execution, use, and presentation of both applied and fine arts. In the fall of 2018, she opened a branch of 10 Corso Como in New York at South Street Seaport, in collaboration with the Howard Hughes Corporation.
