= 10 Corso Como =

Shopping and dining complex in Milan, Italy

10 Corso Como is a shopping and dining complex in Milan, Italy with international locations in Tokyo, Seoul, and Shanghai. It combines outlets that show and sell works of art, fashion, music, design, cuisine and culture. It was founded in 1990 by gallerist and publisher Carla Sozzani.

== History ==
The complex began with an art gallery and a bookshop. Other spaces soon followed: a design and fashion store in 1991, the 10 Corso Como Cafè in 1998, a small hotel (with only three rooms) in 2003, and the Roof Garden in 2009.

10 Corso Como and the 10 Corso Como logo are designed by American artist Kris Ruhs. In 2002, 10 Corso Como opened in Tokyo in partnership with Comme des Garçons, designed by Rei Kawakubo and Kris Ruhs.

In 2008, 10 Corso Como opened in Seoul in partnership with Samsung Cheil, Samsung Group, designed by Kris Ruhs.

On 9 September 2011, 10 Corso Como celebrated its 20-year anniversary. On 31 March 2012, 10 Corso Como opened its second location in Seoul - 10 Corso Como at Avenue L, also designed by Kris Ruhs.

10 Corso Como Shanghai, designed by kris Ruhs, opened on 14 September 2013 at 1717 Nanjing West Road at Wheelock Square.

=== Recent history ===
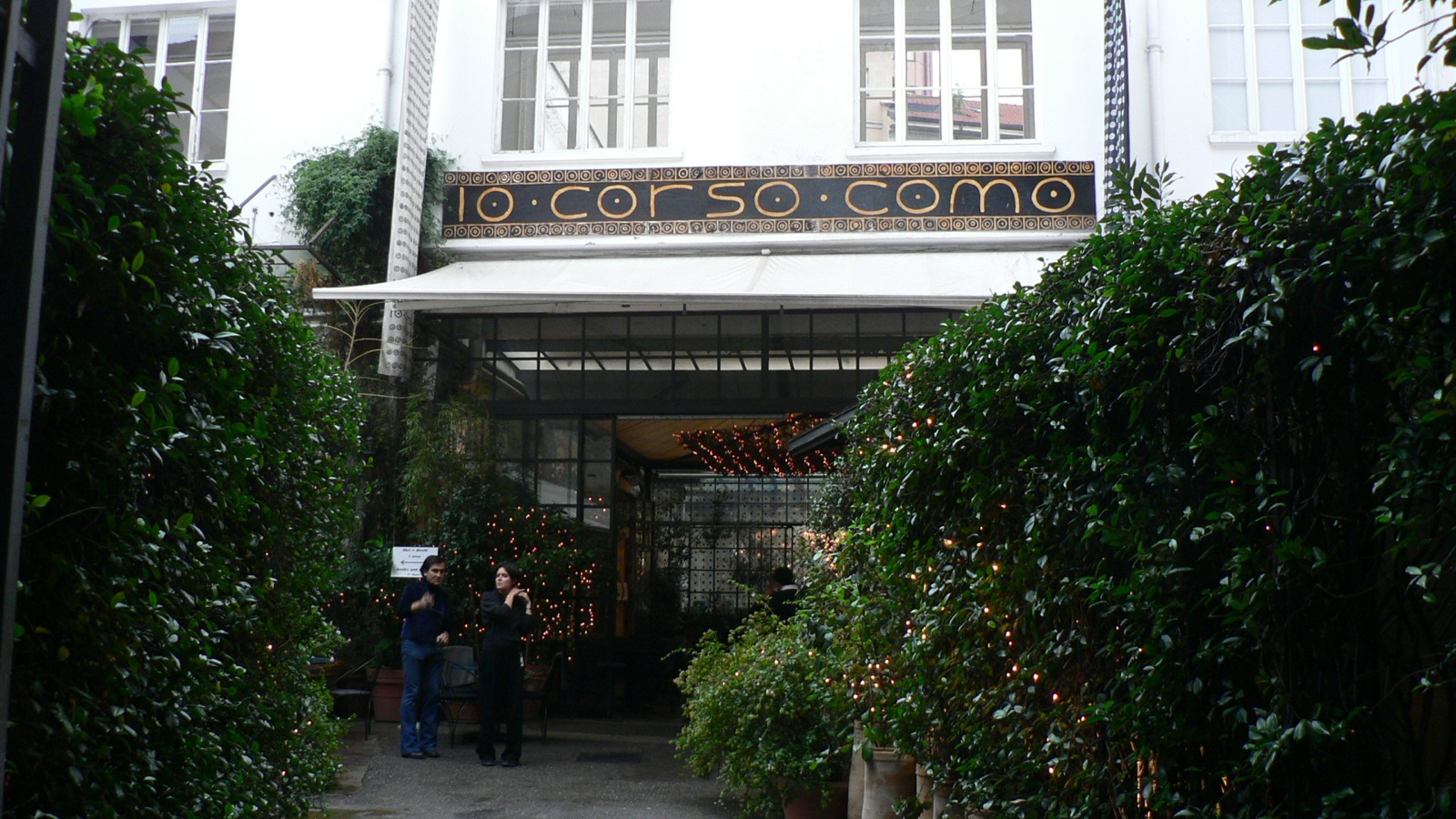
Entrance to the complex

In July 2017 it was announced that the original building in Milan, which houses an exhibition space, a library, a garden cafe and a research boutique in 3,000 square meters, was sold for just under €30 million to the founders and former owners of TwinSet, entrepreneur Tiziano Sgarbi and designer Simona Barbieri.

In September 2020 entrepreneur and high-profile retailer Tiziana Fausti announced the acquisition of 10 Corso Como, to expand and reinforce the presence of 10 Corso Como in the global market. In details: through Holding Exor, she took over 100% of the company KCS, the holding that owned Carla Sozzani Editore company, renamed TFC. As the owner of the trademark 10 Corso Como, TFC manages its licenses and the rental agreement of the prestigious property in Corso Como, 10 in Milan.

Through a newco named 10CC Global Shop, Holding Exor also signed a business branch rental agreement with Dieci srl for the management of the structure and the team of the concept store in all its activities, and with C TRE srl for the food services operations of 10 Corso Como Café.

Tiziana Fausti is President of TFC and 10CC Global Shop; Carla Sozzani continues the artistic direction of 10 Corso Como through photography and art exhibitions.

== In popular culture ==
The Cheongdam-dong store was used as a filming location for the music video of Psy's 2013 single "Gentleman".

== See also ==
- Dover Street Market
- Colette
- Bergdorf Goodman
- Barneys New York
