= Amy Astley =

American magazine editor (born 1967)

Amy Astley (born June 5, 1967) is the global editorial director and editor-in-chief of Architectural Digest She was editor of Teen Vogue, which she launched in January 2003. She was named to edit the new magazine in June 2002 by Anna Wintour, and editorial director of Teen Vogue.

== Career ==
Astley joined Vogue in 1993 and became Beauty Director the following year. Prior to Vogue, Astley was an Associate Editor at House & Garden for four years, after beginning as a decorating assistant in her early 20s. Astley was also the editor of Teen Vogue's four test issues, which were published from 2000 to 2002.

== Teen Vogue under Astley's direction ==
During Astley's tenure, Teen Vogue was nominated twice for a National Magazine Award for General Excellence (including in its launch year of 2003 in the 250,000-500,000 circulation category). In addition, Teen Vogue was named Adweek magazine's 2004 Startup of the Year. Teen Vogue's circulation rate base increased to 900,000 with the October 2006 issue from its previous level of 850,000. The magazine is produced in the new Euro magazine size (6-3/4" x 9-1/8"). Speaking to Forbes on her ten-year vision for Teen Vogue, Astley hoped to master digital domination, saying "We have to keep inspiring, surprising, entertaining and leading our audience on every platform from print to YouTube to the newest, latest innovation."

Astley’s 2009 New York Times best-seller, The Teen Vogue Handbook: An Insider's Guide to Careers in Fashion, was updated and reissued by Penguin in 2014.

== Architectural Digest ==
Astley joined Architectural Digest in 2016 and expanded it from being solely an extension of the print edition to include a social media presence, a hit video series on YouTube, and multiple digital-only verticals: AD PRO, a B2B membership service featuring authoritative coverage and breaking news for the design industry; Clever, which takes on the unique challenges of designing a smaller space; offering design advice for real life; and AD It Yourself, which features elevated DIY projects and actionable advice with content covering what to buy, what to do, and how to do it.

She is also the author of the book AD at 100: A Century of Style, which celebrates the most incredible homes of the past century.

Astley was named in Luxury Daily's Luxury Women to Watch 2023 list.

== Personal life ==
Astley holds a BA in English from the College of Arts and Letters at Michigan State University. She lives in Manhattan with her husband and their two daughters.

== Links ==
CBS interview with Amy Astley
