= Emanuele Farneti =

Italian journalist (born 1974)

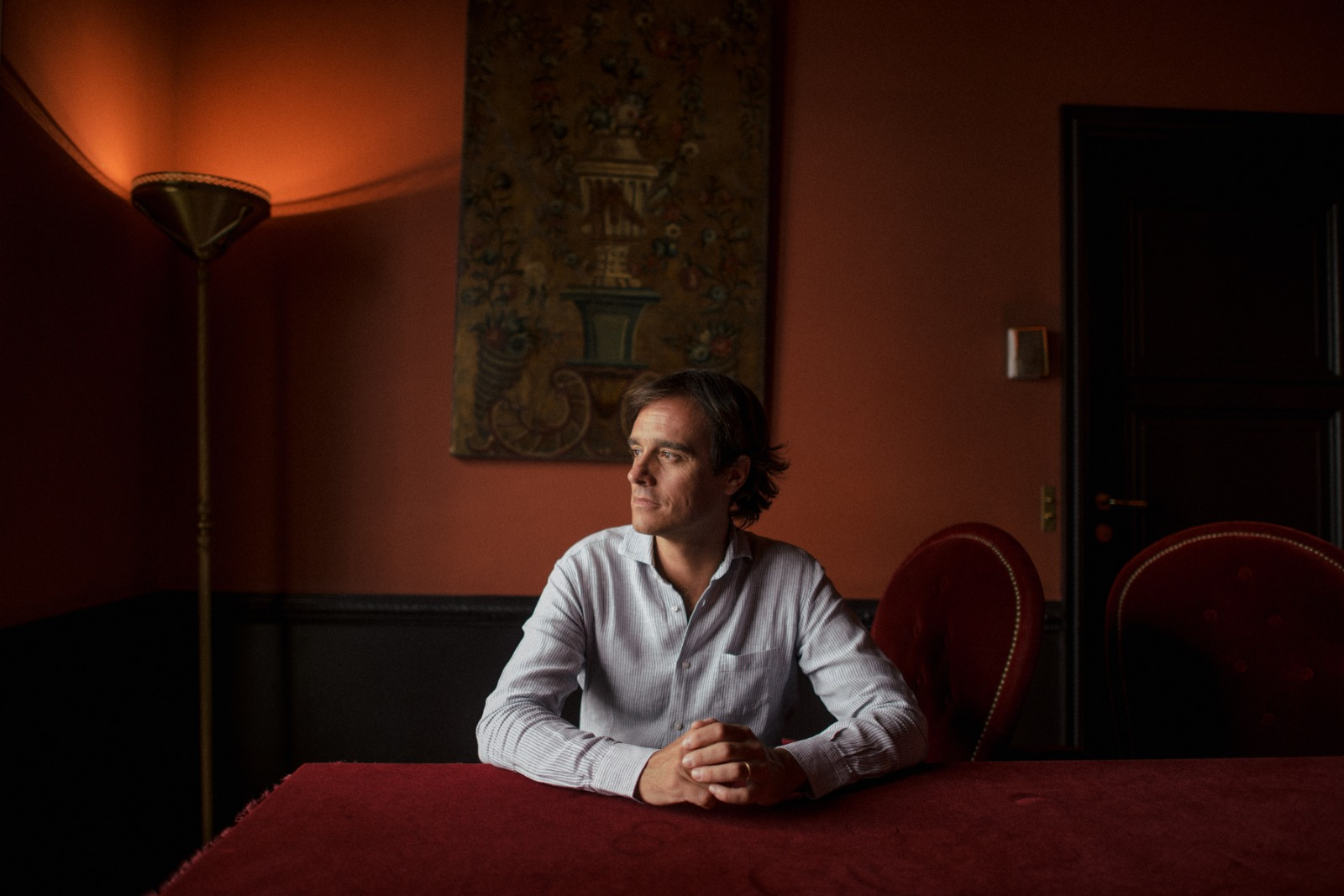
Farneti, photographed by Dmitry Kostyukov in 2017

Emanuele Farneti (born 1974), is an Italian journalist who is editor-in-chief of D la Repubblica, U la Repubblica, Door la Repubblica and deputy editor-in-chief of la Repubblica. He has previously worked as editor-in-chief of Vogue Italia.

== Early life ==
Farneti was born in Rome, Italy in 1974. He moved to Milan and attended high school at Liceo Classico Statale Tito Livio. He also achieved a doctorate of law from the University of Milan in 2000.

== Career ==
He started his career in television working at Sei Milano a small TV station, however in 1999 he joined Condé Nast and helped to launch Italian GQ. He then worked at La Gazzetta dello Sport, Sportweek, Men’s Health, Flair and Icon before returning to Condé Nast in 2014 when he became editor-in-chief of Architectural Digest Italia.

In 2013 he supervised the launch of the Spanish edition of Icon, Icon El País.

He was appointed editor-in-chief of GQ Italia in March 2016 and stated that he was planning on “communicating the Italian sense of style” to consumers and wanted to "be an authority in the market with a strong, unique point of view.”

After the death of longtime Italian Vogue editor Franca Sozzani in 2016, Farneti was named editor of the publication (along with L'Uomo Vogue) in January 2017. His first issue sold 74,000 copies (which was up by 16.7% from 2016).

He launched the 'Life in Vogue' project in 2018 which saw eight different interior designers redesign the Vogue Italia offices for Salone del Mobile. It happened again in 2019, and in 2021 it went virtual.

In 2020 he returned to Architectural Digest Italia as the interim editor-in-chief after Luca Dini (the magazines editor) exited Condé Nast.

He stepped down from his positions as editor-in-chief (Vogue Italia, L'Uomo Vogue, AD Italia) in 2021. He said in an Instagram post "Vogue is entering a new chapter: it is going global. And because the beginning of any new chapter must coincide with the end of the last, I have decided to step down as EIC of Vogue Italian when our September issue is complete,". At the time he was one in a string of editors who had all left different Vogue international publications between 2020 and 2021 (editor-in-chiefs of Vogue in Brazil, China, France, Germany and Spain).

=== Timeline ===
Timeline of his career:

- Editor at GQ Italia, 1999–2002
- Senior editor at La Gazzetta dello Sport, 2002 to 2004
- Editor-in-Chief of Sportweek (supplement to La Gazzetta dello Sport), 2004
- Editor-in-Chief of Men's Health Italia, 2004–2006
- Editor-in-Chief of First (supplement to Panorama), 2006–2009
- Deputy editor of Panorama (lifestyle section), 2009–2014
- Editor-in-Chief of Icon, 2010–2014
- Editor-in-Chief of Flair, 2011–2014
- Editor-in-Chief of Architectural Digest Italia, 2014–2015
- Editor-in-Chief of GQ Italia, 2016–2017
- Editor-in-Chief of Vogue Italia, 2017–2021
- Editor-in-Chief of L'Uomo Vogue, 2017–2021
- Editor-in-Chief of Architectural Digest Italia, 2020–2021
- Editor-in-Chief of D (supplement to la Repubblica), 2022–present
- Editor-in-Chief of Door (supplement to la Repubblica), 2023–present
- Editor-in-Chief of U (supplement to la Repubblica), 2024–present
- Editor-in-Chief of D The Biannual, 2024–present
- Deputy Editor of la Repubblica

== Personal life ==
His wife works at a digital marketing agency and they have two children.

Media offices
Preceded by Franca Sozzani	Editor-in-Chief of Vogue Italia; 2017–2021	Succeeded by Francesca Ragazzi
