= Amica (magazine) =

Women's fashion magazine in Italy

- Logo of Amica
- Editor-in-chief: Emanuela Testori
- Categories: Women's magazine; Fashion magazine
- Frequency: Monthly
- Circulation: 112,467 (August 2019)
- Publisher: RCS Periodici
- Founder: Franco Sartori
- Founded: 1962
- First issue: 1 March 1962; 63 years ago
- Company: RCS MediaGroup
- Country: Italy
- Based in: Milan
- Language: Italian
- Website: Amica
- ISSN: 2499-2984
- OCLC: 1322195868

Amica is a monthly fashion and women's magazine based in Milan, Italy. It has been in circulation since 1962. The magazine has several international editions published in Bulgaria, Indonesia and Singapore.

== History and profile ==
Amica was founded in March 1962 by Franco Sartori. The cover of its first issue was dedicated to Sophia Loren. The original publisher of the magazine was Crespi. The magazine is part of RCS MediaGroup and is published by RCS Periodici on a monthly basis in Milan. It offers articles on the recent fashion trends.

From 1986 to 2001 Casamica, a magazine on interior design, was distributed with Amica. Later it became a supplement of the daily paper Corriere della Sera, another publication of RCS MediaGroup. The online edition of Amica appeared in 1997.

The Bulgarian edition of the magazine was launched in late September 2007. Its editions in Indonesia and Singapore, published in English, were both started in 2008. In November 2011 the Italian edition was redesigned and began to include four sections: Stories, Fashion, Beauty, and Escape. At the end of 2014 the international edition of the magazine, Amica International, was started.

As of 2015 the editor-in-chief of Amica was Emanuela Testori.

== Circulation ==
Amica had a circulation of 209,638 copies in 1984. Between February 2006 and January 2007 the magazine sold 180,100 copies. Its circulation was 180,257 copies in 2007. From August 2010 to July 2011 the monthly had a circulation of 145,380 copies. In August 2019 Amica had paid circulation of 112,467 copies.

== See also ==
- List of magazines in Italy
