= Architectural Digest =

American monthly interior design and landscaping magazine

- January 2020 cover, highlighting the magazine's 100th anniversary
- Editor: Amy Astley
- Categories: Interior design
- Frequency: Monthly
- Total circulation: 814,959 (2013)
- Founded: 1920; 106 years ago
- Company: Condé Nast
- Country: United States
- Based in: New York City
- Language: English
- Website: architecturaldigest.com
- ISSN: 0003-8520

Logo used by international editions of the magazine

Architectural Digest (stylized in all caps) is an American monthly magazine founded in 1920. Its principal subjects are interior design and landscaping, rather than pure external architecture. The magazine is published by Condé Nast, which also publishes international editions of Architectural Digest in China, France, Germany, India, Italy, Mexico/Latin America, the Middle East, Poland, and Spain.

Architectural Digest is aimed at an affluent and style-conscious readership, and is subtitled "The International Design Authority." The magazine releases the annual AD100 list, which recognizes the most influential interior designers and architects around the world.

== History ==
Architectural Digest originated in 1920 as a quarterly trade directory titled The Architectural Digest: A Pictorial Digest of California's Best Architecture. The magazine was founded by John Coke Brasfield (1880–1962), a Tennessee-born publisher who moved to Southern California in the early 20th century. In Los Angeles, he established the John C. Brasfield Publishing Corporation, focusing on high-quality visual features of residential architecture, including floor plans, interiors, and exteriors.

Throughout the 1960s, the publication expanded its editorial scope. In 1963, the subtitle changed to A Pictorial Digest of Outstanding Architecture, Interior Design, and Landscaping, and the magazine adopted a bimonthly schedule. By 1965, Cleon T. Knapp, grandson of the founder and son of longtime editor Sarah "Sally" Brasfield Knapp, acquired the magazine. Under Knapp’s leadership, the publication transitioned to color and broadened its reach in the design community.

Reflecting its evolving identity, the magazine updated its subtitle multiple times: The Quality Guide to Home Decorating Ideas (1966), The Connoisseur’s Magazine of Fine Interior Design (1971), and The International Magazine of Fine Interior Design (1976). In 1977, the publishing entity was renamed Knapp Communications Corporation.

In 1993, Architectural Digest and its sister publication Bon Appétit were acquired by Condé Nast Publications, a major milestone in the magazine’s trajectory.

As a global brand, Architectural Digest has launched international editions in China (2011), as well as Germany, India, France, Italy, Poland, and Spain.

In 2020, the magazine received the Webby People's Voice Award for Architecture & Design in the Web category, honoring its digital innovation and design-forward content.

In 2022, Architectural Digest staff members joined the growing wave of media professionals unionizing at Condé Nast. That same year, the Russian edition ceased operations following Condé Nast’s withdrawal from the Russian market in response to the invasion of Ukraine.

== Editors ==
Countries	Circulation dates	Editor-in-Chief	Start year	End year
United States (Architectural Digest)	1920–present	John C. Brasfield	1920	1962
United States (Architectural Digest)	1920–present	Sally B. Knapp	1963	1964
United States (Architectural Digest)	1920–present	Bradley Little	1964	1971
United States (Architectural Digest)	1920–present	Paige Rense	1971	2010
United States (Architectural Digest)	1920–present	Margaret Russell	2010	2016
United States (Architectural Digest)	1920–present	Amy Astley	2016	present
Italy (Architectural Digest Italia)	1981–present	Ettore Mocchetti	1981	2015
Italy (Architectural Digest Italia)	1981–present	Emanuele Farneti	2015	2016
Italy (Architectural Digest Italia)	1981–present	Ettore Mocchetti	2016	2020
Italy (Architectural Digest Italia)	1981–present	Luca Dini	2020	2020
Italy (Architectural Digest Italia)	1981–present	Emanuele Farneti	2020	2021
Italy (Architectural Digest Italia)	1981–present	Francesca Santambrogio	2022	2025
Italy (Architectural Digest Italia)	1981–present	Asad Syrkett	2025	present
Germany (Architectural Digest Germany)	1997–present	Ulrike Filter	1997	1999
Germany (Architectural Digest Germany)	1997–present	Ingrid von Werz	1999	2000
Germany (Architectural Digest Germany)	1997–present	Margit J. Mayer	2000	2011
Germany (Architectural Digest Germany)	1997–present	Oliver Jahn	2011	2023
Germany (Architectural Digest Germany)	1997–present	Felix Wagner	2023	present
Mexico and Latin American (Architectural Digest México y Latinoamérica)	2000–present	Katia Contreras	2012	present
France (Architectural Digest France)	2000–present	Marina Hemonet		present
Russia (Architectural Digest Russia)	2002–2022	Anastasia Romashkevich		2022
Spain (Architectural Digest España)	2006–present	Maite Sebastiá		present
China (安邸 Architectural Digest)	2011–present	Beryl Hsu		
China (安邸 Architectural Digest)	2011–present	Yoyo Lu	2025	present
India (Architectural Digest India)	2012–present	Manju Sara Rajan	2012	2015
India (Architectural Digest India)	2012–present	Greg Foster	2015	2021
India (Architectural Digest India)	2012–present	Komal Sharma	2021	2025
India (Architectural Digest India)	2012–present	Mrinalini Ghadiok	2026	present
Middle East (Architectural Digest Middle East)	2015–present	Manuel Arnaut	2015	2017
Middle East (Architectural Digest Middle East)	2015–present	Talib Choudhry	2017	2025
Middle East (Architectural Digest Middle East)	2015–present	Aidan Imanova	2025	present
Poland (Architectural Digest Polska)	2023–present	Agnieszka Gruszczyńska-Hyc	2023	2025
Poland (Architectural Digest Polska)	2023–present	Magda Mazur	2025	present
