= The Hanging Sun =

- Italian theatrical release poster
- Directed by: Francesco Carrozzini
- Screenplay by: Stefano Bises
- Based on: Midnight Sun by Jo Nesbø
- Starring: Alessandro Borghi; Jessica Brown Findlay; Sam Spruell; Frederick Schmidt; Raphael Vicas; Peter Mullan; Charles Dance
- Cinematography: Nicolaj Bruel
- Edited by: Giuseppe Trepiccione
- Music by: Andrea Farri
- Production companies: Cattleya; Groenlandia; Sky Studios
- Distributed by: NBCUniversal Global Distribution; Vision Distribution
- Release dates: 10 September 2022 (Venice); 12 September 2022 (Italy)
- Running time: 93 minutes
- Countries: Italy; United Kingdom
- Language: English

The Hanging Sun is a 2022 Italian-British noir thriller film directed by Francesco Carrozzini, and starring Alessandro Borghi and Jessica Brown Findlay. It is an adaptation of the 2015 novel Midnight Sun by Jo Nesbø. The film had its world premiere as the closing film of the 79th Venice International Film Festival on 10 September 2022.

== Premise ==
John is on the run after betraying his powerful crime boss father. He travels north to evade his brother and takes refuge in an isolated village. The village is a small community of strict religious conformists. John grows close to a woman with a troubled past named Lea, becoming a father figure to her son Caleb. The two must find a way to break the ties to their past and start over.

== Cast ==
- Alessandro Borghi as John
- Jessica Brown Findlay as Lea
- Sam Spruell as Aaron and Nicolas
- Frederick Schmidt as Michael
- Raphael Vicas as Caleb
- Peter Mullan as Dad
- Charles Dance as Jacob
- Salóme Gunnarsdóttir as Anita
- Anton Valensi as Silas

== Production ==
A Sky Original film, The Hanging Sun is a U.K.-Italian co-production by Sky Studios, ITV Studios' Cattleya Producciones and Groenlandia.

== Release ==
The first trailer for the film was released on 31 August 2022. The film was chosen as the closing film of the 79th Venice International Film Festival, presented out of competition, and premiered on 10 September 2022. It was theatrically released in Italy on 12 September 2022.

== Reception ==
Anna Smith of Deadline called the film "a workable and good-looking thriller". Davide Abbatescianni of Cineuropa said, "Carrozzini successfully transposes a captivating story about hate and toxic family relationships to the big screen, assembling an effective cast and lending the movie great pace." Jonathan Romney of Screen Daily called the film a "bizarre mess from start to finish", criticizing the "oddness" of the accents employed by Borghi and others. Romney praised the performances of Dance and Mullan, but criticized the casting of Vicas and lamented that Brown Findlay's role was "largely restricted to being dourly long-suffering".
