= Margaret Russell =

Margaret Angèle Russell is a design journalist and a consultant specializing in media, architecture, interiors, and the cultural arts. She has served as the Honorary Dean of the School of Building Arts at the Savannah College of Art and Design (SCAD) since Fall 2017.

She was formerly the Editor in Chief of Galerie, a quarterly art and interiors publication.

From 2010 to 2016, Russell was the Editor in Chief of Architectural Digest.

Prior to joining AD, from 2000 to 2010, Russell served as Vice President/Editor in Chief of Elle Decor, a publication that she helped found in 1989. During her tenure, she created elledecor.com and produced the Elle Decor book series, including So Chic and Style and Substance, which she co-authored. Her first book, Designing Women: Interiors by Leading Style Makers was published in 2001.

Russell is a member of the Board of Trustees of the John F. Kennedy Center for the Performing Arts, and she serves on the Design Advisory Team for the Obama Presidential Center in Chicago, as a trustee of God's Love We Deliver, and on the advisory council of the Philip Johnson Glass House. She was a longtime trustee of the Kips Bay Boys & Girls Club and DIFFA.

Russell speaks regularly at design conferences and symposia and has appeared on numerous TV shows including Today, Good Morning America, and Charlie Rose, and she served as a judge on the two seasons of Bravo's Top Design. She was also featured in Iris, the Albert Maysles documentary on Iris Apfel.

A graduate of Brown University, Russell received an honorary doctorate in fine arts from the New York School of Interior Design in 2012 and an honorary doctor of humane letters from the Savannah College of Art and Design in 2014.
