= Franco Sartori =

Italian journalist (1929–1987)

Franco Sartori (1929 – 1987), was an Italian journalist and fashion editor, notably serving as editor-in-chief of Vogue Italia from 1966 until his death.

== Early life ==
Sartori was born in 1929 and was the son of the general manager of Milanese newspaper Corriere della Sera.

== Career ==
Sartori began his career in the marketing department of Corriere della Sera. He founded Amica in 1962.

In 1964, he joined Condé Nast and became editorial director of Condé Nast's recently acquired flagship Italian publication Novità. Novità was relaunched as the Italian edition of Vogue that same year and in 1965 it became Vogue Italia & Novità. In 1966, Sartori became editor-in-chief of the magazine, now branded as Vogue Italia. Under Sartori the magazine became more aligned with its American counterpart, however, Sartori would later be remembered for reshaping the publication into one of the most sophisticated fashion publications.

To celebrate 20 years of Italian Vogue, Sartori oversaw an exhibition on the magazine at Milan's Piazza del Duomo in 1984.

== Death ==
Sartori died in New York City in 1987 following a heart transplant.

== Bibliography ==
- 20 Anni di Vogue 1964–1984 (Edizioni Condé Nast, 1984)

Media offices
Preceded by Lidia Tabacchi	Editor of Vogue Italia; 1966–1988	Succeeded by Franca Sozzani
