= Cushnie (fashion house) =

American fashion business

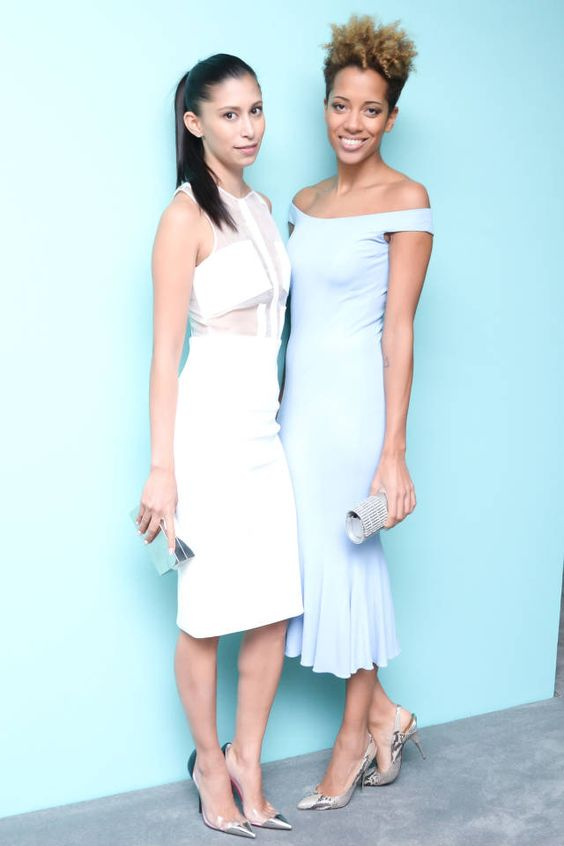
- Carly Cushnie
- Formerly: Cushnie et Ochs
- Industry: Fashion
- Founded: 2008, New York City
- Founders: Carly Cushnie; Michelle Ochs
- Products: Clothes; Accessories
- Website: www.cushnie.com

Cushnie (formerly known as Cushnie et Ochs) is an American fashion house founded in 2008 by Carly Cushnie and Michelle Ochs, upon their graduation from Parsons School of Design. Their signature looks are clean, modern cut-out dresses, sculpted knitwear, and tailored pieces best known for impeccable fit. Their work is described as a "sleek, sexy and modern," and the pair are known to wear their own clothing often.

Cushnie et Ochs published their first ad campaign in 2011. The duo received a massive increase in publicity when First Lady Michelle Obama wore one of their dresses to a holiday party in December 2011, and again in 2016 on The Late Show with Stephen Colbert. Their pieces have been spotted on influential women ranging from Blake Lively to Khloé Kardashian, cementing the brand as a staple in celebrity dressing both on and off the red carpet.

In 2016, Cushnie et Ochs sold a minority interest in the company to Farol Asset Management and several other investors. The brand also opened its first brick and mortar location in collaboration with the Council of Fashion Designers of America, in a temporary "Retail Lab" space in the Cadillac showroom in TriBeCa, New York City.

After the February 2018 New York Fashion Week, in which Cushnie et Ochs presented its tenth anniversary collection, the brand announced that Ochs would be leaving the company.

In May 2020 Cushnie launched a highly successful collaboration line for Target. The collaboration quickly sold out, and gave the line broader brand awareness. The brand received additional support and awareness in 2020 as a black-designed and -owned fashion line.

In October 2020, founder Cushnie announced the closure of the 12-year-old company. Cushnie said that COVID-19 hurt her business and it couldn't survive.

In June 2023, Michelle Ochs was appointed creative director of Hervé Léger. She still runs her own line called Et Ochs.
