= L'Uomo Vogue =

Italian fashion magazine

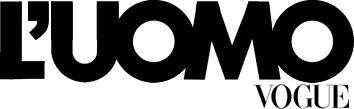
- Categories: Fashion
- Frequency: Bi-annual (1967 to 1968); Quarterly (1969 to 1968); Monthly (? to 2017); Quarterly (2018 to 2021)
- Publisher: Edizioni Condé Nast
- First issue: September 1967
- Final issue: December 2021
- Country: Italy
- Based in: Milan
- Language: Italian (1967–2017); English (2018–2021)
- ISSN: 1556-4096

L'Uomo Vogue (stylised in all caps) was the men's edition of the Italian fashion magazine Vogue Italia. The magazine was launched in 1967, a brief break occurred between 2017 and 2018, and it ceased publication in 2021.

== Background ==
L'Uomo Vogue men's edition of the Italian magazine Vogue Italia. The magazine was published quarterly in its final years. It was the second men's edition of Vogue, as British Vogue had launched Men in Vogue two years prior.

=== Editors ===
Editor	Start year	End year	Ref.
Original (1967–2017)
Franco Sartori	1967	1976	
Flavio Lucchini	1976	1979	
Cristina Brigidini	1979	1992	
Aldo Premoli	1992	2000	
Anna Dello Russo	2000	2006	
Paola Bottelli	2006	2006	
Franca Sozzani	2006	2016	
Emanuele Farneti	2017	2017	
Revival (2018–2021)
Emanuele Farneti	2018	2021	

== History ==
To celebrate the magazines fortieth anniversary a party was held at the Palazzo Litta in Milan in 2008. The event was organised by Sozzani and numerous celebrities and creatives attended including Giorgio Armani, Naomi Campbell, Tom Ford, Janet Jackson, John Malkovich, Tilda Swinton, Donatella Versace, Anna Wintour and more.

In July of 2017, Condé Nast announced that it would be closing L'Uomo Vogue after the release of its December issue, wanting to focus on its "top brands".

However, in 2018 almost a year after the closure announcement, the magazine relaunched as a quarterly publication. It had increased in size and was now in English instead of Italian with Farneti stating, "That's the international language and it's an international magazine".

== See also ==
- Men's Vogue, American and international editions
