= Bandage dress =

Tight-fitting garment

A bandage dress is a tight-fitting bodycon dress that appears to be made from multiple thin strips of cloth sewn together, with the individual strips shaped like bandages. The bandage dress was created by Azzedine Alaïa and is most closely associated with the designer Hervé Léger.

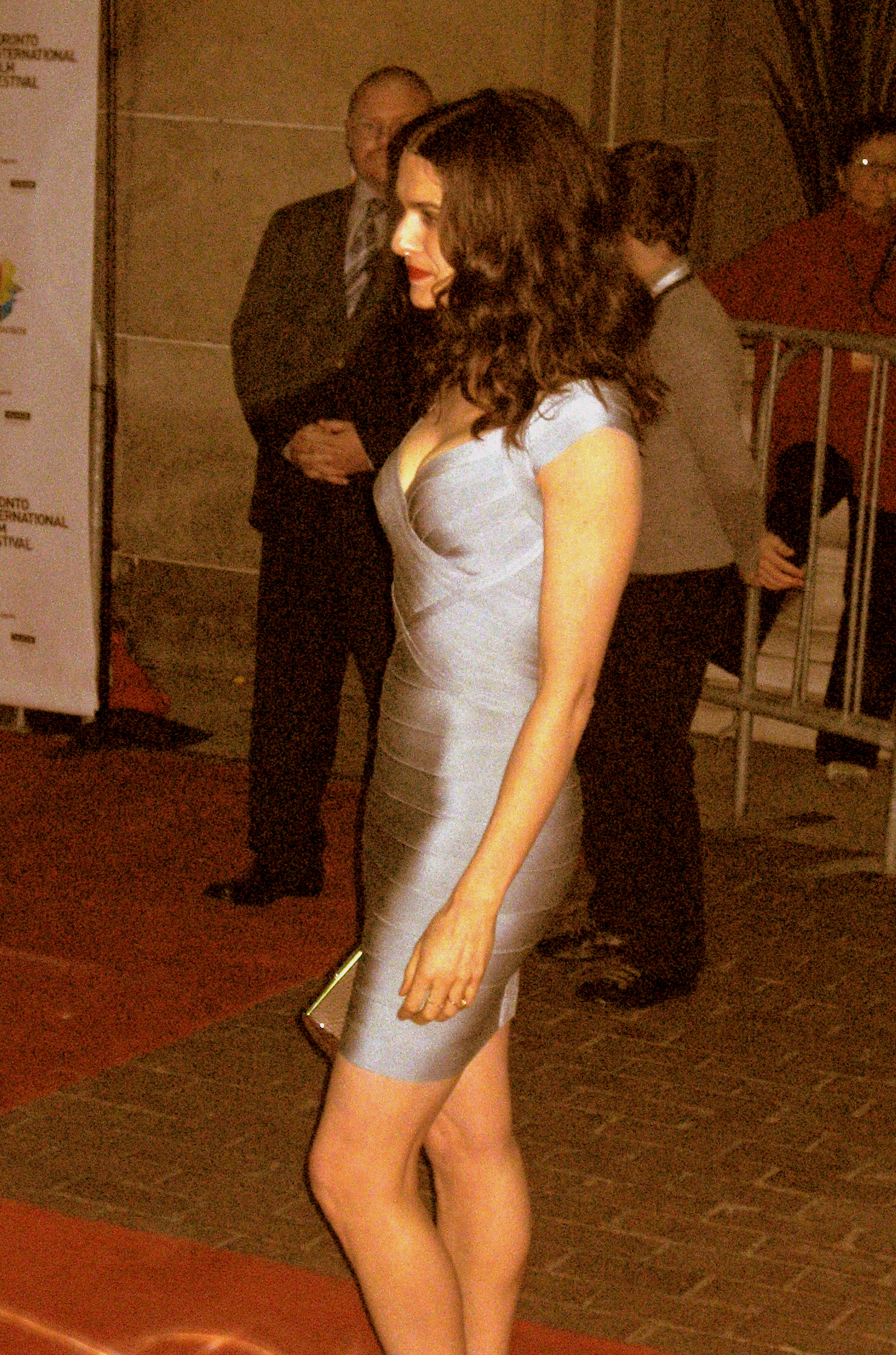
Actress Rachel Weisz wearing a bandage dress in 2008 at the Toronto International Film Festival.

== Description ==
According to Max Azria, "[a] bandage dress isn't a woven, it's all knitted on a knitting machine and is a completely different concept...People assume it's cut-and-sew, but there's no cutting. It's knitted in a panel and then attached". Bandage dresses are noted for accommodating a broad variety of body styles due to the stretchy fabric.

== History ==
Azzedine Alaïa, the "King of Cling", included bandage dresses in his collections in the mid-1980s. Singer Grace Jones wore a bandage dress from the designer's spring/summer 1986 collection as she carried him onstage to accept his Best Designer of the Year award at the 1985 Oscars de la Mode.

Hervé Léger introduced his own bandage dresses in the early 1990s. A 1993 New York Times review of one of his runway shows remarked that his apparent specialty was "girdle-tight dresses" made from strips of fabric, creating what they termed the "sexy mummy look". When BCBG Max Azria acquired Léger's brand in the late 1990s, the bandage dress reached a wider audience, with sales peaking at $10.6 million in 1998. After BCBG Max Azria released a capsule collection of the Hervé Léger dress in 2007, bandage dresses enjoyed a period of red carpet ubiquity lasting through the early 2010s.

The bandage dress enjoyed a new wave of popularity in 2025, with the dress gaining prominence among the Generation Z social media users on platforms like TikTok.
