= Kris Ruhs =

American painter and sculptor (born 1952)

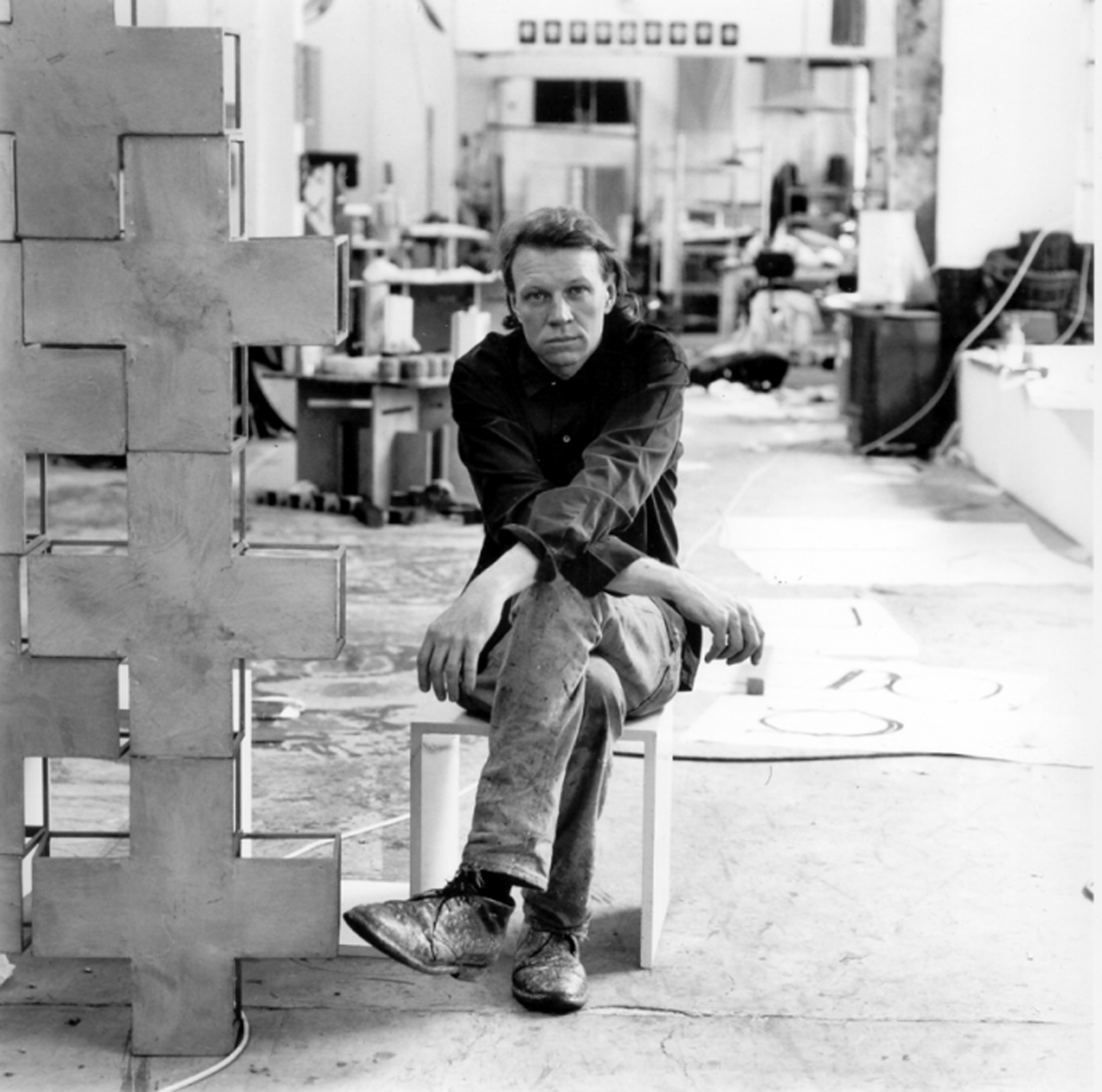
- Ruhs in his studio, 2010
- Born: March 7, 1952; Queens, New York, U.S.
- Education: School of Visual Arts, New York City

Kris Ruhs (New York City, March 7, 1952) is an American painter and sculptor. He also works on drawing, graphic arts, jewelry, ceramics and furniture designs.

== Early life ==
Kris Andrew Ruhs was born in Queens, New York, on March 7, 1952, from a family of German extraction.

He grew up in New York City and from 1970 to 1973 attended The School of Visual Arts with Richard Artschwager.

== Career ==
In the 1970s worked on commercial assignments for various New York publications and emporiums. Had a group show with Art Consultant Elisabeth Ives Bartholet and a first solo show at Caravan House.

During this time Ruhs began the exploration of found materials that would remain one of the hallmarks of his work going forward. Moved studio from 168 East 66th Street to 45 West 18th Street.

In the 1980s: solo show at Richard Greene Gallery and began showing with Gary Lajeski and the Tower Gallery: New York and South Hampton. Several solo and group shows through the decade.

He began his first series of sculptures inspired by the wood discarded in the streets next to his studio on lower Broadway. Discards of various shapes and sizes became favored materials for him. Old wood is cut, scraped, carved, painted over and burned to give a new surface and shape that carries a deep, metaphorical weight.

These initial works of the 1980s will go on to create the template of future work and the artist's relationship to other materials. Collaborates with Cynthia Lennon on Atlanta mural. Develops ARTWEAR branding with friend Robert Lee Morris and starts making jewellery himself.

In the early 1990s Ruhs moved his studio from Chelsea to Lower Broadway and began his transition to Europe.

In the mid-1990s Ruhs closed his studio in New York and moved to a new studio in the heart of industrial Milan in two huge warehouse buildings with an interior courtyard.

The new location giving him space to work on the big sculptural pieces and installation. At this time he begins his experiments with ceramics and started a cycle of large metal sculptures.

He makes editorial illustrations for Italian Vogue., works on different design assignments in Berlin, Seoul and Tokyo. as well as on big sculptural pieces and installation.

He designs furniture art pieces, first produced in 1991 by Giulio Cappellini for Cappellini Arte and creates architectural installations and furniture design.

He creates jewelry art pieces in ebony, brass, silver and gold for collectors and designers with the same dimensional aspects as his other artworks.

In the late 1990s Ruhs starts a studio in Paris in the 18th district, an industrial metal-framed building of the Eiffel period. As he continued to pursue his personal art, his reputation as a designer leads to several assignments around the world

== Publications ==
- Kris Ruhs, Jewellery, Carla Sozzani Editore. Numbered edition of 1000 copies. Photographs by Vanni Burkhart and Ilvio Gallo. Designed by Claudio Dell'Olio. Printed by Nava web spa, Milan, 2009. 360 pages – 30x24 cm. Illustrations. ISBN 978-88-7942-846-0
- Kris Ruhs, Oil on Paper and Collages 1999–2000, Carla Sozzani Editore. Numbered edition of 1000 copies. Designed by Claudio Dell'Olio. Printed by Nava web spa, Milan, 2007. 66 pages – 30x40 cm. 39 illustrations. ISBN 978-88-7942-845-3
- Kris Ruhs, Ceramics, Carla Sozzani Editore. Numbered edition of 1000 copies. Photographs by Vanni Burkhart. Designed by Claudio Dell'Olio. Printed by Nava web spa, Milan, 2006. 114 pages – 24,5x26 cm. 104 illustrations. ISBN 978-88-7942-843-9
- Kris Ruhs, Works on paper, texts Susan Bachelder, Carla Sozzani Editore. Numbered Edition of 2000 copies. Photographs by Vanni Burkhart, Lorenzo Camocardi, Ilvio Gallo, Kasskara, Barbara Kazs, Douglas Kirkland. Designed by Claudio Dell'Olio. Printed by Nava web spa, Milan 2006. 276 pages – 30,5x30 cm. 245 illustrations. ISBN 978-88-7942-844-6

== Solo exhibitions ==
- 2012 "Landing on Earth", The Wapping Project, London
- 2012 "Resonances", Galleria Carla Sozzani, Milan
- 2010 "Jewellery", Galleria Carla Sozzani, Milan
- 2005 "Stones", Galleria Carla Sozzani, Milan
- 2004 "Rain Labyrinth", Crossings Gallery, Hamburg
- 2002 "One Room", Galleria Carla Sozzani, Milan
- 2001 "Installations", Galleria Carla Sozzani, Milan
- 1999 "Red Light Installation" Galleria Carla Sozzani, Milan
- 1995 "Labirinto", Galleria Carla Sozzani, Milan
- 1990 Inaugural Solo Exhibition, Galleria Carla Sozzani, Milan
- 1989 Artwear, AT&T Building, New York
- 1988 Richard Greene Gallery, Los Angeles, CA.
- 1987 "Kris Ruhs Untitled Theatre", Richard Greene Gallery, New York
- 1986 "Recent Constructions", Richard Greene Gallery, New York
- 1985 "New Paintings and Constructions", Tower Gallery, New York
- 1984 "Constructions", Tower Gallery, New York
- 1983 Tower Gallery, New York
- 1982 Tower Gallery, Southampton, New York
- 1980 "Paintings", Caravan House, New York

== Group exhibitions ==
- 1993 "Three Voices: Franco Albini, Rei Kawakubo, Kris Ruhs", Galleria Carla Sozzani, Milan
- 1991 "One Room: Marc Newson, Tom Dixon, Kris Ruhs", Galleria Carla Sozzani, Milan
- 1989 Gallery Helene Grubair, Miami, Fla.
- 1988 Gallery Helene Grubair, Miami, Fla.
- 1986 "Arts as Toys", St. Louis, Mo.
- 1986 Galerie Lezard, Paris
- 1986 "Painting in the third dimension", Gallery Camino Real, Boca Raton, Fla.
- 1985 "Reliefs and Mobiles", Tower Gallery, New York
- 1985 "On and Off the Walls" Pan Arts, Brooklyn, New York
- 1985 Summer Group Show, Tower Gallery, Southampton, New York
- 1983 Opening Group Show, Tower Gallery, New York
- 1982 Dorfman Gallery, New York
- 1980 Stonybrook University Art Center, Stonybrook, New York
- 1979 "Painting and sculpture", Bartholet Gallery, New York
- 1979 Tower Gallery, Southampton, New York
- 1975 "Alumni Exhibition", School of Visual Arts, New York
- 1973 "Annual Members Exhibitions", School of Visual Arts, New York
