= Franca Sozzani =

Italian journalist (1950–2016)

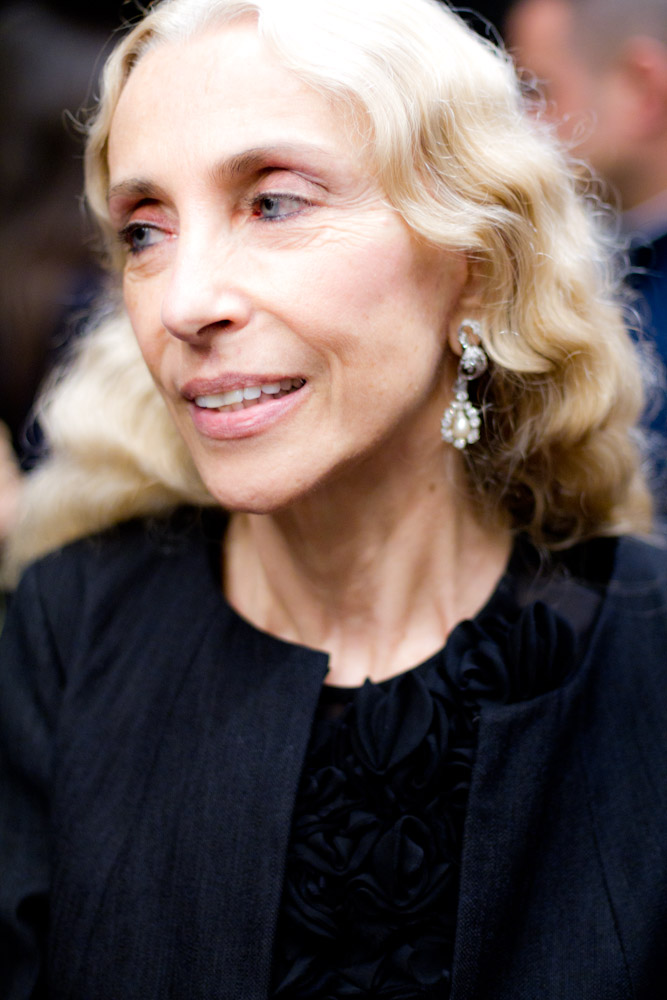
- Sozzani in 2010
- Born: 20 January 1950; Mantua, Italy
- Died: 22 December 2016 (aged 66); Milan, Italy
- Occupation: Magazine editor
- Title: Editor-in-chief, Vogue Italia
- Children: Francesco Carrozzini
- Relatives: Carla Sozzani (sister)

Franca Sozzani (Italian pronunciation: [ˈfraŋka sotˈtsaːni]; 20 January 1950 – 22 December 2016) was an Italian journalist and the editor-in-chief of Vogue Italia from 1988 until her death in 2016.

== Biography ==
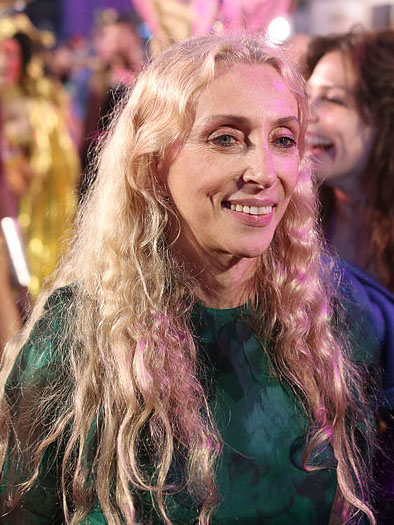
Life Ball 2013 - magenta carpet Franca Sozzani

Sozzani was born and grew up in Mantua, Lombardy, northern Italy. She studied Germanic languages and literature and philosophy at Università Cattolica del Sacro Cuore in Milan, graduating in 1973.

She married at the age of 20; the union was dissolved three months later.

Sozzani's career began as an assistant at the children's fashion magazine Vogue Bambini in 1976. She directed the publications Lei beginning in 1980 and Per Lui starting in 1982 before heading up Vogue Italia in 1988.

In the 1990s, Sozzani helped create the phenomenon of the supermodel with one of her closest long-term collaborators, Steven Meisel. She also championed a group of photographers including Bruce Weber, Peter Lindbergh, and Paolo Roversi, Michel Comte giving them complete freedom to choose models and subjects, and encouraging them to experiment with their work. She was appointed editor-in-chief of Condé Nast Italia in 1994.

In 2010, Sozzani published a selection of her blog posts from the "Editor's Notes" pages of Vogue.it as a book, I capricci della moda.

As well as her editorial writing, Sozzani also wrote photography and art books among them "British Artists at Work" with photographer Amanda Eliasch. Sozzani provided text for exhibition catalogues, often collaborating with other writers, journalists and artists on publications. In 2006, she became editor of L'Uomo Vogue and in February 2011, she launched Vogue Curvy, staffed by plus-size bloggers who offer fashion tips for the full-figured. In September 2015, she took over editorship of Vogue Sposa and Vogue Bambini.

Sozzani died of lung cancer on 22 December 2016, at the age of 66. A Catholic memorial service was held for Sozzani on 17 February 2017 in Milan.

== Style ==
Sozzani was known for including topics and issues in her magazine which other fashion publications avoided, such as domestic violence, drug abuse and recovery, and the Gulf of Mexico oil spill of 2010. Issues of her magazine included "The Black Issue" (which featured only models of colour), "Makeover" (discussing plastic surgery) and "Rebranding Africa".

Sozzani collaborated with artists Maurizio Cattelan and Vanessa Beecroft on exhibits and performances. She also curated several exhibitions and retrospectives, including: 30 Years of Italian Vogue (Mario Testino), Vietnam Story and My Own Story in Vogue (Bruce Weber), Women (Peter Lindbergh), and Portraits of Elegance (Milan Triennale), as well as Francesco Scavullo.

== Awards and charity work ==
In 2012, Sozzani was awarded the Legion of Honour by French president Nicolas Sarkozy. The same year she became a United Nations goodwill ambassador. In 2014, she was named a global ambassador against hunger for the United Nations' World Food Programme and received the Swarovski Fashion Award for Positive Change in 2016.

Sozzani contributed to a number of charitable organisations. She was a founding member of Child Priority – a non-profit organization created by Condé Nast to offer concrete study and work opportunities for those who have none despite being talented and artistically gifted. In addition, she worked with the AIDS organisation Convivo and from March 2013 she was the president of the European Institute of Oncology Foundation.

== Publications ==
- A Noir: An exploration of the colour Black between fashion and art, (1986), published by Assouline
- 30 Years of Italian Vogue (1994)
- Visitors: 20 Museums for the Florence Biennale of Fashion and Art (1996), co-written with Luigi Settembrini, published by Skira Editore
- Style in Progress: 30 years of L'Uomo Vogue (1998)
- Dolce & Gabbana (1999), published by Thames & Hudson
- Valentino's Red Book (2000), credited with original concept, published by Rizzoli International
- Work in progress: photography (2001), co-written with James Truman, published by Art Books International
- British Artists At Work: An itinerary among the most important British artists of the time, credited with original concept, published by Assouline (2003)
- I capricci della moda (2010), published by Bompiani
- Emerald: twenty-one centuries of jewelled opulence and power (2013), co-written with Joanna Hardy, Jonathan Self and Hettie Judah, published by Thames & Hudson
- kARTell – 150 items, 150 artworks (2016), published by Skira Editore

== Family ==
Sozzani had one son, Francesco Carrozzini (born 1982), a photographer and director. Her sister, Carla Sozzani, is the owner of 10 Corso Como, a Milan photography gallery and store. Sozzani's niece, Sara Maino, is an editor at Italian Vogue.

Media offices
Preceded by Franco Sartori	Editor-in-Chief of Vogue Italia; 1988–2016	Succeeded by Emanuele Farneti
