= Vogue Italia =

Italian fashion magazine

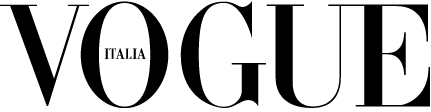

- 30th Anniversary (October 1994) cover
- Head of Editorial Content: Francesca Ragazzi
- Categories: Fashion
- Frequency: Monthly
- Circulation: 100,000 (2017)
- Publisher: Condé Nast
- First issue: October 1964
- Company: Vogue Italia
- Country: Italy
- Based in: Milan
- Language: Italian
- Website: vogue.it

Vogue Italia is the Italian edition of Vogue magazine owned by Condé Nast International. In publication since 1964, it has been called the top fashion magazine in the world. The publication is currently edited by Francesca Ragazzi and was previously edited by Emanuele Farneti, Franca Sozzani and others.

== Background ==
Vogue Italia is the Italian edition of the American fashion magazine Vogue. The magazine is published twelve times per year.

Launched in 1950 by Emilia Kuster Rosselli as Novità the magazine was loosely inspired by American fashion publications Harper's Bazaar and Vogue, however it had a distinct Italian style. Rosselli had previously been editor-in-chief of Grazia. In 1958 Rosselli died and Lidia Tabacchi became editor of the publication.

It was in March 1962 that Condé Nast acquired the publication, and the October 1964 edition (still titled Novità) with Wilhelmina Cooper (photographed by Irving Penn) on the cover is cited as the launch issue of Vogue Italia. However it was not until the November 1965 issue that the publication became Vogue Italia & Novità and then from June 1966 Vogue Italia.

=== Editors ===
Editor	Start year	End year
Lidia Tabacchi	1964	1966
Franco Sartori	1966	1988
Franca Sozzani	1988	2016
Emanuele Farneti	2017	2021
Head of editorial content
Francesca Ragazzi	2021	present

=== Editions ===
Since beginning publication in 1964, Vogue Italia has launched numerous other editions of the magazine, which are listed below. However as of today only Vogue Italia is still in publication.

- Casa Vogue (1968–2021)
- Vanity
- L'Uomo Vogue (1967–2017, 2018–2021)
- Vogue Accessory (closed in 2017)
- Vogue Bambini (closed in 2017)
- Vogue Bellezza (launched in 1981, later closed)
- Vogue Gioiello (1980–2015)
- Vogue Pelle (launched in 1980, later closed)
- Vogue Speciale
- Vogue Sposa (closed in 2017)

== History ==
=== 1966–1988: The Franco Sartori Years ===
In 1966, Franco Sartori was appointed editor-in-chief and the magazine changed the name from Vogue Italia & Novità to Vogue Italia. The first issue with the new name was published in June 1966. Also during this time Consuelo Crespi served as the magazines 'Roman editor'. Sartori held the position of editor until his 1987 death, the last issue under his supervision would be published in 1988. During his leadership Vogue Italia was augmented by a string of sister publications, including L'Uomo Vogue and Vogue Bambini.

=== 1988–2016: Franca Sozzani years ===
In 1988, Franca Sozzani (1950–2016) became the second editor-in-chief for the publication, with the July/August 1988 issue her first. Before editing Vogue Italia, Sozzani worked as editor for Vogue Bambini, and as editor-in-chief for Lei and subsequently for Per Lui, the men's edition of the former. After seeking new possibilities, the Italian journalist accepted the offer to edit Vogue Italia. American fashion photographer Steven Meisel shot almost every single cover and main spread under her time at Vogue. Beginning in the mid-1990s, the magazine distanced itself from sister editions and other titles with commercial appeal and moved closer to the independent publications of the time, developing an artistic and intellectual perspective with distinctive images, themes and subjects. Unlike other editions of Vogue, Sozzani continued to use models as cover stars, with a few exceptions.

Since 2005 Vogue Italia published a series of issues inspired by social topics, starting with the young Hollywood/Paparazzi special that year (January), followed by the plastic surgery portfolio (July 2005); the privacy loss and paranoia post 11/S (September 2006); celebrities going rehab (July 2007); the Iraq War (September 2007); the swine flu outbreak (November 2009); webcams and social media (January 2007 and December 2009); The oil spill in the Gulf of Mexico (August 2010); the Body positivity movement (June 2011), and domestic violence (April 2014). For the September 2008 issue Steven Meisel photographed a group of models inspired by the dogging sexual practice. Franca Sozzani refused to publish the story, which ended as part of the fall fashion issue of "V Magazine".

The most notorious special was released in July 2008. Editor Franca Sozzani published the all-black issue, featuring only black models and personalities in the whole issue.

On 22 December 2016 Franca Sozzani died at the age of 66.

=== 2017–present: Emanuele Farneti years and re-structure ===
On 20 January 2017, it was officially announced by Jonathan Newhouse, CEO of Condé Nast International, that Emanuele Farneti would be the new editor-in-chief of Vogue Italia and L'Uomo Vogue. Farneti was the director of eight different magazines, being the latest GQ Italia.

In July 2017, it was announced that Condé Nast Italia would fold L'Uomo Vogue, Vogue Accessory, Vogue Bambini and Vogue Sposa, in order to focus on top brands, such as Vogue Italia and GQ among others.

A year later, Farneti relaunched L'Uomo Vogue as a biannual publication. In July 2021 Farneti left the magazine after the publication of the September issue of the same year.

In early September 2021, it was confirmed that the magazine would no longer feature an editor-in-chief but will be led by a head of editorial content, a position assigned to former fashion market director Francesca Ragazzi. In her new role, Ragazzi reported to Anna Wintour and to Vogue European editorial director Edward Enninful.

== Content ==
Vogue Italia and the Italian fashion industry have historically had a symbiotic relationship, with Vogue Italia contributing to Milan's prominence in the fashion world.

Recent influential editorials have included Steven Meisel's September 2006 "State of Emergency", a visual play on the war on terror, and Meisel's July 2007 "Rehab", addressing recent celebrity visits to rehab clinics. and the August 2010 Issue, featuring Kristen McMenamy, shooting on the site of the BP Oil Spill in the Gulf of Mexico.

== Remix Contest ==
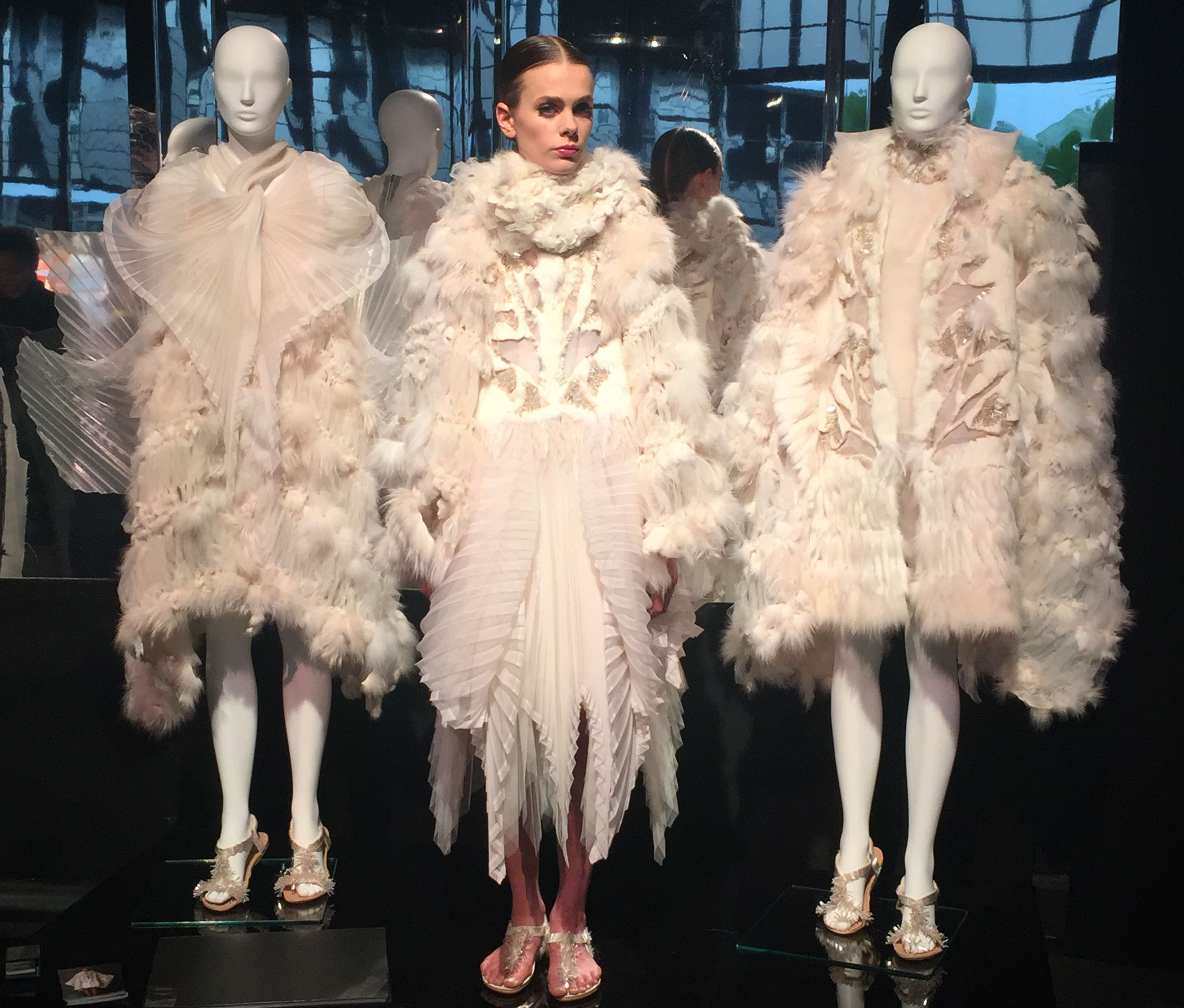
Fur project designed for the Remix contest by Daniel Kohavi

Vogue Italia hosts their annual "Remix Contest" (in-association with the International Fur Federation) to provide a platform for up-and-coming designers. The contest was first launched in 2004.

In 2019, Netherlands-born designer Berivan Cemal won the event; the judges' panel included Vogue talent Sara Sozzani Maino, expert of fur sustainability Samantha De Reviziis, Italian designer Gabriele Colangelo and Filipino fashion influencer Bryanboy.

== All-Black issue ==
The July 2008 issue of Vogue Italia featured only black models (photographed by Steven Meisel), with the articles pertaining to black women in the media, arts and entertainment. The magazine claimed to release this issue as a response to widespread criticism that fashion magazines, worldwide, do not feature more black cover models. Industry insiders have claimed that advertisers believe any magazine issue featuring a black cover model is "unable" to sell, or will sell considerably less than issues with non-black cover models. This belief, along with the formation of a protest group in New York City that challenges racism in the industry, convinced Italian Vogue's editor, Franca Sozzani to create this issue. It became the highest-selling issue of Italian Vogue in history, and had run-out of print twice, which marked the first time in Condé Nast history that the magazine reprinted an issue to satisfy demand. The reprinted copies displayed headlines as "Most Wanted Issue Ever" and "First Reprint".

However, even though the advertising pages increased by 30%, there was a "glaring lack of black models" in the issue. Meisel said: "I've asked my advertising clients so many times, 'Can we use a black girl?' They say no. Advertisers say black models don't sell."

== VogueEncyclo ==
VogueEncyclo is a fashion encyclopedia founded by Vogue Italia (Condé Nast Digital). It went live on 10 October 2011. It has an archive with topics ranging from A–Z: fashion and costume, designers, photography, cinema, people, mania, bloggers, fabrics and architecture. Anyone is free to participate, all articles have bylines and Vogue staff reviews all submissions.

The whole of the content is accessible in either English or Italian.

== Contributors ==
- Isa Stoppi (Fashion editor, 1970s)

== See also ==
- List of Vogue Italia cover models
- List of magazines in Italy
