= Christian Forestier =

French academic and civil servant (1944–2025)

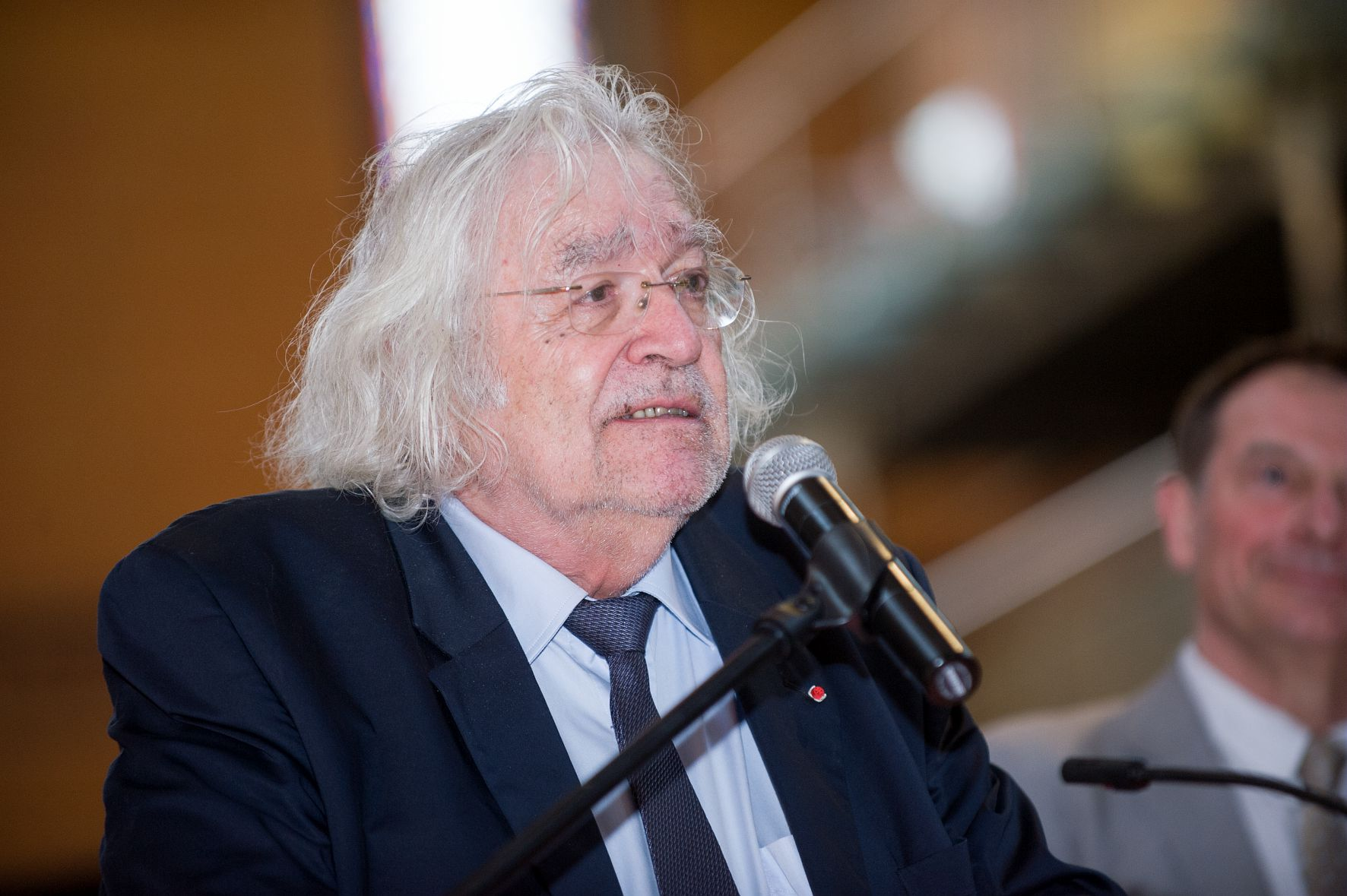
- Forestier in 2017

General Administrator of the Conservatoire national des arts et métiers
- In office August 2008 – August 2013
- Preceded by: Laurence Paye-Jeanneney
- Succeeded by: Olivier Faron

Rector of the Academy of Versailles
- In office January 1998 – March 2000
- Preceded by: Armand Frémont
- Succeeded by: Daniel Bancel

Rector of the Academy of Creteil
- In office 1989–1992
- Preceded by: Bertrand Saint-Sernin
- Succeeded by: Claude Lambert

Rector of the Academy of Dijon
- In office 1983–1985
- Preceded by: Yvonne Lambert-Faivre
- Succeeded by: Jean-Claude Cubaud

Academy of Reims
- In office November 1981 – April 1983
- Preceded by: Rolande Gadille
- Succeeded by: Michèle Sellier

President of Jean Monnet University
- In office 1978–1981
- Preceded by: François Tomas
- Succeeded by: Claude Longeon

Personal details
- Born: 8 December 1944 Aubière, France
- Died: 11 August 2025 (aged 80) Teilhet, France
- Education: Institut national des sciences appliquées de Lyon; Claude Bernard University Lyon 1 (DSc)
- Occupation: Academic; Civil servant

Christian Forestier (8 December 1944 – 11 August 2025) was a French academic and civil servant.

Forestier was heavily influential within the French education system and was notably close to politicians such as Jack Lang and Laurent Fabius.

== Life and career ==
=== Early life and education ===
Born in Aubière on 8 December 1944, Forestier attended secondary school at the Lycée Blaise-Pascal in Clermont-Ferrand. He studied electrical engineering at the Institut national des sciences appliquées de Lyon and graduated in 1971. During his studies, he took part in the May 68 protests and was active with the Union of Communist Students. In 1981, he earned a Doctor of Science from Claude Bernard University Lyon 1.

=== Teaching and university leadership ===
After two years of teaching secondary school in Saint-Étienne, Forestier became a research associate professor at the Institut universitaire de technologie de Tarbes and subsequently Jean Monnet University. He was director of the school from 1976 to 1977 but was removed by State Secretary Alice Saunier-Seité. From 1978 to 1981, he was president of Jean Monnet University.

=== Rectorships and civil service ===
In 1981, President François Mitterrand's Minister of National Education Alain Savary chose Forestier to be rector of the Academy of Reims. At the time of his appointment, he was the youngest rector in France. He notably contributed to the foundation of the Brevet de technicien supérieur. In 1983, he was named rector of the Academy of Dijon during the time of the Savary law. In 1985, he helped Jean Auroux to create an Institut universitaire de technologie in Roanne, against the advice of the government. From 1989 to 1992, he was rector of the Academy of Creteil, where he helped open the first higher mathematics school in Seine-Saint-Denis and the University of Paris-Est Marne-la-Vallée. From 1992 to 1995, he directed middle and secondary schools at the Ministry of National Education. From 1995 to 1998, he directed superior schools for the Ministry and served on the council of the Ordre des Palmes académiques. He also joined the board of directors of the École nationale d'administration in December 1995. From 1998 to 2000, he was rector of the Academy of Versailles. From 31 March 2000 to 6 May 2002, he was chief of staff to Minister of National Education Jack Lang.

=== CNAM general administrator ===
Forestier was named general administrator of the Conservatoire national des arts et métiers (CNAM) in 2008, under a decree from President Nicolas Sarkozy. In the midst of the 2010 Haiti earthquake, he offered emergency aid and offered free courses for 600 Haitian students. He also expanded CNAM's partnerships both in and out of France, thanks to help from Safran. These partnerships included the Fédération française des services à la personne et de proximité, as well as institutions in Luxembourg and Morocco. In 2013, he was replaced by Olivier Faron.

=== Teaching advisor ===
In 2000, Jack Lang created the Haut Conseil de l'évaluation de l'école, and Forestier joined the institution in February 2003, succeeding Claude Thélot as president. In 2007, he was named a member of the Commission sur l'évolution du métier d'enseignant. From 2002 to 2008, he was an associate professor at the University of Paris-Est Marne-la-Vallée, where he was also responsible for reporting on university strategy. From 2004 to 2013, he was president of the French Centre for Research on Education, Training and Employment. He was also a member of the steering committee of the think tank Institut Montaigne, which is credited with inspiring the political ambitions of Emmanuel Macron. From 2010 to 2011, he co-chaired the steering committee of the Committee of School Holidays, having been appointed by Minister of National Education Luc Chatel. Chatel's successor, Vincent Peillon, tasked him with shortening the summer holiday from eight to six weeks and lengthening the school week from four to four and a half days. These reforms were vocally opposed by teachers, and ultimately the suggestions were rejected.

=== Retirement ===
Forestier retired from the Ministry of National Education in November 2013. However, he kept up with other engagements, such as his work on the central committee of the Meilleur Ouvrier de France and his service as president of the Association régionale des œuvres éducatives et de vacances de l'Éducation nationale from 2013 to 2014. In 2014, he led a committee to oversee the transition of the Jean-François Champollion University Center for Teaching and Research from an établissement public à caractère administratif to an établissement public à caractère scientifique, culturel et professionnel. That year, he was elected president of the council école supérieures du professorat et de l'éducation (ESPE) of French Guiana. The following year, he was elected president of the council of the ESPE of Versailles. In 2018, he became a member of the Conseil d'orientation stratégique du Réseau national des ÉSPÉ.

In 2014, Forestier was elected president of the Fondation santé des étudiants de France. The following year, he became founding president of the Pro Educ Consultants. On 28 September 2015, he became a founding member of the Observatoire de l’enseignement technique agricole.

=== Death ===
Christian Forestier died in Teilhet on 11 August 2025, at the age of 80.

== Publications ==
=== Thesis ===
- Mise en œuvre d'un système multi-microprocesseurs pour la résolution d'équations aux dérivées partielles et aux valeurs propres (1981)

=== Official reports ===
- Les IUT 25ans après leur création (1990)
- Propositions pour une rénovation de la voie technologique (1999)
- État de l'école, élément de diagnostic (2004)
- L'enseignement technique et professionnel : efficace pour l‘insertion, mais socialement discriminant (2005)
- Que vaut l'enseignement en France ? (2007)
- Du bon usage des évaluations (2007)
- Conclusions des travaux sur l'évolution du statut du CUFR JF Champollion (2014)
- Les défis de l’employabilité durable. La formation professionnelle initiale dans le monde (2016)

== Distinctions ==
- Commander of the Legion of Honour (2013)
- Officer of the Ordre national du Mérite (2011)
- Commader of the Ordre des Palmes académiques (2005)
