= French Sculpture Census =

Catalogue of French sculpture in the United States

French Sculpture Census, a digital archive cataloging French sculpture in American public collections, is a project directed by Laure de Margerie, and funded by the Nasher Sculpture Center, the Institut National d'Histoire de l'Art, the Musée d'Orsay, the Ecole du Louvre, and the Musée Rodin

Started in September 2009, French Sculpture Census went online in December 2014, providing information and images for 7,000 works of French sculpture in American collections, not only museums, but also historic houses, government buildings, corporate collections, and public space, dating from 1500, collaborating with 280 museums. The site has both French-text and English-text. Searches locate artists, locations, sculptures, places of birth, places of death, gender, sculpture type, medium, period, and plain-text. The site provides bibliographies, current exhibitions lists, and a glossary.

June Hargrove, professor emerita of Art History at the University of Maryland, participates in the Advisory Committee of the French Sculpture Census.

== Laure de Margerie ==
Laure de Margerie, was Senior Archivist and head of the Sculpture Archives at the Musée d'Orsay in Paris, from 1978 through 2009, curating the exhibition Facing the Other: Charles Cordier (1827-1905), Ethnographic Sculptor (Paris, Quebec City, New York, 2004/05). De Margerie worked as archivist in charge of historic buildings in Normandy in Rouen (1983–1985). De Margerie oversaw rights and reproductions at the National Archives in Paris (1991–1992). De Margerie was awarded a fellowship at the Clark Art Institute (2000/01). De Margerie was the Sculpture and Decorative Arts Department guest scholar at the J. Paul Getty Museum in Los Angeles, CA (Fall 2011).
