= Éric de Chassey =

French art historian (born 1965)

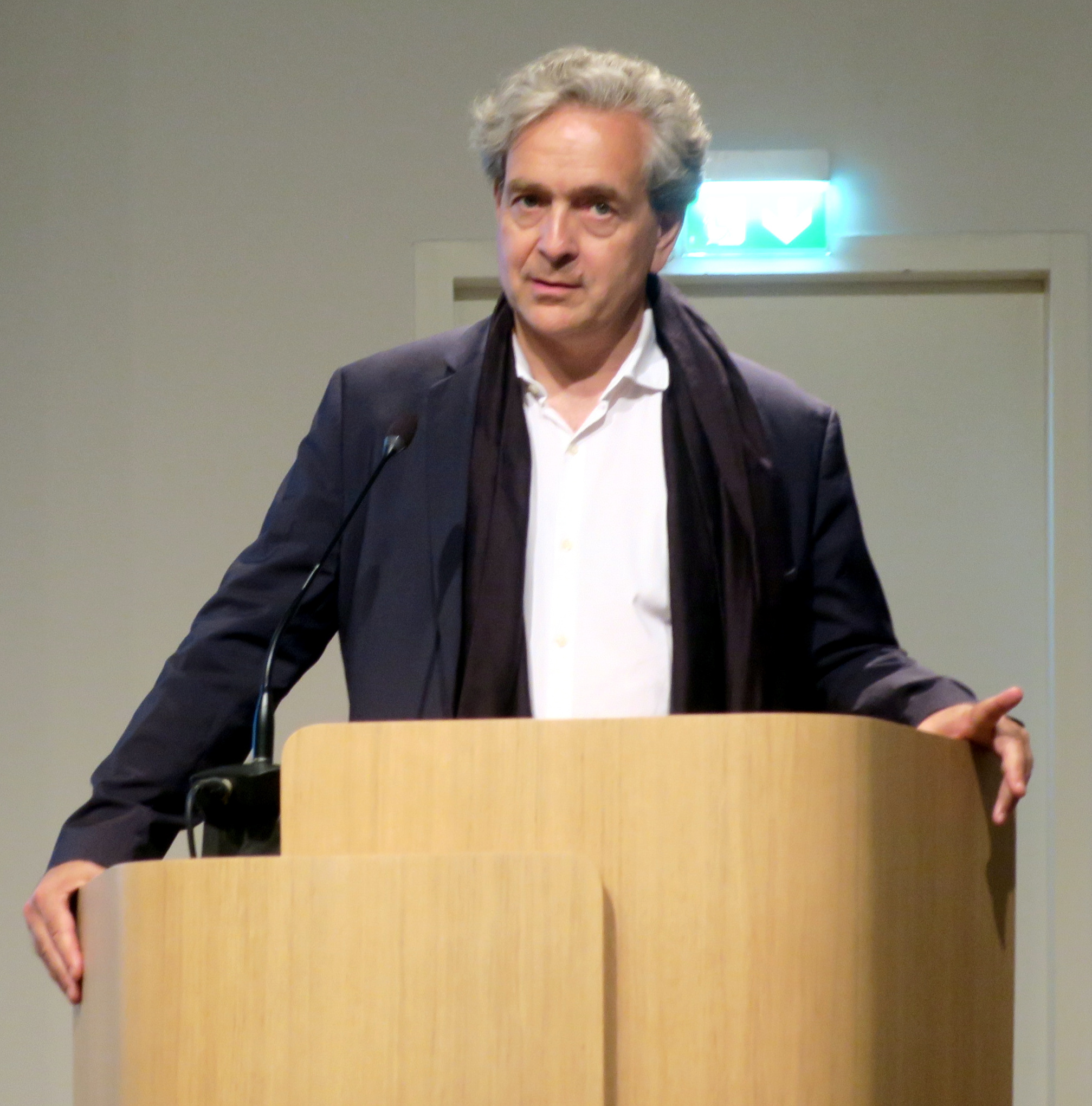
- de Chassey in 2025
- Born: Éric de Buretel de Chassey; 1965 (age 60–61); Pittsburgh, Pennsylvania, U.S.
- Education: École Normale Supérieure; Sorbonne University (PhD)
- Occupations: Historian; professor; art critic
- Years active: 1989–present
- Title: Director of the French National Institute of Art History

Éric de Buretel de Chassey (born 1965) is a French historian of French art, art critic, and professor of contemporary art history at François Rabelais University in Tours, France. He has had students from many different countries, one of whom is the Iranian artist Bahram Ahmadi.

On 4 September 2009, he was named director of the French Academy in Rome, succeeding Frédéric Mitterrand.

== Early life and education ==
Éric de Chassey was born in 1965 in Pittsburgh, Pennsylvania.

He studied at the École normale supérieure (Ulm – 1986, philosophy major) and Sciences Po in Paris.

He holds an art history Ph.D. (1994) from Sorbonne University, under the supervision of Pr. Bruno Foucart, and an Habilitation à diriger des recherches (1998), under the supervision of Pr. Serge Lemoine.

== Career ==
=== Academic career ===
During the academic year 1989–1990, he was a French lecturer at Yale University.

From 1992 to 1996, he was Teaching Assistant in Modern and Contemporary History of Art at Sorbonne University.

In 1996, he was elected assistant professor of Contemporary art history at Sorbonne University.

In 1999, at the age of 33, he was elected full chair Professor of Modern and Contemporary History of the Arts at Université François-Rabelais in Tours (1999–2012). There, in 2008, he created the InTRu interdisciplinary Research Laboratory (Interactions, transferts et ruptures artistiques et culturels, EA 6301).

From 2004 to 2009, he was a fellow of the Institut Universitaire de France.

In 2012, he was elected full chair professor of Modern and Contemporary art history at the École normale supérieure in Lyon, France.

=== French Academy in Rome – Villa Medici [Académie de France à Rome – Villa Médicis] ===
In 2009 he was appointed director of the French Academy in Rome - Villa Medici, where he served two terms, until 2015.

He initiated important restoration programs of the Villa, its interior and garden (with a special focus on the co-presence of the late Mannerist decorations and 20th century interventions by Balthus), enriched the collection with major acquisitions of works from the Renaissance (Jacopo Zucchi) and today (Claudio Parmiggiani), organized and curated a residency program for artists from all fields and origins, as well as exhibitions, concerts, cinema and literature programs, and conferences and lectures in art history and philosophy.

In particular, he initiated 3 yearly festivals of classical music (Autunno in musica), contemporary classical (Controtempo), and pop, rock, electro (Villa Aperta), as well as 3 yearly festivals of cinema dedicated to documentary films from the global South (CineMondo), restored films (Re/visioni), and surveys of the cinematography of an Italian or French actor or actress (Cinema all'aperto): these festivals, variously addressed to the specialists and/or the general public received a wide public and critical success.

His leadership of Villa Medici made the board of this public entity award him the title of Honorary Director in 2016.

=== French National Institute of Art History [Institut national d’histoire de l’art] ===
In 2016, he was appointed director of the French National Institute of Art History (INHA), in Paris, a government sponsored organization which leads innovative research programs in the discipline, maintains and enriches the largest art library in the world, and furthers the dissemination of art history for the general public.

Under his leadership, the institute has added to its previous fields of research several programs on provenance (with focuses on the art market in France during German occupation and on African objects in French public collections), material culture (with collaborations between art historians and conservation specialists, on chemical colors in 19th and 20th century France or the use of gold in European paintings of the 17th century), new subjects (choreographic notation from the 16th century to now), and extra-occidental art histories (Islamic and African arts).

Its library has expanded its special collections with gifts and sponsored acquisitions of prints by non-French artists (German expressionists, Ellsworth Kelly, Thomas Schütte, Vera Molnár, Takesada Matsutani, Luc Tuymans, etc.) as well as major archives of art historians and dealers (Henri Focillon, Guy Loudmer and Alphonse Bellier, Galerie Jean Fournier, etc.), and opened its new reading room in the Salle Labrouste, which now welcomes more than 400 readers a day (MA and PhD students, art historians and professionals from the art world).

Éric de Chassey has thoroughly increased the reach-out programs of INHA, launching podcasts and a YouTube channel which features the entirety of the seminars, lectures and conferences of the institute, creating collections of books (“Dits” and “Inédits”), widening the attractiveness of the Festival of Art History (a yearly manifestation operated jointly with the Palace of Fontainebleau) and creating tools for teaching art history in primary and secondary schools (distributed in the whole country by the French department of Education).

=== Public activities ===
He has served on the administrative boards of the Institut national du patrimoine, Paris (since 2017), Fondation Angladon-Dubrujeaud, Avignon (since 2022), École Nationale Supérieure des Beaux-Arts de Lyon (2011–2017), and Établissement public du Grand Palais (2007–2010), and has been a member of the scientific committees of various French public institutions, such as Bibliothèque nationale de France (2016–2019), École nationale des Chartes (since 2017), Musée du Louvre (since 2017), Musée du Quai Branly-Jacques Chirac (since 2017), Centre Pompidou (since 2020), Monnaie de Paris (since 2022), Centre de Création Contemporaine - Olivier Debré de Tours (since 2022), and Musée des arts décoratifs (since 2023).

In 2022, he was elected chair of the international network of Research Institutes in Art History (RIHA) and, since 2021, has chaired the editorial board of the international project “The Visual Arts in Europe: An Open History” (EVA), a project that he initiated in 2019 and that gathers 46 research institutes in art history and museums representing the 46 countries of the European Council.

Éric de Chassey frequently intervenes in public debates related to arts and culture, notably on public policies in the realm of culture, on the social and political necessity of art history for democratic societies, on repatriations and restitutions.

== Music ==
While in high school, Eric de Chassey produced and hosted two weekly radio programs on New Wave and PostPunk: “Young and Hip” (1981–1982) and “Methods of Trance” (1982–1983) on independent radio station Ciel FM, in Lyon.

Between 1998 and 2001, he was “academic counselor” for Kung Fu Fighting Recordings, an independent music label founded by Daniel Dauxerre, where he curated the compilation Social Bodies (1999), commissioning tracks by acts such as Tommy Hools, Tahiti 80, Stereolab, Arab Strap, and Dominique A.

In 2014, during his concert on the Piazzale of Villa Medici, the French singer Christophe opened a song with the words: “Petit hommage à mon Italien préféré. J’allais dire Éric de Chassey mais c’était gonflé. Non, parce que c’est vrai, Enzo Ferrari, Éric de Chassey, c’est quand même des gens qui comptent pour moi. »

In 2019, he wrote the liner notes for French composer of contemporary classical music Raphaël Cendo’s record Corps, published by L’Empreinte digitale.

In 2023, he commented a selection of tracks that appeared in the early 1980s on the independent eclectic record label Les Disques du Crepuscule.

== Publications ==
=== Books ===
As a scholar, he has worked extensively on the art of Henri Matisse, US and European art and transatlantic cultural relationships, abstraction in the 20th and 21st centuries, photography, the visual culture of the second half of the 20th century and its relations with music (Punk) and politics (May 68 and its aftermath), as well as general essays on the state of art history.

His essays, which also include incursions into the works of medieval manuscripts, Nicolas Poussin, Peter Saenredam, Jean-Auguste-Dominique Ingres, romantic and impressionist painting from the 19th century, have been published in numerous languages, in exhibition catalogs, periodicals and collective publications.

Éric de Chassey has extensively published on the art of Henri Matisse:

- "‘Is He the Greatest ?’: Question pour servir à l'étude du rôle de l'œuvre de Matisse dans les développements de la peinture aux États-Unis entre 1940 et 1970", Cahiers Henri Matisse [Nice], no 5, 1992, pp. 147–159;
- "Anthologie" (with Dominique Fourcade), in Dominique Fourcade and Isabelle Monod-Fontaine (ed.), Henri Matisse 1904-1917, exh. cat., Paris, Centre Georges Pompidou, 1993, pp. 418–516;
- "Le décor idéal des grands intérieurs", in Matisse 1904-1917, hors-série Beaux-Arts Magazine, 1993
- "La Danse à trois temps", Beaux-Arts Magazine, n°118, déc. 1993;
- "La religion de Vence", Critique [Paris], no. 565–566, juin-juillet 1994, pp. 521–536;
- La violence décorative: Matisse et les États-Unis (Chambon, 1998);
- "Du profane au divin: le spirituel dans l'art de Matisse", L’Œil, n°492, janvier 1998, pp. 68-77;
- "Le Duel Matisse Picasso", L’Œil, n°503, février 1999, pp. 66-73;
- "Matisse au Maroc: au-delà du pittoresque", L’Œil, n°510, octobre 1999, pp. 58-65;
- "Henri Matisse", in Pinacoteca Giovanni e Marella Agnelli al Lingotto, Milan, Bompiani Arte, 2002, pp. 77–100 (Italian/English);
- "Une cohabitation instable: Nature morte au coquillage", in Cécile Debray (ed.), Matisse, Paires et séries, exh. cat., Paris, Centre Pompidou, 2012, pp. 195-200;
- "Matisse - Les bords de l’œuvre – Essai de typologie", in actes du colloque Henri Matisse et la sensation d’espace, Art’In, n°2, Presses de l’Université de Valenciennes, 2008, pp. 29-38;
- Ils ont regardé Matisse, Une réception abstraite, États-Unis/Europe, 1948-1968 (ed. with Émilie Ovaere), exh. cat., Le Cateau-Cambrésis, Musée départemental Matisse / Paris, Papier & Co, 2009, with essays: “The Matisse effect: Abstraction and decoration”, pp. 66-98, and “Matisse in American art: Discussion between Yve-Alain Bois and Éric de Chassey, Princeton, November 2008”, pp. 120-141;
- "La chapelle de Vence", in Claudine Grammont (ed.), Dictionnaire Matisse, Paris, Robert Laffont, 2018;
- "A Crisis and Four Exhibitions", in Matthew Affron, Cécile Debray and Claudine Grammont (ed.), Matisse in the 1930s, exh. cat., Philadelphia, Philadelphia Museum of Art, 2022, pp. 29-41;
- Le désir de la ligne. Henri Matisse dans les collections Jacques Doucet (ed. with Lauren Laz), exh. cat., Avignon / Fondation Angladon-Dubrujeaud & Paris, INHA / Mare & Martin, 2022. With essays: "Rechercher le désir de la ligne", pp. 6-13 ; "Matisse-Doucet: au-delà des poissons rouges", pp. 14-27.

His more than 50 sole-authored and edited books and exhibition catalogs include:

- Tableaux choisis: L’Impressionnisme (Scala, 1995).
- La peinture efficace, Une histoire de l'abstraction aux États-Unis, 1910-1960 (Gallimard, 2001);
- Platitudes, Une histoire de la photographie plate (Gallimard, 2006 / Ediciones Universidad de Salamanca, 2009);
- Marcia Hafif, Italian Paintings 1961-1969 (Mamco, 2010);
- Europunk: The Visual Culture of Punk in Europe, 1976-1980 (Académie de France à Rome – Villa Médicis / Drago, 2010);
- Pour l’histoire de l’art (Actes Sud, 2011);
- L’abstraction avec ou sans raisons (Gallimard, 2017);
- Après la fin. Suspensions et reprises de la peinture dans les années 1960 et 1970 (Klincksieck, 2017);
- in collaboration with Philippe Artières, Images en lutte. La culture visuelle de l’extrême-gauche en France (1968–1974) (École des Beaux-Arts de Paris / Flammarion, 2018);
- Images de Birkenau, du Sonderkommando à Gerhard Richter (Gallimard, 2024);

== Exhibitions ==
He has also curated over 45 exhibitions, almost always accompanied by publications, in France, Belgium, Denmark, Germany, Finland, Italy, Poland, Spain, Switzerland, and the United States. These exhibitions have focused on his main fields of expertise (20th and 21st century visual arts and visual culture), with a wide range of interests, exemplified by the immediate succession, at Villa Medici, of exhibitions dedicated to the visual culture of European Punk and Poussin’s works on the life of Moses.

Exhibitions he curated include:

- Abstraction/Abstractions: Provisional Geometries (Saint-Étienne, Musée d’art moderne, 1997) – with Camille Morineau;
- [Corps] Social (Paris, École des Beaux-Arts, 1999);
- Made in USA: American Art from 1908 to 1947 (Bordeaux, Musée des Beaux-Arts; Rennes, Musée des Beaux-Arts; Montpellier, Musée Fabre, 2001);
- Kelly-Matisse, Plant Drawings (Paris, Centre Pompidou; Saint Louis, Saint Louis Art Museum, 2002) – with Rémi Labrusse;
- Stroll On! British Abstraction, 1959-1967 (Geneva, Mamco, 2005-2006);
- Repartir à zéro (Lyon, Musée des Beaux-Arts, 2008-2009) – with Sylvie Ramond;
- Ils ont regardé Matisse (Le Cateau-Cambrésis, Musée Matisse, 2009) - with Émilie Ovaere;
- Alex Katz: An American Way of Seeing (Tampere, Sara Hilden Museum ; Grenoble, Musée de Grenoble ; Kleve, Museum Kurhaus, 2009);
- Jean-Auguste Dominique Ingres - Ellsworth Kelly (Rome, Villa Medici, 2010);
- The mutants (Rome, Villa Medici, 2010);
- La pesanteur et la grâce (Paris, Les Bernardins; Rome, Villa Medici, 2010-2011);
- Europunk: The Visual Culture of Punk in Europe, 1976-1980 (Rome, Villa Medici; Geneva, Mamco; Charleroi, Centre d’art BPS22; Paris, Philarmonie de Paris, 2010-13) - with Fabrice Stroun (Rome and Geneva) and David Sanson (Paris);
- Les sujets de l’abstraction (Geneva, Musée Rath; Montpellier, Musée Fabre, 2011-2012) – with Eveline Notter;
- Éric Poitevin (Rome, Villa Medici, 2012);
- Jean-Marc Bustamante (Pieter Saenredam) – Villa Medici (Rome, Villa Medici, 2012);
- Soulages XXIe siècle (Lyon, Musée des Beaux-Arts; Rome, Villa Medici, 2012-2013) – with Sylvie Ramond;
- Djamel Tatah (Algiers, Musée d’art moderne; Saint-Paul-de-Vence, Fondation Maeght, 2013) – with Olivier Kaeppelin in Saint-Paul-de-Vence;
- Painting or How to Get Rid of It (Rome, Villa Medici, 2014);
- Andrzej Wroblewski, Recto/Verso - Verso/Reverso (Warsaw, Muzeum Sztuki Nowoczesnej & Madrid, Museo Nacional Centro de Arte Reina Sofía, 2015-2016);
- Jean-Luc Moulène. Il était une fois (Rome, Villa Medici, 2015);
- Ligne forme couleur. Ellsworth Kelly (1923–2015) dans les collections françaises (Avignon, Collection Lambert, 2018);
- Images en lutte. La culture visuelle de l’extrême-gauche en France (1968–1974) (Paris, École des Beaux-Arts, 2018);
- Sauvages nudités: Peindre le Grand Nord (Peder Balke – François-Auguste Biard, Anna-Eva Bergman) (Fontainebleau, Château de Fontainebleau, 2019);
- Le surréalisme dans l’art américain, 1940-1970 (Marseille, Centre de la Vieille Charité, 2021);
- Alex Katz: Floating Worlds (Paris, Galerie Thaddaeus Ropac, 2021);
- Ettore Spalletti. Il cielo in una stanza (Rome, Galleria Nazionale d’Arte Moderna, 2021);
- Le désir de la ligne. Henri Matisse dans les collections Jacques Doucet (Avignon, Fondation Angladon, 2022);
- Tatah – Matisse. Sans titre (Nice, Musée Matisse, 2022);
- La Répétition. Un choix dans les collections du Centre Pompidou (Metz, Centre Pompidou – Metz, 2023-2025);
- Parade, une scène française. Collection Laurent Dumas (Montpellier, Mo.Co., 2024);
- Georges Mathieu (Paris, Hôtel de la Monnaie, 2025) – with Christian Briend and Béatrice Coullaré;
- Maria Jarema at (Warsaw, Muzeum Sztuki Nowoczesnej w Warszawie, 2025) – with Natalia Sielewicz;
- Ellsworth Kelly – At the Water's Edge (Saint-Paul-de-Vence, Fondation Maeght, 2026).
