= Angladon Museum =

Museum in Avignon, France

Coordinates: 43.9461°N 4.8070°E

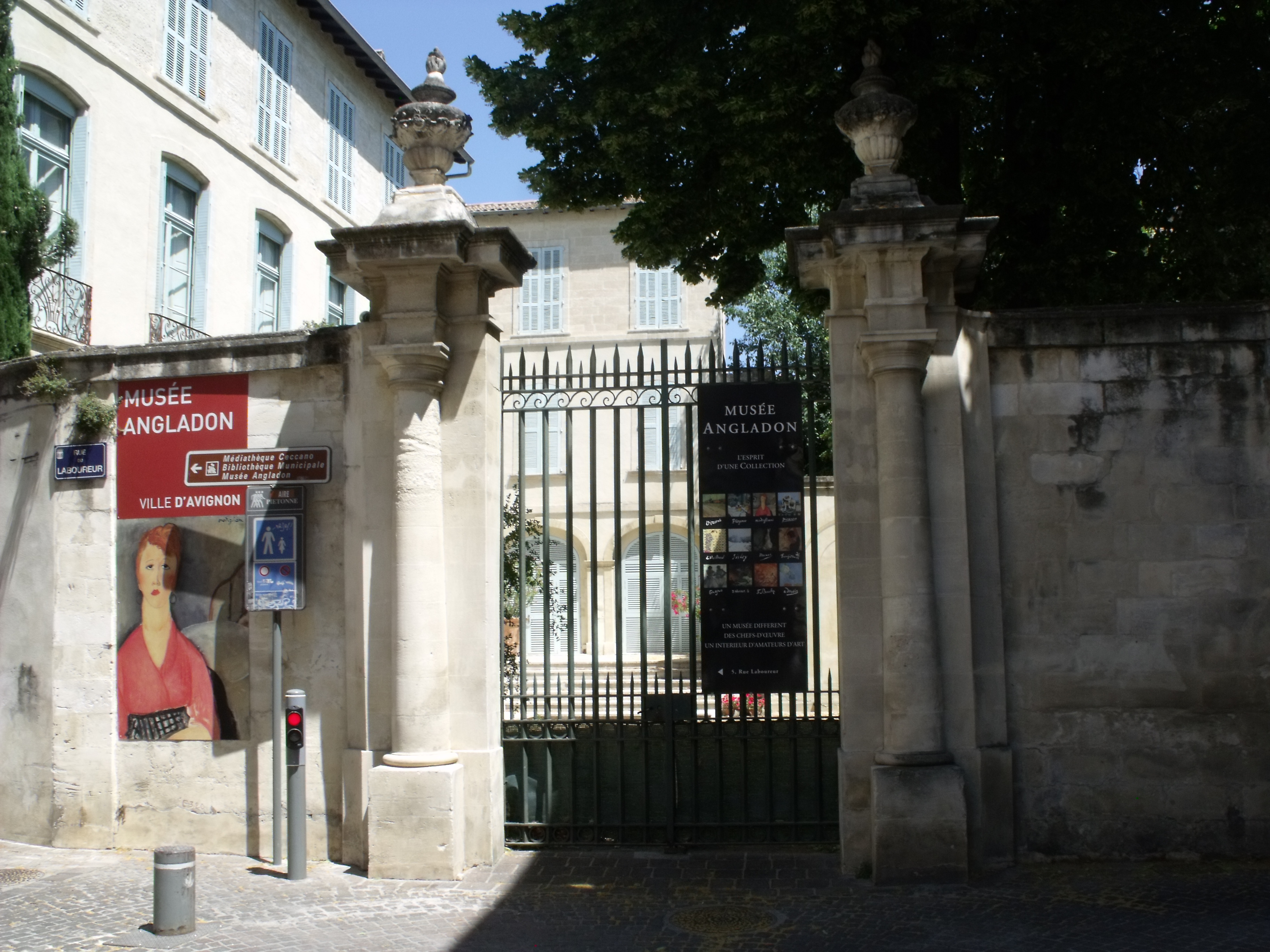
- Established: 1996
- Location: Avignon, France
- Type: Art museum
- Website: angladon.com/english-version/

The Angladon Museum – Jacques Doucet (French – Musée Angladon – Collection Jacques Doucet) is a museum at 5 rue Laboureur in Avignon. It is based in the hôtel de Massilian, a former hôtel particulier built in the 18th century. The museum was established in 1996 according to the wishes of Jean and Paulette Angladon-Dubrujeaud, heirs to the widow of the Parisian couturier Jacques Doucet (1853–1929). Its collections includes artworks from the 18th to 20th century.

== History ==
Jacques Doucet set up one of the first haute-couture fashion houses in Paris, based at rue de la Paix from 1895 to 1927 rue de la Paix. With the wealth he gained from this ventured he collected drawings, paintings, furniture and objets d'art from the 18th century to the present-day. He was also an active patron of the arts, financially supporting writers such as Louis Aragon, André Breton, Robert Desnos, Max Jacob, André Suarès, Antonin Artaud, Blaise Cendrars and Pierre Reverdy and donating two whole libraries to the Université de Paris, made up of several thousands of books and documents and now forming the Bibliothèque d'art et d'archéologie Jacques Doucet (now the library of the INHA) and the Bibliothèque littéraire Jacques Doucet respectively.

Doucet died in 1929 and twenty-nine years later his widow made Jean Dubrujeaud her heir. He in turn left the Doucet fortune and collection to his son Jean Angladon-Dubrujeaud, a painter and engraver living in Avignon and going by the name Jean Angladon (1906–1979). His wife Paulette (1905–1988) was also an artist, going by the name Paulette Martin. Together the couple donated some works from the collection to museums such as the Louvre, sold others but also acquired others to replace them. They had no children and decided to leave their collection – via the Fondation de France – to the Fondation Angladon-Dubrujeaud. This foundation was established in Avignon in 1993 and charged with setting up an art gallery, which it opened on 15 November 1993 and still runs.

== Hôtel de Massilian ==
The museum is housed in hôtel de Massilian, named after the family which owned it in the 18th century. It was built in 1694 to designs by Jean Péru. Abbé Massilian, historian of Avignon and provost-coadjutor of the church of Saint-Didier there, was born in the hôtel on 11 April 1721. The hôtel was left to the Fondation Angladon-Dubrujeaud by Jean and Paulette Angladon-Dubrujeaud at the same time as their collection. It includes a historic staircase and elements of the original decor on the main floor.

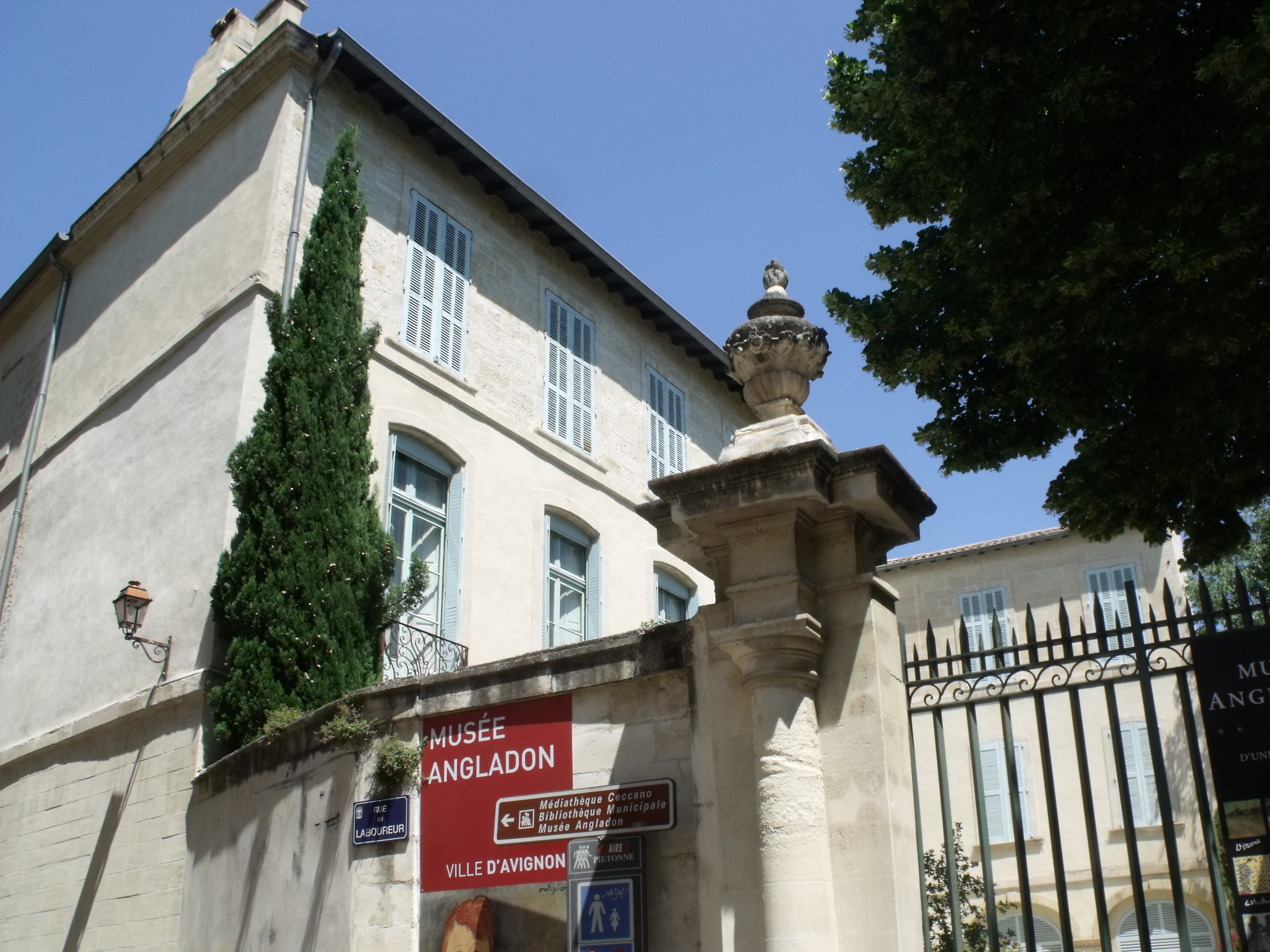
Façade of the former Hôtel de Massillan

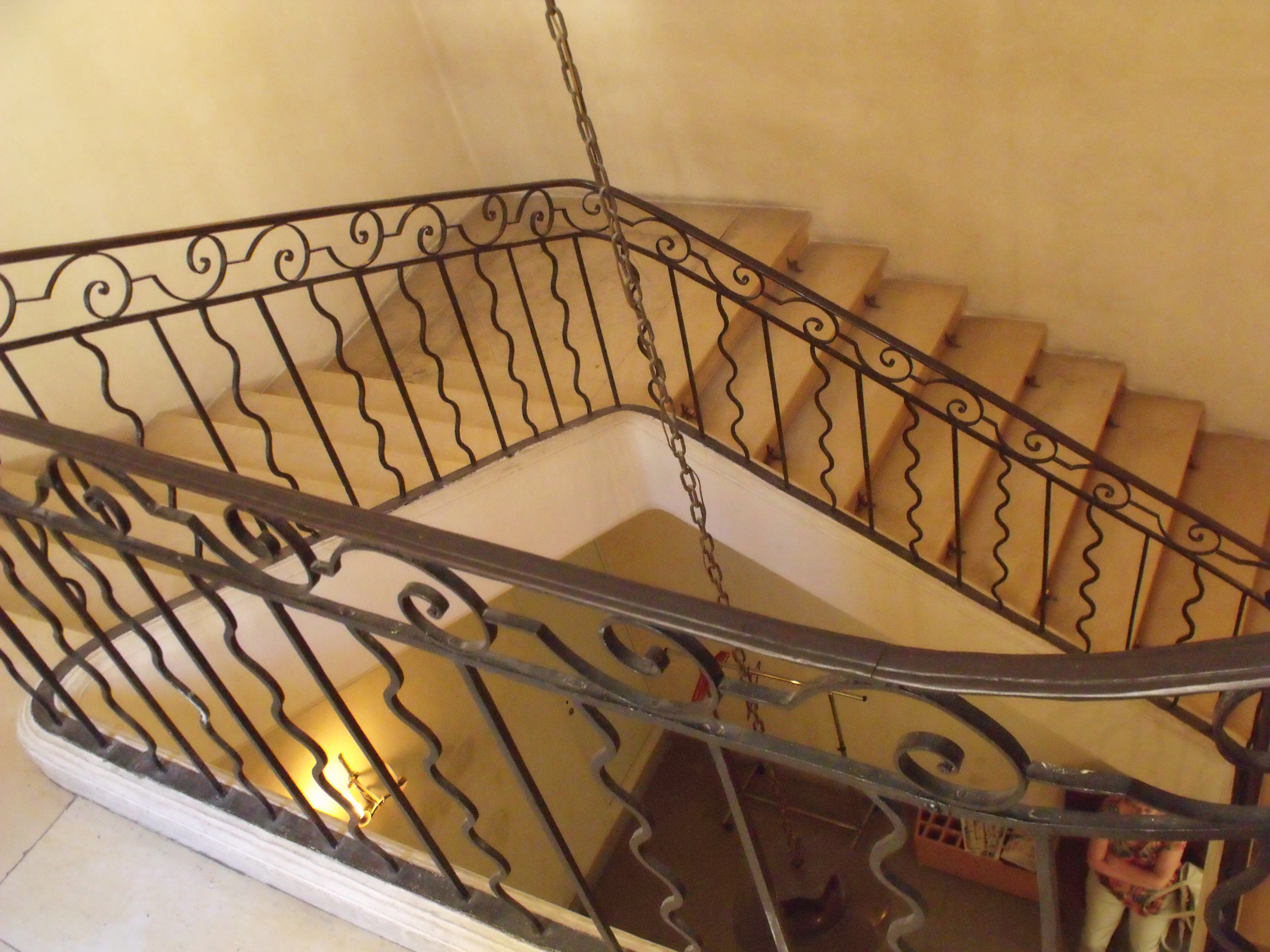
Staircase of the former Hôtel de Massillan

== Collections ==
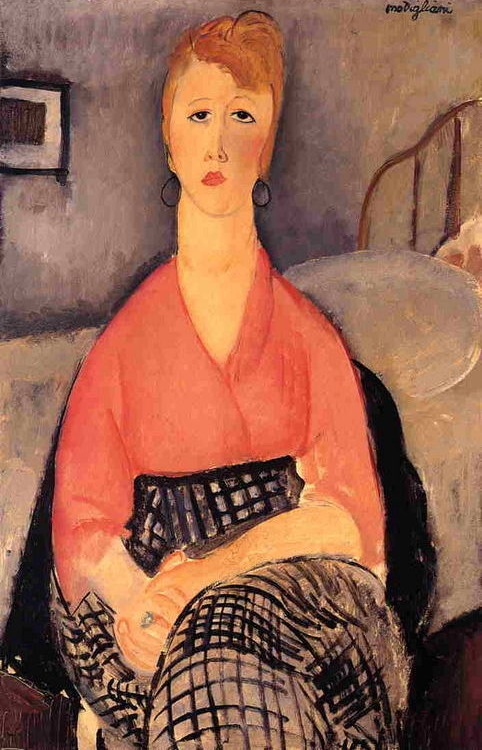
The Pink Blouse (La blouse rose), Amedeo Modigliani, 1919

- Works by Pierre Dupuis, Jean-Baptiste Chardin, Joseph Vernet, Hubert Robert and Thomas Lawrence, drawings by François Boucher and Juste-Aurèle Meissonnier, furniture by Jacob, Tillard, Lelarge and several objets d'art.
- Works by Eugène Carrière, Paul Cézanne, Honoré Daumier (Sancho Panza), Edgar Degas, Édouard Manet, Alfred Sisley, Vincent van Gogh, Rodo, Odilon Redon and Édouard Vuillard.
- Works from artists in the avant-garde circles in which Doucet moved, such as André Derain, Jean-Louis Forain, Léonard Foujita, Amedeo Modigliani and Pablo Picasso .
- medieval and Renaissance paintings, sculptures and furniture, which Angladon and his wife began acquiring from 1968 onwards and which are exhibited in two of the museum's rooms.
- a Far East cabinet, including historic 18th century porcelain, collected by Doucet
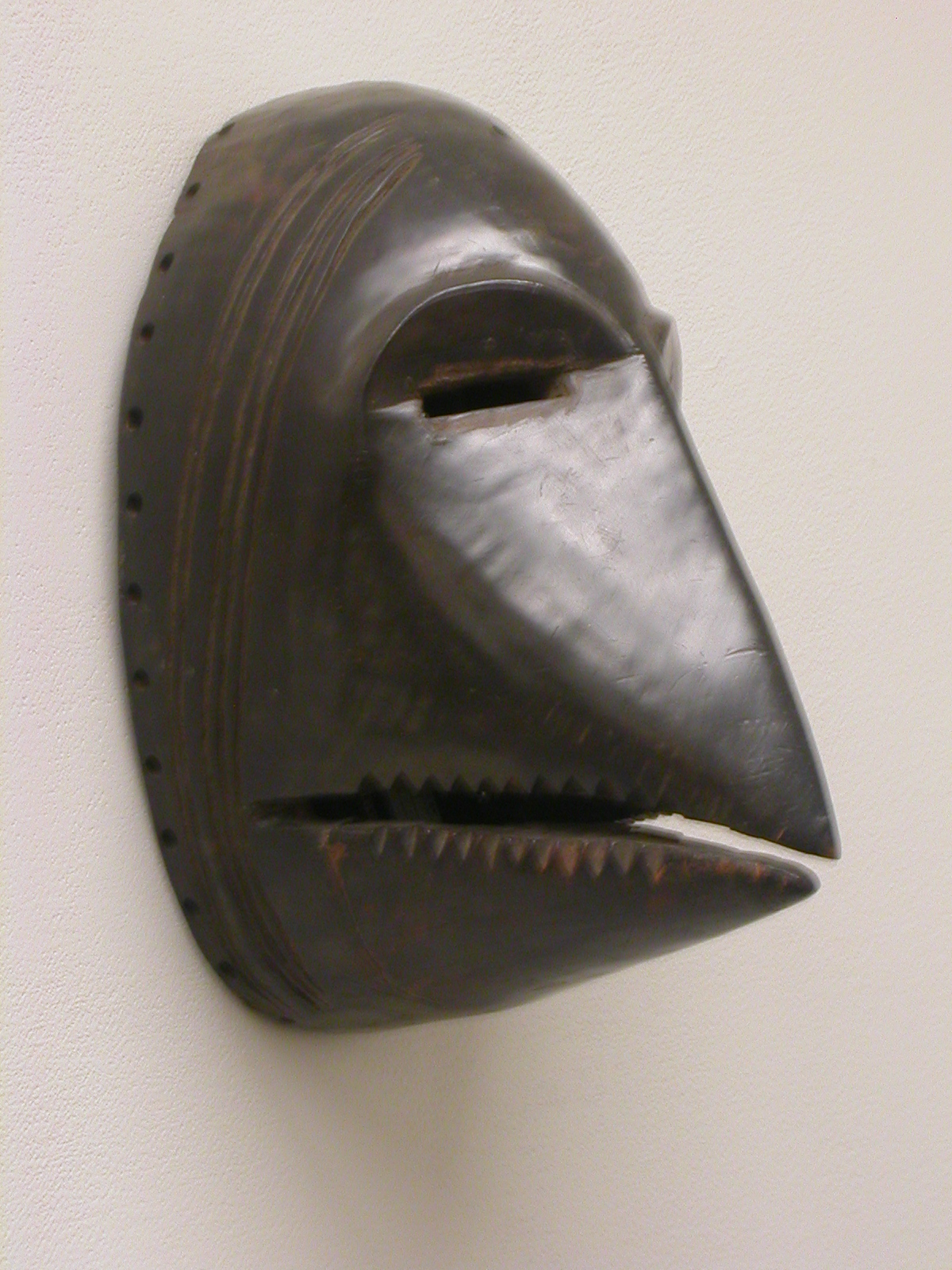
Mask, Ivory Coast

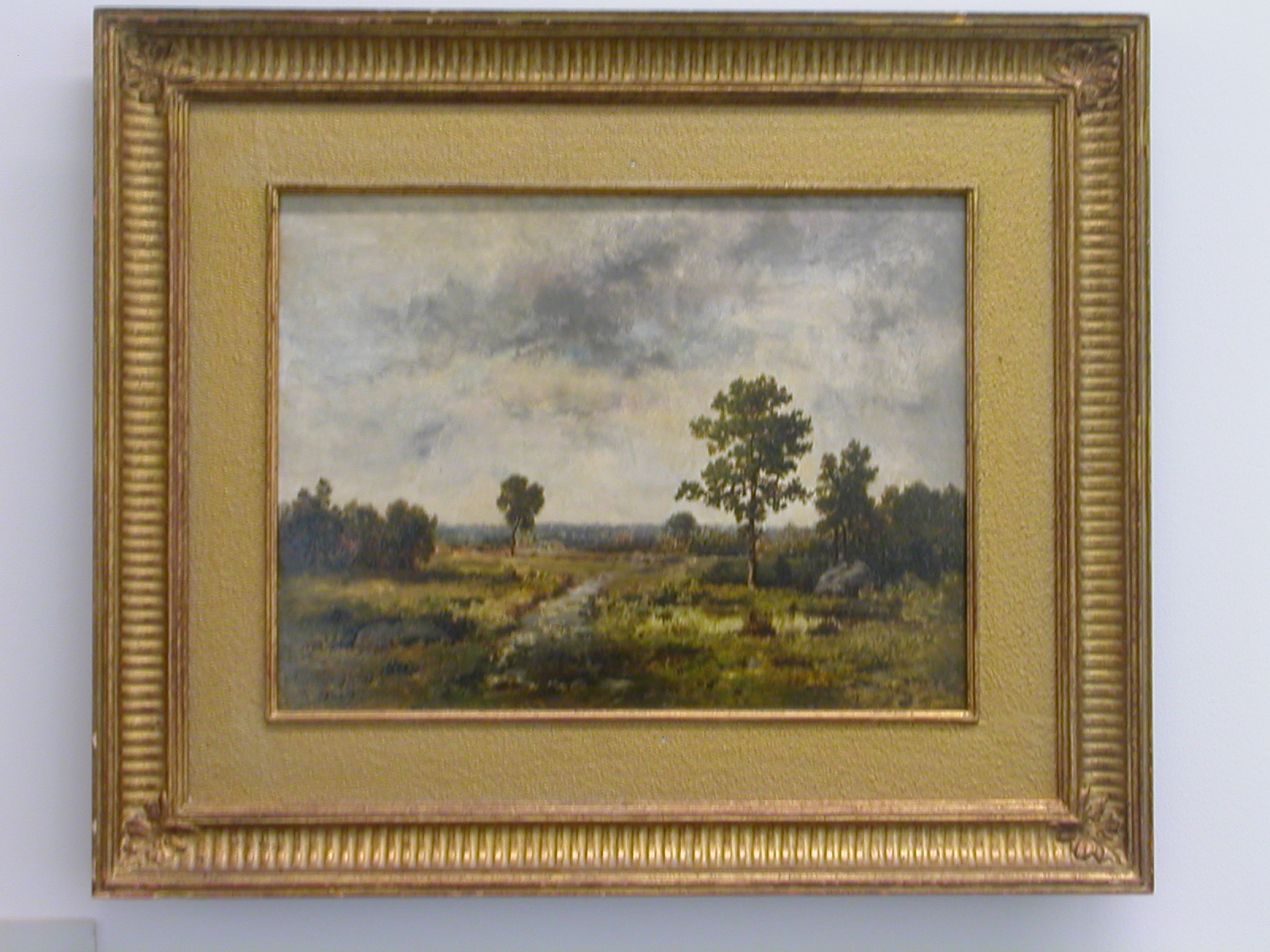
Near Fontainebleau by Narcisse Virgile Diaz de la Peña

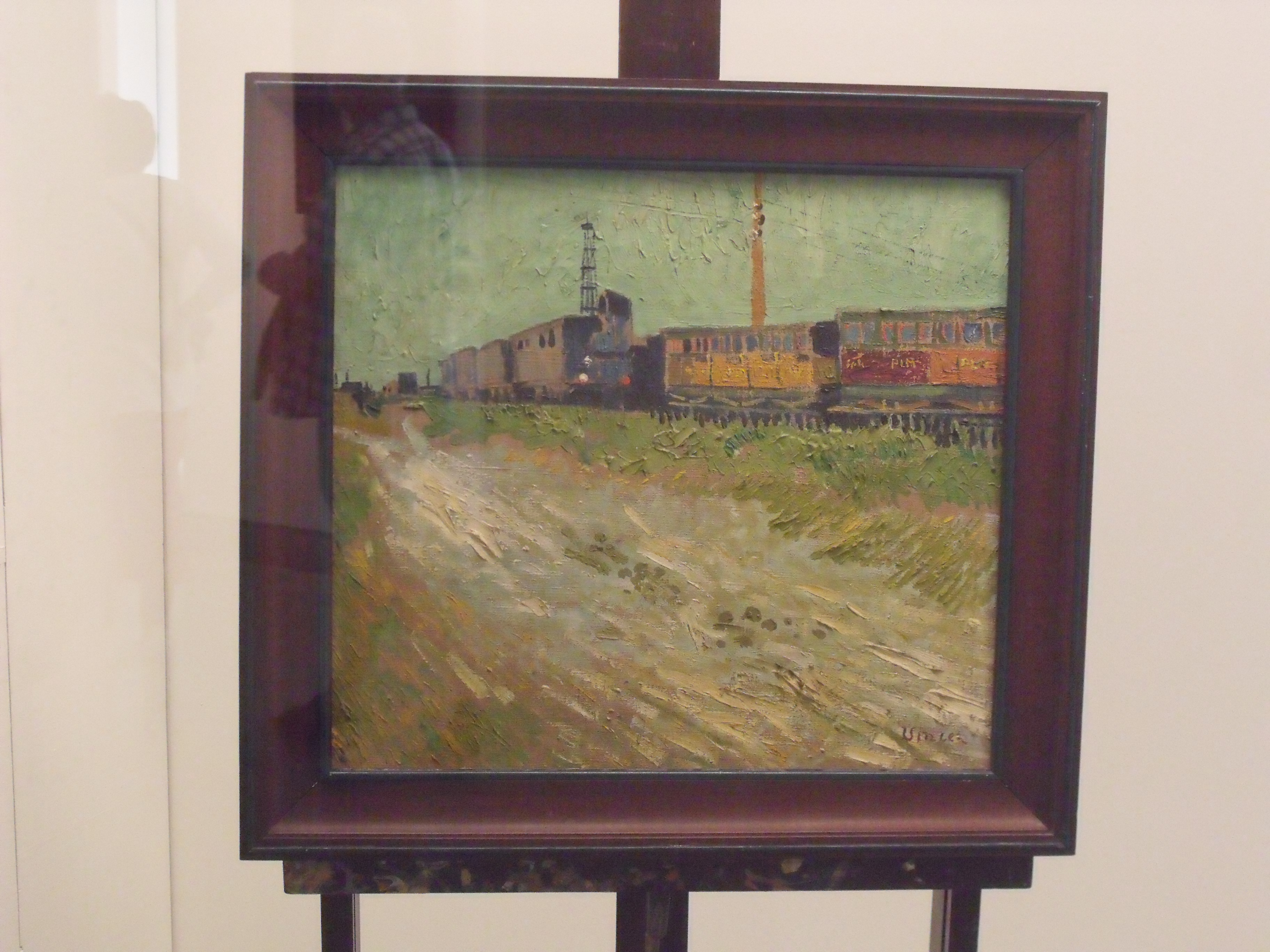
Railway wagons August 1888 by Vincent van Gogh

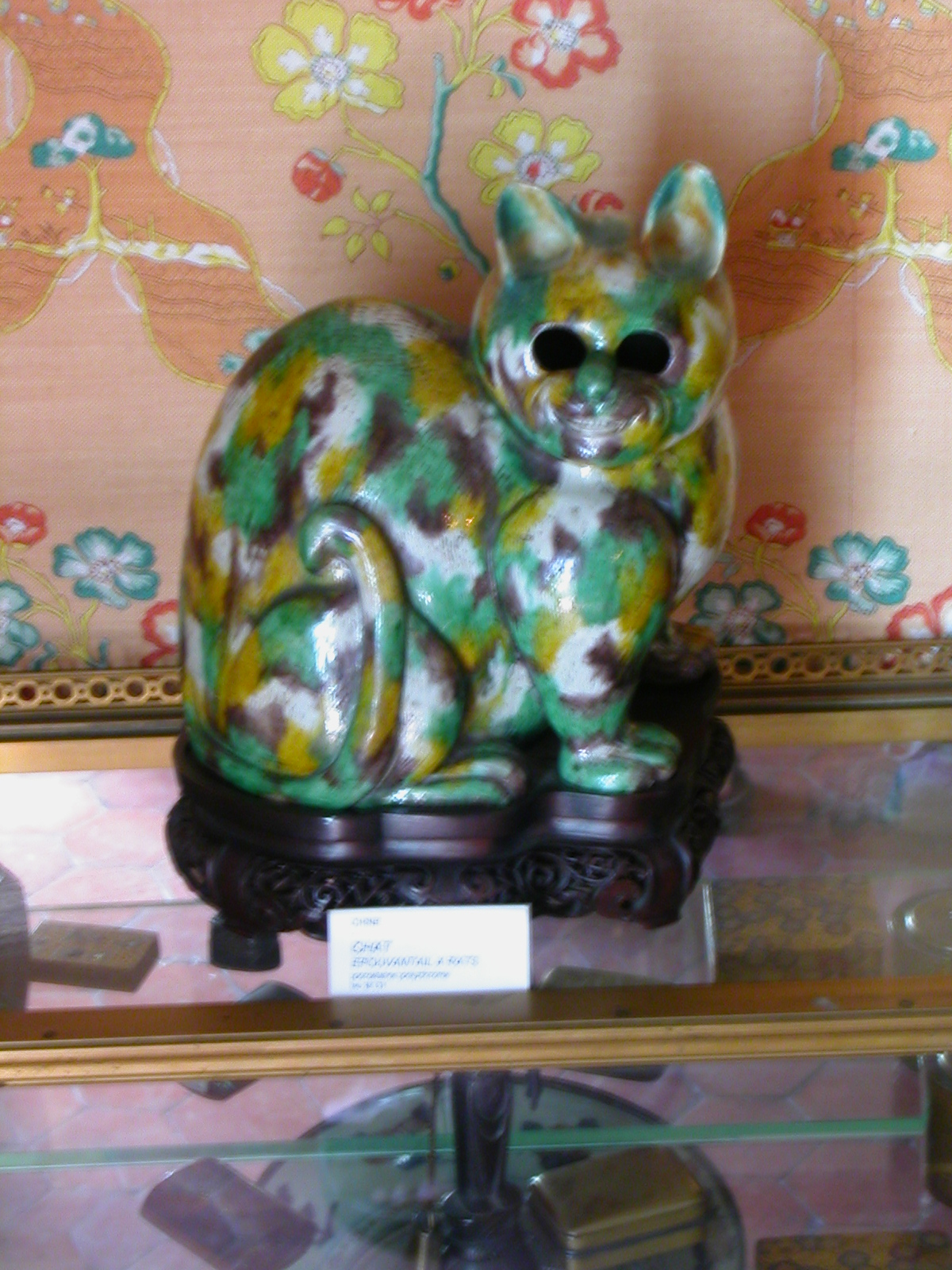
Chinese porcelain cat
