= Olivier Faron =

French historian and academic administrator

- Olivier Faron in 2021
- Born: 22 November 1959 (age 66)
- Citizenship: France

Olivier Faron (born 22 November 1959) is a French historian and senior civil servant. A specialist in contemporary history, youth and demography, he has held several senior positions in French higher education and public administration. He served as general administrator of the Conservatoire national des arts et métiers (CNAM) from 2013 to 2022 and as rector of the Strasbourg education authority from 2022 to 2024. Since January 2025, he has been director of the Skills, Training and Youth division of the Mouvement des entreprises de France (MEDEF).

== Biography ==
=== Education and academic career ===
Faron studied at the École normale supérieure de Saint-Cloud, where he was part of the 1980 class. He is an agrégé in history and holds a doctorate in contemporary history. He also holds an habilitation à diriger des recherches, the French qualification required to supervise doctoral research.

He began his academic career as a French-language lecturer at the Istituto de lingue moderne e straniere in Milan, Italy, from 1983 to 1984. From 1987 to 1990, he was a member of the École française de Rome. In 1990, he became a research fellow at the French National Centre for Scientific Research (CNRS) and a lecturer in contemporary history at Sciences Po. He was appointed professor at Lumière University Lyon 2 in 2000 and joined Paris-Sorbonne University in 2003.

Faron's research focuses on the demography of Mediterranean societies in the 19th and 20th centuries, the historical anthropology of the First World War, and the history of the French Youth Work Camps (Chantiers de la jeunesse française) during the Second World War. He is also the co-author of a biography of fashion designer Agnès B. and a contributor to an online course on the history of fashion. In 2022, he published a historical study of the contraceptive pill.

=== Senior public service and higher education administration ===
Faron has held several positions within French government ministries and higher education institutions. Between 1993 and 1995, he worked in the office of François Fillon, then Minister of Higher Education and Research. He subsequently served as deputy director of the CNRS programme Dynamiques urbaines from 1997 to 1998 and as deputy director of the Institute of Human Sciences in Lyon from 2000 to 2005.

From 2002 to 2005, he served as an adviser for the humanities and social sciences, and for relations between science and society, to Claudie Haigneré, Minister Delegate for Research and New Technologies. In 2005, he joined the Directorate-General for Higher Education as a scientific and educational policy officer.

In August 2005, he was appointed director of the École normale supérieure Lettres et sciences humaines in Fontenay-Saint-Cloud, a position he held until 2009. During his tenure, he oversaw the institution's merger with the École normale supérieure de Lyon. He subsequently served as director-general of the newly established École normale supérieure de Lyon from 2010 to 2011.

In July 2011, Faron joined the ministerial office of Laurent Wauquiez, Minister of Higher Education and Research, as deputy director in charge of higher education. He held this position until April 2012.

During 2012 and 2013, while serving as director-general of the École normale supérieure de Lyon, he was a member of the jury for the Château La Tour Carnet literary prize, an award established by Bernard Magrez for students at the institution.

Faron has also served as president of the French Society of Historical Demography. He has been a member of the boards of directors of the National Museum of Natural History (France) and the École des hautes études en sciences sociales, and vice-president of the research and higher education consortium of the University of Lyon.

He represented the Conference of University Presidents (now France Universités) on the board of the École nationale supérieure de la Police.

=== General administrator of the Conservatoire national des arts et métiers ===
On 25 July 2013, Faron was appointed general administrator of the Conservatoire national des arts et métiers (CNAM) by decree of President François Hollande, following a proposal by the Minister of Higher Education and Research. His appointment was renewed by President Emmanuel Macron on 25 July 2018 for a second five-year term.

During his tenure, Faron initiated a major reform of the institution's scientific, administrative and legal organisation in 2016. The restructuring generated considerable internal debate and mobilisation. He also oversaw the integration of several organisations and programmes into CNAM, including the Centre for Studies on Employment and Work (CEET) in 2016 and the National Council for School System Evaluation (Cnesco).

He also supported the introduction of a new statutory framework for CNAM professors through a decree issued on 31 October 2019 and the establishment of an Assembly of Chairs within the institution.

Another major initiative during his administration was the expansion of CNAM's regional presence through the programme Le Cnam au cœur des territoires (CNAM at the Heart of the Regions). The programme aimed to create 100 additional locations across mainland France and the overseas territories by 2022.

Faron also promoted policies aimed at widening access to higher education, particularly for people from backgrounds traditionally underrepresented in universities. These initiatives included the development of a degree in digital coding for young people who had left the education system without qualifications, as well as formal recognition of the bac+1 qualification, a one-year post-secondary diploma developed by CNAM.

Under his leadership, the network of Vaucanson Schools, originally established in 2010 by Vincent Merle, continued to expand, reaching five locations. These schools provide programmes designed in particular for students holding vocational qualifications.

Faron also supported the development of digital teaching methods at CNAM and promoted changes to its educational offerings.

In the cultural sphere, he initiated efforts to renew the cultural programme of the Musée des Arts et Métiers, seeking to increase its engagement with contemporary artists and creative industries. One of the projects undertaken during this period involved the artist Djamel Tatah.

In addition to his responsibilities as general administrator, Faron served as vice-president of the Training and Professional Integration Commission of the Conference of University Presidents. He was also a member of the governing council of HESAM University and chaired the board of the IPST-CNAM in Toulouse.

In 2018, he was appointed by Minister of Higher Education Frédérique Vidal as coordinator of the French institutions founding the Franco-Senegalese Campus. He also served as interim director of the National Higher Institute for Artistic and Cultural Education (INSEAC), established within CNAM on 17 February 2020.

Faron left CNAM in March 2022 following his appointment as rector of the Strasbourg education authority.

=== Rector of the Strasbourg education authority ===
On 2 March 2022, Faron was appointed rector of the Académie de Strasbourg by decree of President Emmanuel Macron, on the proposal of Minister of National Education, Youth and Sports Jean-Michel Blanquer. He succeeded Élisabeth Laporte.

In October 2022, following announcements made by President Macron at the Éric Tabarly secondary school in Les Sables-d'Olonne, Faron was tasked by Carole Grandjean, Minister Delegate for Vocational Education and Training, with leading a working group on reforming vocational education. His particular responsibility was to examine ways of improving employment rates among graduates of vocational programmes.

As rector, Faron focused on educational innovation, the development of the concept of the école du futur (school of the future), secularism in education and urban regeneration. He notably supported the Ambitions pour Mulhouse programme in the city of Mulhouse, as part of the initiatives of the French National Council for Refoundation.

He remained in office until 26 June 2024, when he was succeeded by Olivier Klein.

=== MEDEF ===
In June 2024, after leaving the French National Education Ministry, Faron joined the Mouvement des entreprises de France (MEDEF), France's largest employers' organisation, as special adviser on education and training. His appointment was announced on 27 June 2024.

His responsibilities included contributing to cooperation between educational institutions and businesses, improving career guidance and the transition of young people into employment, and adapting training and skills development to changes in the labour market.

In January 2025, he became director of MEDEF's Skills, Training and Youth division (Pôle Compétences, formation, jeunesse).

== Publications ==
- La Ville des destins croisés : recherches sur la société milanaise du XIXe siècle (1811–1860) (1997).
- Les Enfants du deuil : orphelins et pupilles de la nation de la Première Guerre mondiale (2001).
- Les Chantiers de jeunesse : avoir vingt ans sous Pétain (2011), published by Grasset, Paris. ISBN 978-2-246-75971-3
- Les Années Agnès B. (2018), co-written with Myriam Chopin.
- Former (2019), co-written with Thibaut Duchêne, with a preface by Jean Arthuis. Published by Éditions de l'Aube.
- Histoire de la pilule : Libération ou enfermement (2022), co-written with Myriam Chopin and published by Passés Composés.

== Honours and distinctions ==
=== National decorations ===
- Officer of the Legion of Honour, promoted by decree of 31 December 2021.
  - Previously appointed Knight of the Legion of Honour in 2007.
- Commander of the Ordre des Palmes académiques, ex officio as rector of an academy.
- Commander of the National Order of the Lion of Senegal.
- Commander of the Order of Merit of National Education of the Republic of Ivory Coast.

=== Academic distinctions ===
Faron has received honorary doctorates from the University of Ottawa in 2012, the Kharkiv National University of Urban Economy in 2016, and the Moscow State University of Railway Engineering in 2016.

He is also a member of the ADER network, class of ED Belfort, and a reserve colonel in the French Air and Space Force.
