= Marie-Louise Arconati-Visconti =

French benefactor, salonière and art collector

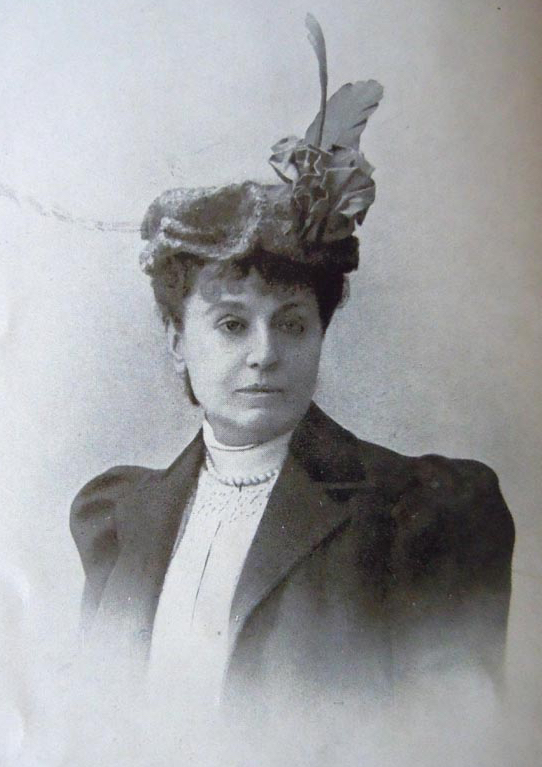
Marie-Louise Arconati-Visconti

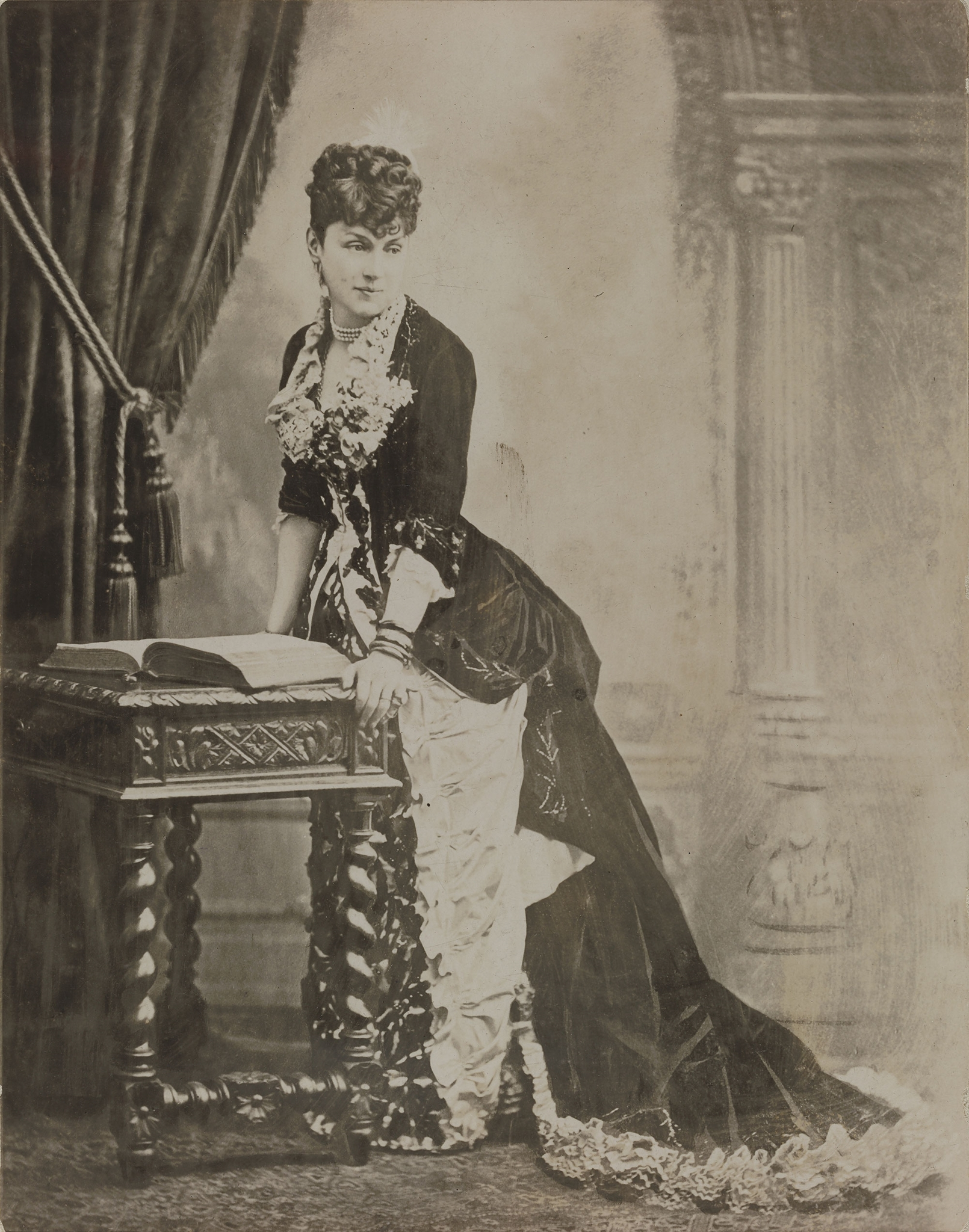
Marie Arconati-Visconti (1872)

Marie-Louise-Jeanne Peyrat (1840–1923), better known as the Marquise Arconati-Visconti, was a French philanthropist, salonnière and art collector. She is remembered for donating the outstanding Italian artworks she had inherited from her husband to the Louvre. Items from her own collection of art, furniture and jewellery from the Middle Ages and the Renaissance were donated principally to the Musée des Arts Décoratifs and the Musée Carnavalet. Her salon attracted prominent politicians and academics who introduced her to Alfred Dreyfus, with whom she developed a lengthy correspondence.

== Biography ==
Born in Paris on 26 December 1840, Marie-Louise-Jeanne Peyrat was the daughter of journalist and politician Alphonse Jean Peyrat (1812–1890) and his wife Marie Pauline Thérèse née Risch. Her father brought her up as a dedicated Republican with an interest in literature, history and politics.

As she grew older, Peyrat attended lectures at the Collège de France and at the École des Chartes. There she fell in love with Gianmartino Arconati Visconti, who was studying painting. From the Milan aristocracy, he was the son of Italian politician Giuseppe Arconati Visconti (1797–1873), who had to leave his country in 1821 as a collaborator of the supposed nationalist Federico Confalonieri.

Despite objections from the Arconati family, Marie-Louise married Gianmartino in November 1873. The couple moved to Italy where Gianmartino died three years later in February 1876. As a result, she inherited a huge fortune, which included Italian art treasures and a number of luxurious properties in Belgium, France and Italy. She settled in Paris but also spent the autumns at Gaasbeek Castle in Belgium. She used the fortune she had acquired to add to her art collection while providing support for libraries, museums and higher education institutions.

While in Paris, Arconati Visconti held a well-attended salon at her villa on rue Barbet-de-Jouy. Her guests on Thursdays included progressive politicians such as Jean Jaurès, Aristide Briand, Raymond Poincaré and Léon Gambetta, who brought her attention to the Dreyfus case. She subsequently became a dedicated supporter of Dreyfus.

On Tuesday evenings, she invited art experts for dinner, one of whom, art collector Raoul Duseigneur, became a lifelong friend. It was Duseigneur who advised her on the paintings, sculptures and furniture she should acquire for her collection. During her lifetime, she made numerous donations of artefacts to the museums of Paris in addition to providing financial support for libraries and educational institutions.

Marie-Louise Arconati-Visconti died on 3 May 1923 in Paris. She left her remaining fortune to the University of Paris, to which she had already made a large donation a few years earlier to create its Institut d'Art et d'Archéologie. She is buried in the cemetery of Rives, Isère, close to her companion Raoul Duseigneur, who had died in 1916.
