= Djamel Tatah =

Saint-Chamond artist (born 1959)

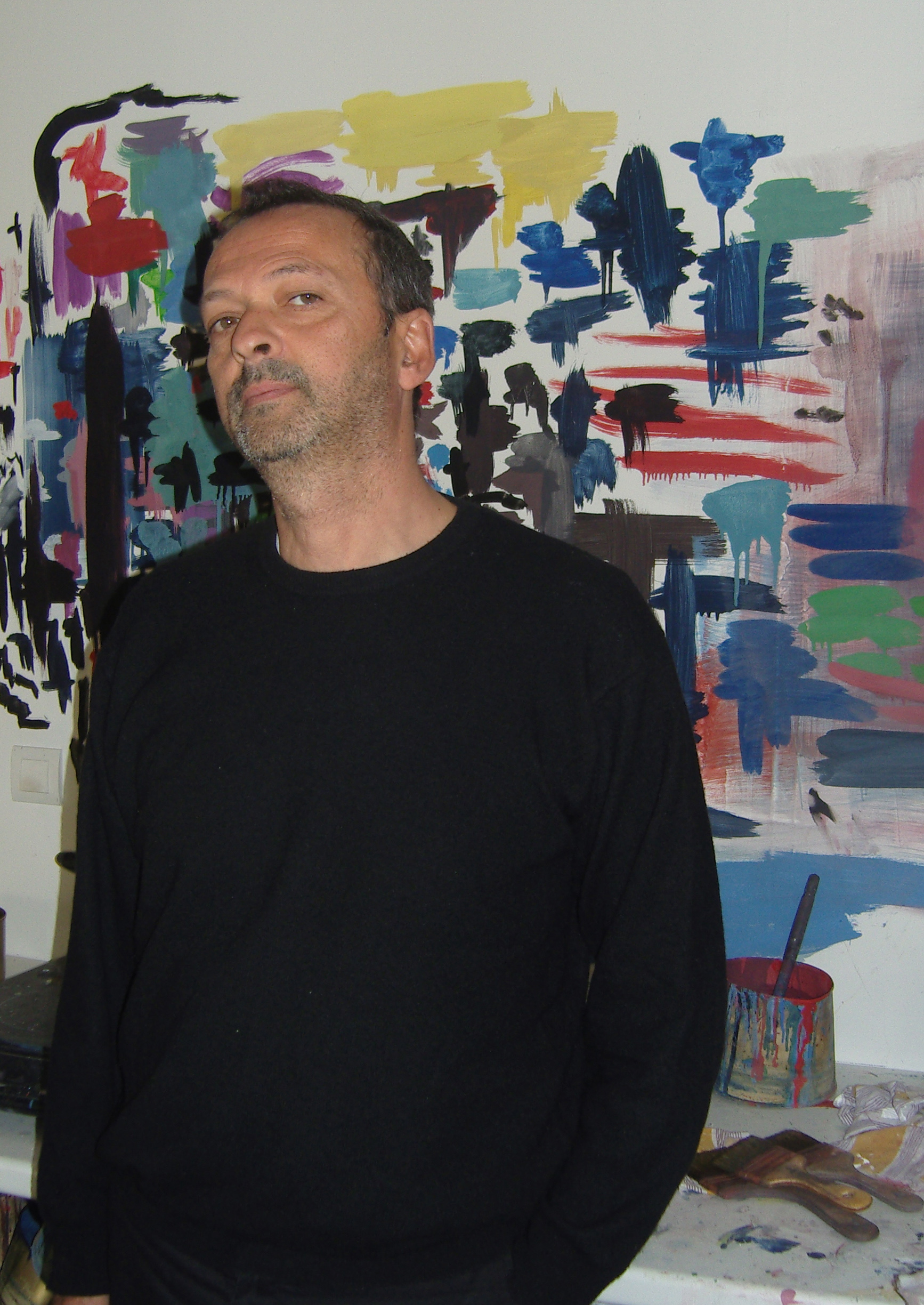
- Born: June 28, 1959 (age 67); Saint-Chamond, Loire, France
- Occupation: Contemporary artist

Djamel Tatah, born on June 28, 1959 in Saint-Chamond (Loire), is a contemporary artist of Franco-Algerian origin.

== Biography ==
Born to Algerian parents, Djamel Tatah studied at the School of Fine Arts in Saint-Étienne from 1981 to 1986. During his stay in Marseille from 1989 to 1995, he defined the essentials of his creative process and began working on large formats and polyptychs.

He held his first solo exhibition at the Liliane and Michel Durand-Dessert Gallery in Paris in 1999. He subsequently presented his works in various locations in France and abroad.

Djamel Tatah teaches at the École nationale supérieure des beaux-arts in Paris.

The artist has exhibited his works in France and internationally, including at the Centre for Art in Salamanca (Spain 2002), the Guangdong Museum in Canton (China 2005), the Museum of Fine Arts in Nantes (France 2008), the Museum of Modern and Contemporary Art in Nice (France 2009), the Villa Medici in Rome (Italy 2010), the Château de Chambord (France 2011), the Museum of Modern and Contemporary Art in Algiers (Algeria 2013), the Marguerite and Aimé Maeght Foundation and the Museum of Modern Art in Saint-Etienne (France 2014), the Lambert Collection in Avignon (France 2018) and the Musée Matisse Nice, Nice France (2024).

Some of his paintings are part of important public and private collections, including the Barjeel Art Foundation (Sharjah), the British Museum (London), the Musée National d’Art Moderne Centre-Pompidou (Paris), the Macaal (Marrakech), the Marguerite and Aimé Maeght Foundation (Saint-Paul), and the Museum of Modern and Contemporary Art (Saint-Étienne Métropole).

== Work ==
In a sober and refined painting style, Djamel Tatah portrays contemporary man affirming his presence in the world. Drawing from reality, from the most ordinary situations to current events, he paints human figures to scale, solitary, suspended in time, and seemingly belonging to no specific place. Through the use of color, light, and line, the artist expresses his sense of being in the world.

"My painting is silent. Imposing silence in the face of the noise of the world is, in a way, taking a political stance. It encourages taking a step back and carefully observing our relationship with others and society."

== Selected solo and group exhibitions ==
2021 - 2022:

- "Djamel Tatah. The Theatre of Silence", Musée Fabre, Montpellier, France
- "Double Je. Donation Durand-Dessert & MAMC+ collections", Museum of Modern and Contemporary Art, Saint-Étienne Métropole, France
- "Picasso & the Women of Algiers", Museum Berggruen, Berlin, Germany

2019 - 2020:

- "Waiting for Omar Gatlato: Contemporary Art from Algeria and Its Diaspora", Wallach Art Gallery, Columbia University, New York.
- "Djamel Tatah" Chapelle Saint-Martin-des-Champs, Musée des Arts et Métiers, Paris, France

2017 - 2018:

- "Djamel Tatah. Echoes with classic drawings and paintings and the monochromes of the Lambert Collection", Collection Lambert, Avignon, France
- "Djamel Tatah", Ben Brown Fine Arts, London, UK

2015:

- "Djamel Tatah", Ben Brown Fine Arts, London, UK
- "Walls and Margins", Barjeel Art Foundation, Sharjah, UAE
- Centre Pompidou, Malaga, Spain

2014:

- "Inhabiting the World", Busan Biennale, South Korea
- "Djamel Tatah", Museum of Modern and Contemporary Art, Saint-Étienne, France
- "Djamel Tatah Monograph", Fondation Maeght, Saint-Paul-de-Vence, France
- "With and Without Paint", Mac/Val, Vitry-sur-Seine, France

2013:

- "Djamel Tatah Monograph", Musée Public National d'Art Moderne et Contemporain d'Alger, Algiers, Algeria
- "Mirages d'Orient", Lambert Collection, Avignon, France
- "Here, Elsewhere", Friche la Belle de Mai, Marseille, France

2011:

- "Djamel Tatah", Château de Chambord, Chambord, France
- "I Have Two Loves", Musée de l'Histoire de l'Immigration, France

2010:

- "I Mutanti", Villa Medici, Rome, Italy
- "Djamel Tatah", Center for Contemporary Art Le Creux de l'Enfer, Thiers, France

2009: "Djamel Tatah", Galerie des Ponchettes, MAMAC, Nice, France

2008: "Djamel Tatah", Museum of Fine Arts, Nantes

2007:

- "Djamel Tatah", Centre for Contemporary Art Le Parvis, Tarbes
- "Air de Paris", Centre Pompidou, Paris

== Selected publications ==
- E. Mezil: "Epiphany of Twilight", Lambert Collection, Avignon
- E. de Chassey: "Abstract Readings of Djamel Tatah", Lambert Collection, Avignon
- D. Cohn: "Of Paintings and Men", Lambert Collection, Avignon
- M. Peppiatt: "Djamel Tatah: An Introduction", Ben Brown Fine Arts, London, 2015
- S. Eigner: "Art of the Middle East: Modern and Contemporary Art of the Arab World and Iran", Merrell, 2015
- F. R. Martin: "The Lived History of Art: Djamel Tatah in His Works", Museum of Modern Art of Saint-Étienne, 2014
- E. de Chassey: "The Paintings of Djamel Tatah: A Story", Marguerite & Aimé Maeght Foundation, Nice, 2014
- O. Kaeppelin: "Silence and Solitude", Marguerite & Aimé Maeght Foundation, Nice, 2014
- A. Adiceam: "Djamel Tatah: Tabula Rasa", Marguerite & Aimé Maeght Foundation, Nice, 2014
- G. Maldonado: "The Importance of Being in the World: The Figurative Paintings of Djamel Tatah", Château de Chambord, Chambord, 2011
- E. de Chassey: "Fragments on Identity", exhibition "I Mutanti", Villa Medici, Rome, 2010
- Philippe Dagen: "The Bodies of Thoughts", MAMAC, Nice, 2009

== See also ==
- Contemporary art
