= Paul Bigot =

French architect (1870–1942)

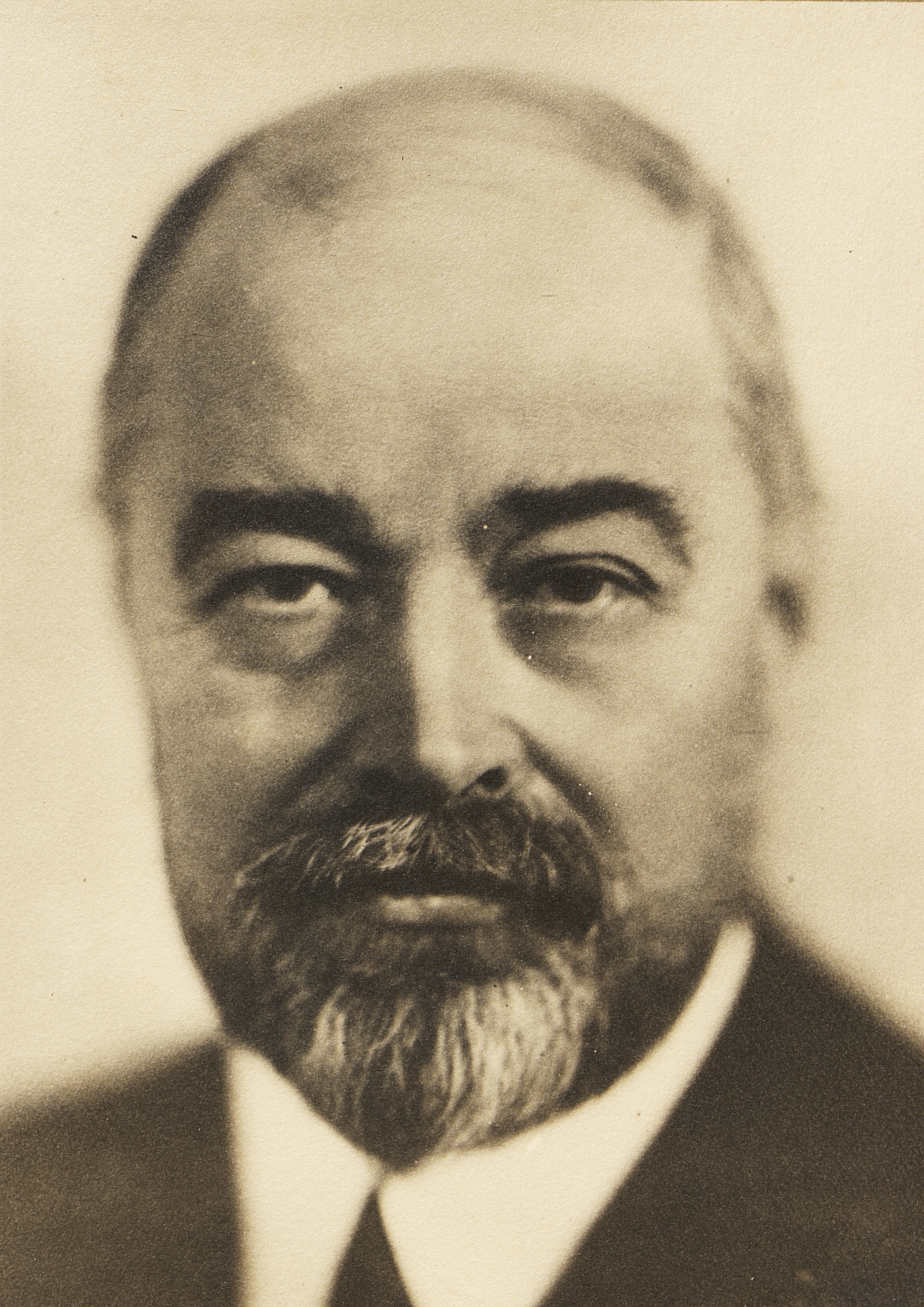
Paul Bigot (c.1940)

Paul Bigot (French: [pol biɡo]; 20 October 1870 – 8 June 1942) was a French architect.

== Biography ==
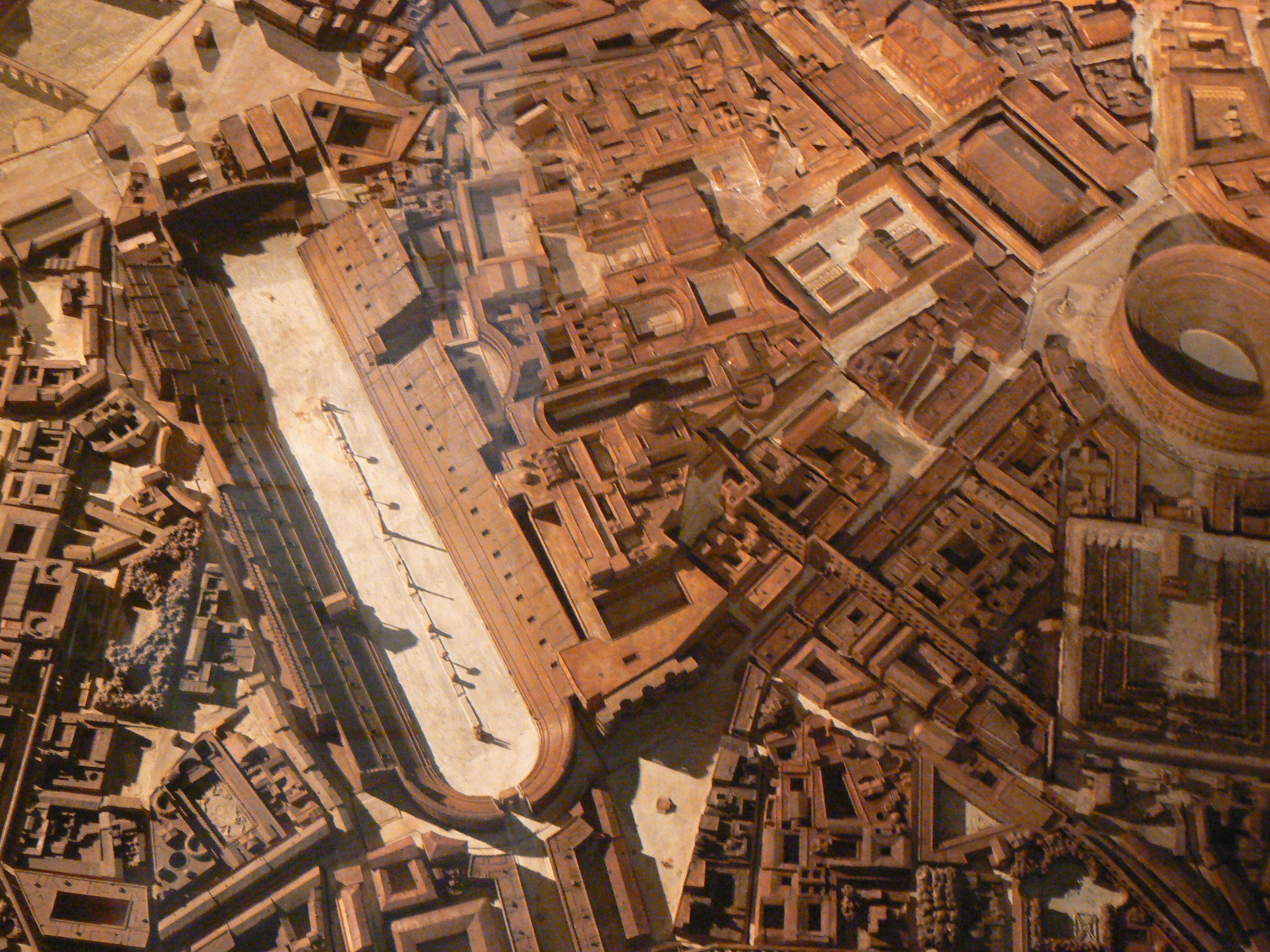
Plaster model of Rome by Paul Bigot at the University of Caen, showing the area around the Circus Maximus

Bigot was born in Orbec, Calvados. He studied architecture at the École nationale supérieure des Beaux-Arts in Paris, in the atelier of Louis-Jules André. He won the Grand Prix de Rome in 1900, which enabled him to study in Rome at the Villa Medici. He later became a professor at the École des Beaux-Arts.

He is particularly known for his "Plan of Rome", a large architectural model of Ancient Rome. It is a plaster model of about 70 square metres at a scale of 1:400, showing Rome as it would have been in the time of the emperor Constantine I (4th century AD). The model is preserved at the University of Caen and is itself listed as an ancient monument. A second version is in the Royal Museums of Art and History in Brussels.

Bigot was the architect of the Institut d'Art et d'Archéologie, in Paris, completed in 1932.

== Works ==
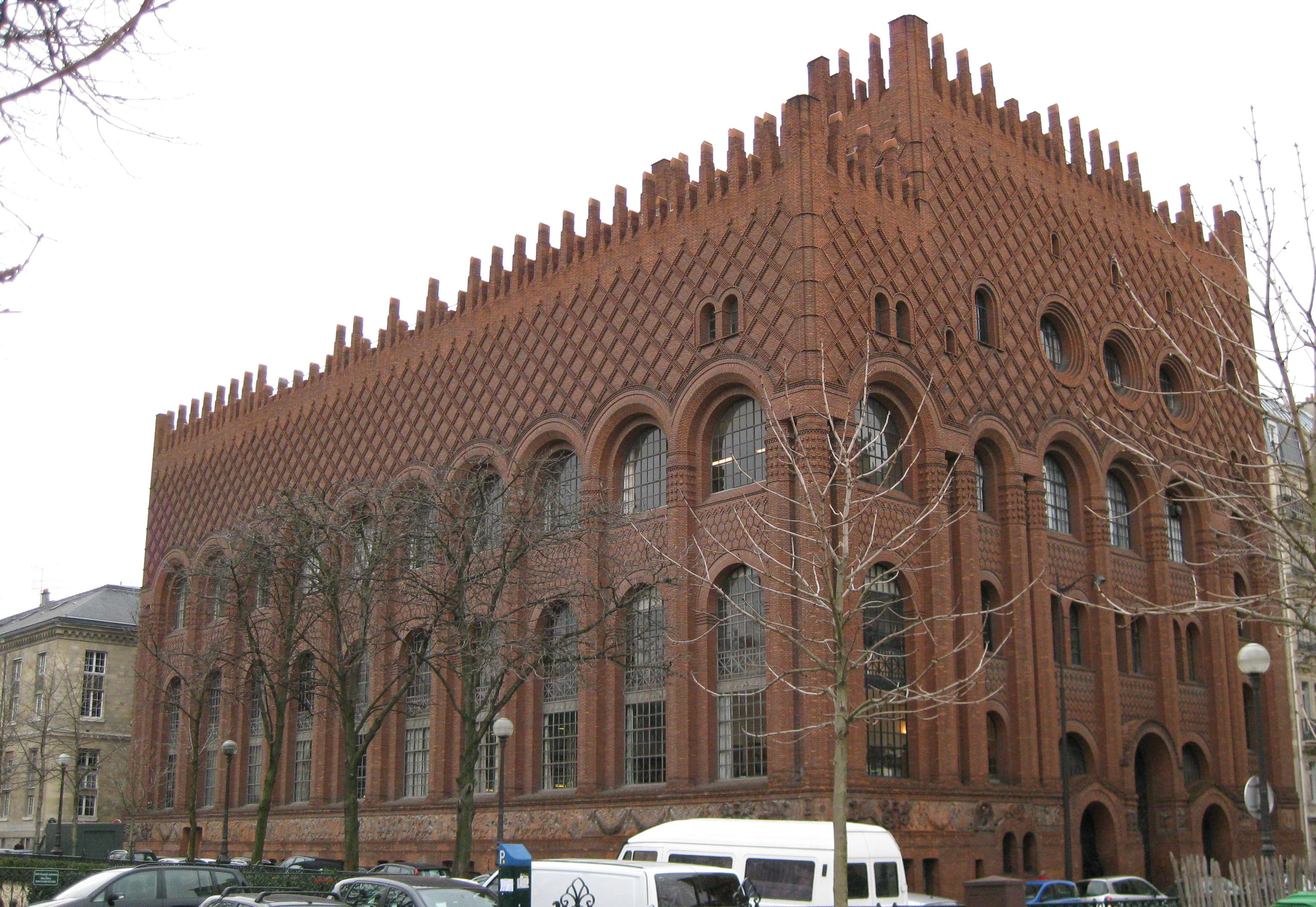
Institut d'Art et d'Archéologie in Paris

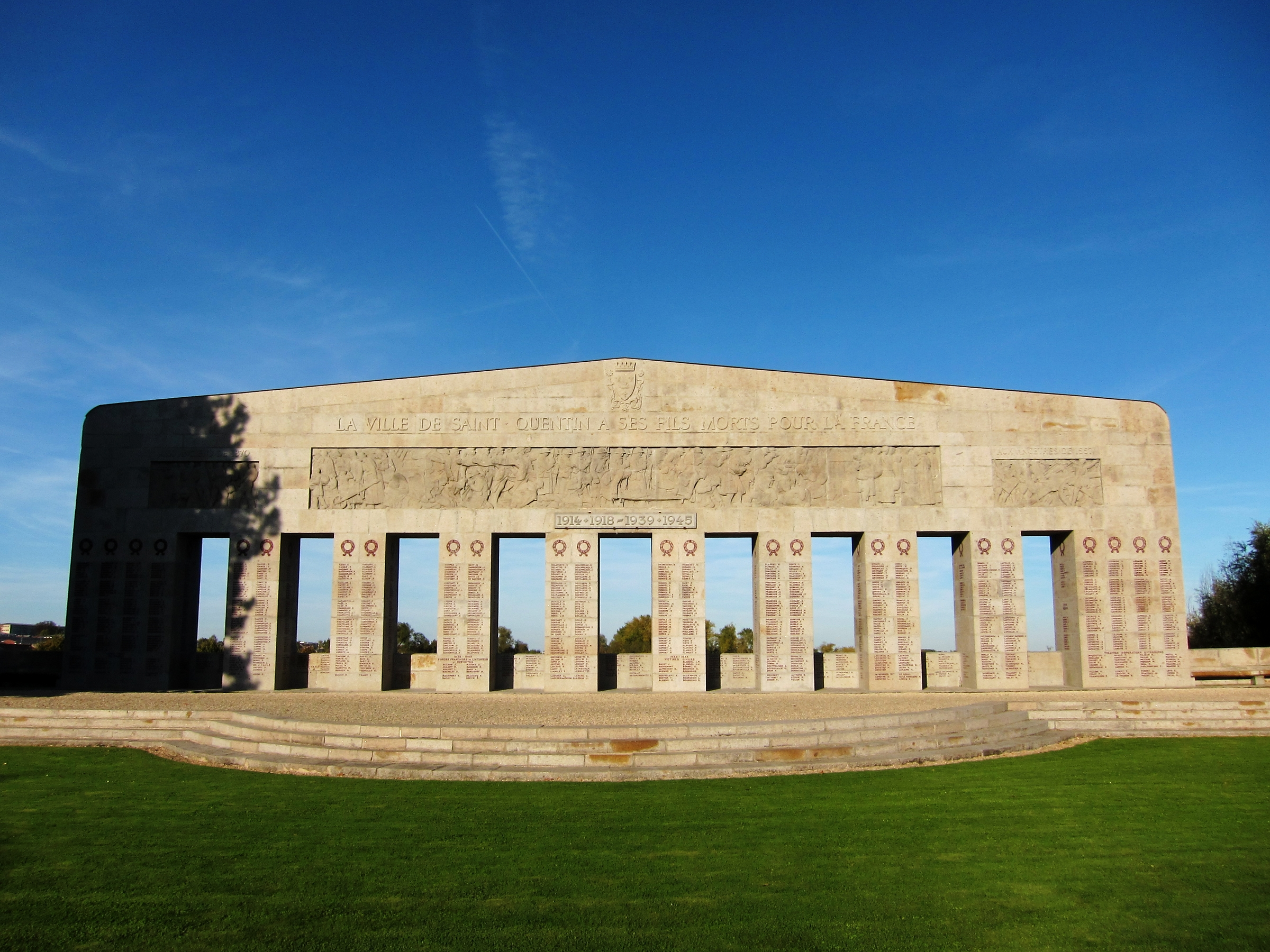
Monument aux Morts in Saint-Quentin

- 1908-1942: Plan de Rome, a large model of Rome in 350 CE.
- 1920-1932: Institut d'Art et d'Archéologie, Paris
- 1922: reconstruction of the town of Fargniers following its comprehensive destruction during World War I, in association with Henri Paul Nénot, financed by the Carnegie Endowment for International Peace
- 1924-1934: reconstruction of the neighborhood around the Saint-Quentin station in Saint-Quentin, including the Monument aux Morts with sculptors Henri Bouchard and Paul Landowski
- 1930: Monument of the First Battle of the Marne in Mondement
- 1933: Monument to Aristide Briand on the Quai d'Orsay, Paris, with Henri Bouchard and Paul Landowski
- 1935: refurbishment of Hôtel Matignon as office and residence of the French Prime Minister
- 1935-1939: expansion of the Ministry of Foreign Affairs
- 1936: Monument to Ferdinand Foch, Paris, with sculptor Robert Wlérick

== See also ==
- Armando Brasini
- Paul Tournon
