= Institut d'Art et d'Archéologie =

Institute of Art and Archaeology of Paris
- Institut d'Art et d'Archéologie
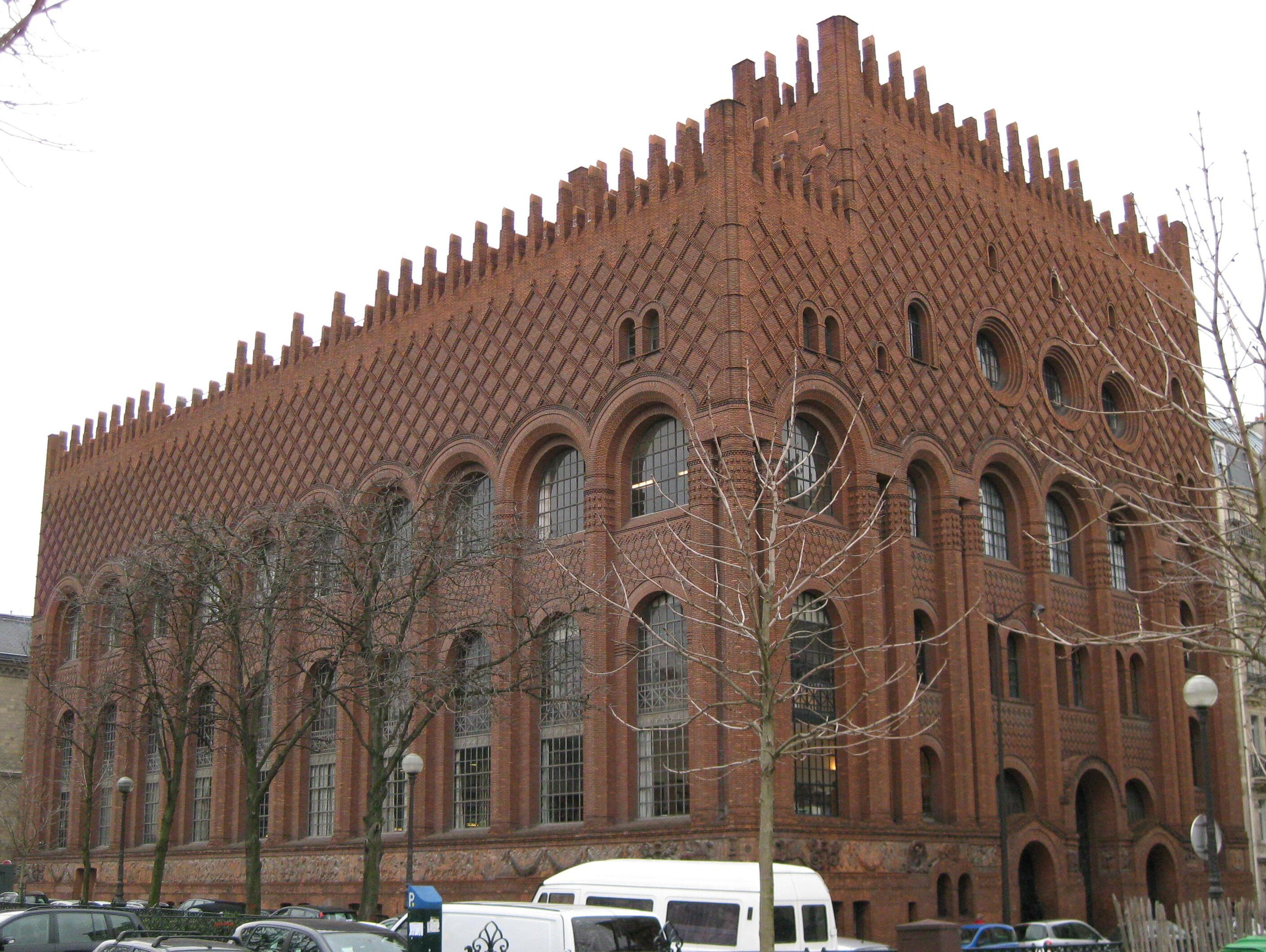
- View from the Jardin des Grands-Explorateurs

- Location within Paris
- Alternative names: Michelet or Michelet Campus

General information
- Type: Academic
- Location: 3 Rue Michelet, Paris
- Coordinates: 48.8423°N 2.3360°E
- Current tenants: Sorbonne University and Paris 1 Panthéon-Sorbonne University
- Completed: 1925-1928
- Owner: Government of France (Ministry of Higher Education)

Design and construction
- Architect: Paul Bigot

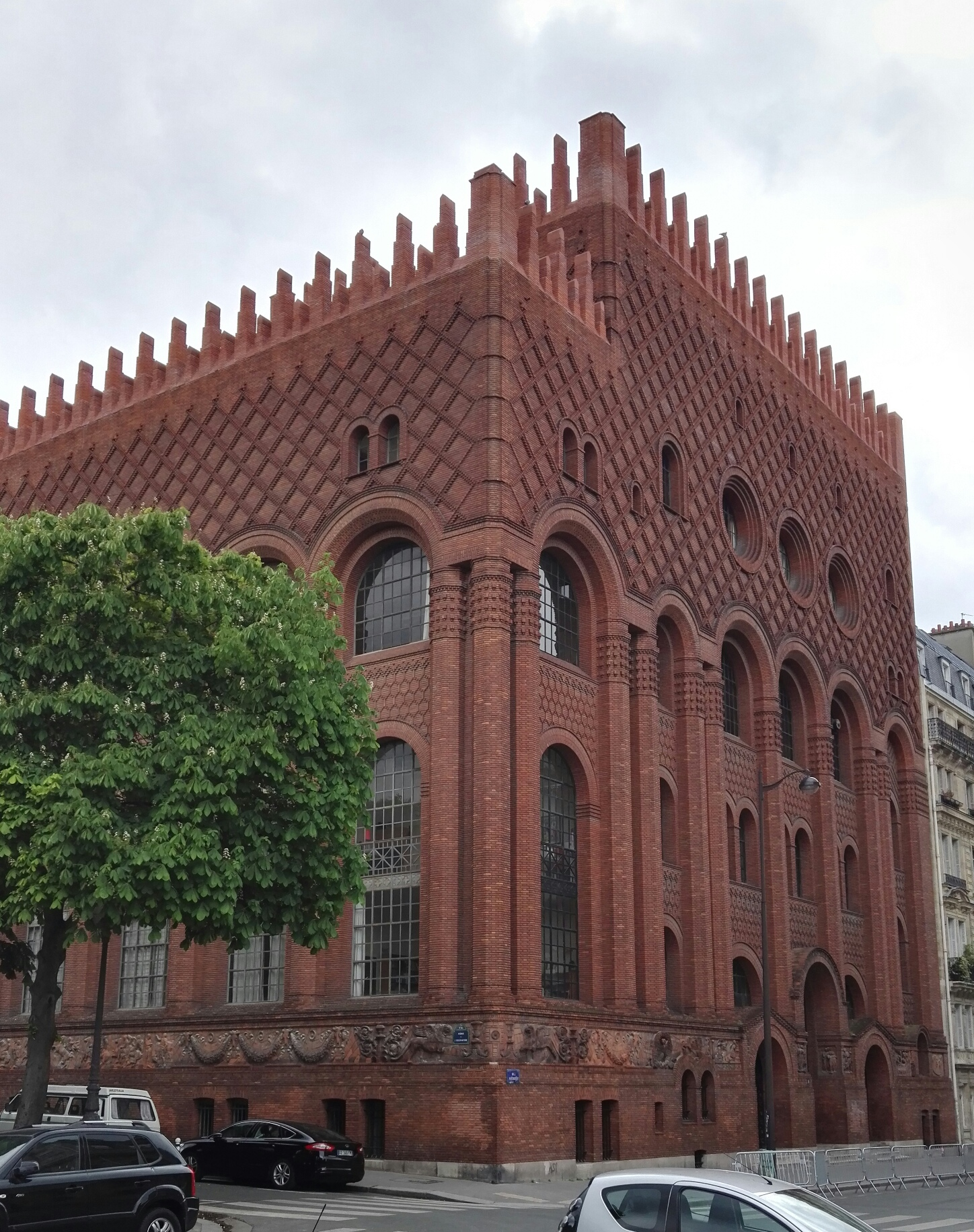
Institut d'Art et d'Archéologie, Paris

The Institut d'Art et d'Archéologie, also known as the Michelet Campus, is a building at 3 rue Michelet in Paris, built for the educational institution of the same name (French for "Institute of Art and Archaeology"). It was initially designed in 1920 in a unique eclectic style by architect Paul Bigot, and completed in 1932. It has been dubbed "the most curious building in Paris". It is a campus of the universities of Paris.

The building is currently occupied by the Art and Archeology Department of the Sorbonne University Faculty of Arts and Humanities and the Sorbonne School of Art History and Archaeology, a department of Paris 1 Panthéon-Sorbonne University.

== Overview ==
In 1908, designer Jacques Doucet initiated a pioneering library of art-related books complemented by research works he sponsored, and in late 1917 donated it to the University of Paris. In 1913, Paris University administrator Louis Liard advocated the creation of a new art history institute and received a promise from Marchioness Marie-Louise Arconati-Visconti for a donation of two million francs, which she later increased to three million. Additional funds were contributed by the City of Paris and the French government.

In March 1920, three prominent scholars, Émile Mâle, Gustave Fougères and René Gabriel Schneider, outlined a specific program for the future institute that would incorporate Doucet's library at the center, surrounded by classrooms that benefit from natural light. Paul Bigot won the two-round architectural competition in October 1920, with a design conceived as an alternative to the architectural rationalism that was ascendant in France at the time.

The building's structure is made of reinforced concrete, and its facades are clad with bright red brick manufactured at the Gournay brickworks on the current municipality of Vitry-sur-Seine. The unique design carries echoes of Tuscan Renaissance architecture and the Doge's Palace in Venice,, but Bigot's creative reinterpretation has also elicited comparisons with a synagogue, a hammam, a sub-Saharan African kasbah, the Alhambra in Granada, the Baths of Diocletian and church of Santa Maria in Ara Coeli in Rome, among others. Construction started in May 1924 and was substantially completed in 1928, but the decoration and interior fittings took four more years. It was formally inaugurated in 1931. The exterior frieze, first sketched by Bigot in 1922, was only completed in 1934, and the Doucet Library was eventually installed in 1935.

On the ground level runs a red terracotta frieze, mostly produced at the Manufacture nationale de Sèvres, that reproduces iconic sculptures whose study was part of the art history curriculum. They include lion-faced gargoyles from Himera, the Ludovisi Throne, sections of the Parthenon Frieze, garlands from Rome's Ara Pacis, the Battle of Actium relief from Palestrina, griffins from the entablature of Rome's Temple of Antoninus and Faustina, and the Cantoria of Luca della Robbia in Florence, as well as non-Classical sculpture from Ancient Egypt, Assyria and Angkor Wat on the rear side. The metalwork for the entrances on rue Michelet was created by Raymond Subes. Mirroring Bigot's eclectic mixing of distinct periods of art history on the brick facades, the main door combines motifs of ancient Roman lattice and medieval quatrefoil, and the side doors display a mix of Greek volutes and quatrefoil.

On the upper (fourth) floor, Bigot reserved a large space for a copy of his lifelong passion, a large plan-relief of ancient Rome in plaster (predating Italo Gismondi's more famous Il Plastico at the Museum of Roman Civilization). The institute's model, installed in September 1933, was destroyed by students during May 68, whereas the surviving original is now kept at the University of Caen Normandy.

In 1993, Doucet's library left the institute to join the Bibliothèque nationale de France, and was transferred to the newly created Institut National d'Histoire de l'Art in 2003. In March 1997, a new library was established in the Institute in its place hosting less rare art-related books and other resources, known as the -Bibliothèque Michelet.

The building was listed in the Inventaire supplémentaire des monuments historiques in 1994, and as a full Monument historique in 1996. It was comprehensively renovated in the 2000s.

== Gallery ==
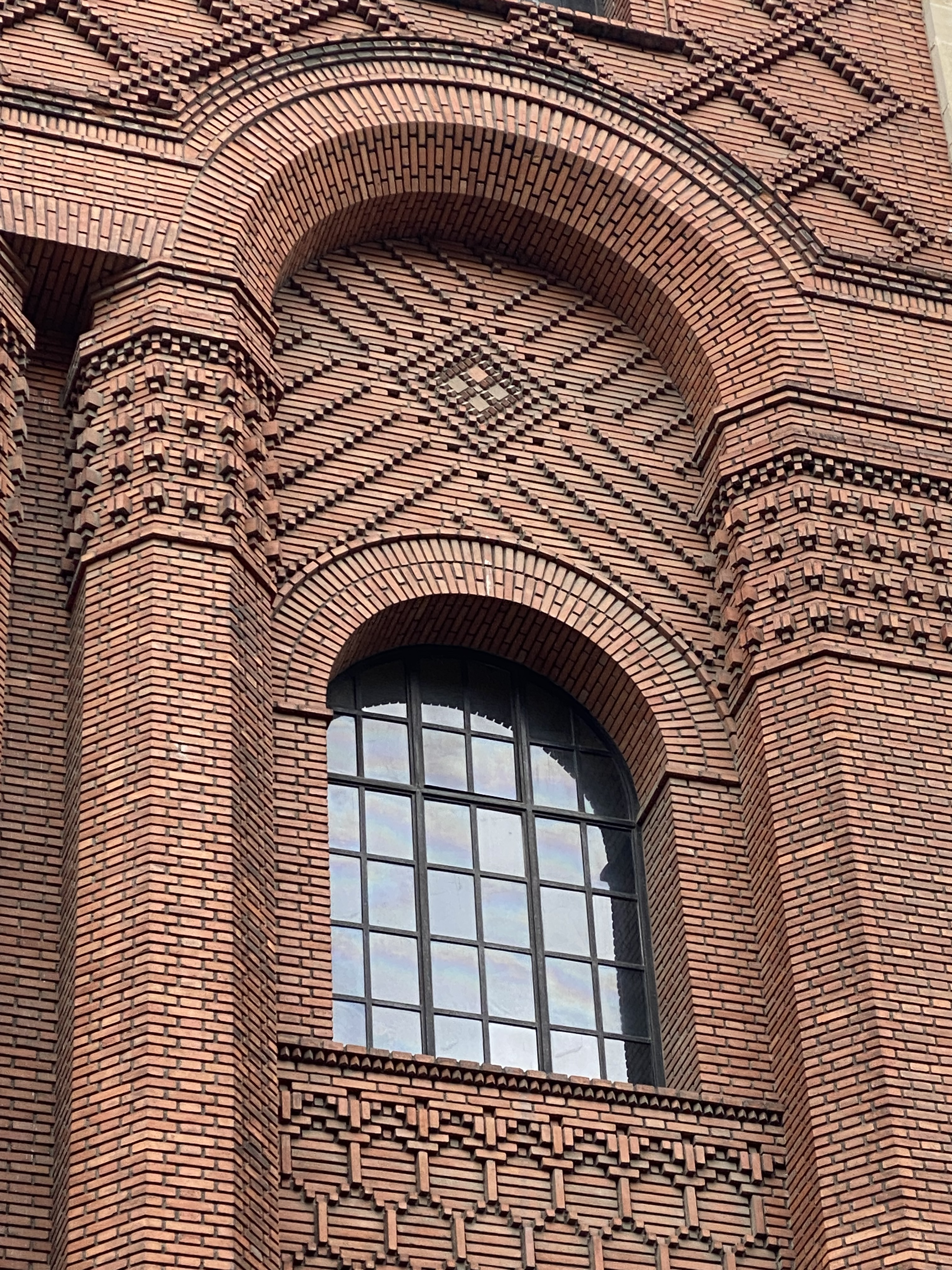
Detail of brickwork

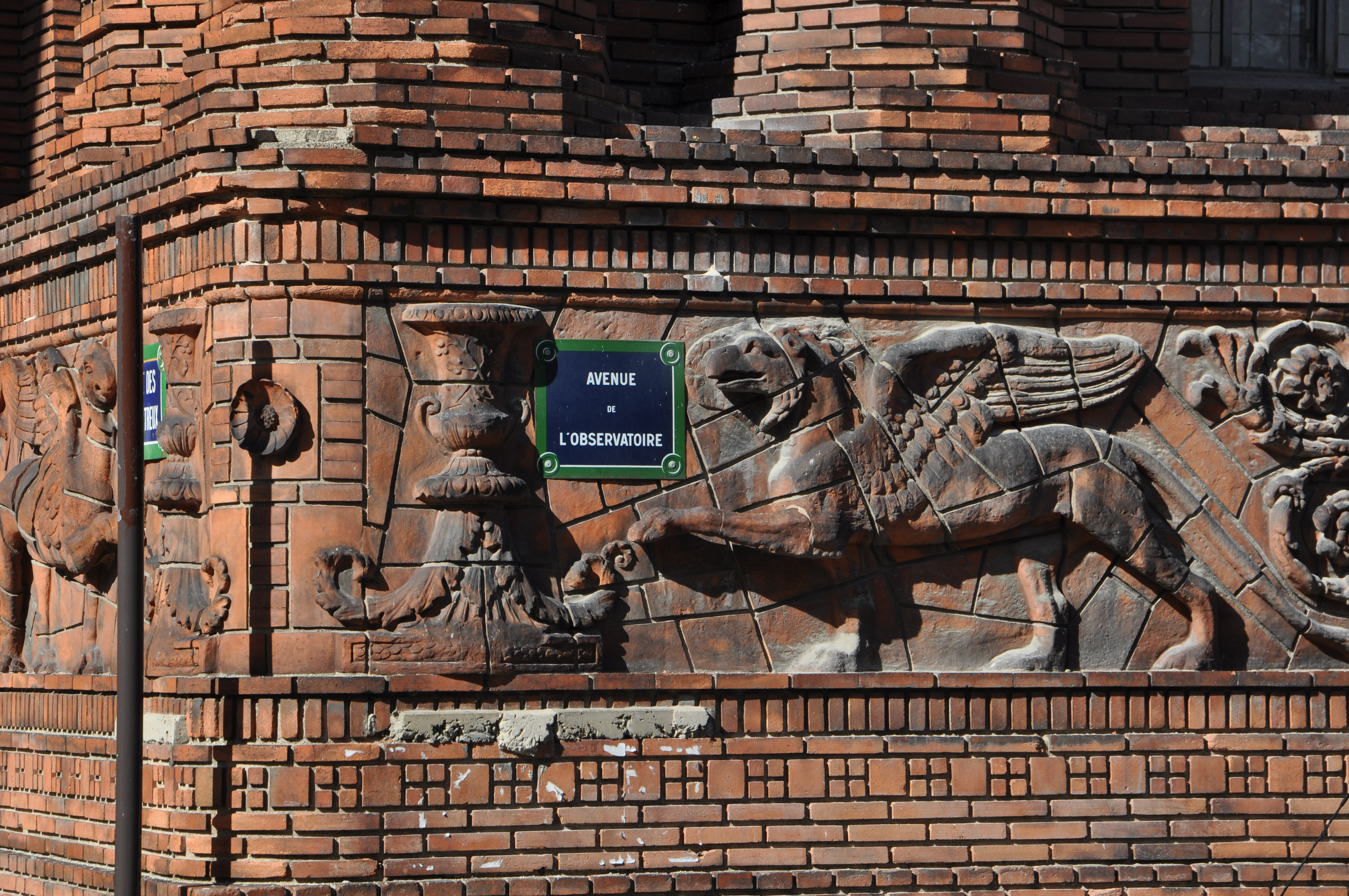
Detail of decorative frieze: classical griffin

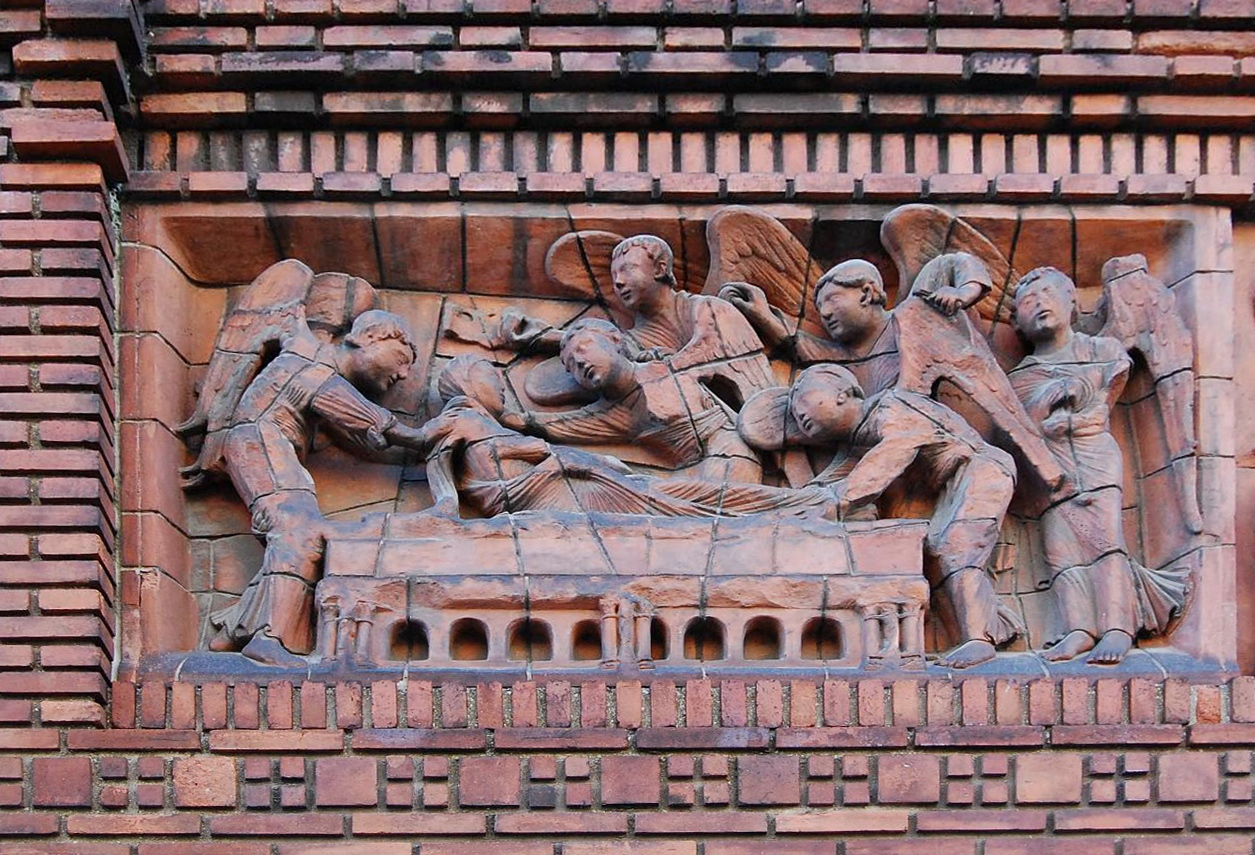
Detail of decorative frieze: Dormition of Mary reproduced from Senlis Cathedral

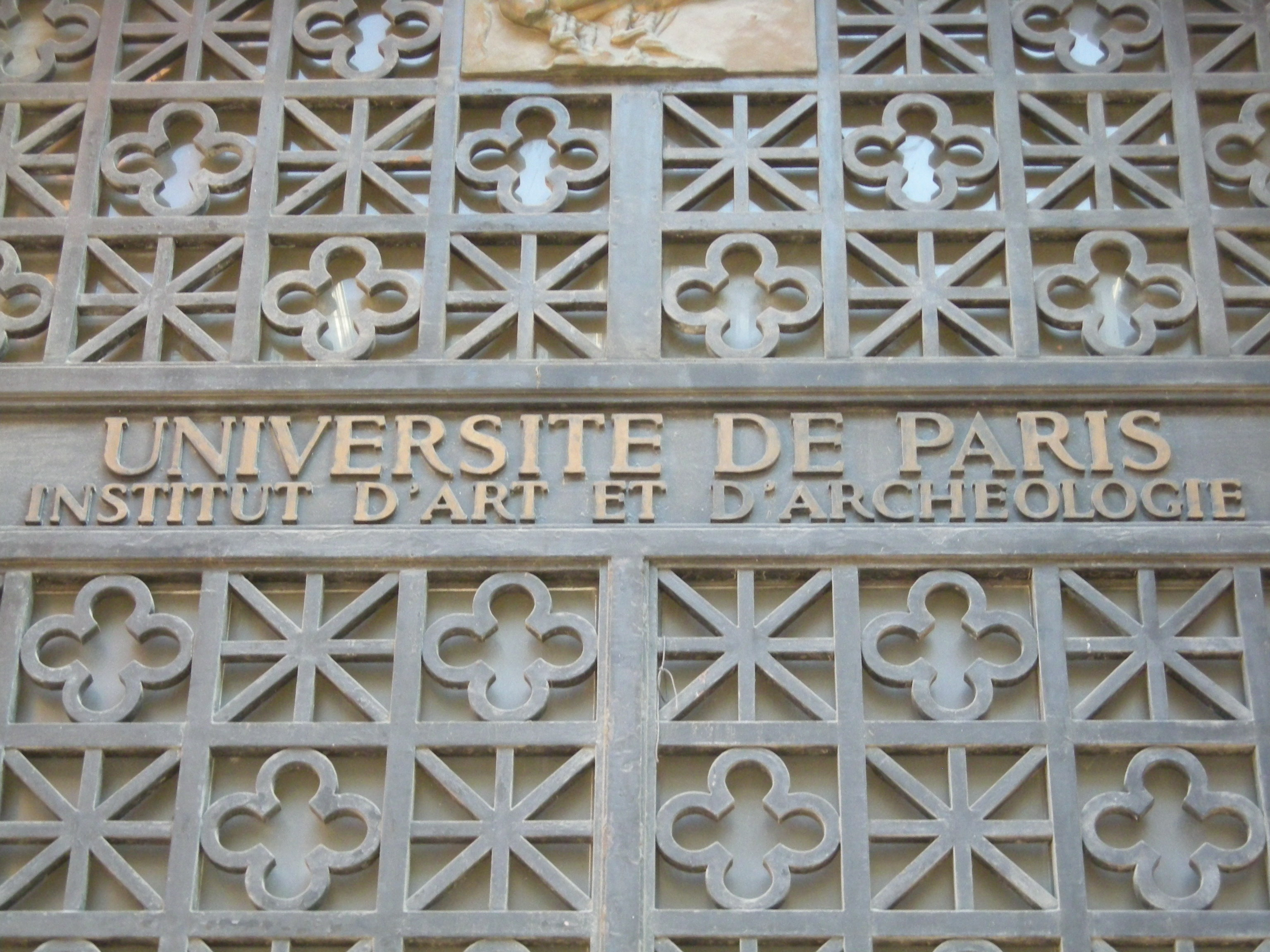
Metalwork by Raymond Subes above the main entrance

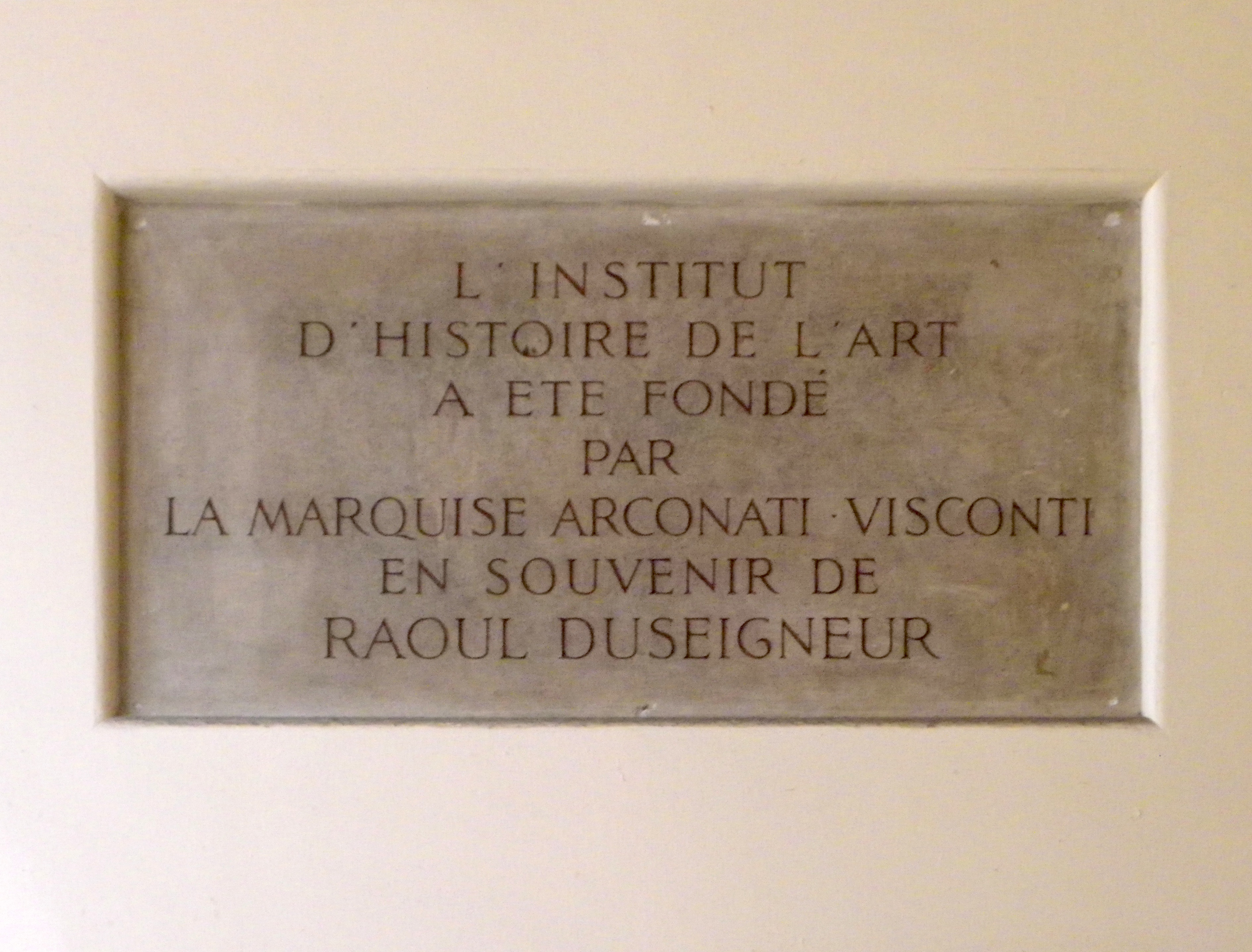
Commemorative plaque honoring Marie-Louise Arconati-Visconti

== See also ==
- Colonial School, Paris, nearby on avenue de l'Observatoire
- Bibliothèque littéraire Jacques-Doucet
