= Conseil supérieur des programmes =

The Conseil supérieur des programmes, formerly Haut Conseil de l'éducation is a French body set up in 2005, in a consultative capacity as regards essential knowledge, educational programmes and the evaluation of exam results. Established by the loi d'orientation et de programme pour l'avenir de l'école of April 23, 2005, it took over from the Haut Conseil de l'évaluation de l'école, which existed from October 2000 to November 2005. It was replaced by the Conseil supérieur des programmes (High Council for Curricula) created by the July 8, 2013 law of orientation and programming for the refoundation of the School of the Republic. The Conseil d'évaluation de l'École now plays this role of evaluating the results of the education system.

== Official texts ==
=== Article L. 230-1 ===
The Haut Conseil de l'éducation is composed of nine members appointed for a six-year term. Three of its members are appointed by the President of the Republic, two by the President of the National Assembly, two by the President of the Senate and two by the President of the Economic and Social Council from outside the membership of these assemblies. The Chairman of the High Council is appointed by the President of the Republic from among its members.

=== Article L. 230-2 ===
The Haut Conseil de l'éducation issues an opinion and may make proposals at the request of the Minister of Education on issues relating to pedagogy, curricula, methods of assessing pupils' knowledge, the organization and results of the education system and teacher training. Its opinions and proposals are made public.

=== Article L. 230-3 ===
Every year, the Haut Conseil de l'éducation submits to the President of the Republic a report, which is made public, on the results achieved by the education system. This report is forwarded to Parliament.
