= Bibliothèque littéraire Jacques-Doucet =

Coordinates: 48.8467°N 2.3467°E

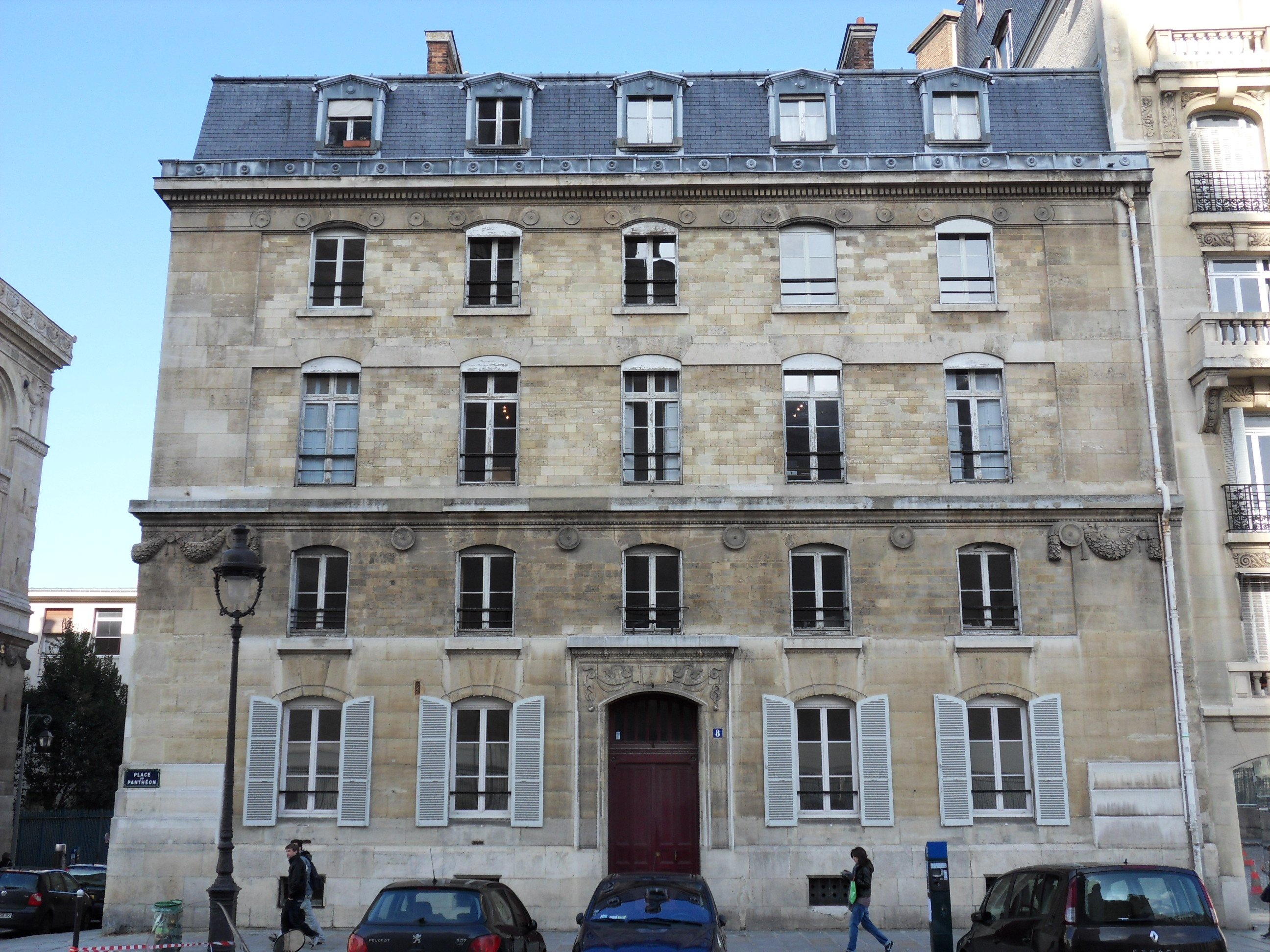
- Interactive map of the Bibliothèque littéraire Jacques-Doucet area

General information
- Type: Library
- Location: 8-10 place du Panthéon, 5th arrondissement, Paris, France

The Bibliothèque littéraire Jacques-Doucet is a public library in Paris, France. It was established in 1929 upon the death of fashion designer Jacques Doucet.

The collection of works assembled by the patron Jacques Doucet, on the advice of the writer André Suarès, started in 1916, and grew thanks to prestigious librarians and advisors, such as André Breton, Louis Aragon, Marie Dormoy and Robert Desnos. When Doucet died in 1929, his collection was bequeathed by will to the University of Paris, which transferred the works to the Place du Panthéon, under the direction of Marie Dormoy until the 1950s.

Designed to bring together the literature of what would later be called modernism and its precursors, the collection includes works by Stendhal, Charles Baudelaire, Guillaume Apollinaire and André Malraux. Various funds and collections were later added to the original legacy. As a university and research library of last resort, open to researchers, students and professionals by reservation, it has two reading rooms.

However, its operations are regularly marred by irregularities in the twenty-first century: the management of various funds (notably that of Jean Bélias), and even the misappropriation of many elements of certain legacies for the benefit of members of the management, have forced various inspection bodies to carry out audits, and its supervisory authority to lodge complaints on several occasions.

== See also ==
- Institut d'Art et d'Archéologie
- List of libraries in France
