= Institut National d'Histoire de l'Art =

French research institute

Coordinates: 48.8668°N 2.3394°E

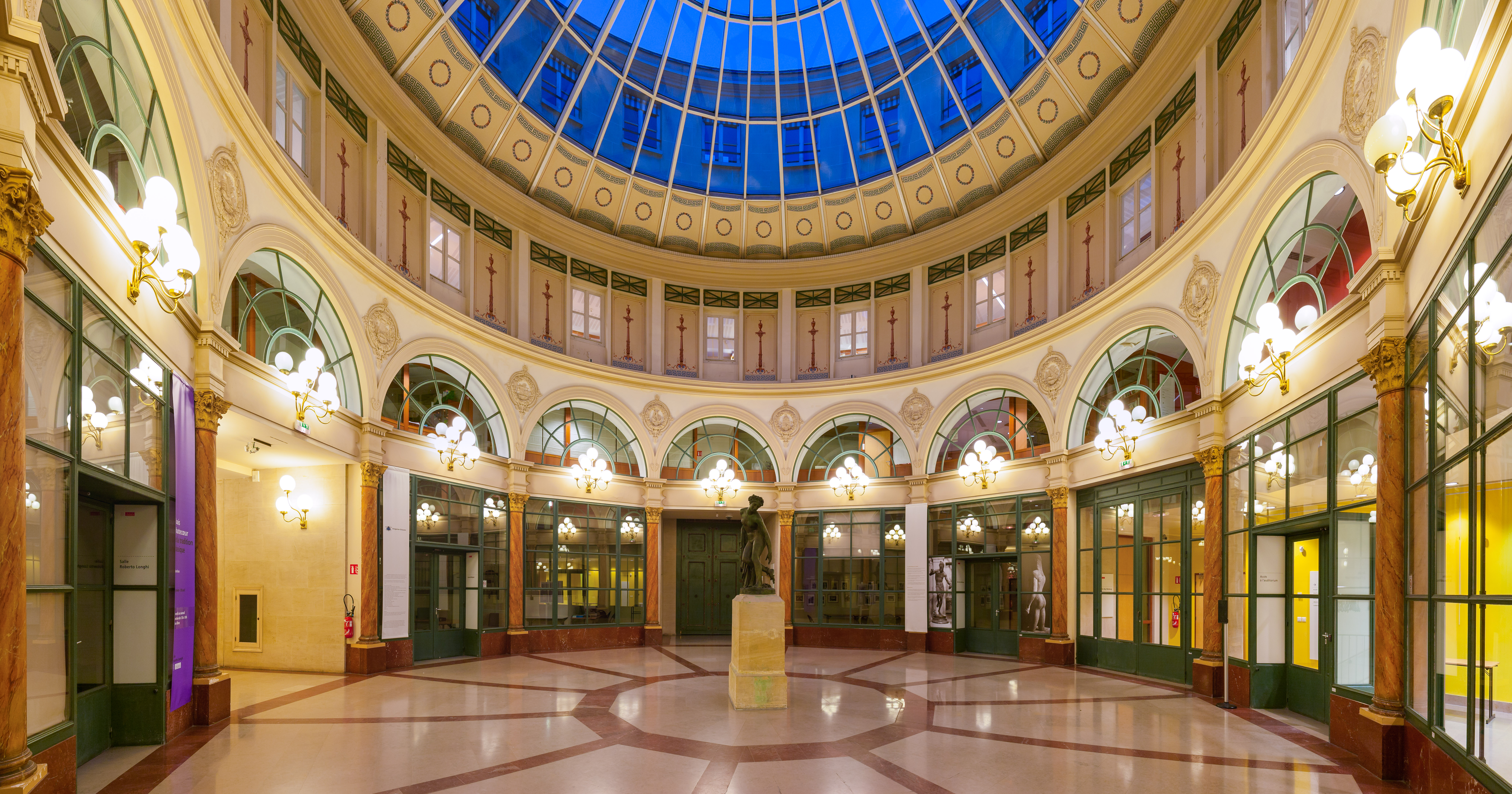
The INHA headquarters reception area is located in the Galerie Colbert (Colbert Galleria); built in 1826.

The Institut national d'histoire de l'art (French pronunciation: [ɛ̃stity nɑsjɔnal distwaʁ də laʁ]; lit. 'National Institute for Art History'), commonly abbreviated INHA, is a French research institute, created and governed by Decree No. 2001-621 (July 12, 2001), and situated in Paris. The Institute develops scientific activity and contributes to international cooperation in most fields of art history and heritage by exercising research, training and knowledge-diffusion.

== Headquarters ==
The reception area of INHA's headquarters is located at 2 rue Vivienne in the Galerie Colbert, part of the former 17th-century town house of Jean-Baptiste Colbert converted into a gallery in the 19th century. INHA's Department of Education and Research (Département des Études et de la Recherche, DER) is also located at this site.

== Library ==
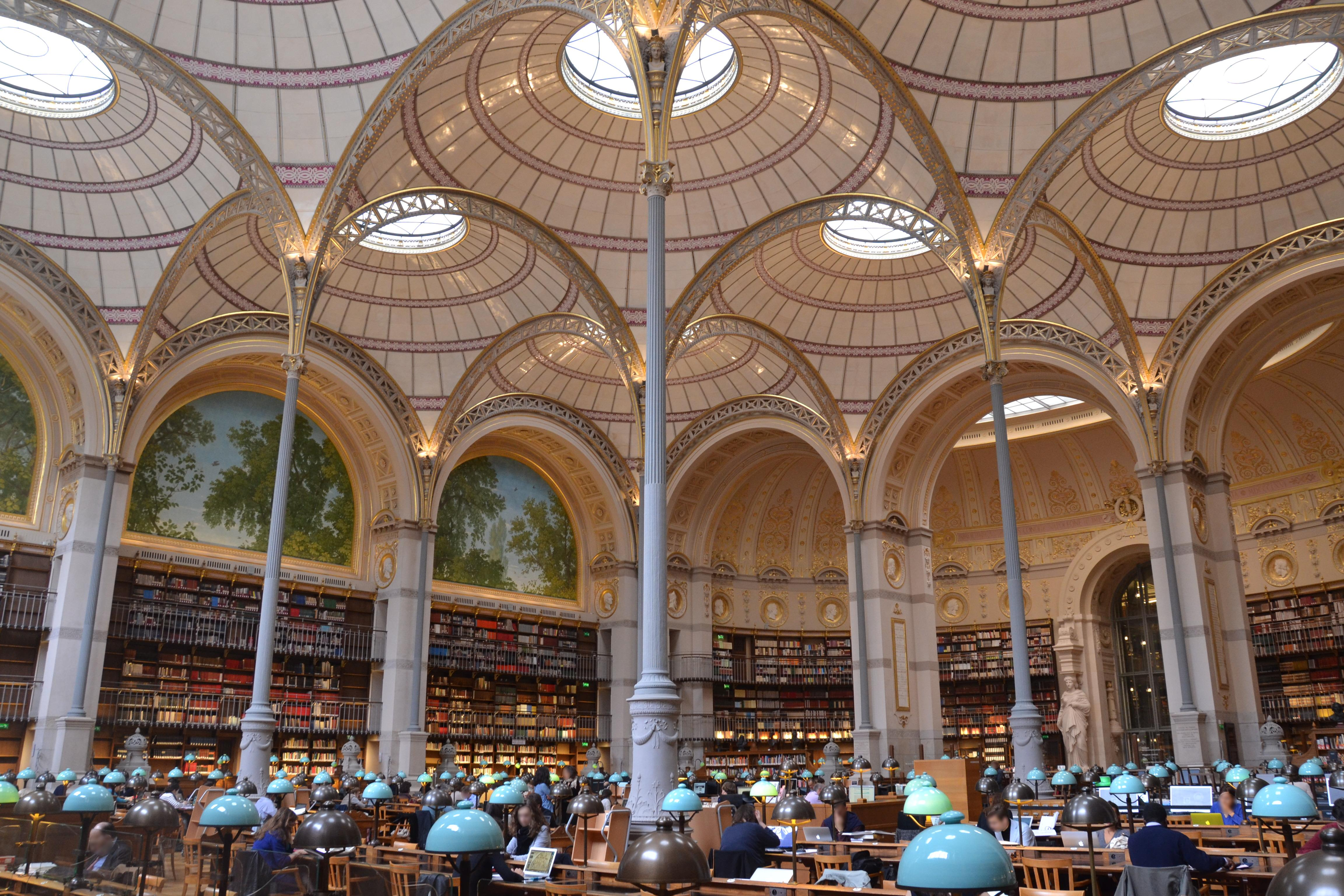
The Salle Labrouste, home of INHA's library since 2016

INHA's art history library is in the former reading room of the Bibliothèque nationale de France (BnF), the Salle Labrouste (designed by the architect Henri Labrouste and completed in 1867), which is located at 58 rue de Richelieu in the Richelieu Quadrilateral Area of what is now the Site Richelieu of the BnF. It is the responsibility of the Department of the Library and Documentation (Département de la Bibliothèque et de la Documentation, DBD).

The core of the library's collections was derived from the Art and Archeology Library founded by Jacques Doucet in 1897 and donated in 1917 to the University of Paris. Doucet's library (formerly located at the Institut d'Art et d'Archéologie) was transferred in 1992 to the Site Richelieu's Salle Ovale and, after coming under the management of INHA in 2003, was eventually moved to the nearby Salle Labrouste, where it opened on 15 December 2016.

Further acquisitions have expanded the collections of INHA's library to approximately 1,700,000 documents, including 1,800 manuscripts, 20,000 rare books, 30,000 prints and drawings (including ones by Manet, Degas, Toulouse-Lautrec, Van Gogh, and Matisse; exceptional Japanese prints by Utamaro; and a rich collection of posters), more than 45,00 autograph letters by artists and art critics, 96,000 cartons of exposition invitations (an inexhaustible source of information concerning the circulation of works of art), and 750,000 photographs.

== Activities ==
The INHA's mission is to promote international art historical research in all fields of the history of art. It pilots many programs by gathering together university researchers and curators. It organises study days, symposiums, conferences and meeting-debates and develops different resources, documentary bases and research programs in art history. Each year, the INHA invites about sixty art historians, among them experienced researchers, academics, curators, art critics and doctoral students. Twice a year, the INHA publishes a scientific review on art history entitled Perspective. Many documentary bases are to be found on the INHA's website.

The INHA provides access to external and internal online databases like AGORHA (Accès global et organisé aux ressources en histoire de l’art) which allows several search modes in 54 research fields of the INHA, like the RETIF (Répertoire des tableaux italiens dans les collections publiques françaises (XIIIe-XIXe siècles)) which gives (clic on Consulter les données, then on Oeuvres) the 14,056 Italian paintings held in French public collections, the RETIB Recensement des tableaux ibériques dans les collections publiques françaises (1300-1870) or the Recensement de la peinture produite en France au XVIe siècle.
