= House of Paquin =

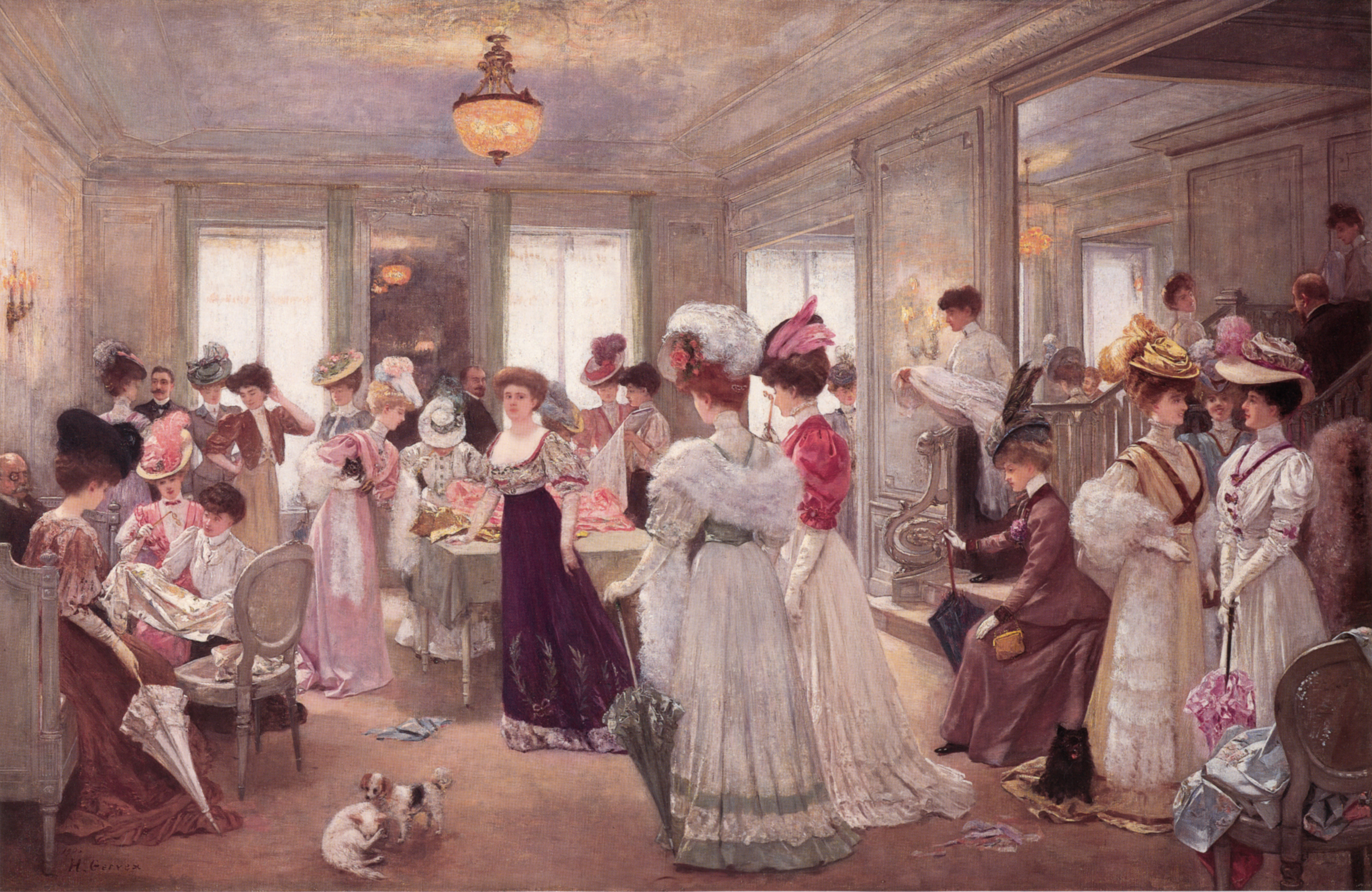
1906. 'Five Hours at Paquin' by Henri Gervex

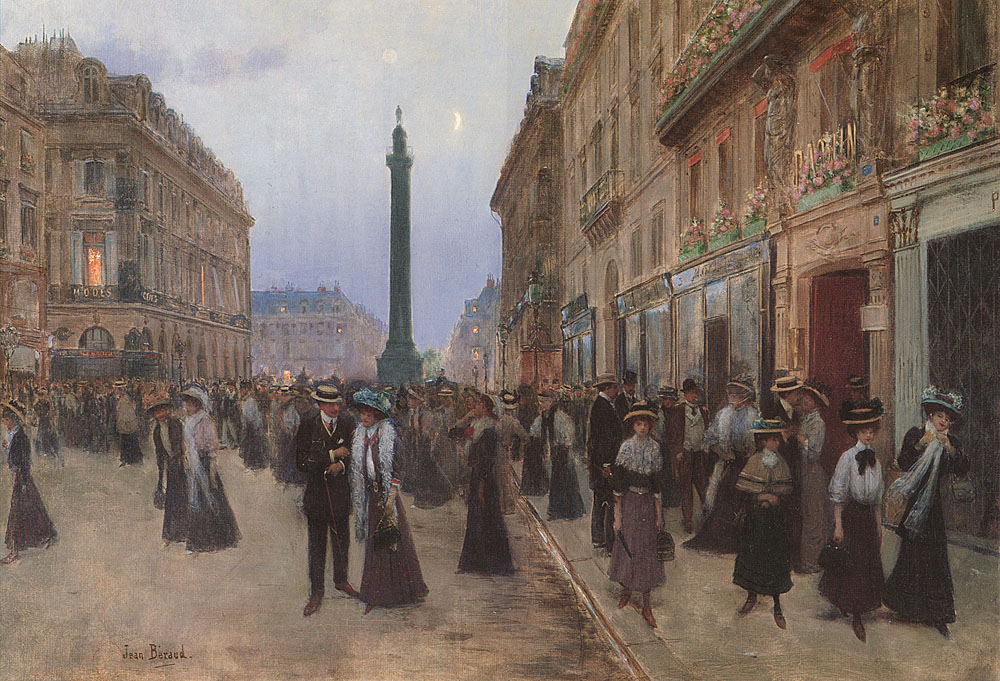
1907. 'La Rue de la Paix' by Jean Béraud. Paquin's salon is on the far right.

The House of Paquin was a French design and clothing company, established in Paris in 1891. Although it had not signed an agreement to that effect, in 1929, the House of Paquin had let it become known that it was adhering to the conditions and program imposed by the eight houses forming what had become known as the "Couture Group". All decisions reached by that group would also apply to Paquin. House of Paquin acquired the House of Worth in 1950. Paquin closed operations in 1956. As of 2020,the brand has been resurrected and is now owned by Arno Gasquet.

== History ==
Founded in 1891, close to the Place Vendôme, at No. 3 Rue de la Paix, Paris, the Paquin House at first utilized only the first floor, but under the directorship of Isidore René Jacob, known as Paquin, and his wife, Jeanne Paquin, an extension soon became necessary.

On the death of the founder, the direction of the business was entrusted to the hands of Monsieur Clement, who entered the firm soon after its foundation. By 1924, the firm owned the whole of No. 3 and occupied, in addition, two floors of a building at the back.

Whereas many dressmaking firms of the day supplied each of their mannequins with a complete set of robes and mantles, the House of Paquin had a special mannequin for the exhibition of mantles. Furthermore, in order to save time, all the mantles were hung up in one corner of the room under the staircase. Paquin dealt in all articles appertaining to dress-tailor-mades, mantles, afternoon gowns, evening dresses, and furs. The complete trousseau was a specialty. Originalty without eccentricity was the watchword. It was the "chic parisien," and the dresses, especially the evening dresses, always brought about a certain astonishment, either by reason of the cut, or of the trimmings, or of the material. In the silhouette, the mode of the season was always respected. Dyeing was another important side of the firm's activities, and one workroom was devoted to that.

=== House of Paquin under Jeanne ===
In 1891, Jeanne and Isidore Paquin opened their Maison de Couture at No. 3 Rue de la Paix, next to the celebrated House of Worth. Jeanne was in charge of design, while Isidore ran the business.

Initially, Jeanne favored the pastels in fashion at the time. Eventually, she moved on to stronger colors like black and her signature red. Black had been traditionally the color of mourning. Jeanne made the color fashionable by blending it with vividly colorful linings and embroidered trim.

Jeanne Paquin was the first couturier to send models dressed in her apparel to public events such operas and horse races for publicity. Paquin also frequently collaborated with the illustrators and architects such as Léon Bakst, George Barbier, Robert Mallet-Stevens, and Louis Süe. She was also known to collaborate with the theatre, in a time when other houses rejected collaboration. In 1913, a New York Times reporter described Jeanne as "the most commercial artist alive".

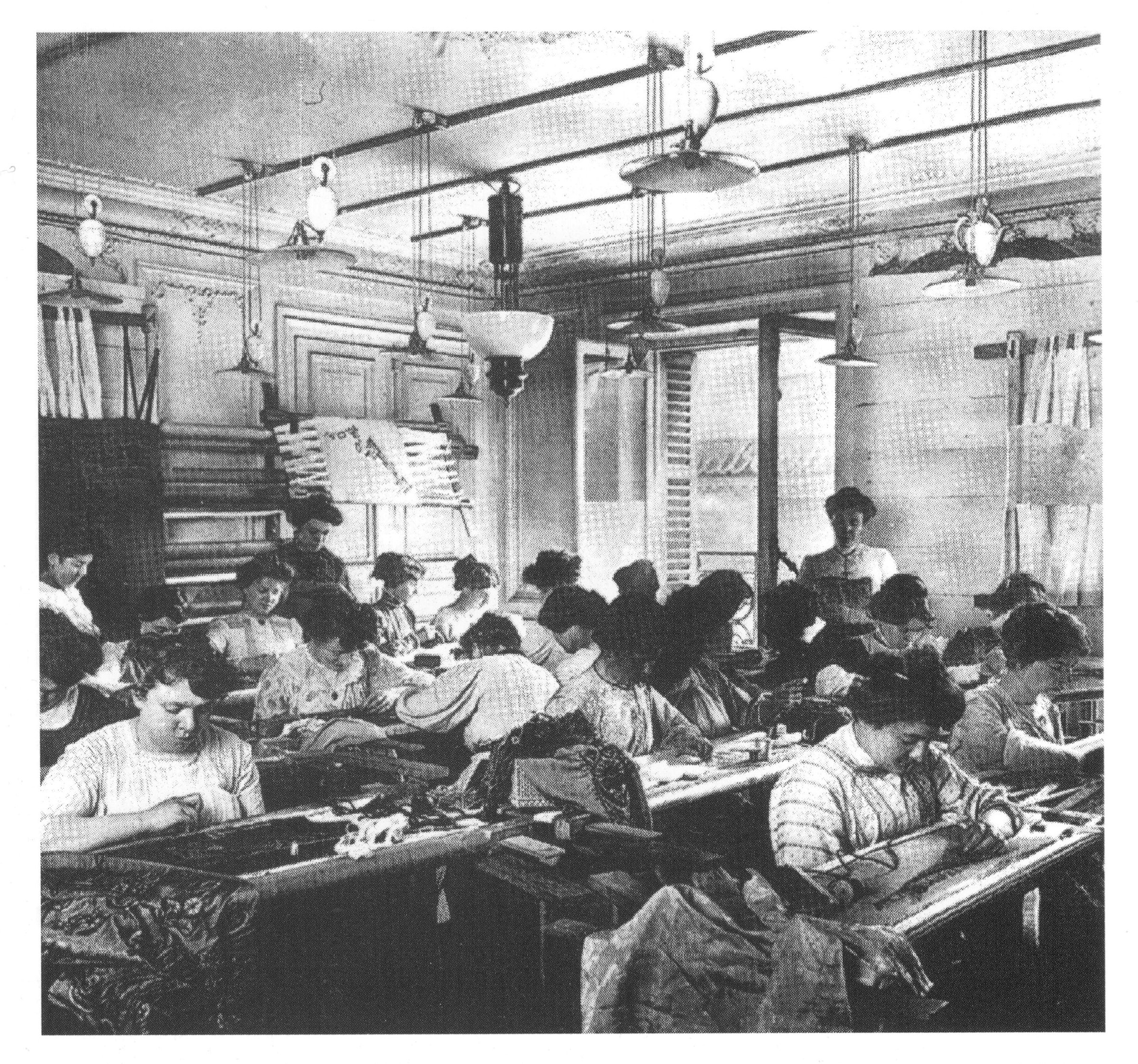
Sewing, c. 1910

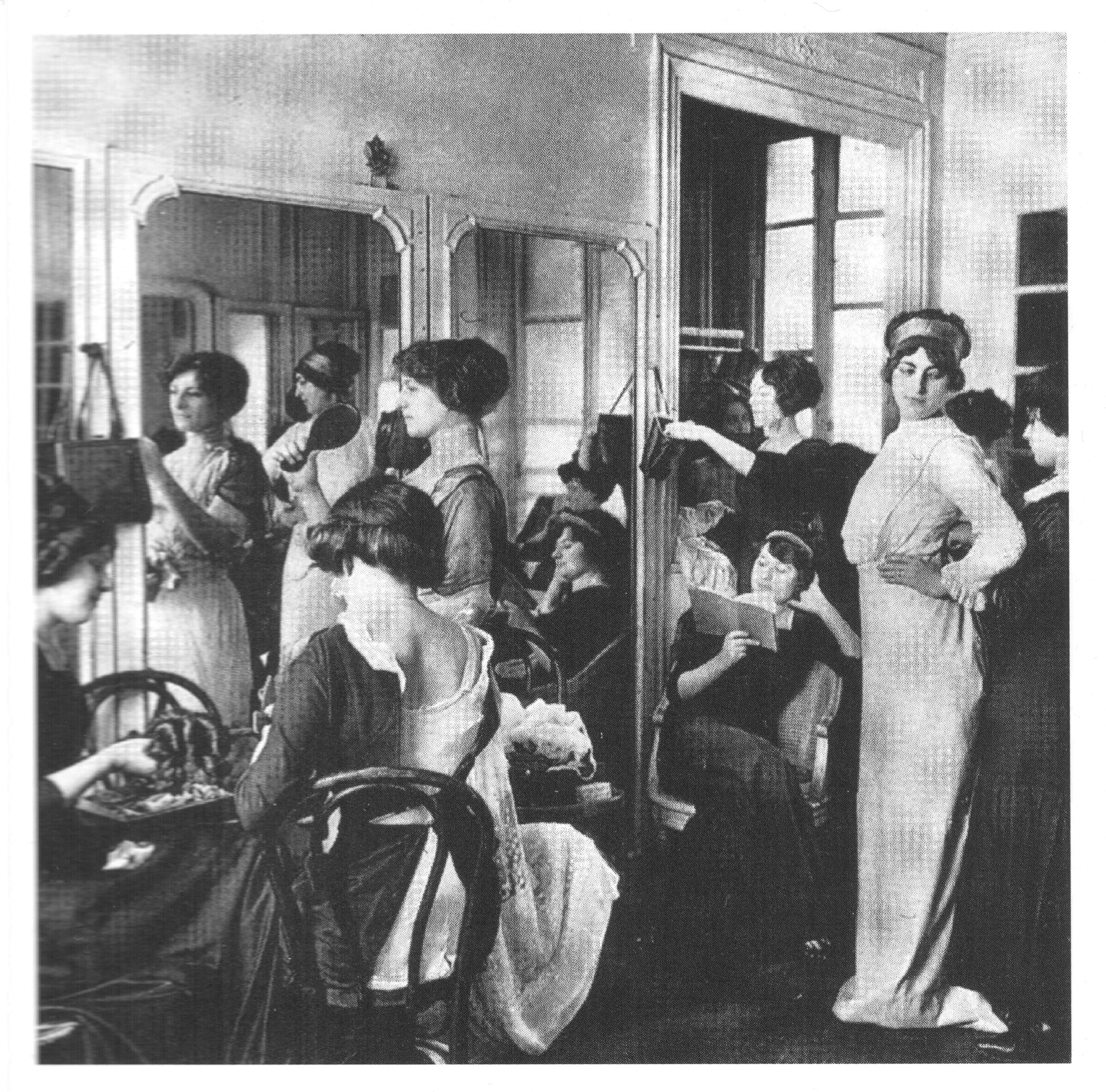
Changing room, c. 1910

A London branch of The House of Paquin was opened in 1896 and the business became a limited company the same year. This shop employed a young Madeleine Vionnet. The company later expanded with shops in Buenos Aires and Madrid.

In 1912, Jeanne and her half-brother opened a furrier, Paquin-Joire, on Fifth Avenue in New York City. The same year, Jeanne signed an exclusive illustration contract with La Gazette du Bon Ton. La Gazette du Bon Ton featured six other leading Paris designers of the day – Louise Chéruit, Georges Doeuillet, Jacques Doucet, Paul Poiret, Redfern & Sons, and the House of Worth.

By 1913, frequest representations from customers in the New World encouraged the opening of branches in New York and Buenos Ayres. In spite of trade disadvantages, due to the demand for less elaborate costumes and ornamentation, the House of Paquin maintained its universal reputation. Principles of sound finance placed the company on a sounder and more enduring basis than ever. Its value was augmented much beyond the Dover Street freehold by certain freeholds in Paris, which had been acquired and largely paid for out of profits.

In 1914, Jeanne toured the United States; for US$5, attendees saw The House of Paquin's latest designs. Despite the high ticket price, the tour sold out.

At its height, the House of Paquin was so well known that Edith Wharton mentioned the company by name in The House of Mirth.

At a time when couture houses employed 50 to 400 workers, the House of Paquin employed up to 2,000 people at its apex. She was the first woman to serve as president of an employers syndicate in France. The Queens of Spain, Belgium, and Portugal were all customers of Paquin. So were courtesans such as La Belle Otero and Liane de Pougy.

=== House of Paquin (1920–1956) ===
When Jeanne Paquin retired in 1920, she passed responsibility to her assistant Madeleine Wallis. Wallis remained as house designer for Paquin until 1936, the same year that Jeanne Paquin died. Between 1936 and 1941, the Spanish designer Ana de Pombo, Wallis's assistant, was house designer. In 1941, de Pombo left, and her assistant, Antonio del Castillo (1908–1984) took over as head designer. In 1945 del Castillo left Paquin to become a designer for Elizabeth Arden, and would later become head designer for the house of Lanvin. He was succeeded by Colette Massignac, who was tasked with the challenge of keeping Paquin going during the post-War years, when new designers such as Christian Dior were receiving greater publicity and attention. In 1949, the Basque designer Lou Claverie became head designer at Paquin, until 1953, when he was succeeded by a young American designer, Alan Graham. However, Graham's understated designs failed to reinvigorate the brand of Paquin, and the Paris house closed on 1 July 1956.

== Architecture ==
The Paquin establishment was one of the landmarks of the Rue de la Paix. From the exterior, the establishment looked like a hanging garden of flowers. The balconies and window ledges were always abloom. The entrance was right off the street, and on this ground floor was an interesting shop where many of the dainty things of dress were to be found.

In the windows, furs were often exposed to the public gaze, for the House of Paquin possess a shop front on the street. On entering, delicate lingerie of all types and girls' evening gowns were exposed on models. Continuing, buyers passed through the lingerie salesroom before ascending to the first floor gallery, where at sales times, the saleswomen gathered under the director's eye. Passing into the salesroom, a fairly large room overlooking the Rue de la Paix, the business air prevailed. Plain gray cane chairs were set around the room and formed a contrast to the yellow carpet. From one end of the room commenced the double staircase leading to the second floor. The general view obtained from the steps of this staircase on the animated salesroom at exhibition time, and also when the mannequins arrive in file through the passage at the end of the room, was characterized as "superb". Continuing along the passage, one would pass into the workrooms through a glass door hung with silk curtains. Three workrooms were given over to the furs, two for the preparation of the skins, and one for the piecing together. Although the workrooms were fairly spacious, the corridors were extremely narrow, this no doubt being due to a desire to economize on space. Many of the workers brought from home their meal, which could be warmed up in the kitchen and enjoyed in the lunchroom. The staff was provided with a meal in the dining room. The directors' office was on the second floor along with the bookkeeping, legal, and cash departments, and here again there was an absence of luxury -- the spirit of work and activity prevailing.

== Fashion ==
In 1909, the House of Paquin introduced a change of policy. Instead of the one-style idea, to which the husband was partial, Madame Paquin was displaying many distinctly different styles. She showed a number of draped costumes but in more straight lines than the other couturières. Most of the street costumes had long coats, yet, on the other hand, she displayed many smart walking costumes with coats reaching between the hips and the knees. Paquin was very fond of the fur-band trimming. It was used at this house to edge some of the shorter coats as well as a finish for the bottom of the skirt. Touches of gray were seen at Paquin's in combination with brighter colors. Gray was specially combined with the "Paquin green". Gray furs were in evidence at Paquin's, gray fox and chincilla frequently combined with blue. Paquin was also using very expensive tailless ermine. A favored Paquin material was moire; both moire velvet and moire taffeta were frequently employed in the making of gowns. Though the princesse effect below the high waist was still favored at Paquin's, yet two fetching second empire models were seen on the opening days, which were characterized as being more fetching than any displayed in Paris. These gowns were fashioned of the softest moire taffeta and ruffled straight up to the hips.

In 1915, House of Paquin made a specialty of basques, both tight and loose, worn with wide skirts, which diminished in width at the hips. The coats to the tailored suits were tight to the waist-line with flaring godets below. Leather redingotes were an extreme novelty brought out by this house.

== Gallery ==
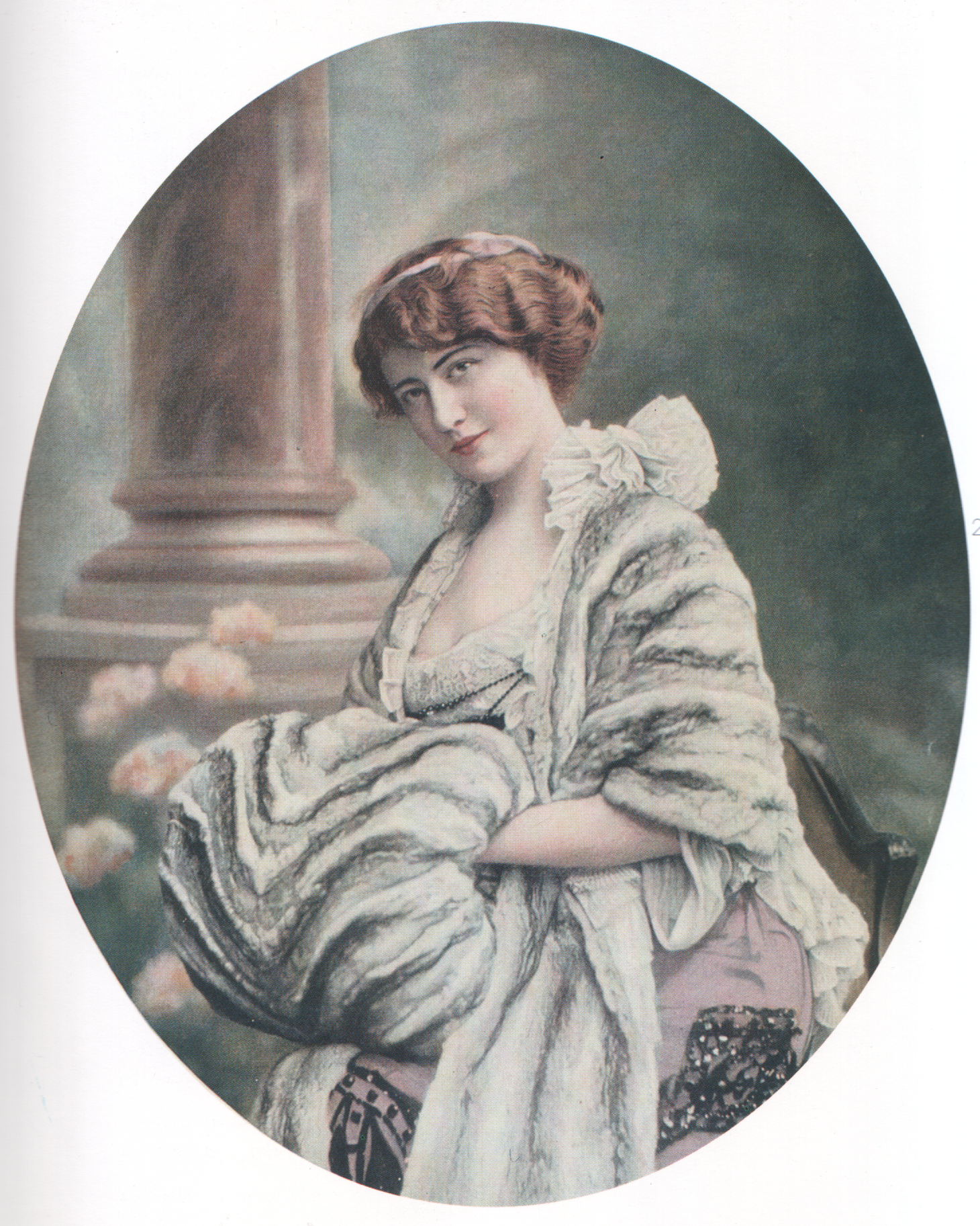
1903. Chincilla fur stole and muff by Paquin.

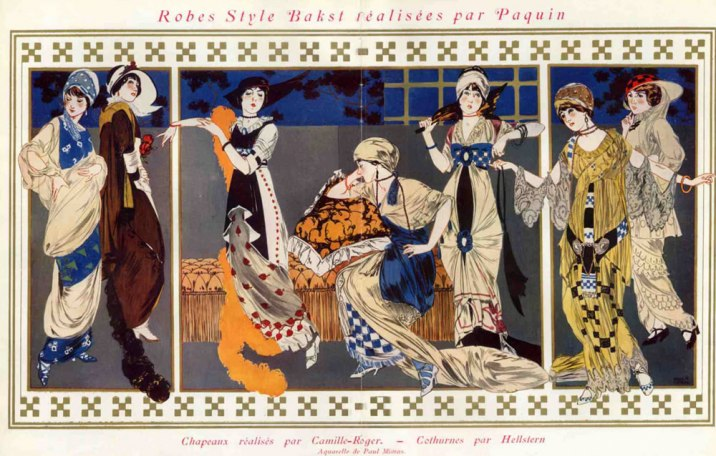
1912 dresses designed by Léon Bakst for Paquin

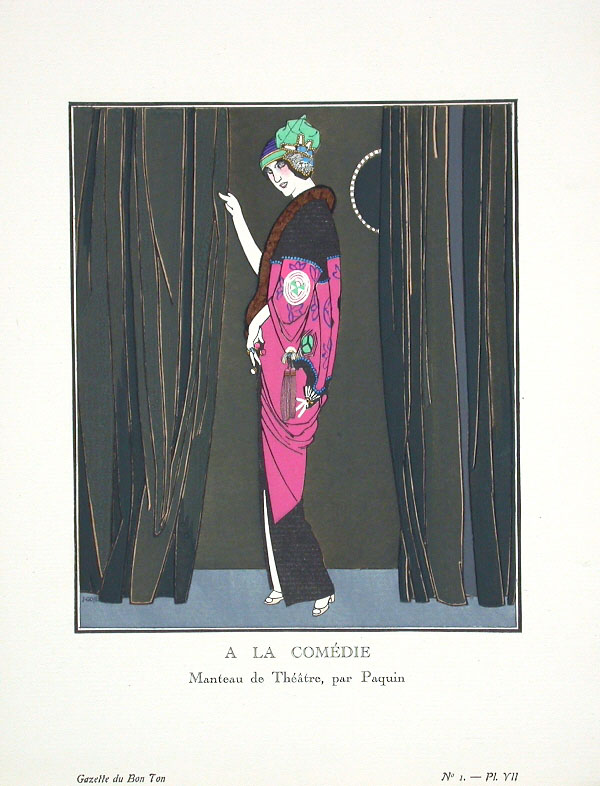
1913 theatre coat

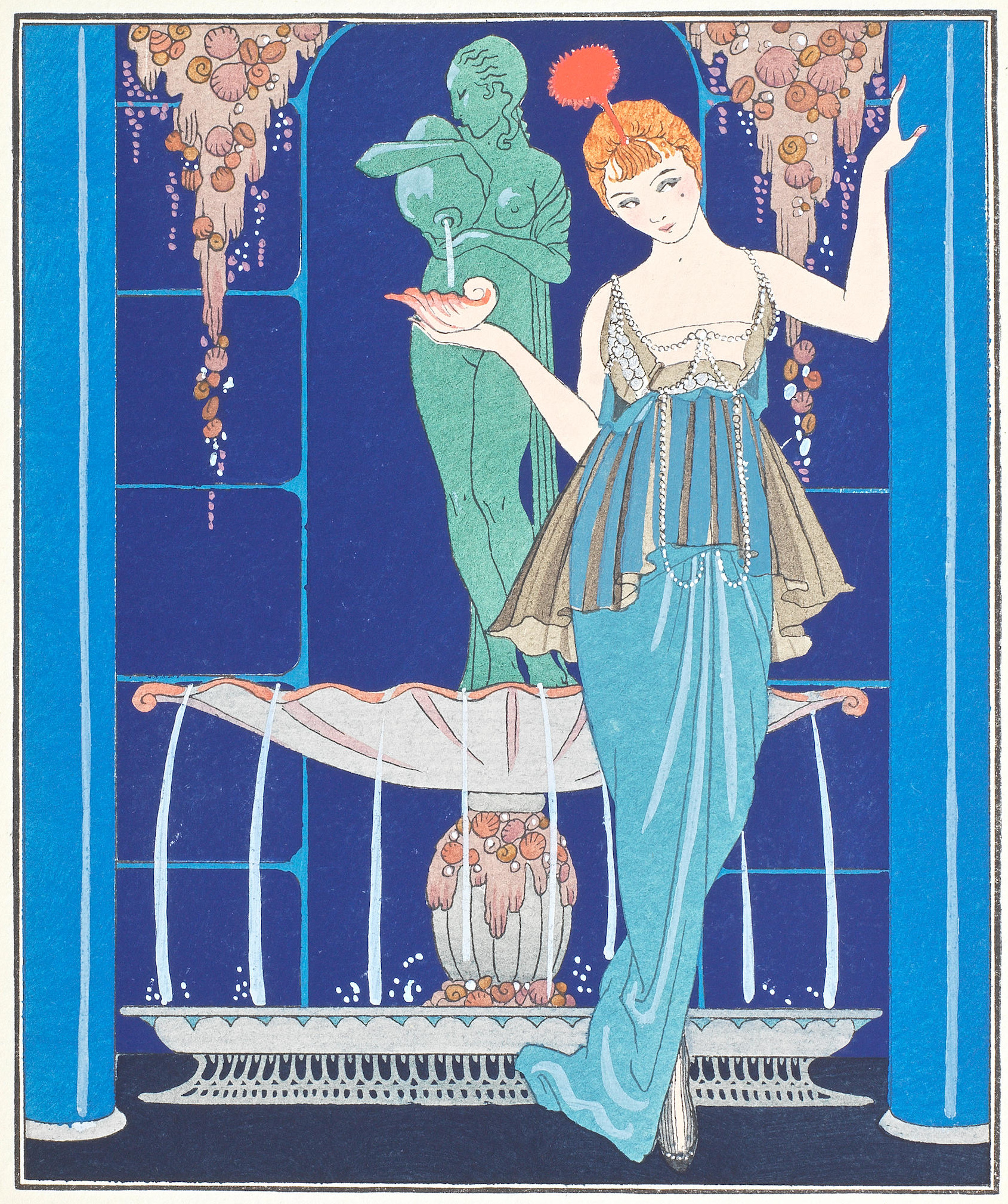
1914 evening dress

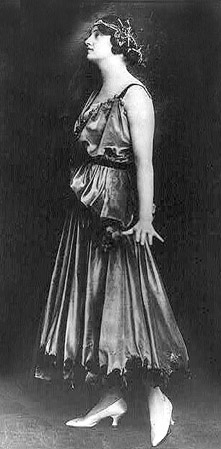
1915-17 evening dress

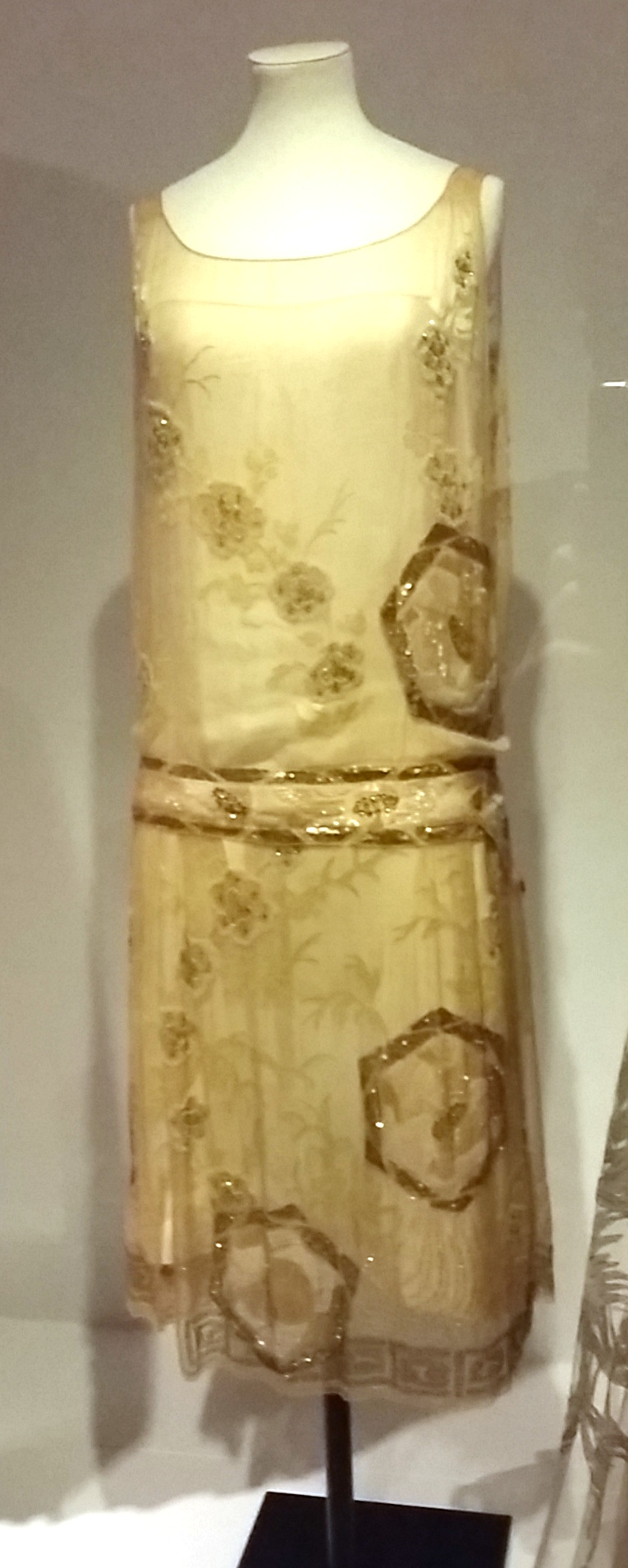
1926 chiffon evening dress

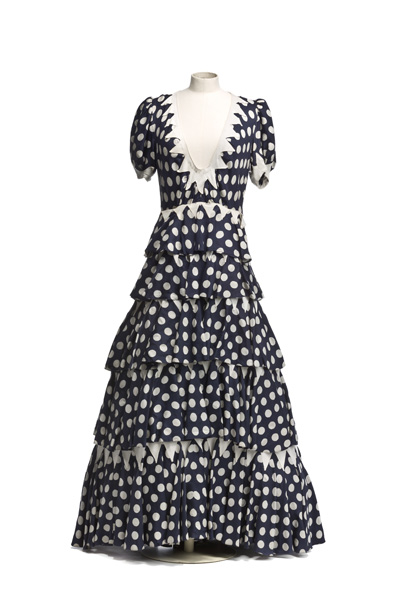
1939 flamenco style evening dress by Ana de Pombo for Paquin
