= Paquin =

Paquin is a surname, and may refer to:

- Anna Paquin (born 1982), New Zealand actress
- Ethan Paquin (born 1975), American poet
- Laurent Paquin (born 1971), Canadian comedian and talk show host
- Jeanne Paquin (1869–1936), French fashion designer
- Leo Paquin (1910–1993), American football player
- Luke Paquin (born 1978), American rock guitarist
- Marie-Thérèse Paquin (1905–1997), Canadian concert pianist and professor
- Mélanie Paquin (born 1981), Canadian beauty pageant winner
- Patricia Paquin (born 1968), Canadian actress

== Other uses ==
- House of Paquin (1891-1956), French design and clothing establishment
