= Marie Huet =

French painter

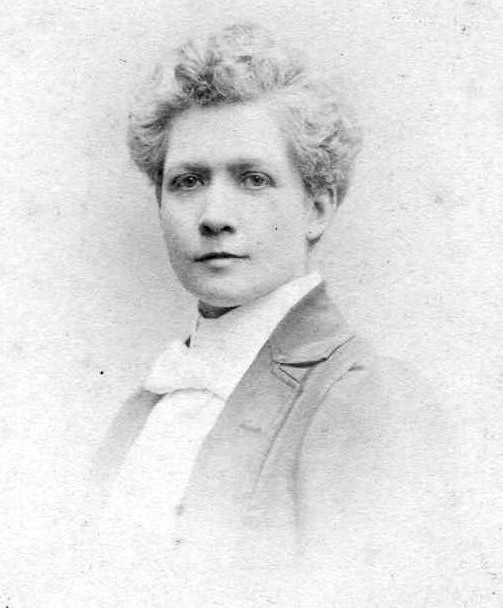
- Self portrait
- Born: 20 September 1859; Paris, France
- Education: Society of French Artists
- Occupation: Painter

Marie Huet (born 20 September 1859, in Paris), was a French painter of the 19th and 20th centuries.

== Life ==
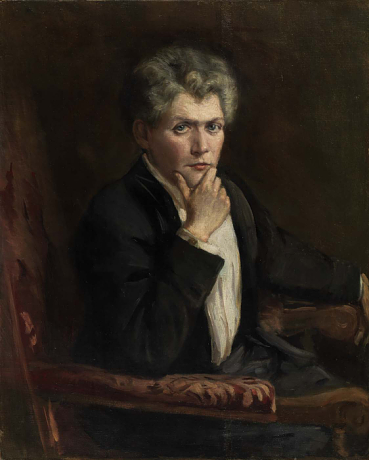
Marie Huet by Alice Pike Barney - Smithsonian American Art Museum, Gift of Laura Dreyfus Barney and Natalie Clifford Barney in memory of their mother, Alice Pike Barney

She was born in Paris. She lived in Paris as well as Solesmes and Thomery.

She joined the Society of French Artists in 1887 and regularly exhibited her works. Despite the recommendation sent by the writer Emile Goudeau to the painter and jury member Antonio de La Gandara, she never received a mention.

She was associated with the fashion icon Louise Chéruit. In 1898, she took over the fashion house of the Raudnitz sisters, which was soon renamed Huet & Chéruit and would be a real success, crowned by a Grand Prix at the Universal Exhibition. They counted among their customers Madame Astor, the princess de Broglie, the Duchesse de Gramont and the queen of Romania. The house Huet and Chéruit, the latter assuming sole artistic direction, was then one of the five big names in haute couture that dominated Paris with Callot Soeurs, Jacques Doucet, Jeanne Lanvin and Charles Worth.

She was the model of the American painter Alice Pike Barney.

== Gallery ==
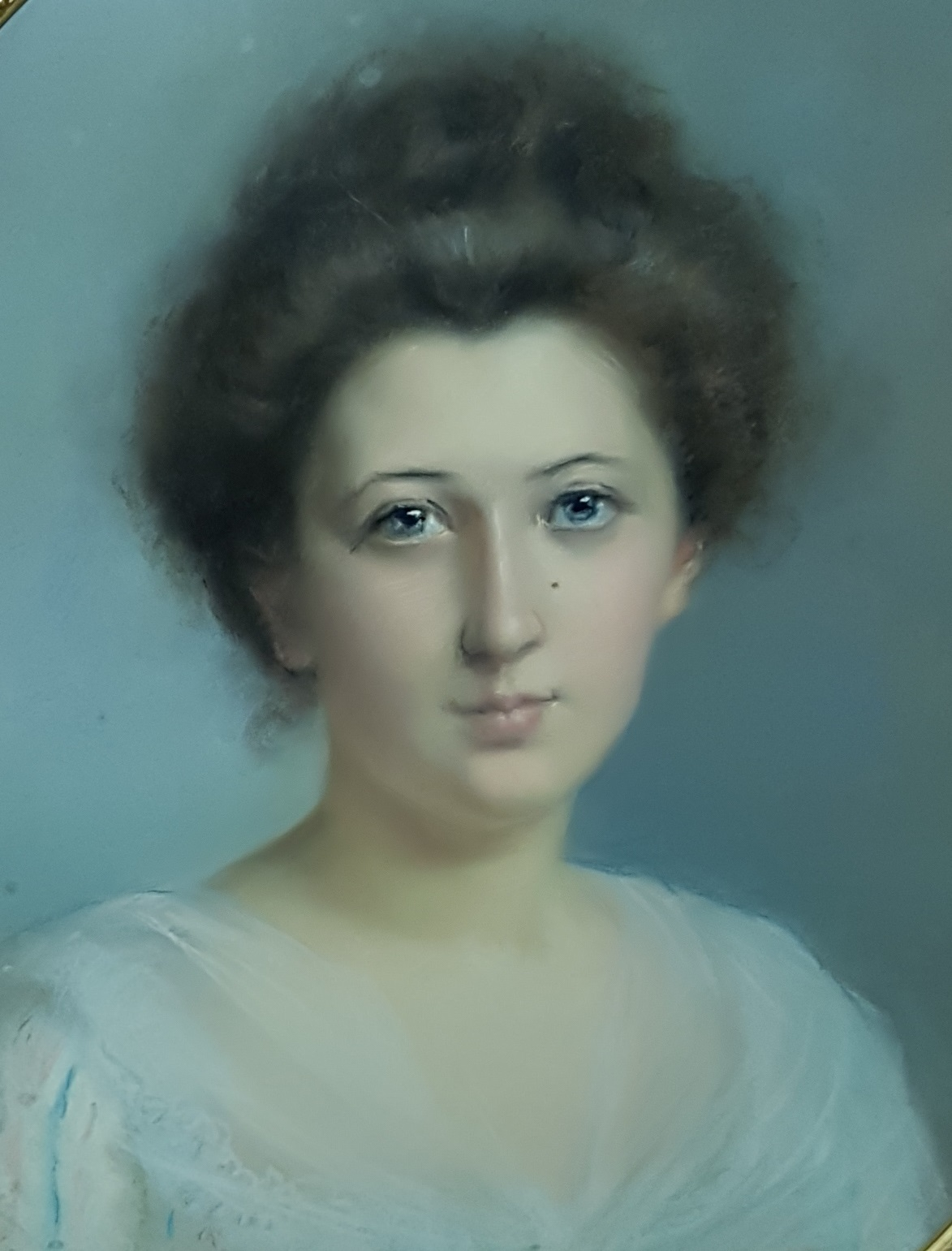
Madeleine Mulleur

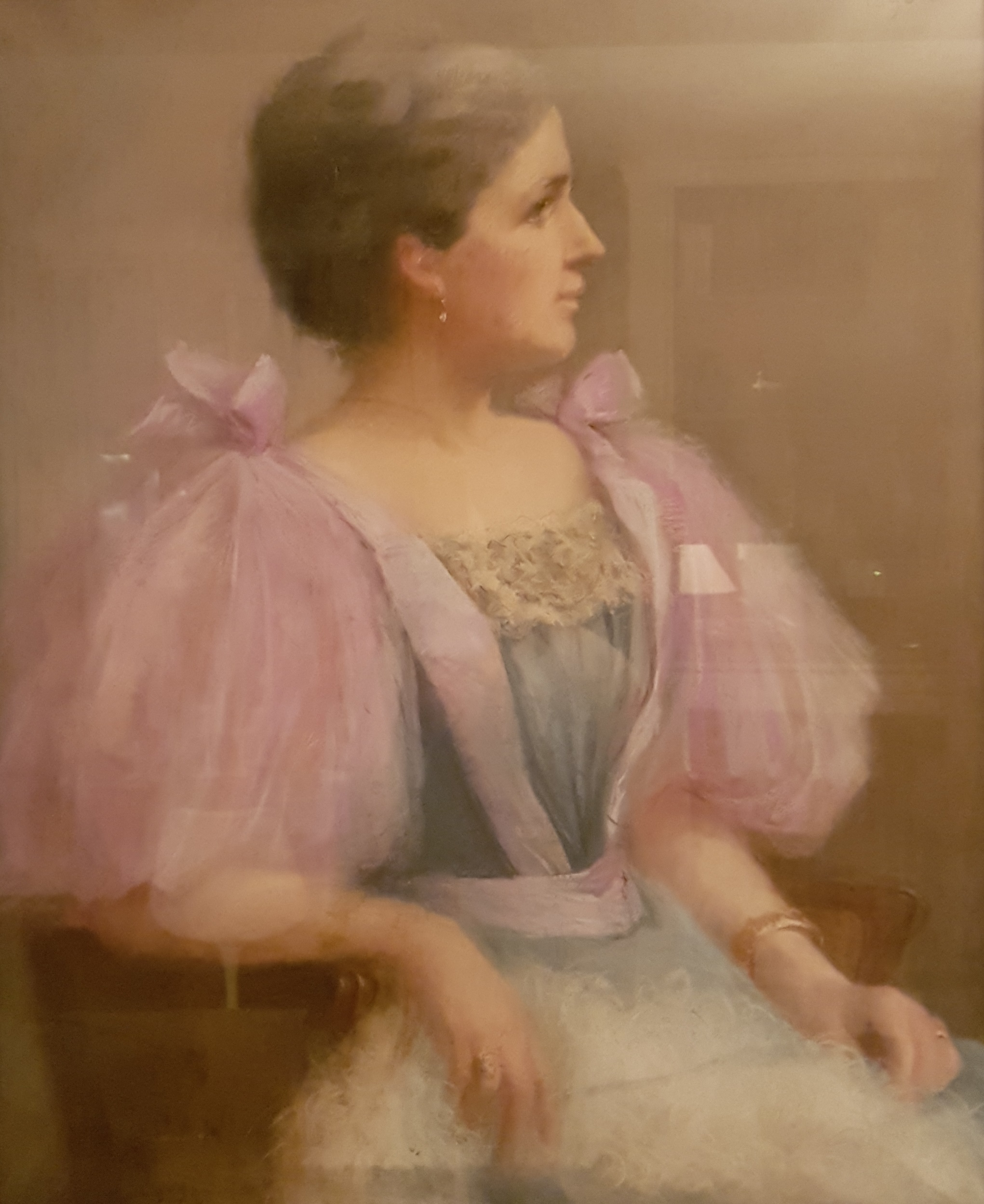
Camille Huet

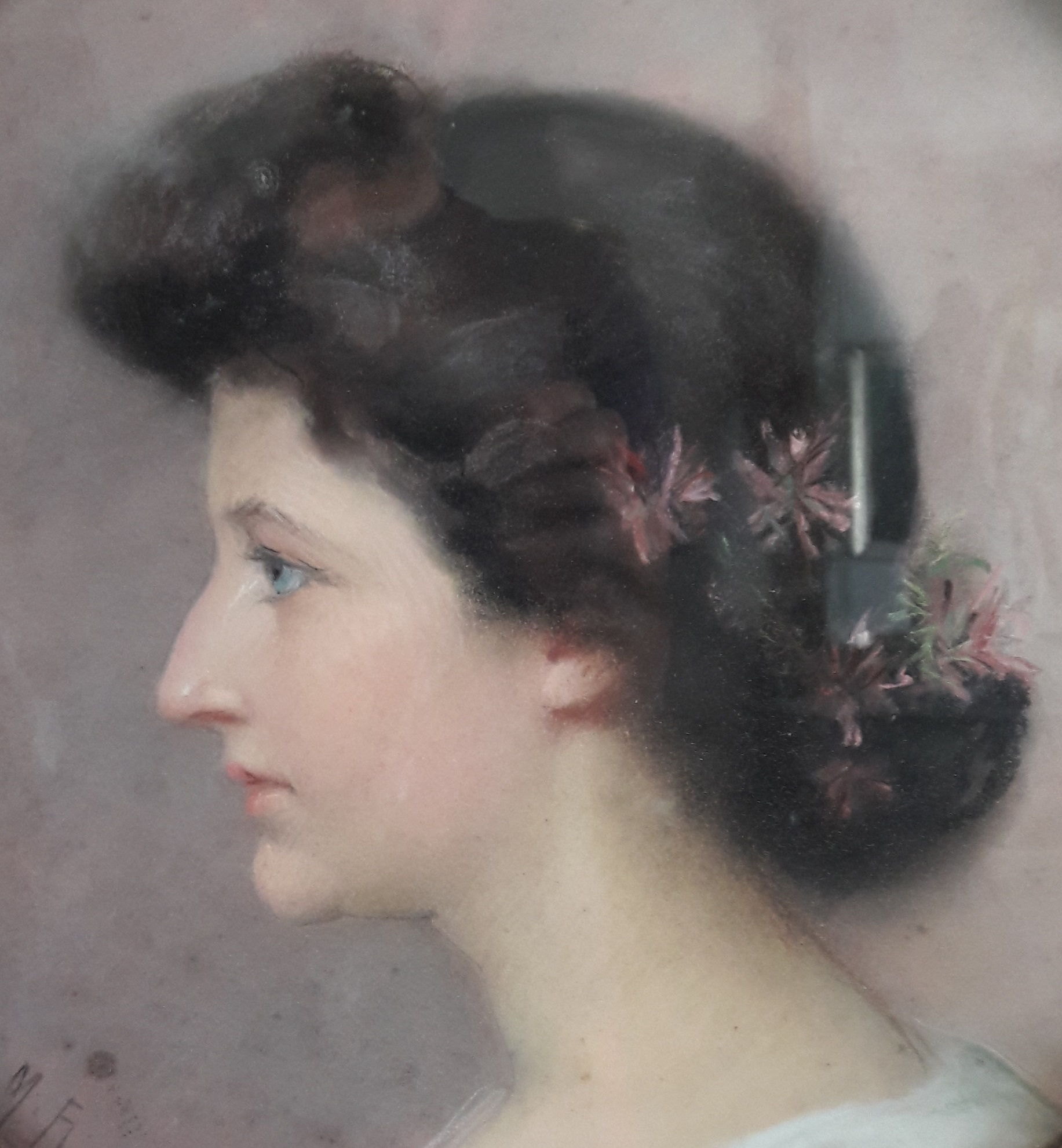
Madeleine Mulleur

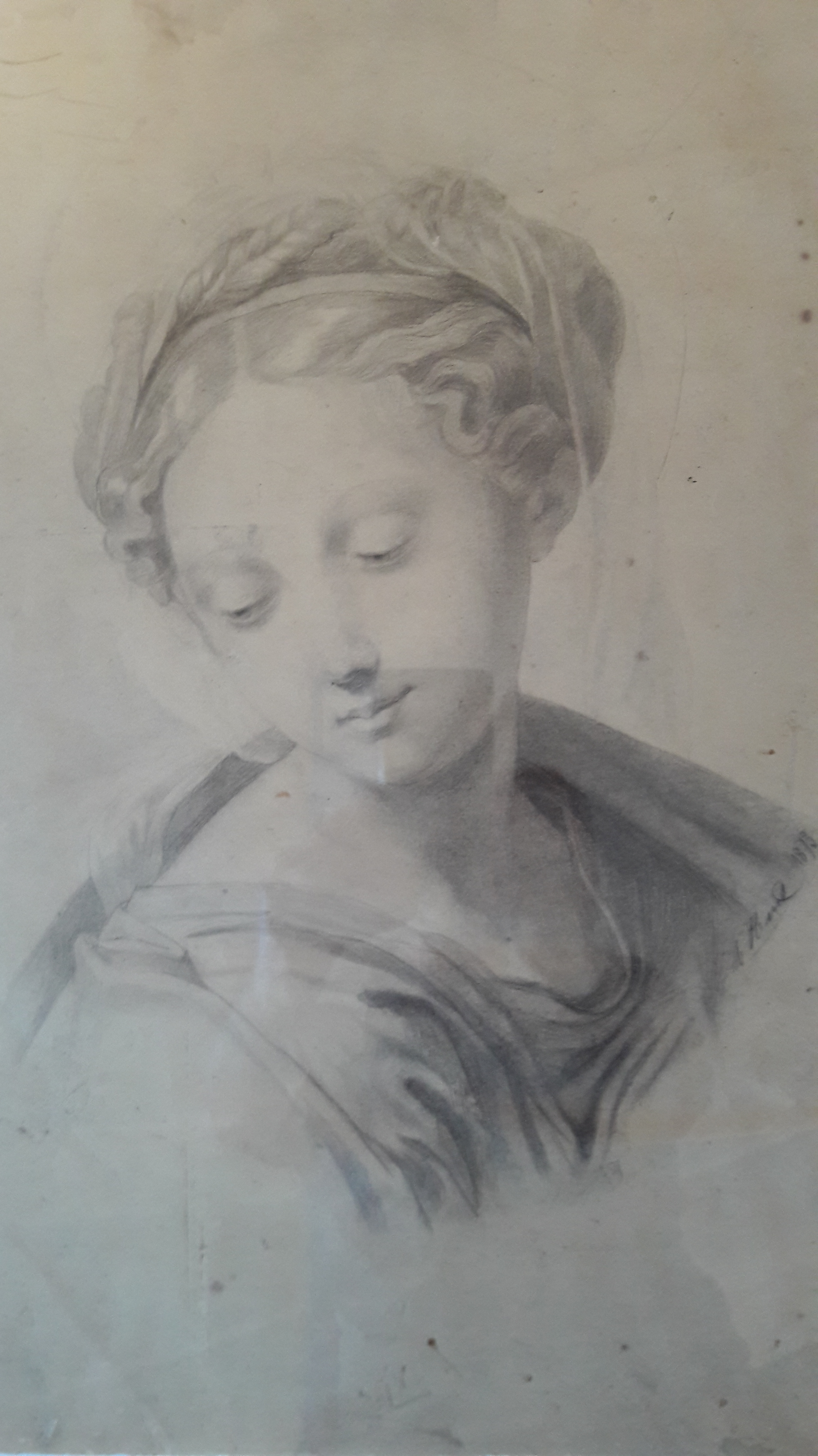

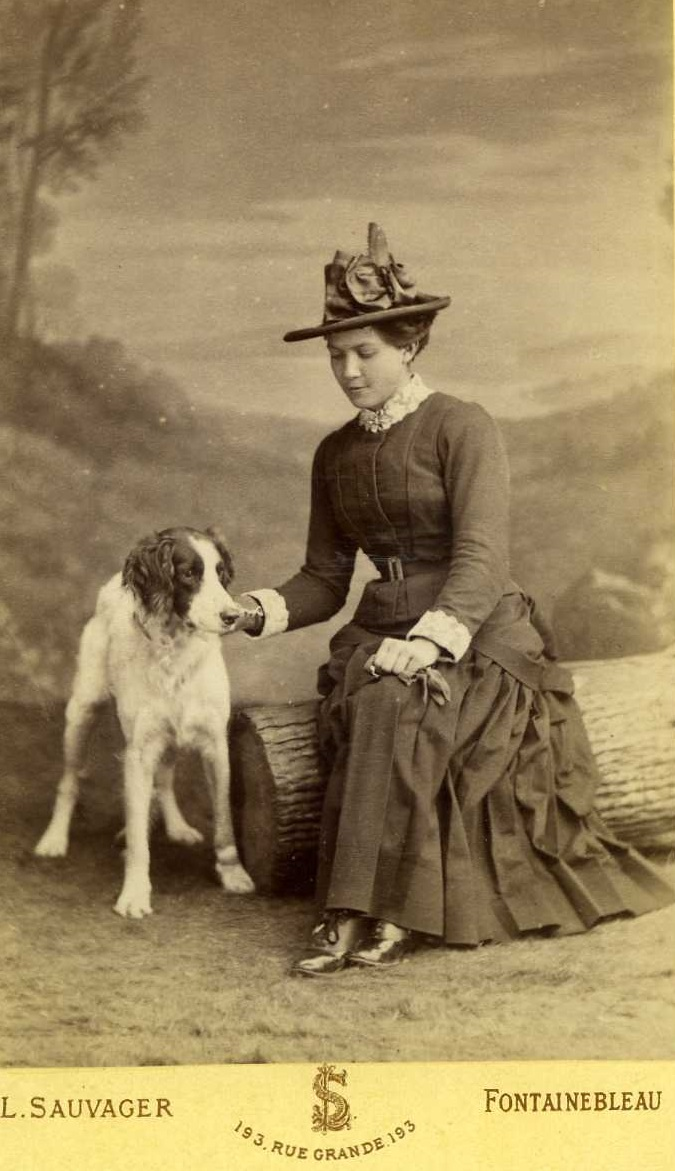
Marie Huet

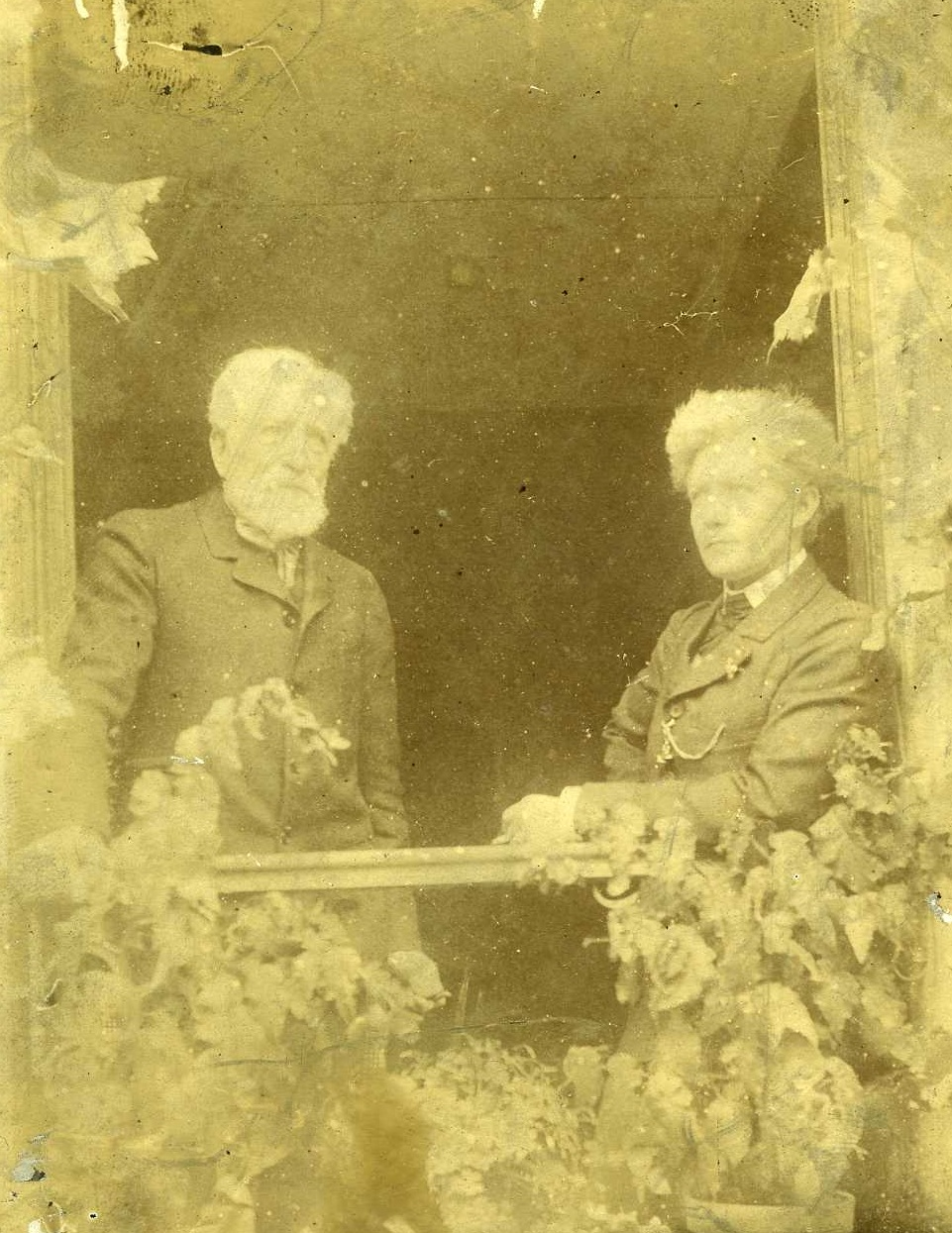
Marie Huet et son père à Thomery
