= Redfern (couture) =

British fashion house

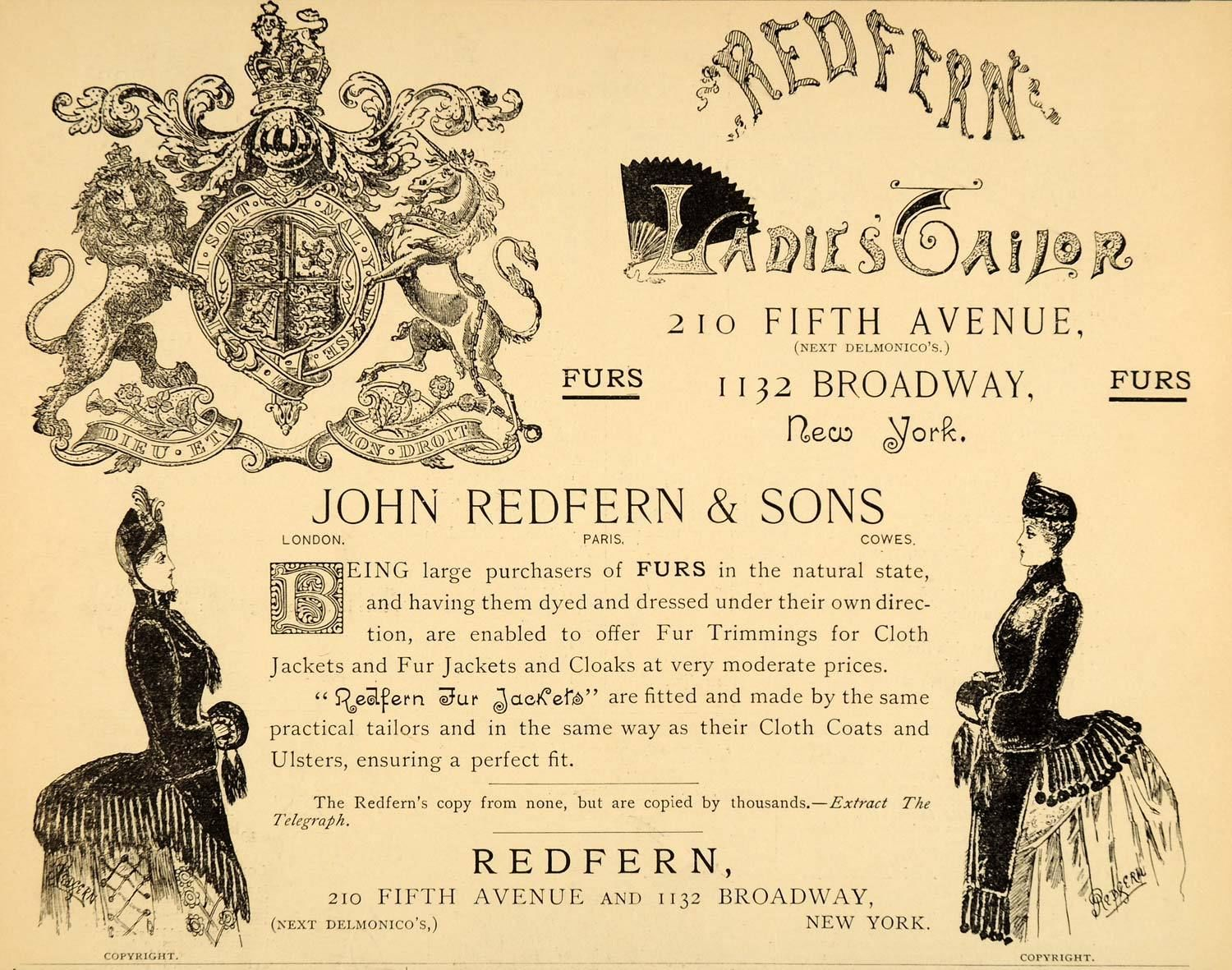
An 1885 advertisement for the New York branch of the English tailoring house of Redfern.

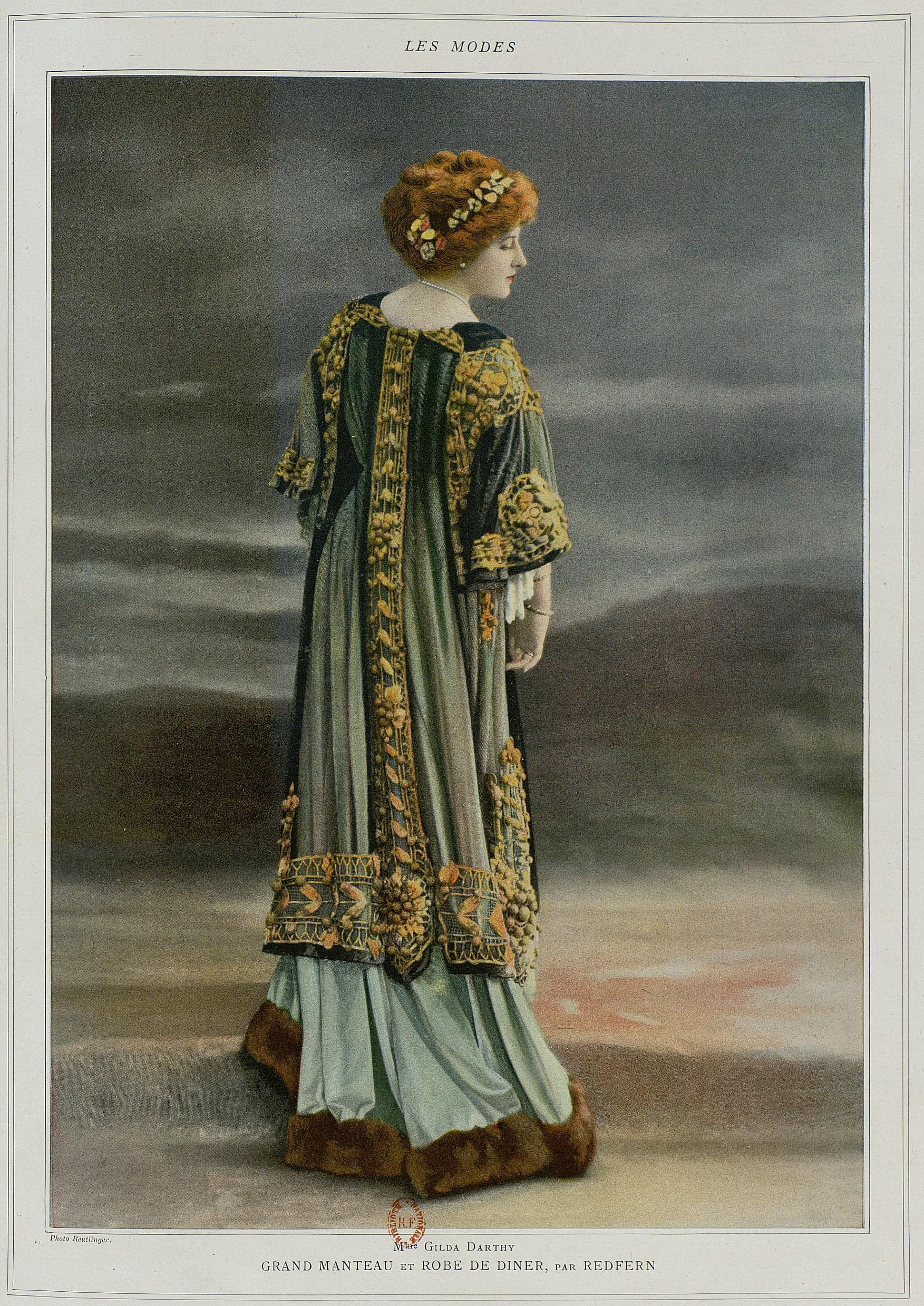
Gilda Darthy in a dinner dress and coat by Redfern, Les Modes, February 1908

Redfern & Sons (later Redfern Ltd) was a British tailoring firm founded by John Redfern (1820–1895) in Cowes on the Isle of Wight that developed into a leading European couture house (active: 1855–1932; 1936–1940). By the early 1890s, the business had branches in London, Edinburgh, Paris and New York City. The Paris extension was operated as a couture establishment while its other branches functioned primarily as tailors and importers.

== History ==
John Redfern (11 November 1820 – 22 November 1895) started out as a tailor in Cowes in 1855, following in the sartorial footsteps of his father, also John Redfern, who first opened a Cowes specialty clothing shop in 1811. With the support of sons Ernest Redfern and Charles Poynter Redfern (1853–1929), John Redfern opened tailoring houses in London and Paris in 1881, followed by two shops in New York in 1884–85, one for tailoring, the other for furs.

The Redferns are credited with making tailored clothing chic for women. Previously resigned to utilitarian wear, finely tailored dresses and suits, as introduced by Redfern, quickly became a craze among sporting aristocrats on holiday at Cowes, spreading soon to Paris. In the 1870s the Redfern yachting suit or dress was swiftly becoming the most recognizably English mode of fashionable apparel. In this way, the Redfern label was essentially the first high-end sportswear brand. By the early 1890s, due largely to the patronage of British and European royalty, Redfern's Paris house had developed into a full scale couture business. Ernest directed the London and New York branches, while Charles, and later, John Poynter Redfern, ran the Paris salon. From 1892, when Redfern's sons took control of the business, the house became known as Redfern Ltd.

The firm's American outlet, however, did not prove a success and was eventually partly sustained by a commercial sideline for ready-made corsets. The house in New York also did not function as a couture establishment but as an importer of other Parisian fashion brands which were sold alongside its own products. Like the Paris salon, the New York branch was originally advertised as a ladies' tailoring concern. The first English-based couturier to open full-scale American branches in the U.S. and to enjoy a lengthy success there was Lucile in the 1910s and '20s.

It was in 1871 that the house of Redfern first expanded its tailoring business to include the design and sale of silk dresses and mourning clothes. But it was tailored garments for women who rode, played tennis and went yachting that remained the Redfern specialty. Although intended for specific sporting pursuits, these tailored dresses and suits were increasingly adopted as everyday wear by influential Redfern clients. For example, in 1879 the house created a simple jersey traveling dress for Lillie Langtry, the noted beauty and actress popularly known as the "Jersey Lily," a name deriving from her birthplace in Jersey. The dress was widely copied and remained a favorite in the Redfern line for many years. In 1888, Redfern was formally named Dressmaker By Royal Appointment to Her Majesty the Queen and H.R.H. The Princess of Wales.

Redfern Ltd. was credited with helping popularize the high-waisted, so-called Grecian style of 1908. In the early 1910s, the house's designs were often illustrated in Gazette du Bon Ton along with six other leading Paris couturiers – Cheruit, Doeuillet, Doucet, Paquin, Poiret, and Worth. In 1916 Redfern created the first officially designated women's uniform for the Red Cross.

The Paris headquarters of Redfern closed in 1932, briefly reopened in 1936, and closed again in 1940.

== Gallery ==
Redfern designs as illustrated in La Gazette du Bon Ton, 1912–14.

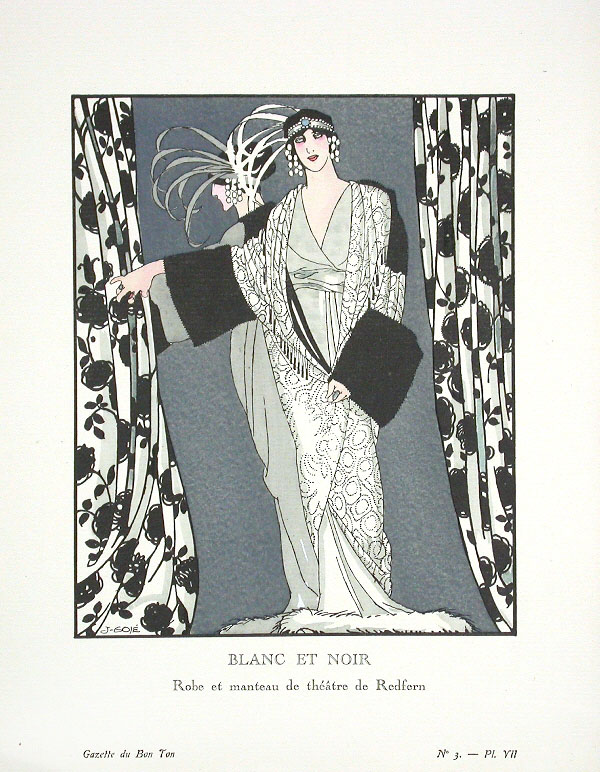
'Blanc et Noir'. Theatre coat. 1912–1913.

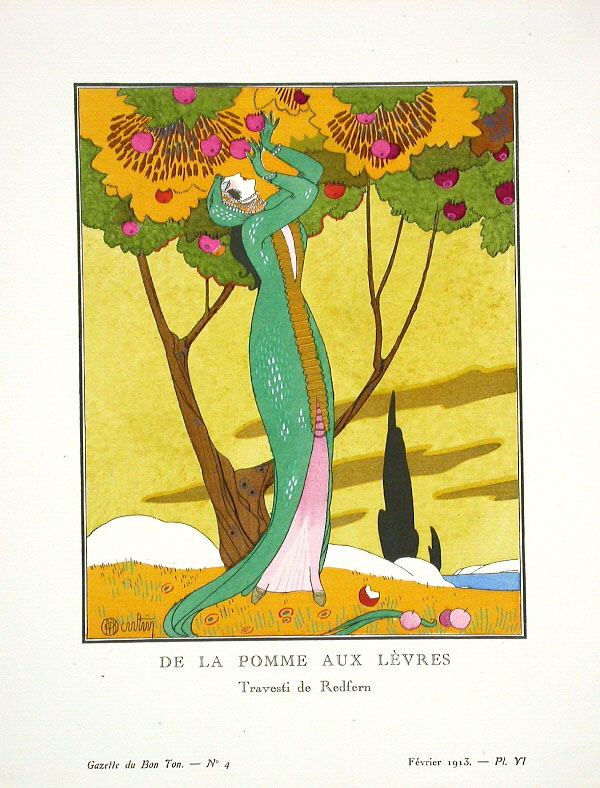
'De la Pomme aux Levres'. Serpent fancy-dress costume. February 1913

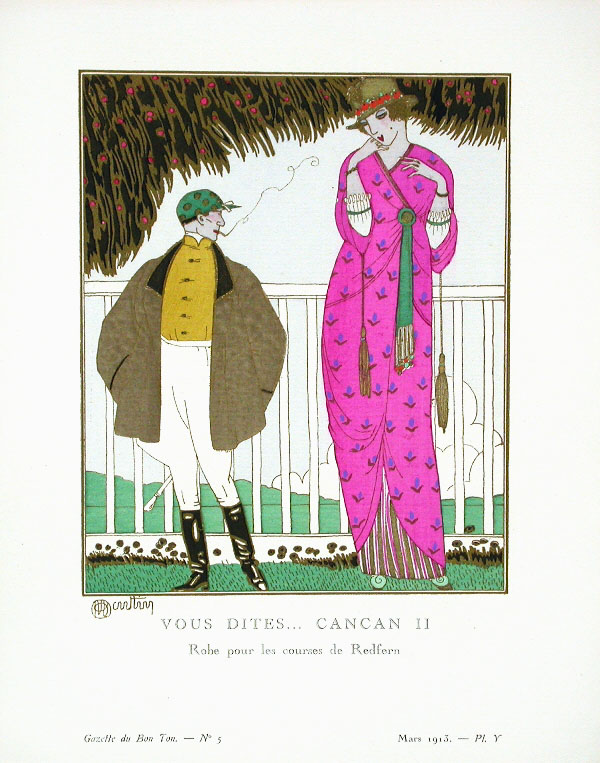
'Vous Dites... Cancan II'. Dress for the races. March 1913

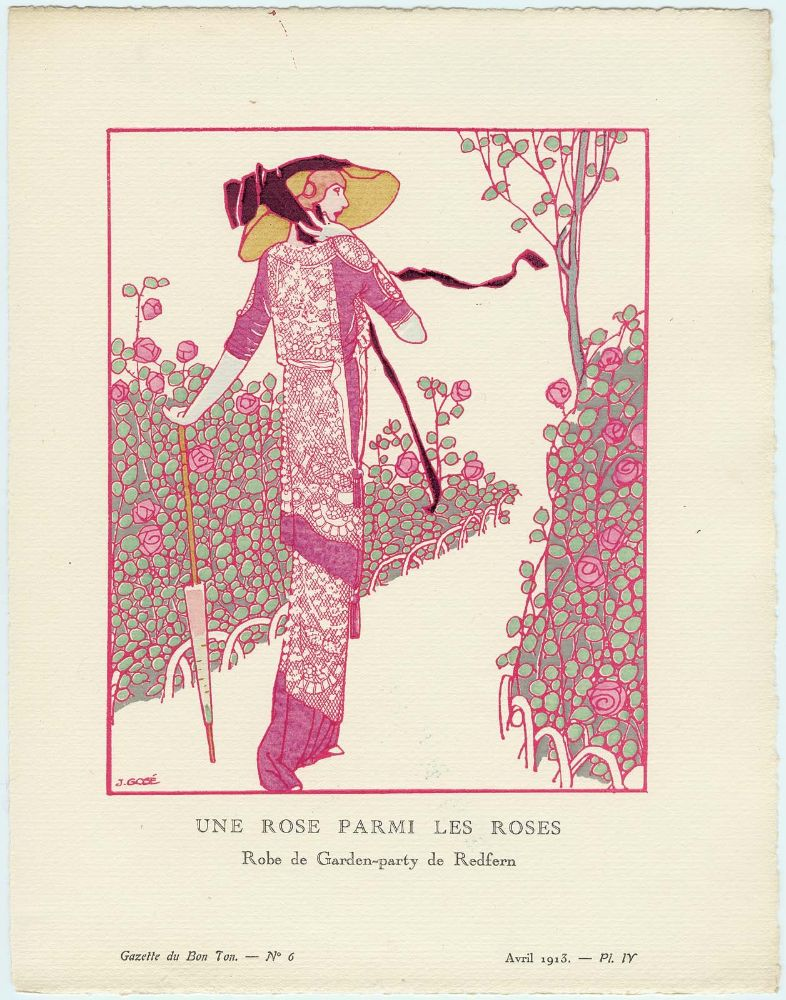
'Une Rose Parmi Les Roses'. Garden-party dress. April 1913

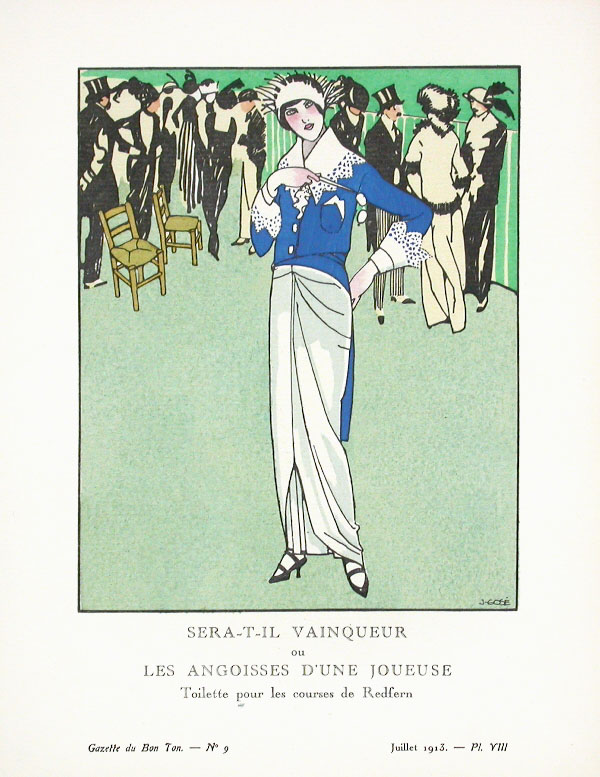
'Sera-t-Il Vainqueur, ou Les Angoisses d'une Joueuse' Suit for the races, July 1913

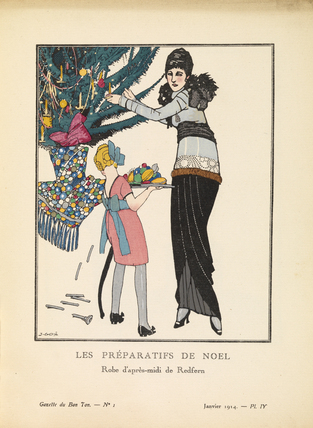
'Les Préparatifs de Noel'. Afternoon dress. January 1914

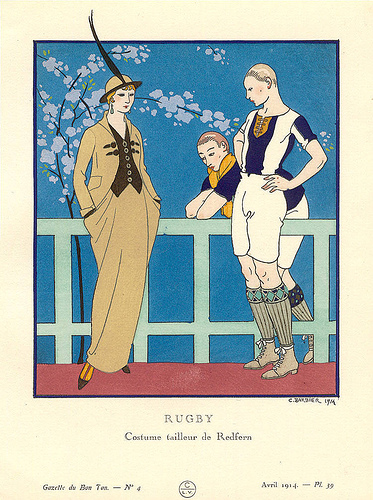
'Rugby'. Hobble-skirted suit. April 1914
