= Jacques Doucet (fashion designer) =

French fashion designer and art collector (1853–1929)

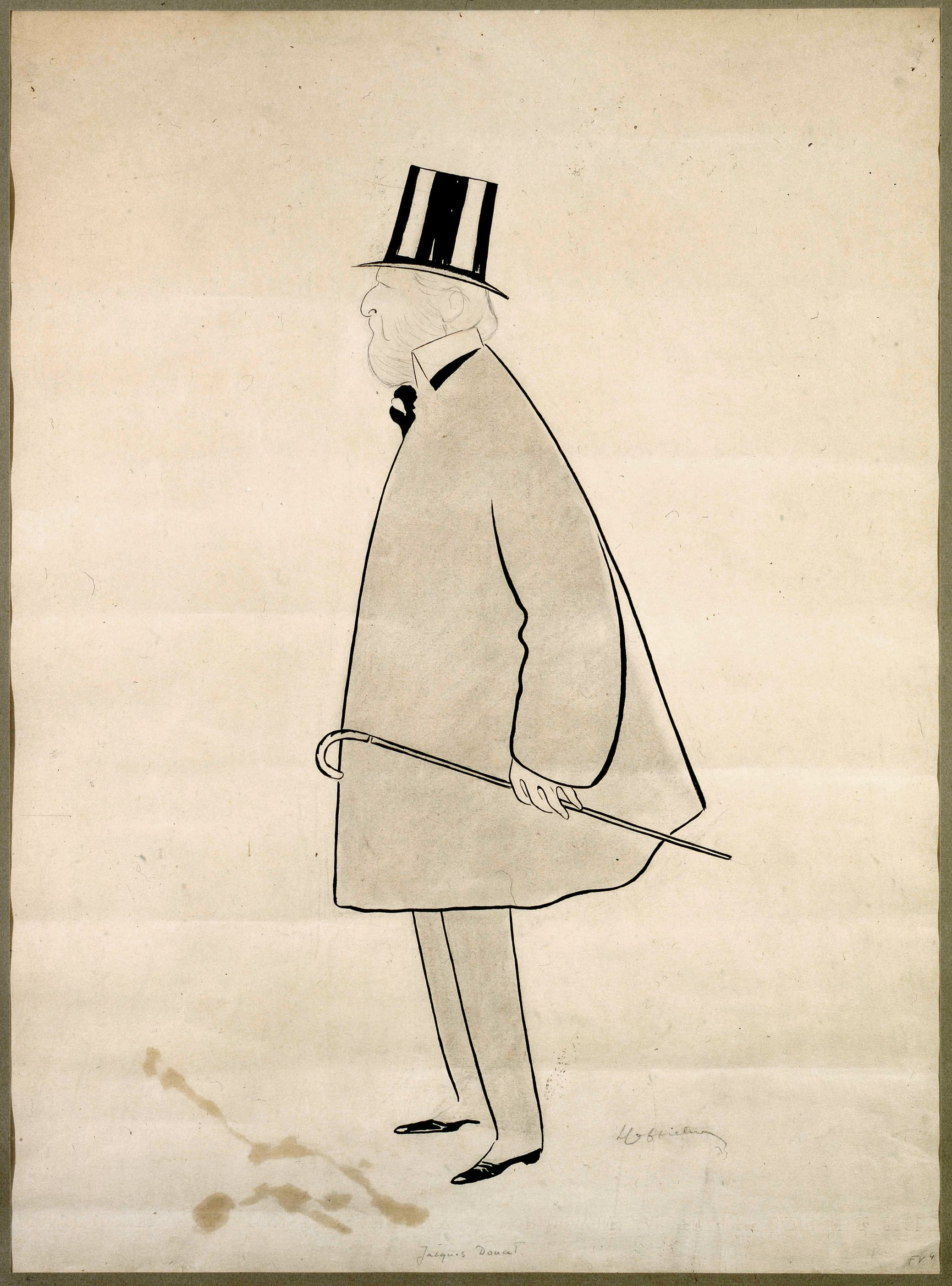
Jacques Doucet in 1903, by Leonetto Cappiello

Jacques Doucet (French pronunciation: [ʒak dusɛ]; 1853–1929) was a French fashion designer and art collector. He is known for his elegant dresses, made with flimsy translucent materials in superimposing pastel colors.

== Life ==
Doucet was born in Paris in 1853 to a prosperous family whose lingerie and linens business, Doucet Lingerie, had flourished in the Rue de la Paix since 1816. In 1871, Doucet opened a salon selling ladies' apparel. An enthusiastic collector of eighteenth-century furniture, objets d'art, paintings, and sculptures, many of his gowns were strongly influenced by this opulent era. Beginning in 1912, the fashions of Jacques Doucet were illustrated in the fashion magazine La Gazette du Bon Ton with six other leading Paris designers of the day – Louise Chéruit, Georges Doeuillet, Jeanne Paquin, Paul Poiret, Redfern & Sons, and the House of Charles Worth. His most original designs were those he created for actresses at the time. Cécile Sorel, Rejane and Sarah Bernhardt (for whom he designed her famous white costume in L'Aiglon) all often wore his outfits, both on and off the stage. For the aforementioned actresses he reserved a particular style, one which consisted of frills, sinuous curving lines and lace ruffles that reflected the colors of faded flowers. Doucet was a designer of taste and discrimination who valued dignity and luxury above novelty and practicality, and gradually faded from popularity during the 1920s.

A collection of dresses from 1923

Several years after World War I, in 1927, Cubists Joseph Csaky, Jacques Lipchitz, Louis Marcoussis, Henri Laurens, the sculptor Gustave Miklos, and others collaborated in the decoration of a studio house, rue Saint-James, Neuilly-sur-Seine. The hôtel particulier, owned by Doucet was designed by the architect Paul Ruaud. Laurens designed the fountain, Csaky designed Doucet's staircase, Lipchitz made the fireplace mantel and Marcoussis created a Cubist rug.

== Legacy ==
A collector of art and literature throughout his life, by the time of his death he had a collection of Post-Impressionist and Cubist paintings, including Les Demoiselles d'Avignon, which he bought directly from Picasso's studio, as well as two major book collections which he donated to the French nation. Doucet's collection of art books and research, which he gave to the University of Paris in 1917, became the core of the university's Institut d'Art et d'Archéologie and was eventually transferred to the Institut National d'Histoire de l'Art in 2003. At his death in 1929, his collection of manuscripts by contemporary writers for which the university created in his honour the Bibliothèque littéraire Jacques-Doucet. Francois Chapon wrote a book titled C'etait Jacques Doucet about the life and work of the fashion designer.

Dresses designed by Doucet

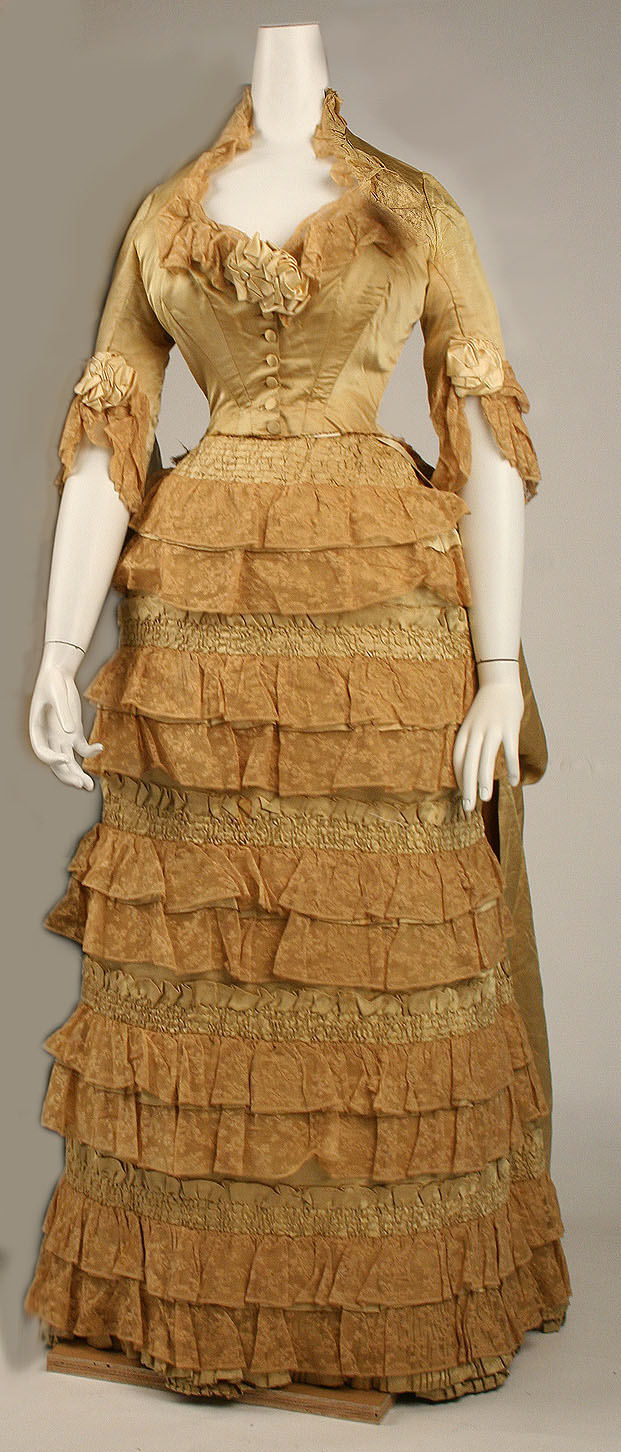
Dress, 1880s

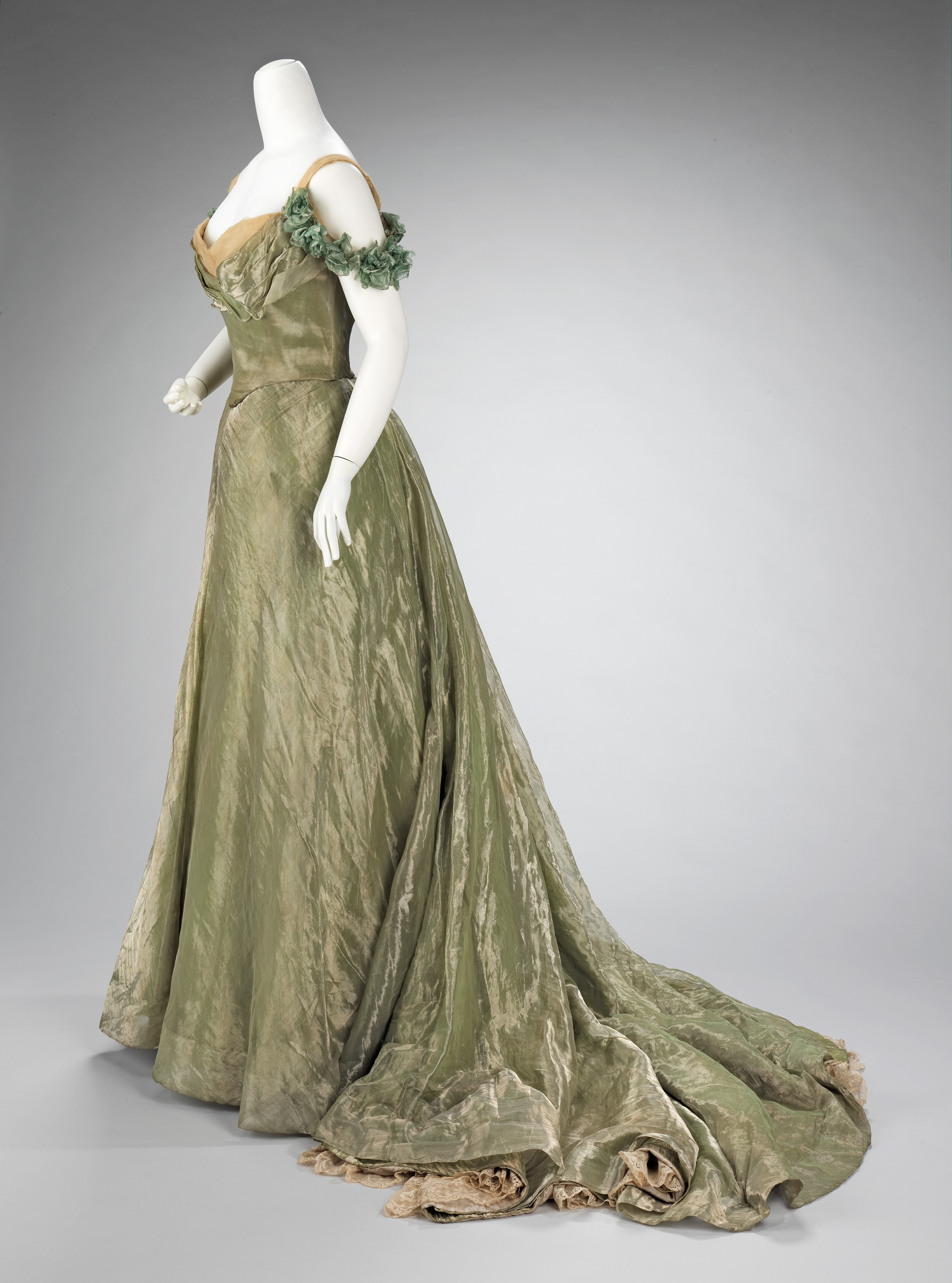
Ball gown, 1898–1900

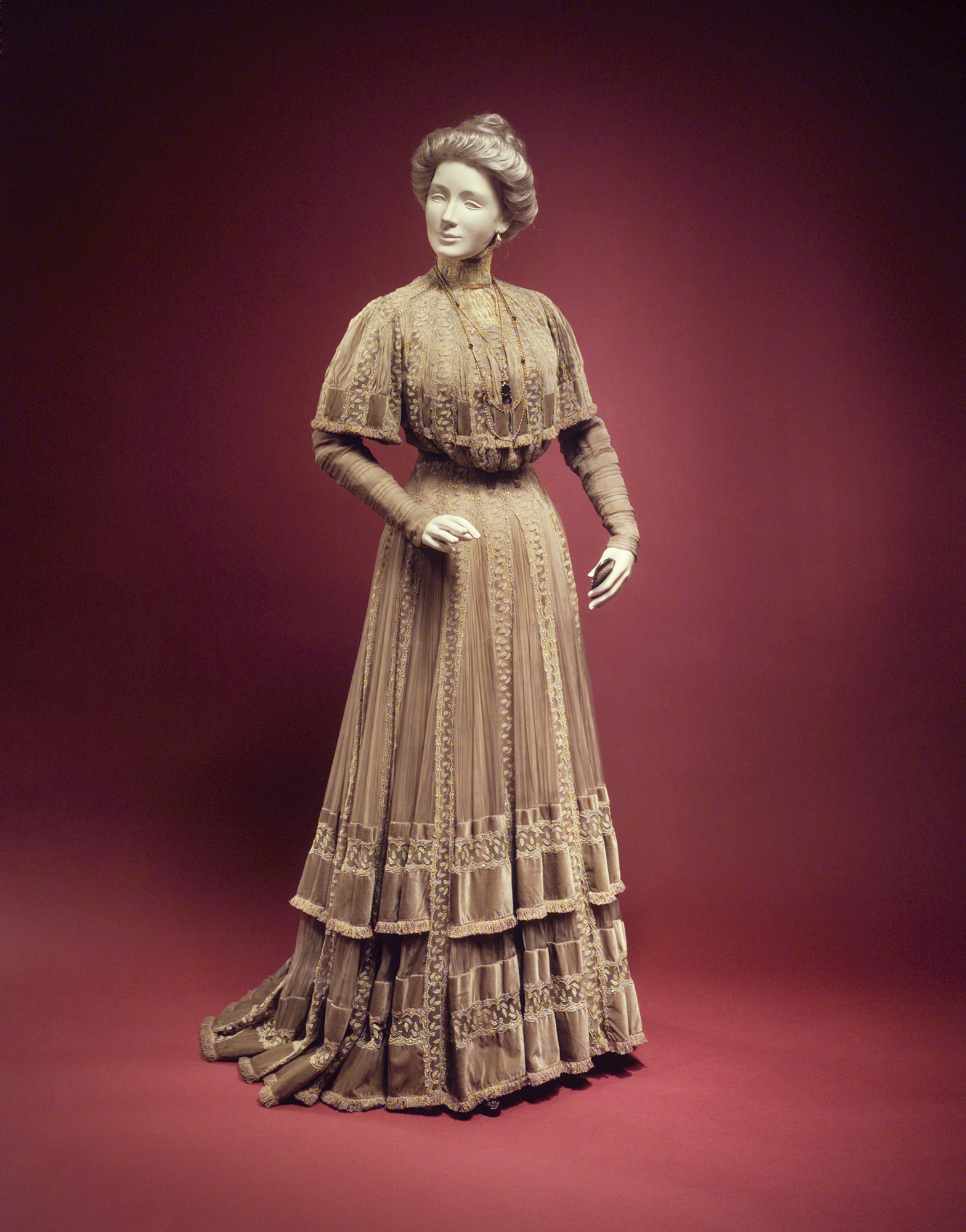
Afternoon dress, ca 1903

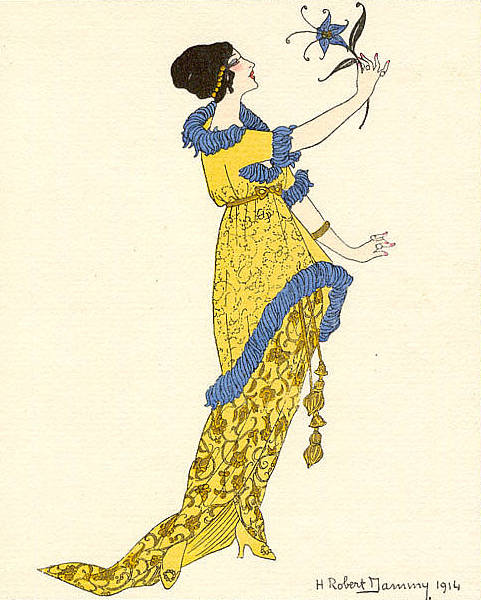
Dress, 1914

Suit, 1915

Dress, 1917

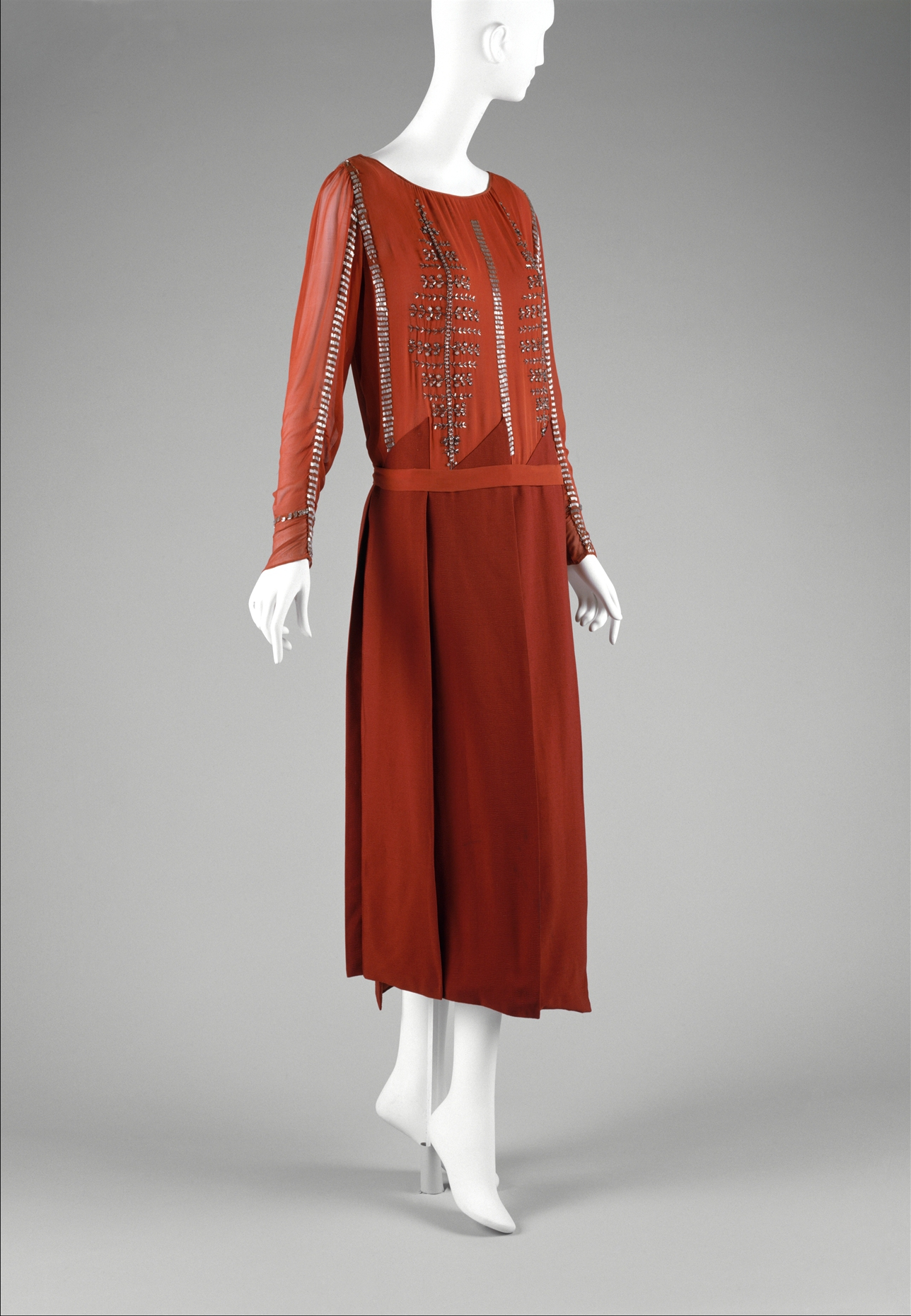
Day Dress, 1920–1923
Jacques Doucet's hôtel particulier

Jacques Doucet's hôtel particulier, 33 rue Saint-James, Neuilly-sur-Seine, 1929.

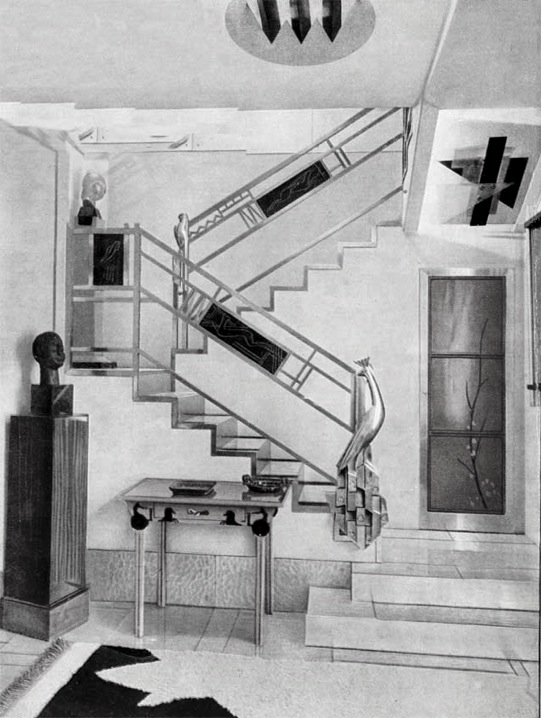
Jacques Doucet's hôtel particulier, 33 rue Saint-James, Neuilly-sur-Seine, 1929.
