= Louise Chéruit =

French fashion designer

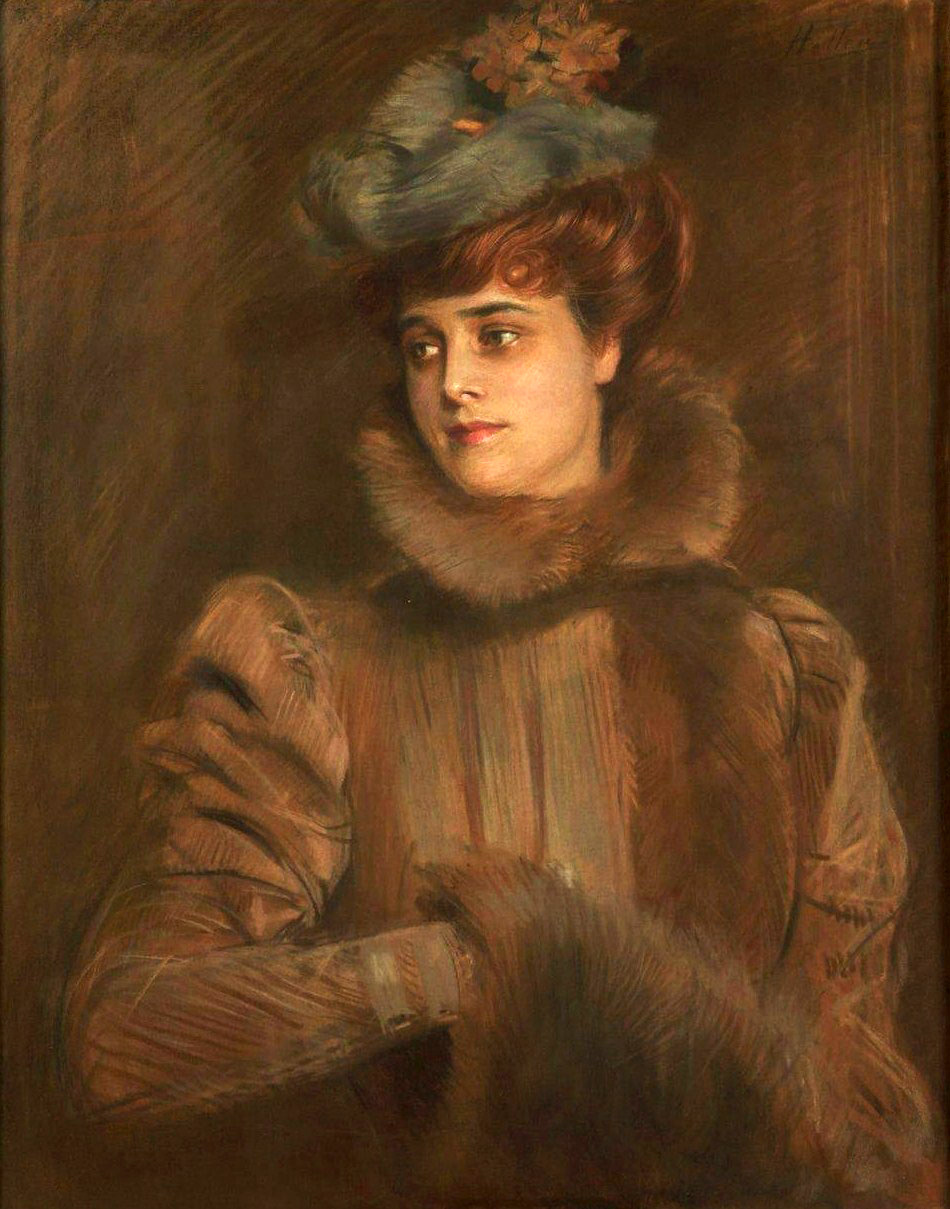
- Portrait de Madame Chéruit, by Paul César Helleu, 1898
- Born: Louise Lemaire; 1866
- Died: 1955 (aged 88–89)
- Occupation: Fashion designer
- Spouse: Prosper Chéruit

Signature
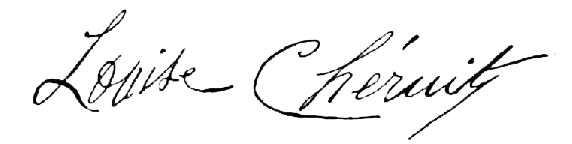

Louise Chéruit (née Lemaire; 1866–1955), also known as Madame Chéruit and often erroneously called Madeleine Chéruit, was a French fashion designer. She was among the foremost couturiers of her generation, and one of the first women to control a major French fashion house. Her salon operated at Place Vendôme in Paris under the name Chéruit (French pronunciation: [ʃeʁi]) from 1906 to 1935. She is best remembered today as the subject of a number of portraits by Paul César Helleu (with whom she conducted an affair before opening her couture house) and for the appearance of her name in two celebrated works of literature, Marcel Proust's Remembrance of Things Past (1910) and Evelyn Waugh's Vile Bodies (1930). Her name is also frequently associated with the fashion photography of Edward Steichen, whose favorite model, Marion Morehouse, often wore gowns from the house of Chéruit for Vogue magazine in the 1920s. One particular Steichen image has become iconic – Morehouse in a jet-beaded black net Chéruit dress, first published in 1927.

== Early life ==
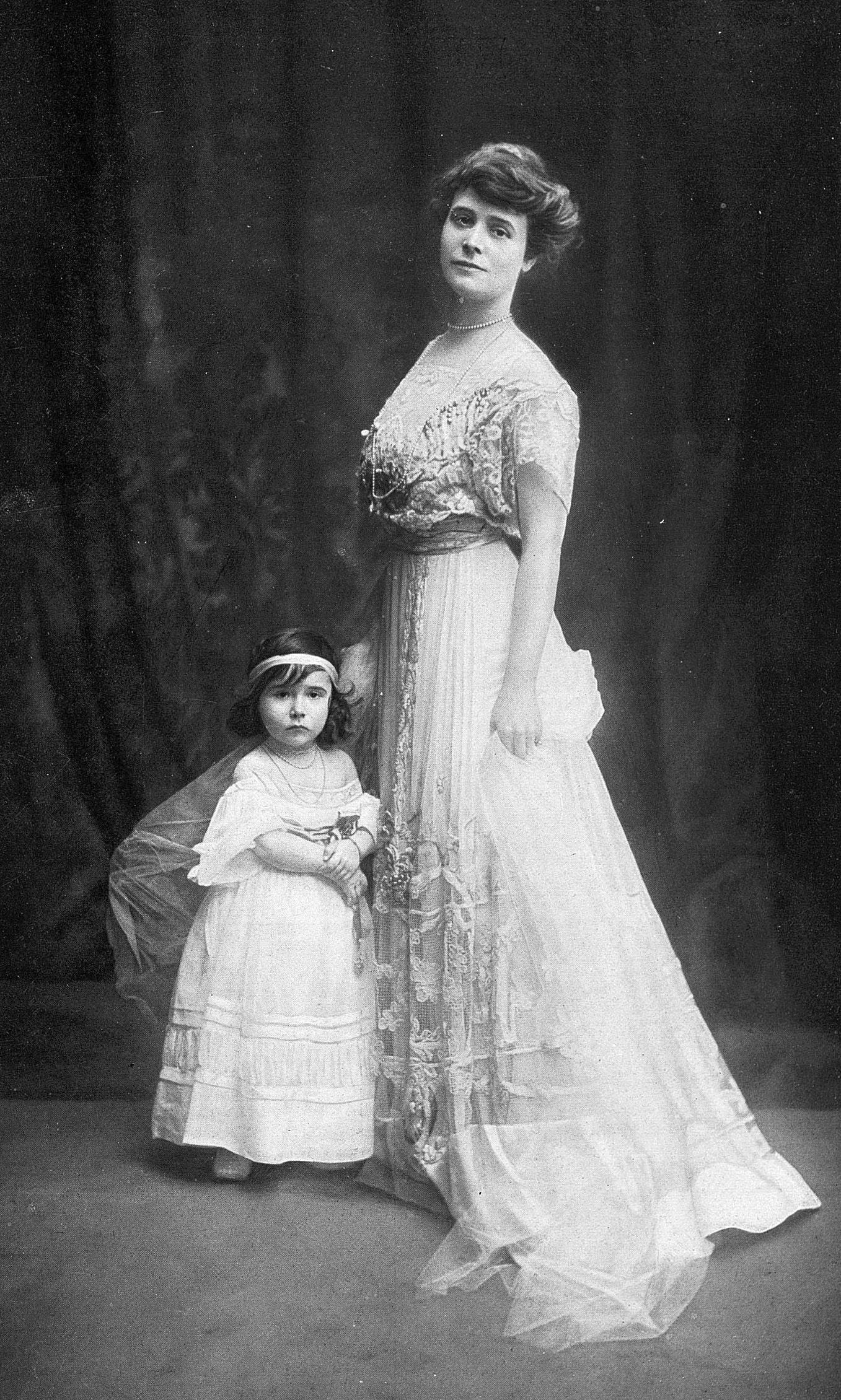
Chéruit with her daughter, 1907

Many basic facts about the life of Chéruit are uncertain, although recent research shows that her forename was not Madeleine, as so many traditional fashion resources claim. According to the Carnavalet Museum, she was born as Louise Lemaire on 9 June 1866. Vogue magazine described her as "a Louis XVI woman because she has the daintiness, the extravagant tastes, the exquisite charm, and the art of those French ladies who went gaily through the pre-revolution epoch."

Her mother was a seamstress and she received her early professional training in dressmaking during the late 1880s with Raudnitz & Cie, located in the heart of Paris. The salon especially appealed to women who wanted ensembles that exuded an air of youthfulness and simplicity, made of the finest fabrics. Her talent, alongside that of her sister Marie Huet, was such that they ascended to leading positions within the firm. On 28 August 1895, she married Prosper Chéruit, who supported her creative talents and contributed to some business aspects of her early career.

Mme Chéruit notably helped launch the career of Paul Poiret, one of the early twentieth century's most visionary designers, by buying a collection of twelve of his first designs in 1898. By 1900, labels sewn into clothes created at Raudnitz bore the words Raudnitz & Cie, Huet & Chéruit Srs., 21, Place Vendôme, Paris – with the names of the sisters in more prominent type. By 1905, the firm's labels read Huet & Chéruit, Anc.ne Mon. Raudnitz & Cie (French for 'Huet and Chéruit, formerly Mr. Raudnitz and Co.').

== 1906–1914 ==
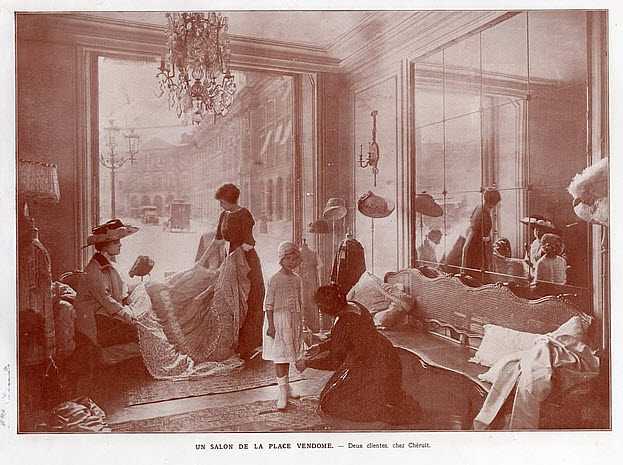
Main showroom at Chéruit in Paris, 1910

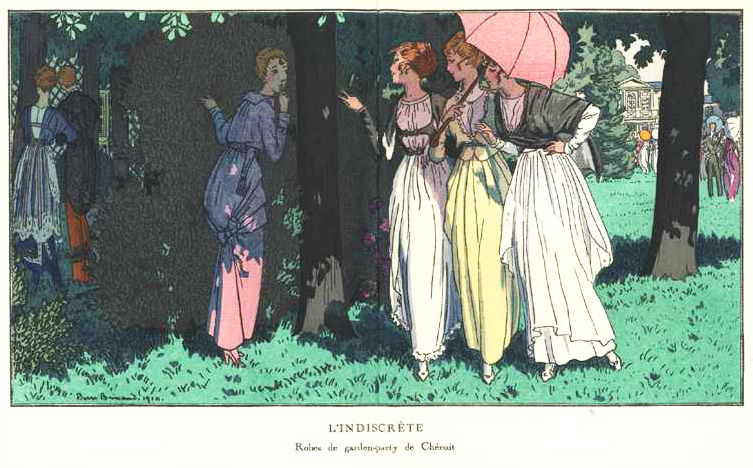
Garden party dresses designed by Chéruit, published in La Gazette du Bon Ton, 1914

In 1906, the fashion house with its more than 100 employees became her own, and it was rechristened as 'Chéruit'. The salon occupied the distinguished hôtel de Fontpertuis on Place Vendôme, built in the 17th century by Pierre Bullet. Cheruit commissioned an architect to expand the premises to serve her growing clientele. By 1910, Chéruit was one of the most celebrated designers in Paris, the unveiling of her latest collections closely followed by the press, her image drawn by leading artists, and her name mentioned by the ubiquitous Marcel Proust in his Remembrance of Things Past.

As one of the leaders of French style, Chéruit and her house of couture took fashion from the Belle Époque through the Jazz Age. In 1910, one reporter wrote glowingly, "With taste, so original, so fine, and so personal, Madame Chéruit has placed her house of fashion at the first rank, not only in Paris, but in the entire world." During her career, Chéruit refined for her aristocratic clientele the creative excesses of some of her contemporaries, offering soft, feminine, richly ornamented dresses which helped transition the couture industry from the glamour of high fashion to the reality of ready-to-wear.

In 1912, Chéruit signed a contract to collaborate with Lucien Vogel to produce the fashion magazine La Gazette du Bon Ton. Six other top Paris designers – Georges Doeuillet, Jacques Doucet, Jeanne Paquin, Paul Poiret, Redfern, and the House of Worth – joined the project. Vogel hired leading Art Deco artists to fill the journal's pages with striking illustrations of the designers' fashions, along with essays by noted writers. The magazine printed images on fine papers using the expensive pochoir technique, making it a truly exclusive venue for showcasing the couturiers' latest designs. Chéruit had a special affection for the artistic style of Pierre Brissaud, and he created most of the illustrations of her work that appeared in the pages of La Gazette du Bon Ton.

Chéruit's aesthetic was traditionally feminine, incorporating soft fabrics, pastel colors and rare embroideries, but she was innovative in line and cut. In late 1911, she introduced the pannier gown, full at the hips and tapering to an ankle-length hem, which recalled French court fashions of the 18th century. Delicate evening dresses may have been her forte, but she was also adept at elegant street wear, and by 1914, her walking suits and afternoon gowns were fashion staples.

== Chéruit fashions, 1912–1914 ==
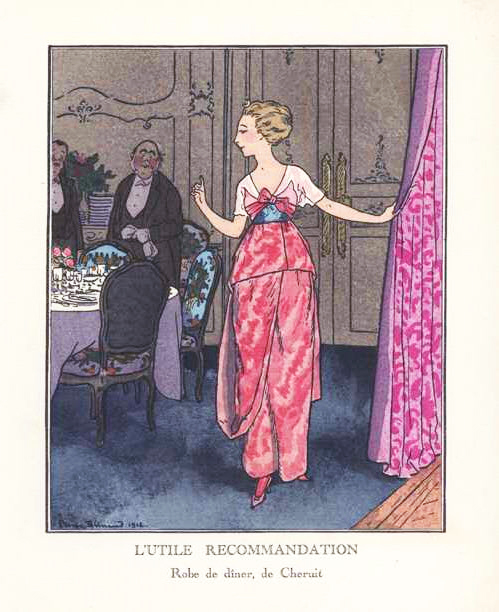
A dinner dress, 1912

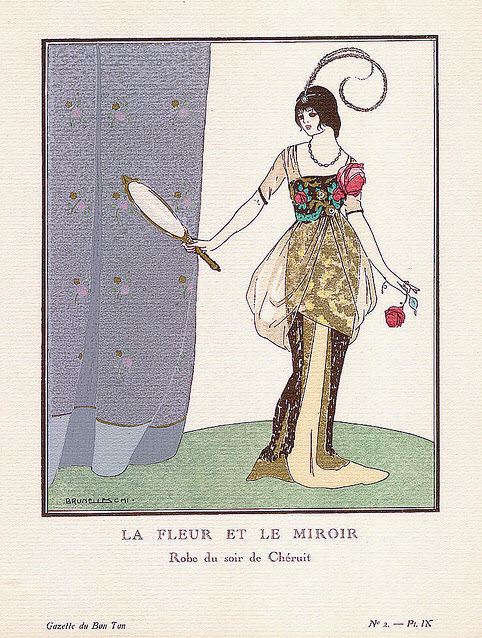
An evening dress, 1912

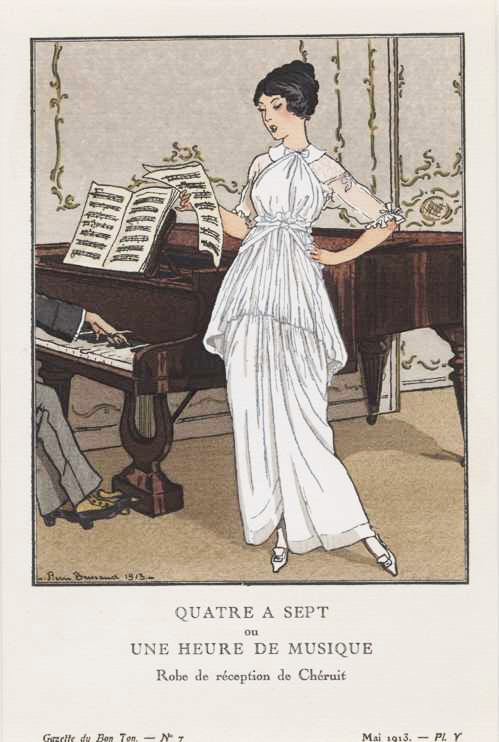
A reception dress, 1913

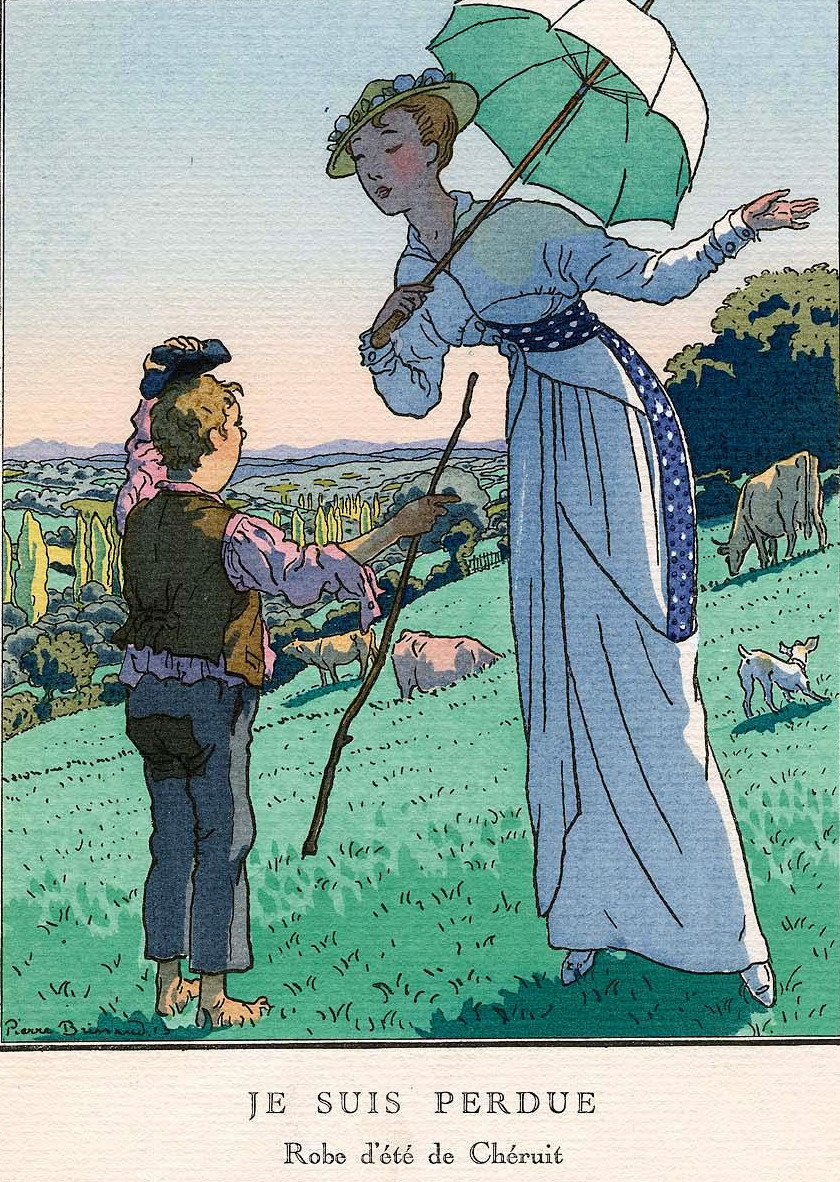
A summer dress, 1913

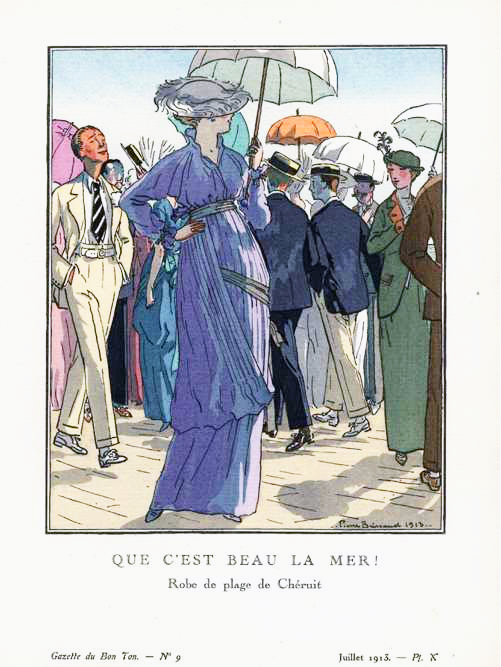
A dress for the beach, 1913

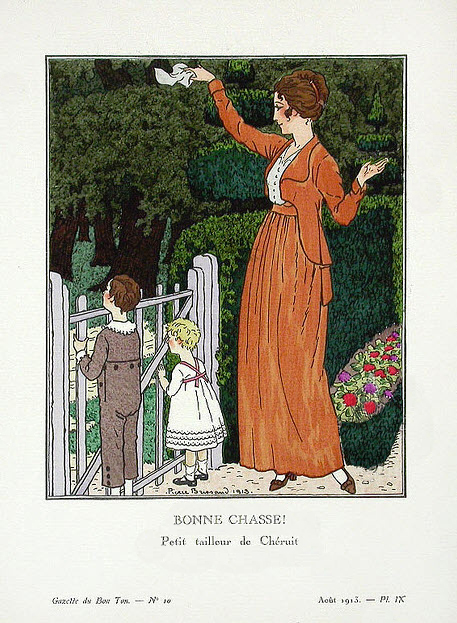
Mother and children, 1913

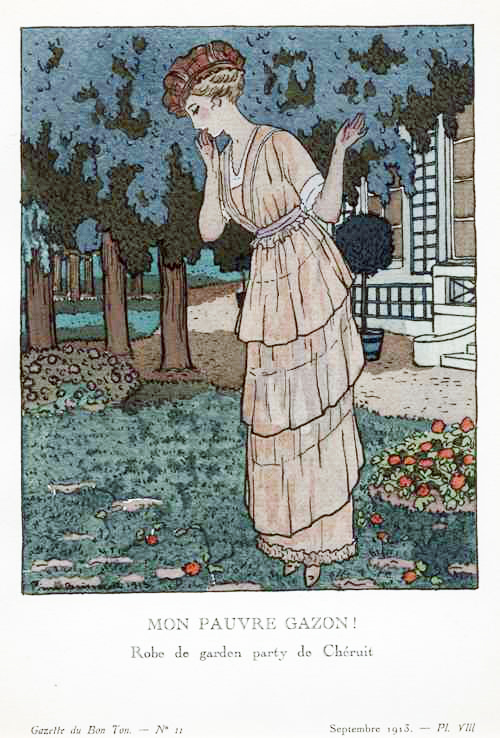
A garden party dress, 1913

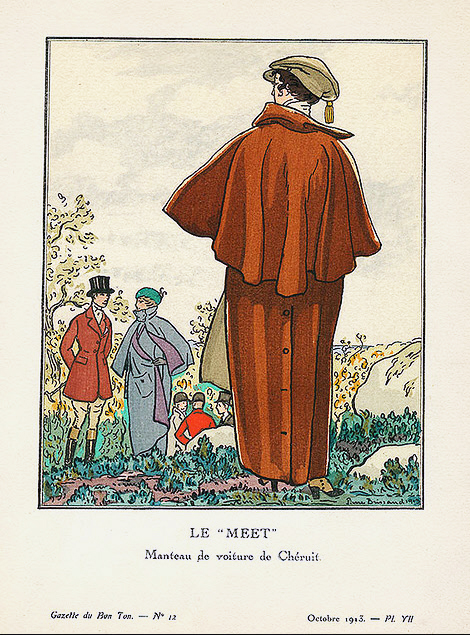
An automobile coat, 1913

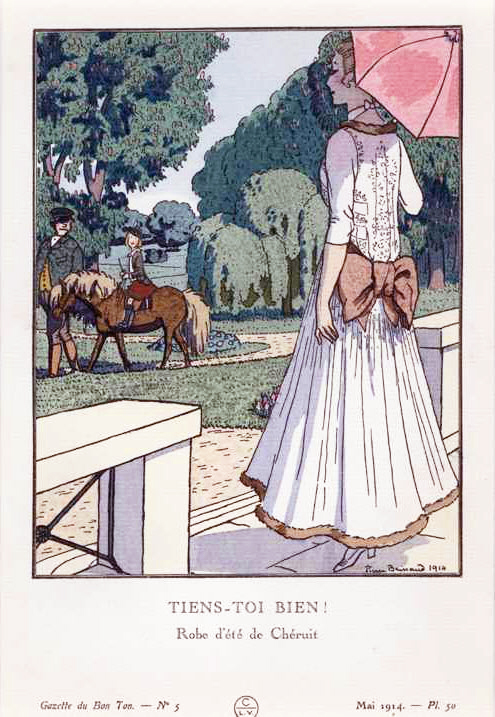
A summer dress, 1914

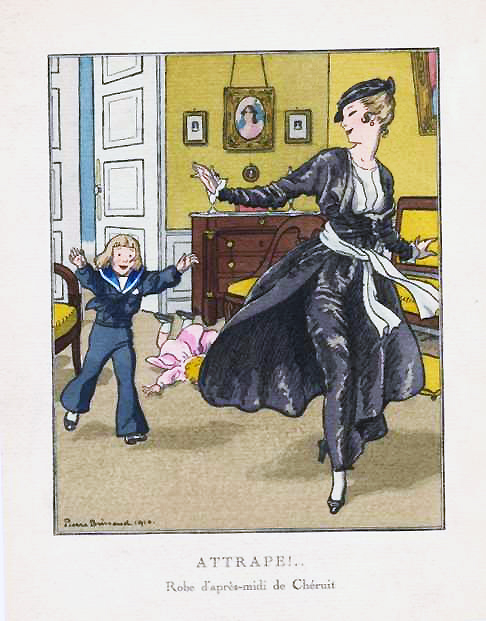
An afternoon dress, 1914

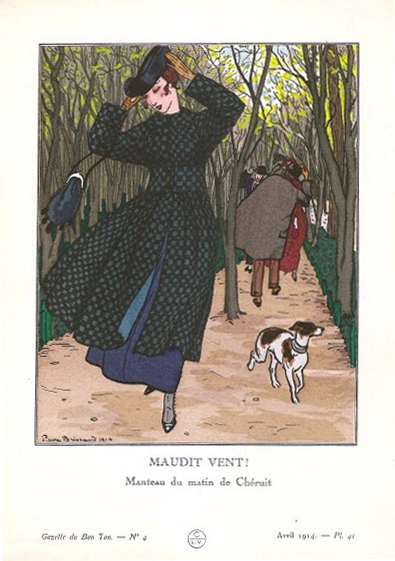
A morning coat, 1914

== World War I and the 1920s ==
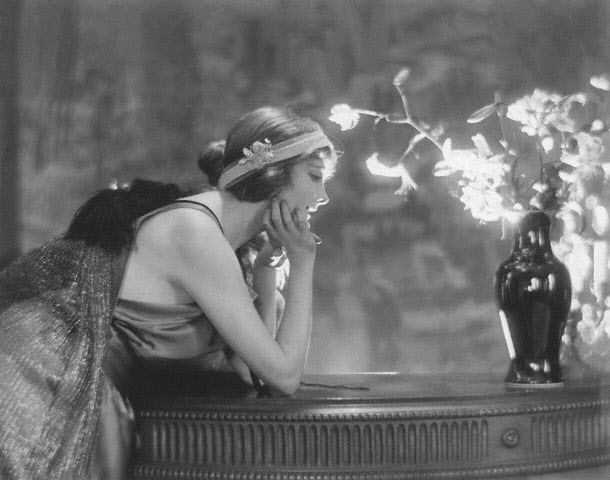
Actress Jeanne Eagels modeling a dress and cape by Chéruit, 1921

When World War I struck, most Paris fashion houses shut down or reduced production, but Chéruit remained fully operational. However, in 1914, following a scandal involving her lover, an Austrian nobleman and military officer who was accused of espionage, Cheruit was forced into seclusion, a startling end to her enormous celebrity in French society. Despite rumors that she was guilty of spying for the Germans herself and, if tried, might be executed, Chéruit maintained an unswerving, if behind-the-scenes, influence on the artistic direction of her company. In early 1915, the house of Chéruit was acquired by its directors Mesdames Wormser and Boulanger, who, Vogue observed, kept the salon "to its original type" while bringing "much originality to it."

In addition to evening gowns, the house was known for chic cinema wraps, furs, lingerie, wedding trousseaus, even children's clothing in rayon. Fascinated by the effect of light on fabric, Chéruit and her designers worked with taffeta, lamé and gauze, and followed the latest trends in art, for instance hand-painting Cubist designs on dresses, coats and other articles of apparel. These striking creations drew the attention of silent film stars, such as Jeanne Eagels.

With the move toward simpler fashions after the war, typified by such designers as Jean Patou and Coco Chanel, Cheruit's taste for opulence lost appeal and she retired in 1923. But for more than a decade, the house continued to produce beautiful, if no longer innovative, fashions including the flapper styles that defined the Jazz Age. In the mid to late 1920s, the brand was especially associated with the photographer Edward Steichen and his enticing images for Vogue of the Cheruit-dressed model Marion Morehouse. The design firm's continued popularity was reflected by iconic references in Evelyn Waugh's 1930 bestseller, Vile Bodies. In 1935, the designer Elsa Schiaparelli famously took over Chéruit's 98-room salon and work studios.

According to the Carnavalet Museum, Chéruit died in 1955.

== Legacy ==
Dresses by Chéruit may be found in the collections of major museums, including the Metropolitan Museum of Art in New York. The fashion house was reestablished in 2008 at its original location, 21, Place Vendôme in Paris.
