= Gilda Darthy =

French actress (1878–1952)

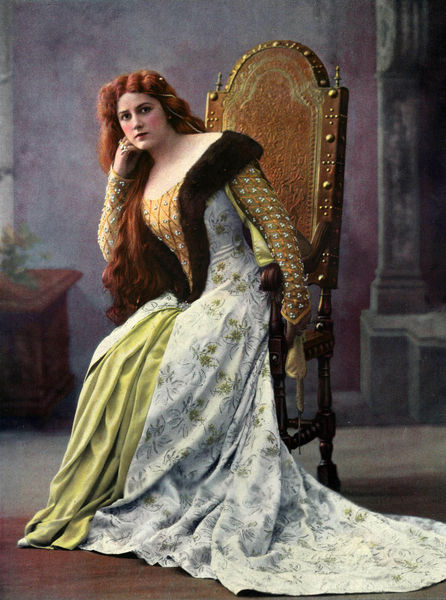
- Gilda Darthy as Marguerite de Bourgogne in La Tour de Nesle (1903).
- Born: 1878
- Died: 1952
- Occupation: Actress

Gilda Darthy (1878–1952) was a French actress.

== Early life ==
Darthy was born in 1878.

== Career ==
Darthy was an actress on the Paris stage. She wore costumes by Paquin and Redfern, and was a popular subject of fashion reporting, photography and postcards, with her red hair often featured. Jacques-Émile Blanche painted a portrait of Darthy, hand on hip, wearing a hat with multiple large plumes. In 1910, she was announced as a passenger on a flight from Algiers to Timbuktu, to help publicize a new French air service across the Sahara Desert.

During World War I, Darthy was one of the French actresses to pose as "La Patrie", a personification of France. In 1916, she made her American debut in The Ironmaster by Georges Ohnet, in which the New York Times reported that she had "extraordinary emotional powers and a voice whose lovely quality is one of her greatest assets." She was also seen in New York in 1917, starring in Sapho, and in La Rafale by Henri Bernstein. While she was in the United States, she appeared at benefit events for war relief.

== Personal life and legacy ==
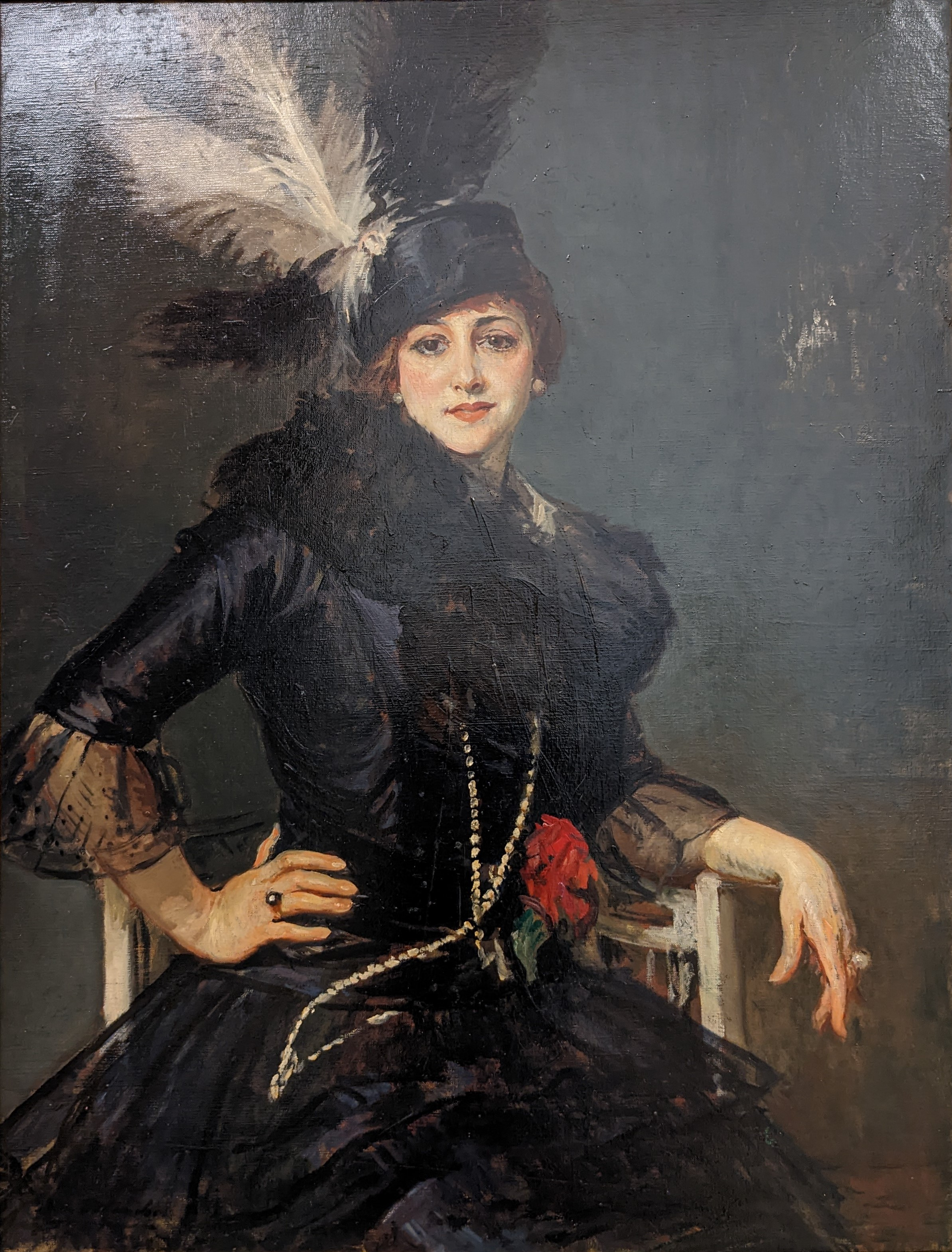
Portrait by Jacques-Émile Blanche

Beyond her acting and fashion roles, Darthy was often in headlines for personal scandals. In 1917, Darthy was sued by fellow actress Irène Bordoni for alienation of affections, concerning Bordoni's husband and Darthy's co-star, Edgar Becman. In 1923, she was in a similar situation with fellow actress Cora Laparcerie and her husband Jacques Richepin, though that dispute escalated to physical violence between the women. Later she was involved in solving a mystery surrounding the death of young industrial heir Marc Bellanger. In 1929, she won damages after a car accident caused her injuries and required her to cut her trademark long hair, because "she refused to deceive the public by wearing a wig."

Darthy died in 1952. An elaborate bed she once owned later belonged to Karl Lagerfeld, and is currently in the collection of the Getty Museum, as an example of an eighteenth-century French lit à la polonaise.
