= Georges Doeuillet =

French fashion designer (1865-1934)

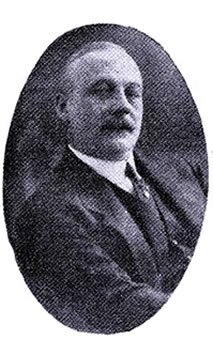
- Portrait of Georges Doeuillet
- Born: 16 July 1865; Oise, France
- Died: 20 March 1934 (aged 68); Paris, France
- Occupation: Couturier

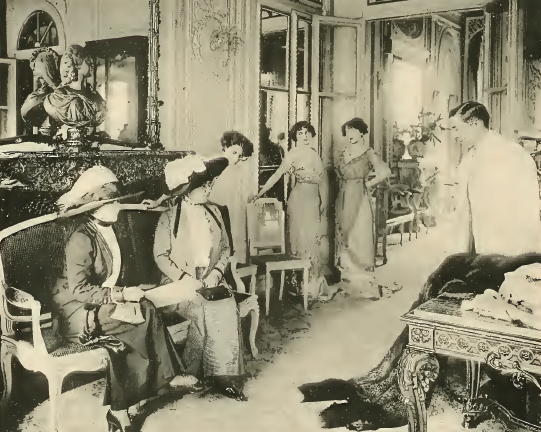
Georges Doeuillet (right) in his Place Vendôme maison

Georges Camille Doeuillet (16 July 1865, Oise, Northern France - 20 March 1934, Paris) was one of France's best known couturiers along with his peers Louise Chéruit, Jeanne Paquin, Paul Poiret, Redfern & Sons and the House of Charles Worth.

== Biography ==
=== Early career ===
Early in his career, Doeuillet worked as a business manager at the fashion house of Callot Soeurs, where he was known for being ardent in business. At Callot Soeurs, he was responsible for discovering Madeleine Vionnet who undertook an apprenticeship at the house prior to establishing her own fashion house Vionnet.

In 1900, Doeuillet opened his maison at 18 Place Vendôme in Paris. Doeuillet, his fashion house was considered one of the most influential houses in France. He was the first designer to locate his maison in the Place Vendôme before other fashion houses followed him to this location.

=== Recognition and business expansion ===
In 1911, Doeuillet was made an Officer of the Legion of Honour in recognition of his contribution to fashion.

Doeuillet designed the dresses for the first performance at the Théâtre Mogador when it opened in 1913. At the performance he showed the world's first robes de style (Cocktail Dress) that influenced a generation of fashion designers who incorporated such styles into their collections. In 1914, in reference to his influential introduction of the cocktail dress, he was quoted by Vogue as saying, "[these] styles are much younger and prettier. In fact, I think we now have the most beautiful style that has been evolved in modern times. It is so good that we can't change it. The women who wear fine clothes insist upon keeping essentially the same silhouette and they are quite right."

In 1914, he moved his maison to a larger location at 24 Place Vendôme.

Doeuillet served as the President of the Chambre Syndicale de la Haute Couture until 1915. He was known for his refined and elegant design style.

The French Government supported the couture "old masters" including Doeuillet during World War I. They sent dresses from their prestigious designers to demonstrate French fashion at the Panama Pacific International Exposition of 1915. Dresses designed by Georges Doeuillet can be found at the Metropolitan Museum of Art in New York City, the Musée des Arts Décoratifs at the Louvre in Paris, the Fabyan Villa Museum in Geneva, Illinois, and at Alingsås Museeum in Alingsås, Sweden.

=== Death ===
Georges Doeuillet died on 20 March 1934, in his apartment, which was located at 34 avenue Montaigne in Paris.
