= Jeanne Paquin =

French fashion designer (1869–1936)

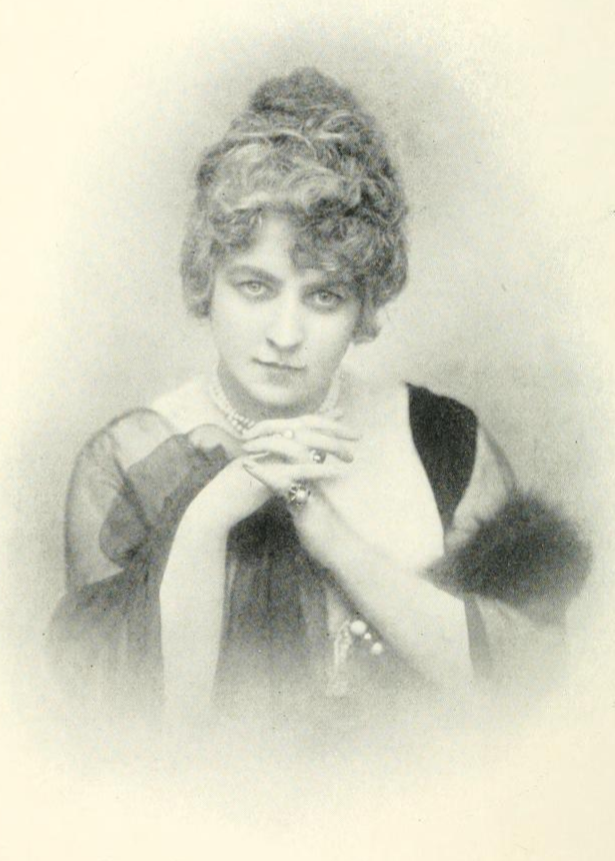
- Madame Paquin
- Born: Jeanne Marie Charlotte Beckers; 1869; Saint-Denis, France
- Died: 1936 (aged 66–67); Paris, France
- Occupations: Couturière, fashion designer
- Label: Maison Paquin (House of Paquin)
- Spouse: Isidore Rene Jacob dit Paquin

Jeanne Paquin (French pronunciation: [ʒan pakɛ̃]) (1869–1936) was a French fashion designer, known for her modern and innovative designs. She was the first major female couturier and one of the pioneers of the modern fashion business.

== Biography ==
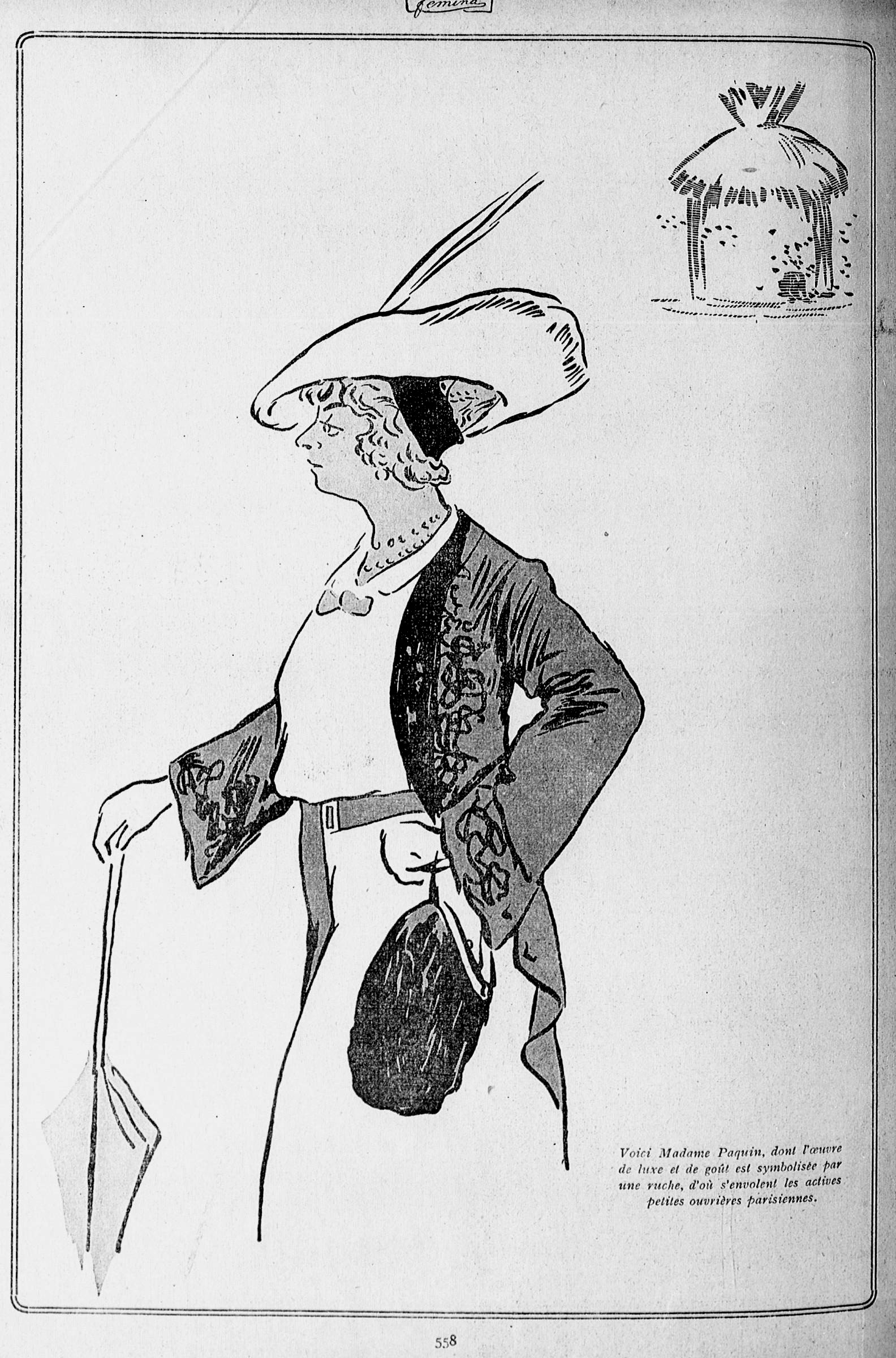
Caricature of Jeanne Paquin by Sem, 1910

Jeanne Marie Charlotte Beckers was born in 1869, at the gates of Paris, at St. Denis. Her father was a physician. Her mother was born on a farm in the Berry. Mother of five by two husbands-the first was a doctor and Mme Paquin's father-she brought up the children herself. Her family consisted of six, for to her own offspring was added a young cousin, adopted principally because there was no one else to adopt her.

Sent out to work as a young teenager, Jeanne trained as a dressmaker at Rouff (a Paris couture house established in 1884 and located on Boulevard Haussmann). She quickly rose through to ranks becoming première, in charge of the atelier.

In 1891, Jeanne Marie Charlotte Beckers married Isidore René Jacob, who was also known as Paquin. Isidore owned Paquin Lalanne et cie, a couture house which had grown out of a menswear shop in the 1840s. The couple renamed the company Paquin and set about building the business.

In 1900, Jeanne was instrumental in organizing the Universal Exhibition and she was elected president of the Fashion Section. Her designs were featured prominently at the Exhibition and Jeanne created a mannequin of herself for display.

Isidore Paquin died in 1907 at the age of 45, leaving Jeanne a widow at 38. Over 2,000 people attended Isidore's funeral. After Isidore's death, Jeanne dressed mostly in black and white.

Jeanne's mother lived with her in a flat on the Rue de Presbourg, near the Arc de Triomphe, which overlooked a garden. Her mother, who had blue eyes and a fresh appearance, cared closely for Jeanne's health, comfort and well-being.

During World War I, Jeanne served as president of the Chambre Syndicale de la Couture. She was the first woman to serve as president of an employers syndicate in France.

== Awards and honours ==
In 1913, Jeanne accepted France's prestigious Legion d’Honneur in recognition of her economic contributions to the country – the first woman designer to receive the honor.
