= Félicien Champsaur =

French novelist and journalist (1858–1934)

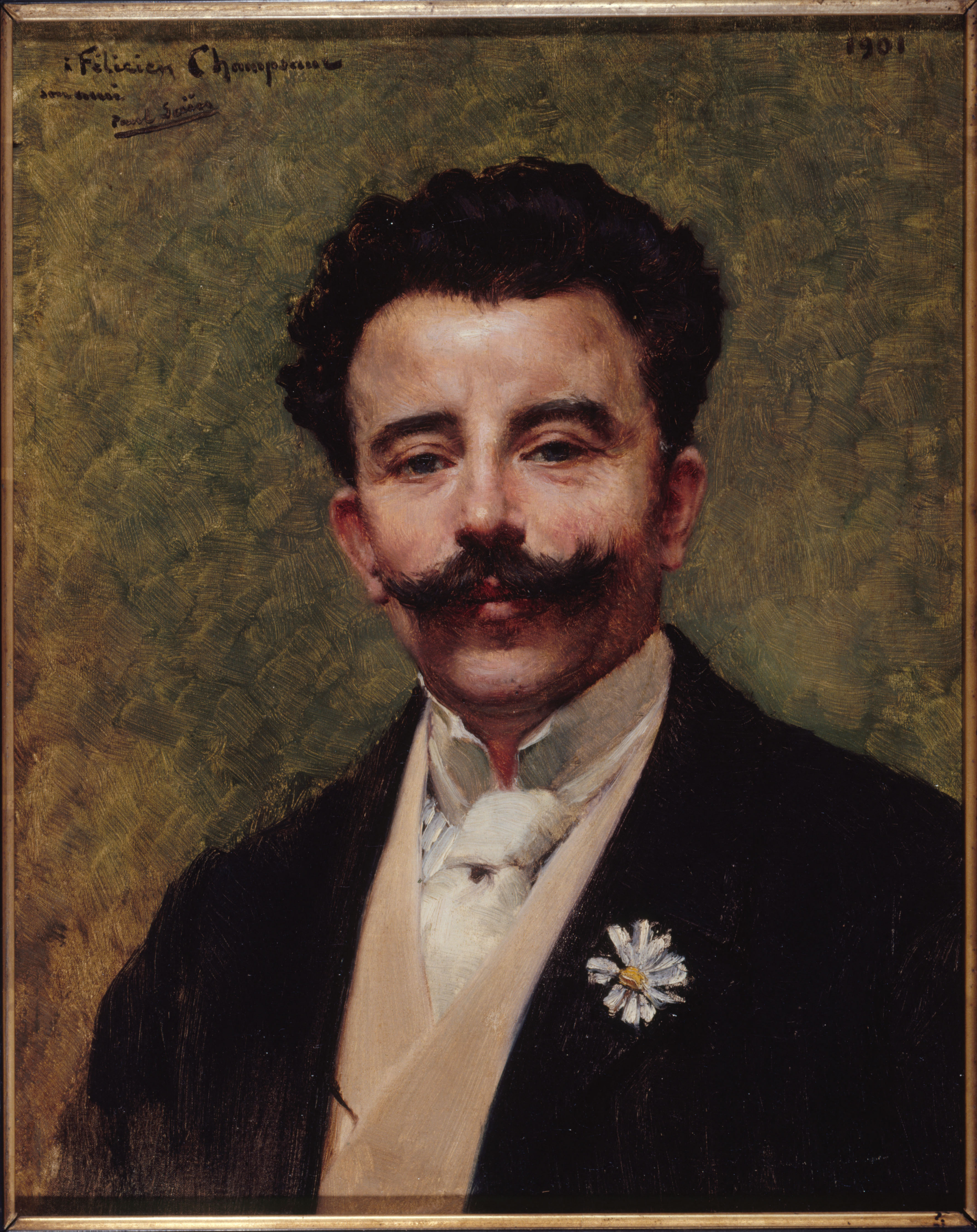
Félicien Champsaur.

Félicien Champsaur (1858–1934) was a French novelist and journalist.

Champsaur was born at Turriers, Alpes-de-Haute-Provence. His first novel was the roman à clef Dinah Samuel (1882), said to present portraits of poet Arthur Rimbaud and actress Sarah Bernhardt. He went on to publish many novels, collections of articles, and other works, including Miss America (1885), Entrée de clowns (1886), Parisiennes (1887), Les Bohémiens (1887), Lulu (1888), L'Amant des danseuses (1888), La Gomme (1889), and Poupée Japonaise (1912), Nora, la guenon devenue femme (1929), a parody loosely based on the career of American dancer Josephine Baker. He died in Paris.

== Works ==
- Dinah Samuel, Ollendorff, 1882, roman à clef; réédition Séguier, « Bibliothèque Décadente », 1999 ISBN 2-84049-134-6
- Miss América, Ollendorff, 1885, roman.
- Entrée de clowns, Lévy, 1886, recueil de nouvelles.
- Parisiennes, Lemerre, 1887, recueil de poèmes.
- Les Bohémiens, Dentu, 1887, Ballet lyrique en 4 actes et 9 tableaux, illustré par Jules Chéret.
- Lulu, Dentu, 1888, pantomime en un acte illustrée par Chéret, Gerbault, Morin.
- L’Amant des danseuses, Dentu, 1888, roman, illustré par Jaquelux.
- Les Éreintés de la vie, Dentu, 1888, pantomime en un acte illustrée par Gerbault.
- La Gomme, Dentu, 1889, Pièces en trois actes illustrée par Chéret, Caran d’Ache, Gerbault.
- Le Mandarin, Ollendorff, 1895-1896, trilogie romanesque (I : Marquisette - II : Un maître - III : L'Épouvante)
- Régina Sandri, Ollendorff, 1898, roman.
- La Faute des roses, Fasquelle, 1899, roman.
- Nuit de fête, Offenstadt Frères, S.d., roman.
- Poupée japonaise, Fasquelle, 1900, roman.
- Lulu, Fasquelle, 1900, roman clownesque illustré par (entre autres) Bac, Bourdelle, Bottini, Cappiello, Chalon, Chéret, Gerbault, Rops, Van Beers, Willette...
- Le semeur d’amour, Fasquelle, 1902, roman Hindou.
- L’Orgie latine, Fasquelle, 1903, roman antique illustré par Auguste Leroux; réédité en février 2013 chez Le Vampire Actif.
- L’Ingénue, Douville, 1905, roman illustré par Maurice de Lambert.
- La Caravane en folie, Fasquelle, 1912, roman « colonial »
- Le Bandeau, Renaissance du livre, 1916, roman illustré par Raphael Kirchner.
- Les Ailes de l'homme, Renaissance du livre, 1917.
- Ouha roi des singes, Fasquelle, 1922, roman
- Homo Deus, Ferenczi, 1923, roman.
- Tuer les vieux. Jouir !, Ferenczi, 1925, roman « vache ».
- Le Bandeau d’Éros, Ferenczi, 1925, roman, illustré par Jaquelux.
- Le Chemin du désir, Ferenczi, 1926, premier volet d’une trilogie romanesque.
- Le combat des sexes, Ferenczi, 1927, second volet de la même trilogie.
- Les ordures ménagères, Ferenczi, 1927, dernier volet.
- Jeunesse, Ferenczi, 1927, illustré par Léonnec.
- Le Jazz des masques, Ferenczi, 1928, roman.
- La Pharaonne, Ferenczi, 1929, roman, illustré par Jaquelux.
- Nora, la guenon devenue femme, Ferenczi, 1929, illustré par Endré, Jaquelux et Naillod.
- Le Crucifié, Ferenczi, 1930, roman biblique.
- L'empereur des Pauvres, épopée spéciale en 6 volumes (1.Le Pauvre 2.Les Millions 3.Les Flambeaux 4.Les Crassiers 5.L'orage 6. Floreal)

=== Bibliography in English ===
- The Human Arrow (2011) (Les Ailes de l'Homme, 1917; rev. 1927) translated by Brian Stableford ISBN 978-1-61227-045-6
- Ouha, King of the Apes (2012) (Ouha, Roi des Singes, 1923) translated by Brian Stableford ISBN 978-1-61227-115-6
- Pharaoh's Wife (2013) (La Pharaonne, 1929) translated by Brian Stableford ISBN 978-1-61227-156-9
- The Latin Orgy (2017) (L'Orgie Latine, 1903) translated by Brian Stableford (ISBN 9781943813315)
