= Republic of Montmartre (Paris) =

Micronation in France, founded in 1921

Republic of Montmartre (République de Montmartre)
- Micronation (unrecognised entity)
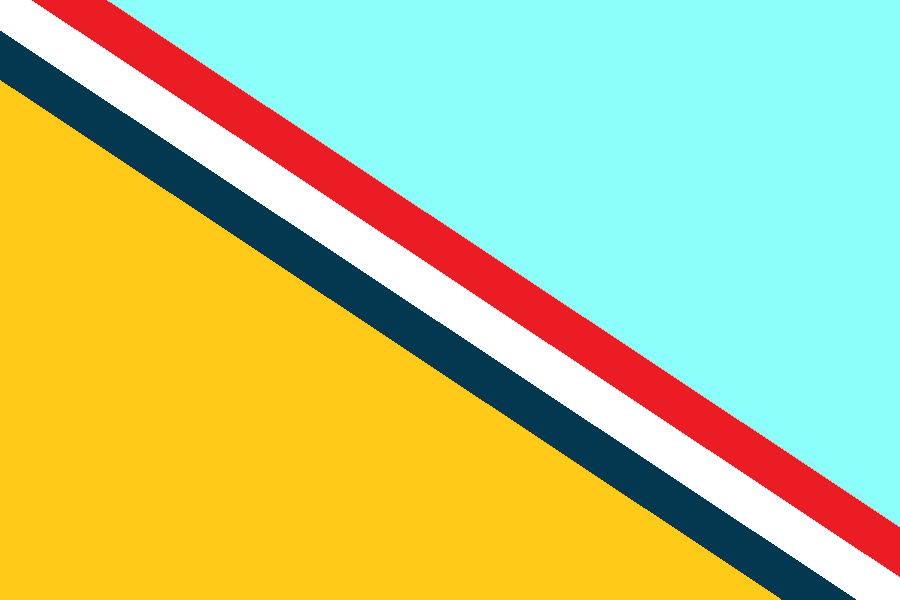
- Location: part of the 18th arrondissement of Paris
- Claimed by: Adolphe Willette
- Dates claimed: 7 May 1921–present

Location of the Republic of Montmartre

The Republic of Montmartre (République de Montmartre) is a Parisian philanthropic association, often referred to as a micronation. It was proposed in 1920 by the cartoonist Jean Barrez (aka Joe Bridge) at a meeting attended by an audience that included several other artists. In the face of modern art and modern architecture, the association aimed to provide mutual support to Montmartre's artists and to protect the area of Paris from the excesses of developers. It quickly developed into a charitable organization, working with poor children.

== Historical background ==
Montmartre has had a long history of claiming independence, going back to the time when Louis XVI issued a proclamation on 22 June 1790, authorizing the inhabitants of the hill (la Butte) of Montmartre to form a municipality outside the walls of Paris. The inhabitants took advantage of this to consolidate their autonomy. In 1871, Montmartre, the main part of the 18th arrondissement of Paris, whose mayor was Georges Clemenceau, witnessed mob uprisings, which were considered to be the beginning of the Paris Commune that seized control of the city on 18 March 1871. Construction of the Sacré-Cœur Basilica in Montmartre began shortly after the insurgents were massacred in May 1871, making the church controversial among some of the French left-wing, who saw it as a symbol of the repression of the Communards.

At the end of the 19th and beginning of the 20th century, cabarets developed in the lower part of Montmartre, while the upper area became bohemian, attracting painters and writers as well as some small farmers. World War I shook Paris, creating a desire for greater modernity, and developers moved into Montmartre. In April 1920, the cartoonist Jules Depaquit, and a few companions, including the singer and songwriter Roger Toziny, reacted to this by creating the "Free Commune of Montmartre", aimed at maintaining the festive village spirit in the arrondissement.

== Creation of the Republic of Montmartre ==
In November 1920, Jean Barrez, a draftsman and printer, and several other artists and art enthusiasts, including Adolphe Willette, Jean-Louis Forain, Francisque Poulbot, Lucien Métivet, Maurice Milliere, Maurice Neumont, Clément Vautel, and Depaquit, decided to extend the spirit of the Free Commune of Montmartre by creating the Republic of Montmartre. Announcing that all political and religious discussion was expressly forbidden in the Republic, they aimed to assert a distinctive community identity and to try to limit urban encroachment. There was also a strong charitable dimension to their plans. The body was formally registered on 7 May 1921, with Willette as the first president. In 1923, songwriter Lucien Boyer wrote the lyrics for the official anthem of the Republic.

== Activities ==
At the time, the neighbourhood was impoverished, and children often went barefoot in the streets. Under the influence of Poulbot, the Republic quickly began to emphasize philanthropy. In 1923, Poulbot opened a dispensary on Rue Lepic to help such children. This provided healthcare, hygiene, food, and clothing, but Poulbot and other founders wanted to offer them something more, so they organised Christmas festivities. These parties, with performances and presents for the children, took place at the Moulin Rouge, the Moulin de la Galette, and the Cirque Medrano. Poulbot remains highly regarded for his work, as miniature statues of him can be purchased at tourist shops in Montmartre.

In 1929 they opposed a construction project that would have altered the rural character of the area. Instead they created a green space, named "Liberty Square", intended for the children of Montmartre. Unfortunately, the park, situated between the Lapin Agile cabaret and the former home of the cabaret singer and nightclub owner, Aristide Bruant, failed to attract the support of the municipal authorities, so the idea of planting vines there was then born, grapes having been grown in the area as early at the time of Roman occupation under Julius Caesar. The first grape harvest took place in 1934 in the presence of the president of France, Albert Lebrun, and with the support of the leading actors, Fernandel and Mistinguett. Since then, the Montmartre Grape Harvest Festival has been held every October, in the presence of distinguished artistic personalities and bands from various countries.

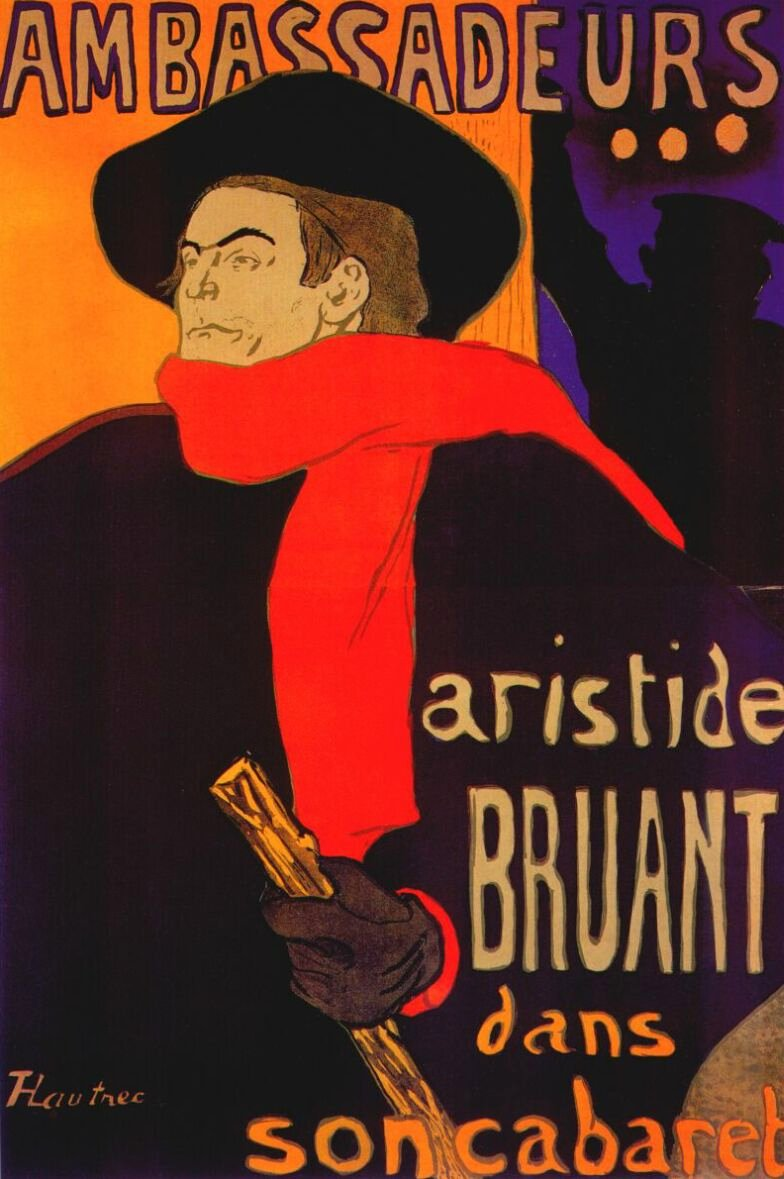
Painting of Aristide Bruant' by Henri de Toulouse-Lautrec. Bruant's style of dress inspired the costume worn by the Republic's members

In 1973, the traditional costume of the Republic was created, based on the costume worn by Aristide Bruant. In 1985, the mayor of the Free Commune of Montmartre officiated in a joke marriage of two famous comedians, Coluche, who took the part of the bride and Thierry Le Luron, the groom, who swore to take each other "for better and for laughs". Since the early 2000s, the Republic has organized two biennale, for books and for contemporary art. True to its origins, it continues to organize Christmas parties for children and invites 5000 poor children to the circus.

The Republic is twinned with several other towns and micronations in France. On 29 September 2013, it celebrated its twinning with Skadarlija, a bohemian district of Belgrade, Serbia. Due to the COVID-19 pandemic, the Republic was unable to celebrate its centenary in 2021. Nevertheless, it is still active, and is run along similar lines to those imagined by its founders, following its motto, "Faire le bien dans la joie" - rejoice in doing good.
