= Francisque Poulbot =

French artist

Francisque Poulbot (6 February 1879, in Saint-Denis – 16 September 1946, in Paris) was a French affichiste (literally, "poster designer"), draughtsman and illustrator.

== Biography ==
He was born in a family of teachers with parents who were lecturers. Francisque Poulbot, the oldest of seven children, was a gifted draughtsman who shied away from the École des Beaux-Arts. Following 1900, his drawings started to appear in the press. He moved to Montmartre where, in February 1914, he married Léona Ondernard, before leaving for the Front; he was however sent back the following year. During the First World War, his patriotic posters and postcards led him to house arrest under the German occupation of France during World War II.

Between 1920 and 1921, Poulbot became involved with the creation of the Republic of Montmartre together with his friends Adolphe Willette, Jean-Louis Forain and Maurice Neumont. In 1923, he opened a dispensary on Rue Lepic to help needy children of Montmartre.

He died in Paris on 16 September 1946 and was buried in Montmartre Cemetery.

=== Descendants ===
Poulbot probably brought up his brother Paul's daughter Paulette, known as Zozo, who lost her mother before she was three years old. She is often described as his adopted daughter. Paulette married the artist Jean Cheval, the son of Adrien Cheval, one of Poulbot's friends. Among other collaborations there is a postcard series by Poulbot and Cheval.

=== "Poulbots" ===
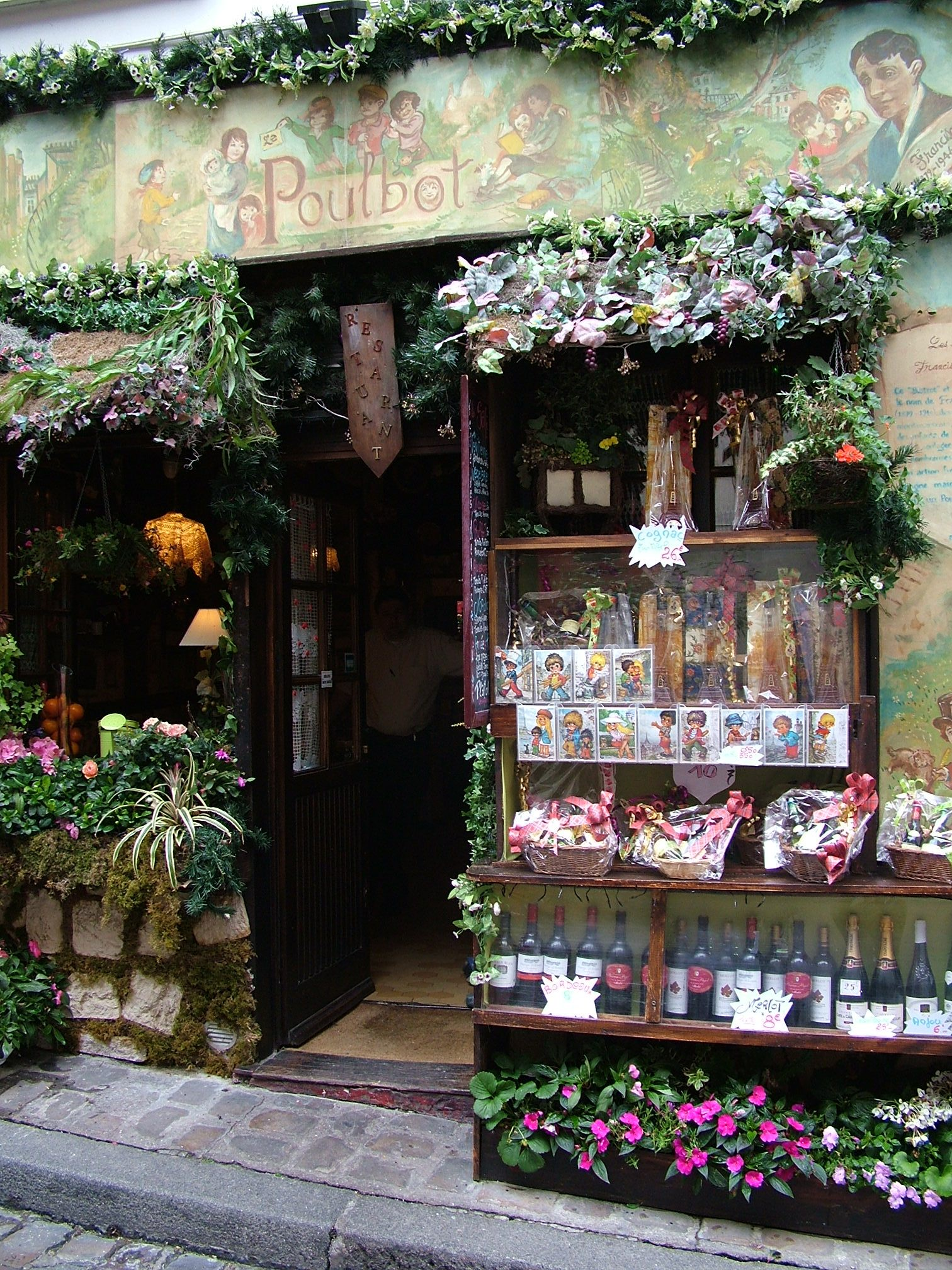
Restaurant called Le Poulbot in Montmartre (3 rue Poulbot)

The French neologism poulbot refers to illustrations representing Parisian "titis": street children. A perfect example is an illustration of Gavroche, the famous character from the novel Les Misérables by Victor Hugo.
