= La Vie Parisienne (magazine) =

French weekly magazine (1863–1970)

Cover of the French erotic men's magazine La Vie parisienne from 1918

La Vie Parisienne ("The Parisian Life") was a French weekly magazine founded in Paris in 1863 by Émile Planat under the name of Émile Marcelin and was published without interruption until 1970. It was popular at the start of the 20th century.

== History ==
Originally it covered novels, sports, theater, music and the arts. The magazine was a supporter of the new Impressionist movement.

In 1905 the magazine changed hands and the new editor Charles Saglio changed its format to suit the modern reader. It soon evolved into a mildly risqué erotic publication. During World War I, General Pershing personally warned American servicemen against purchasing the magazine, which boosted its popularity in the United States.

La Vie Parisienne was widely successful because it combined a new mix of subjects—short stories, veiled gossip and fashion banter, also comments about subjects from love and the arts to the stock exchange—with elaborate cartoons and full-page color illustrations by leading artists of the age. Alongside this, the magazine also reflected the changing interests and values of the start of the 20th century population such as fashion and frivolity and was often regarded as a great illustration of its time.

The artwork of La Vie parisienne reflected the stylization of Art Nouveau and Art Deco illustration, mirroring the aesthetic of the age as well as the values, and this coupled with the intellectualism, wit and satire of its written contributions was a combination that proved irresistible to the French public.

The largest collection of La Vie parisienne magazine artwork in the UK is held by The Advertising Archives, a free-to-view resource holding cover and interior artwork of illustrators including George Barbier, Chéri Herouard, Georges Léonnec and Maurice Milliere.

The historical La Vie parisienne ceased to exist in 1970.

== Notable contributors ==
- George Barbier
- Brada
- Pierre Brissaud
- Umberto Brunelleschi
- Zyg Brunner
- Colette
- Fabien Fabiano
- Fernand Fau
- Henry Gerbault
- Sibylle Riqueti de Mirabeau (as Gyp)
- Chéri Herouard
- Joseph Hémard
- Raphael Kirchner
- Joseph Kuhn-Régnier
- Georges Léonnec
- Maurice Milliere
- Henri de Montaut
- Moi Ver
- René Vincent
- Gerda Wegener
- Sacha Zaliouk

== Bibliography ==
- Marcelin, Émile (1888). Victor-Havard (ed.). Souvenirs de la Vie parisienne (in French). Hippolyte Taine (preface by). Paris: Gallica.
- Arwas, Victor (2010). La Vie parisienne. Papadakis.
