= Zyg =

Zyg may refer to:

- Zyg Brunner, Polish draftsman
- Zygmunt Chychła, Polish boxer
- Yang Zhuang language, ISO 639 language code

== See also ==
- Zygii
