= Thierry Le Luron =

French impressionist and humorist

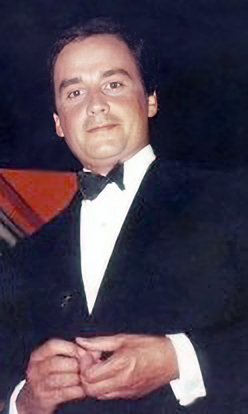
- Thierry Le Luron (1980)
- Born: 2 April 1952; Paris, France
- Died: 13 November 1986 (aged 34); Boulogne-Billancourt, France
- Occupations: Impersonator, comedian, singer

Thierry Le Luron (French pronunciation: [tjɛʁi ləlyˈʁɔ̃]; 2 April 1952 – 13 November 1986) was a French impressionist and comedian.

French DVD cover for a Thierry Le Luron compilation.

== Early life ==
Born in Paris, France, to Francis Le Luron (1926–2012) and Huguette Gousserey (1922–2009).

== Career ==
=== Debut ===
In 1969, when Thierry Le Luron was a 17-year-old student at the Lycée Emmanuel-Mounier in Châtenay-Malabry, he and his friends created a band called "Les rats crevés" ("The Dead Rats") and performed a few gigs in the Hauts-de-Seine region. The band debuted in several Parisian cabarets, including L'Echelle de Jacob. Le Luron was featured on 4 January 1970 on the game show "Le jeu de la chance," a segment of the TV show Télé Dimanche. He won six consecutive times, first singing classic tunes before choosing to devote himself to imitation. He performed his first sketches on the same program, including the 1 February 1970 (imitation Adamo) and 15 February 1970 editions, even on the anniversary of Jean Nohain, when he sang for Prime Minister Jacques Chaban-Delmas and Jean Nohain.

In 1971, Le Luron released his first album, Le Ministère patraque ("The Ministry out of sorts"), which became very popular. He gave his first performance as an actor in Bobino between February and March 1972 and opened for the Claude François tour in the summer of 1972.

=== Success ===
From November 1972 to July 1973, Le Luron hosted his first show, "Le Luron du dimanche" ("Le Luron on Sunday"), on the first channel of ORTF. It was created the same year as his new show was premiered at the Théâtre des Variétés.

Thierry Le Luron performed every evening with some of his friends, his last acts were poignant. The band "Le Luron" included Jacques Collard, Jacques Pessis, Pierre Guillermo, Francis Diwo, Luc Fournol, and Bernard Mabille. The portraits, sketches and imitations were refined and gave birth to very elaborate performances at the Olympia (December 1976), Bobino (February-April 1978), Théâtre Marigny (October 1979 – June 1980), Thierry Fééries at the Palais des congrès de Paris (November 1980 – January 1981), De de Gaulle à Mitterrand at the Théâtre Marigny (January- December 1983), and Le Luron en liberté at the Théâtre du Gymnase Marie Bell (November 1984 – March 1986).

The last show attracted about 400,000 viewers. He then worked mainly with Bernard Mabille and created the character of Adolphe Benito Glandu, caretaker at 22 Rue de Bièvre, a "fairly extensive caricature of the average Frenchperson: an individual with no particular equities, influenced by calamities, and that defines Le Luron: Petainist under Pétain, Mendesist under Mendès France, and Socialist May 10 to 11!".

He also pursued an intense activity on television and radio: Chat en poche by Georges Feydeau as part of the TV show Au théâtre ce soir (released 24 October 1975) and Numéro 1 by Maritie and Gilbert Carpentier (March 1976 and June 1979). From 1978 to 1979, he hosted a weekly show, Les Parasites sur l'antenne, on France Inter including Pierre Desproges, Lawrence Riesner, Bernard Mabille and Evelyne Grandjean as columnists. In 1981, he recorded the theme song of the animated television series Rody le petit Cid.

Thierry Le Luron later imitated Gilbert Bécaud on the TV show Champs-Elysees on 10 November 1984, singing and making the public sing along a song titled "L'emmerdant, c'est la rose" ("The rose is what's annoying", a parody of Bécaud's L'important c'est la rose), with the rose being the symbol of the Socialist Party dedicating this song to President François Mitterrand.

On 25 September 1985, he "married" Coluche "for better or for laughter" ("pour le meilleur ou pour le rire," a pun on the phrase "pour le meilleur ou pour le pire") to great fanfare at a wedding organized by the Republic of Montmartre. A few weeks later his "son," played by Carlos was born. Le Luron said: "I wanted Coluche to be dressed by Pierre Cardin. But...for Mourousi's marriage, he has to make both dresses". This statement, and the false marriage itself, are often interpreted as a public act of vengeance, especially by Le Luron's friends, as most of the attention was focused on Coluche, although the press commended both of them for their outspokenness.

== Death and legacy ==
Le Luron was diagnosed with AIDS at the age of 34, and cancelled his scheduled appearances in December 1985. He died on 13 November 1986.
