= Gazette du Bon Ton =

Fashion magazine

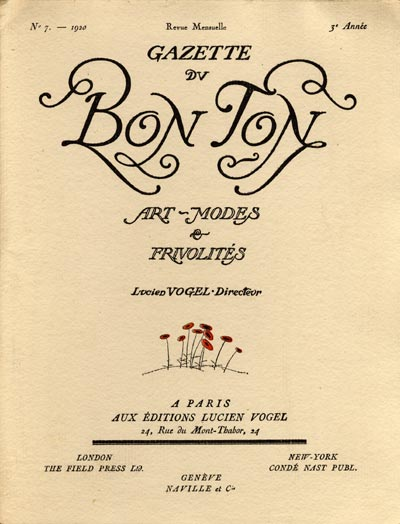
Cover of a 1920 edition of La Gazette du bon ton.

The Gazette du Bon Ton was a small but influential fashion magazine published in France from 1912 to 1925. Founded by Lucien Vogel, the short-lived publication reflected the latest developments in fashion, lifestyle and beauty during a period of revolutionary change in art and society. Distributed by Condé Nast, the magazine was issued as the Gazette du Bon Genre in the US. Both titles roughly translate as "Journal of Good Taste" or "Journal of Good Style."

== Elitism and arts focus ==
The magazine strove to present an elitist image to distinguish itself from larger, mainstream competitors like Vogue and Harper's Bazaar in America and Femina, Les Modes and L'Art et la Mode in France. It was available only to subscribers and was priced at a steep 100 francs per year. The magazine, published on fine paper, signed exclusive contracts with seven of Paris' top haute couture houses – Cheruit, Doeuillet, Doucet, Paquin, Poiret, Redfern, and Worth – to reproduce in luscious pochoir the designers' latest creations. After World War I, a select group of other design firms were added to the magazine's repertoire, including the houses of Beer, Lanvin, Patou and Martial & Armand. However, the editors' choice of designers was arbitrary, and a number of the era's most prominent couturiers never contributed to the pages of the Gazette du Bon Ton, among them Chanel and Lucile. The magazine's title was derived from the French concept of bon ton, or timeless good taste and refinement.

The Gazette du Bon Ton aimed to establish fashion as an art alongside painting, sculpture and drawing. According to the magazine's first editorial: "The clothing of a woman is a pleasure for the eye that cannot be judged inferior to the other arts."

To elevate the Gazette's literary status, the publication featured essays on fashion by established writers from other fields, including novelist Marcel Astruc, playwright Henri de Regnier, decorator Claude Roger-Marx, and art historian Jean-Louis Vaudoyer. Their contributions ranged in tone from irreverent to ironic and mocking.

== Fashion illustrations ==
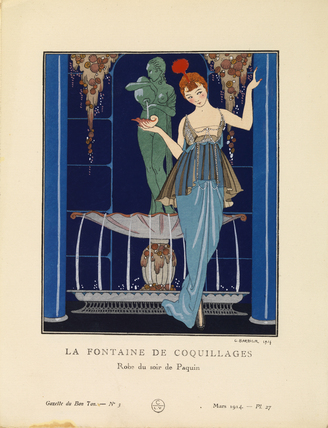
A George Barbier illustration of a Jeanne Paquin gown, published in the March 1914 Gazette

The centerpiece of the Gazette was its fashion illustrations. Each issue featured ten full-page fashion plates (seven depicting couture designs and three inspired by couture but designed solely by the illustrators) printed with the color pochoir technique.

It employed many of the most famous Art Deco artists and illustrators of the day, including Etienne Drian, Georges Barbier, Erté (Romain de Tirtoff), Paul Iribe, Pierre Brissaud, André Edouard Marty, Thayaht (Ernesto Michahelles), Georges Lepape, Eduardo Benito, Soeurs David (David Sisters), Pierre Mourgue, Robert Bonfils, Bernard Boutet de Monvel, Maurice Leroy, and Zyg Brunner. These artists, rather than simply drawing models in outfits, depicted them in various dramatic and narrative situations.

== Works cited ==
- Davis, Mary E. Classic Chic: Music, Fashion, and Modernism. University of California Press: 2006. ISBN 0-520-24542-3.
