= Moi Ver =

Israeli photographer and painter

Moi Ver מוי ור
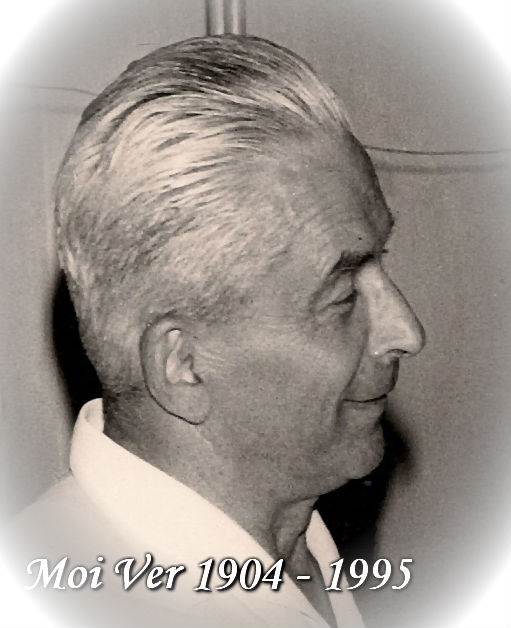
- Born: Moshé Raviv-Vorobeichic; 5 December 1904; Lyebyedzyeva (now Belarus)
- Died: 20 January 1995 (aged 90); Safed, Israel
- Education: Bauhaus
- Known for: Painting, photography

Moshé Raviv (Hebrew: משה רביב) known as Moi Ver, born Moses Vorobeichic (Hebrew: משה וורובייצ'יק; 1904–1995), was an Israeli photographer and painter.

== Biography ==
Moses Vorobeichic (later Moshe Raviv and Moi Ver) was born in the town of Lyebyedzyeva (today Belarus) to Shlomo and Shifra. In 1915, the family moved to Vilna where he studied drawing, followed by architecture, photography and painting at Vilnius University. In 1927, he studied at the Bauhaus school in Dessau, Germany, taking courses with Paul Klee, Wassily Kandinsky, and Josef Albers. After graduation, he enrolled at the Ecole Photo One in Paris. There he published Moi Ver: Paris, a collection of avant-garde photomontages. The book was first published in 1931 by Editions Jeanne Walter with an introduction by futurist Fernand Léger.

In 1932 Raviv was sent by the weekly La Vie Parisienne to Mandatory Palestine as photo-reporter. In 1934, he made aliyah, settling in Tel Aviv. His first wife Rosalia remained in Poland with his daughter, Liliana. After the Israeli War of Independence, he was among the founders of the artists colony in Safed, where he lived until his death.

== Art career ==
In 1928, at the age of 25, Moi Ver documented the Jewish community of Vilna in a photographic series that was exhibited at the 16th Zionist Congress in Zurich the following year. In 1931, the series was published in book form as "The Jewish Street in Vilna." It later appeared in Yiddish, English and German, selling 12,000 copies, with an introduction in Yiddish and Hebrew by Zalman Shneour.

Exhibitions of Moi Ver's work were held at the National Gallery of Vilna (2019) and the Pompidou Center in Paris (2023). In 2024, an exhibition entitle "Moï Ver/Moshe Raviv: Modernism in Transition," opened at the Tel Aviv Museum of Art.
