= Félix Léonnec =

Félix Léonnec was a French writer and film director, born in 1872 in Brest. He wrote and directed films between 1916 and 1923. He was the brother of cartoonist and illustrator Georges Léonnec. His father was Paul Léonnec, a cartoonist.

== Work ==
as writer

- Rigadin avance l'heure (short) (as Félix Léonnec) (1916)
- Rigadin professeur de danse (short) (as Félix Léonnec) (1916)
- Sous les phares (1916)
- L'amie d'enfance (1922)
- Le taxi 313-X-7 (story) (1923)

as director

- Madame Cicéron, avocate (short) (1917)
- La trouvaille de Monsieur Sansonnet (short) (1918)
- Tenebras (co-director) (1919)
- Le trésor de Kériolet (1920)
- L'amie d'enfance (1922)

== Bibliography ==
- Félix Léonnec at IMDb
