= The Advertising Archives =

Archives in London, England

Coordinates: 51°33′37.97″N 0°11′53.96″W

The Advertising Archives is a picture library and museum with an archive of one million British and American press ads, TV stills, magazine covers, catalogues, greetings cards, posters, illustrations and cultural ephemera dating from 1850 to the present day. It is located in London and is the largest collection of its kind in Europe. The archives are not open to the public.

== History ==
In 1989 Larry and Suzanne Viner established The Advertising Archives from Larry's personal collection of thousands of vintage magazines.

In 2002 The Advertising Archives purchased the rights to John Bull magazine from IPC Media. John Bull was a weekly magazine, originally published in the UK from the late 1940s to the early 1960s by Odhams Press, with cover illustrations which epitomized middle-class English life of the time. In many ways it mirrored the iconic cover artwork of its American equivalent, The Saturday Evening Post.

== Collection ==
All of the iconic 20th century brands are represented in the collection including Coca-Cola, Heinz, Nike, Apple, Cadillac, and Chanel as well as thousands of lesser known brands and marketing failures. The collection also features magazine cover artwork and includes the work of famous illustrators such as Norman Rockwell and J. C. Leyendecker. These and many other illustrators were also commissioned to do adverts. The Advertising Archives also holds the largest collection of La Vie Parisienne magazine artwork in the UK.
