= Chéri Hérouard =

French illustrator (1881–1961)

1921 cartoon of a mermaid by "d'Herouard"

La Vie Parisienne 1918 cover

Chéri Hérouard (French: [eʁwaʁ]; 6 January 1881 – 2 June 1961) was a French illustrator who was most famously known for his forty-five-year work for the French society magazine La Vie Parisienne.

== Biography ==
Born as Chéri-Louis-Marie-Aime Haumé in Rocroi on 6 January 1881, Hérouard's father died in a hunting accident just before his birth. His mother remarried to a Hérouard, who was a descendant of the doctor of Louis XIII, and Chéri took the new name. Hérouard married Henriette Tabillon on 17 August 1903. Chéri Herouard's first printed artwork appeared in Le Journal de la Jeunesse in 1902. Upon stepping into the Publishing House of Calmann-Lévy, he met Anatole France, who encouraged him to continue his work.

Hérouard often worked with fairy tale characters and was also a pioneer in the comics format. He submitted work to La Semaine de Suzette before being approached by Charles Saglio, who had just purchased La Vie Parisienne, to become an illustrator for the magazine. At first he resisted, saying he didn't think he was skilled enough. Two years later, Hérouard's first illustration for La Vie Parisienne was published on 9 November 1907. The cover illustrations for the magazine were divided among several illustrators, with Hérouard contributing most frequently between 1916 through 1930. He continued his work with the magazine until 1952. He often created illustrations for books such as Dangerous Liaisons in 1945. For Pierrot, he drew Gil Blas de Santillane (1949), Tambour Battant (1950) and Le Capitaine Eclair (1951). Under the pseudonym of Herric, he also created erotic and sadomasochistic illustrations for various books including the Kama Sutra. He died on 2 June 1961 in Paris.

In 2019 the National Leather Association International established an award named after Hérouard for creators of realistic erotic art.
