= Fabien Fabiano =

French painter

Fabien Fabiano (1882, Lamballe – 1962), pseudonym of Jules Coup de Fréjac, was a French illustrator, portrait painter, and designer. He was descended from a family of sailors and privateers in Brittany, spending his childhood in the small port of Dahouët. He studied in Saint-Servan and then did his military service in Saint-Malo before moving to Paris in 1900. He was married to Nadine Khouzan who was a pianist virtuoso. He attended the preparatory workshop of École des Beaux-Arts, and the Académie Colarossi and took lessons with Alphonse Mucha. His early illustrations were published in major magazines such as the New-York Tribune, La Vie Parisienne, and Fantasio. He traveled frequently and painted the portraits of society members, famous artists of the Golden Age of Hollywood, and political figures.
