= Évelyne Grandjean =

French actress (born 1939)

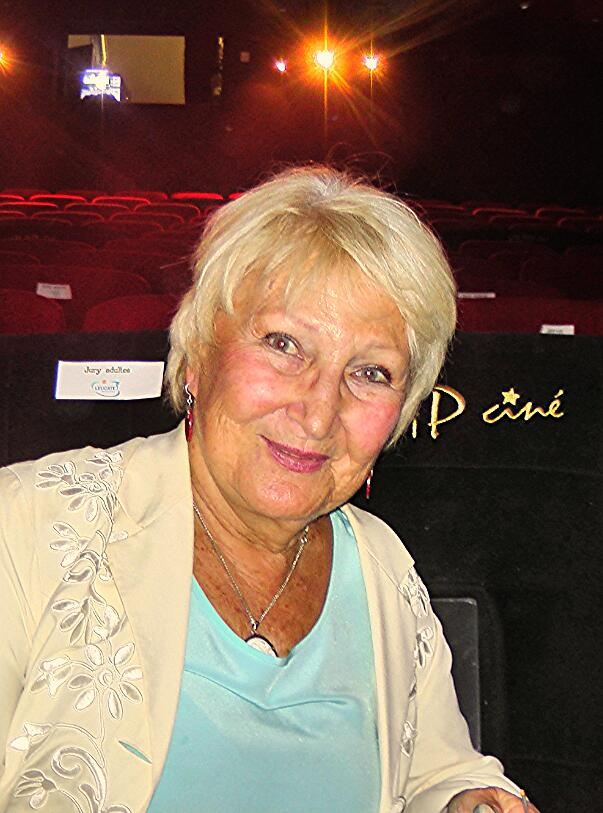
- Évelyne Grandjean in 2016
- Born: 7 April 1939 (age 87); Versailles, France
- Occupation: Actress
- Years active: 1960–present

Évelyne Grandjean (born 7 April 1939 in Versailles) is a French stage, cinematic and television actress, playwright and television writer, and radio host.

She has been also a prolific voice actress for many French-dubbed versions of foreign films and TV series, including 101 Dalmatians: The Series (as Spot, Princess and Nanny), Alfred J. Kwak (as Kwak), The Animals of Farthing Wood (as Adder the Snake), Around the World in Eighty Dreams (as Grandma Tadpole), Babar (as Celeste), A Bug's Life (as Dr. Flora), The Cat Returns (as Natoru), Chicken Run (as Bunty), Cinderella II: Dreams Come True (as Fairy Godmother), Cutey Honey (as Sister Jill), Dr. Slump (as Arale Norimaki), Elvira, Mistress of the Dark (as Elvira), The Flintstones (as Wilma Flintstone), Grey's Anatomy (as Ellis Grey), Ice Age: Continental Drift (as Granny), James and the Giant Peach (as Sponge and Ladybug), The Jetsons (as Jane and Rosie), Maple Town (as Patty Rabbit), Monsters, Inc. (as Ms. Flint), Muppet Treasure Island (as Mrs. Bluberidge), Princess Gwenevere and the Jewel Riders (as Lady Kale), and Princess Knight (as Heckett the witch).

== Theater ==
Year	Title	Author	Director
1960	Les Oiseaux	Aristophane	Guy Kayat
1962	Le Manège conjugal	Goffredo Parise	Marie-José Laurent
1963	Le Printemps	Marc'O	Marc'O
1965	La Nuit de Lysistrata	Aristophane	Gérard Vergez
1965	Caviar ou Lentilles	Giulio Scarnicci & Renzo Tarabusi	Gérard Vergez
1966	Amphitryon	Molière	Henri Massadau
1967	Six Characters in Search of an Author	Luigi Pirandello	Gabriel Monnet
1970	Tonight We Improvise	Luigi Pirandello	Gérard Vergez
1972	The Million	Georges Berr & Marcel Guillemaud	Francis Morane
1974	Tonight We Improvise	Luigi Pirandello	Jacques Destoop
1976	Pourquoi pas moi ?	Catherine Allégret & Évelyne Grandjean	Catherine Allégret
1977	Qu'elle était verte ma salade	Pierre Desproges & Évelyne Grandjean	Sophie Deschaumes
1980	Can't Pay? Won't Pay!	Dario Fo	Jacques Échantillon
1984	Deux hommes dans une valise	Peter Yeldham & Donald Churchill	Jean-Luc Moreau
1986	Les Clients	Jean Poiret	Bernard Murat
1990	Un œil plus bleu que l'autre	Évelyne Grandjean	Annick Blancheteau
1990	Un œil plus bleu que l'autre	Évelyne Grandjean	Annick Blancheteau
1993	Le Parfum de Jeanette	Françoise Dorner	Annick Blancheteau
1995	L'Argent du beurre	Louis-Charles Sirjacq	Étienne Bierry

== Filmography ==
Year	Title	Role	Director	Notes
1991–1993	The Twins of Destiny	The Empress / Paulette	Jean Morisse	TV series (52 episodes)
2001	Maigret	Madeleine Le Goff	Pierre Granier-Deferre	TV series (1 episode)
2011	Fais pas ci, fais pas ça	Mamita	Gabriel Julien-Laferrière	TV series (1 episode)
2015	Plus belle la vie	Dorothée Marcellin-Bourdieu	Various	TV series (7 episodes)

== Dubbing ==
Year	Title	Role	Notes
1978	Watership Down	Hyzenthlay	
1988	Elvira: Mistress of the Dark	Elvira	
1996	Muppet Treasure Island	Mrs. Bluveridge	
1997	Picture Perfect	Rita Mosley	
2001	102 Dalmatians	Agnes	
