= Brada (writer) =

Henrietta Consuelo Sansom Countess of Quigini Puliga
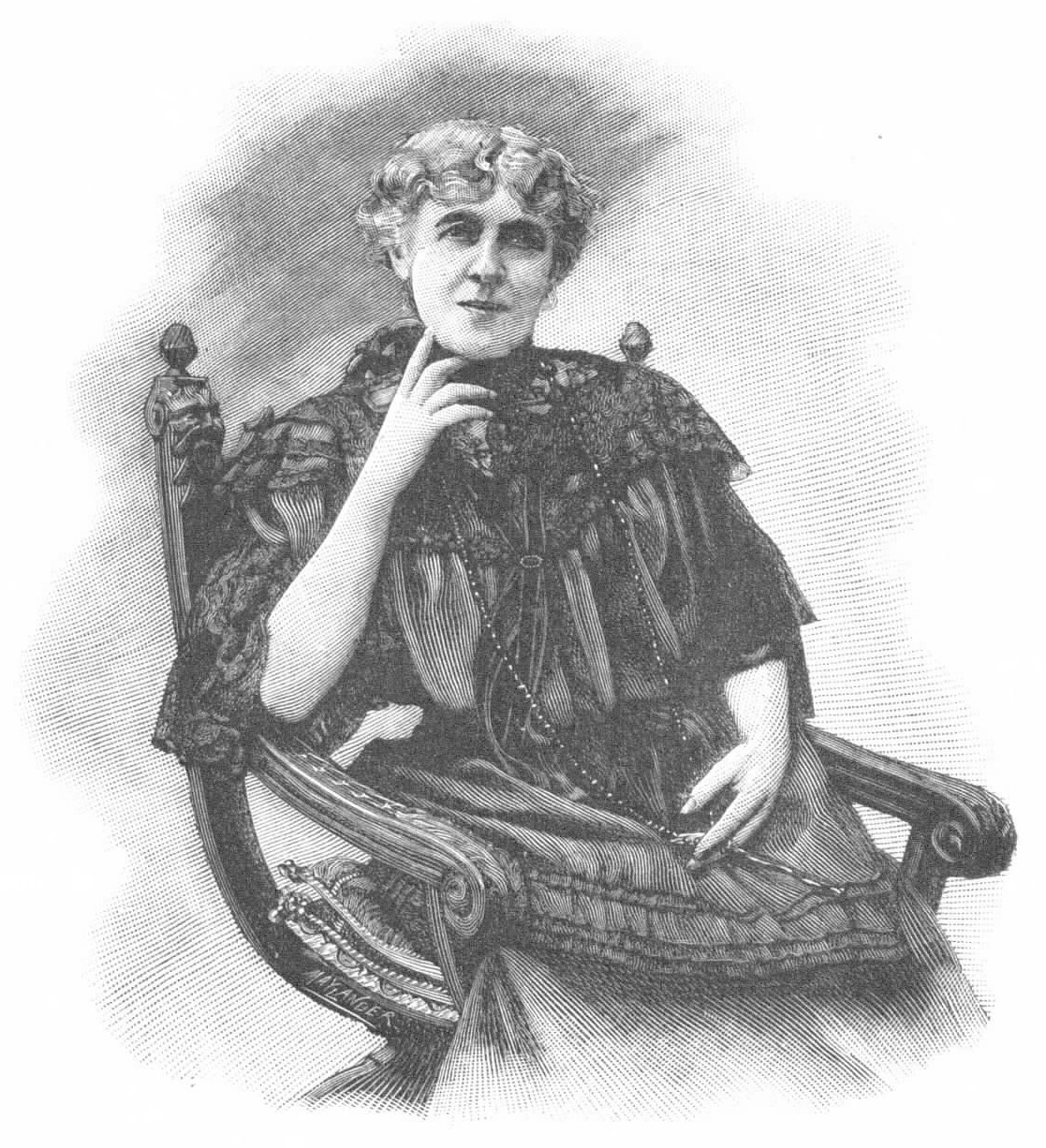
- 1911
- Born: 24 April 1847; Paris, France
- Died: 5 August 1938 (aged 91); Paris, France
- Resting place: Père Lachaise Cemetery, Paris, France
- Occupation: writer
- Spouse: Efisio Quigini Puliga (m. 1868; died 1876)
- Children: 2
- Writing career
- Pen name: Brada
- Language: French, English
- Genres: Chronicle; novel; short story; script; biography; memoir
- Notable works: Madame d’Épone; Notes sur l’Angleterre
- Notable awards: Montyon Prize; Jouy Prize; Xavier Marmier Prize; Legion of Honour

Signature
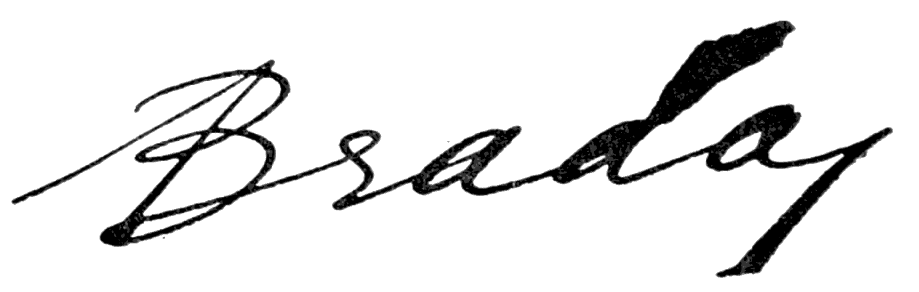

Henrietta Consuelo Sansom, Countess of Quigini Puliga (24 April 1847 – 5 August 1938) was a French writer and novelist known better by the pseudonym, Brada, a shortened version of her earlier pen name, Bradamente. She also wrote on occasion as Mosca. In 1925, she was appointed Chevalier of the Legion of Honour. The Académie Française awarded her the Montyon Prize in 1890, the Jouy Prize in 1895, and the Xavier Marmier Prize in 1934.

== Early life and education ==
Henrietta (also known as "Marie") Consuelo Sansom was born 24 April 1847, in Paris. (Note: Date of birth indicated in her Legion of Honor file, where she bears the first name of "Marie" by which she was sometimes known.) She was the daughter of a wealthy British expatriate, Charles Sansom. Brada spent most of her childhood boarding in a girls' private school located near the Arc de Triomphe. (Note: This was the Pension Beaujon, in the 8th arrondissement of Paris, where César Franck taught music.) Being born out of wedlock, she found herself destitute upon the death of her father, whose inheritance was shared by his legitimate children.

== Career ==
In 1868, she married an Italian count twenty years her senior, Efisio Quigini Puliga (1827–1876), adviser to the Italian Legation in Paris, who died in 1876 following a long illness. To provide for the education of her two young children, she began to write chronicles and short stories under the pseudonym "Bradamente", later abbreviated to "Brada", which were published in the Journal des débats, Le Figaro, the Revue de Paris as well as in several other periodicals such as La Vie parisienne and L'Illustration where she used the pseudonym, "Mosca". Her novels and short stories, which soon appeared in bookstores, met with great success and received awards from the Académie Française with the Montyon Prize in 1890, the Jouy Prize in 1895, and the Xavier Marmier Prize in 1934. She thus continued to write until at the age of over 80, leading a simple life in Paris interspersed with stays in Italy.

The success of her novels was due in part to the aristocratic circles that she had participated in, first while in Paris and London, where she had lived with her father, then in Berlin, where she had followed her husband in his diplomatic career. They were largely based on "cosmopolitan high-society intrigues" depicting "supremely aristocratic passions and vices". Often compared to Gyp, Brada was appreciated by her contemporary readers for her "spontaneity and freshness" as well as for her "elegance and distinction".

She dabbled in different genres. Her first book, Madame de Sévigné: Her Correspondents and Contemporaries, written in English and published in London in 1873, was a study of the correspondents and contemporaries of Madame de Sévigné. Brada's remarks on the decline of the aristocracy and the emancipation of women, which appeared in her Notes sur Londres (Notes on London) in 1895, caught the attention of Henry James.

In later life, she published two memories, one in English, the other in French. In the first, published in 1899 under the title My Father and I, she evoked her early childhood as well as her first steps in British high society in the company of her father, to whom she felt bound by a great complicity. In the second, entitled Souvenirs d'une petite Second Empire and published in 1921, she recounted her memories of boarding school and, among many other anecdotes, the visits she made to Ewelina Hańska, Balzac's widow.

== Death ==
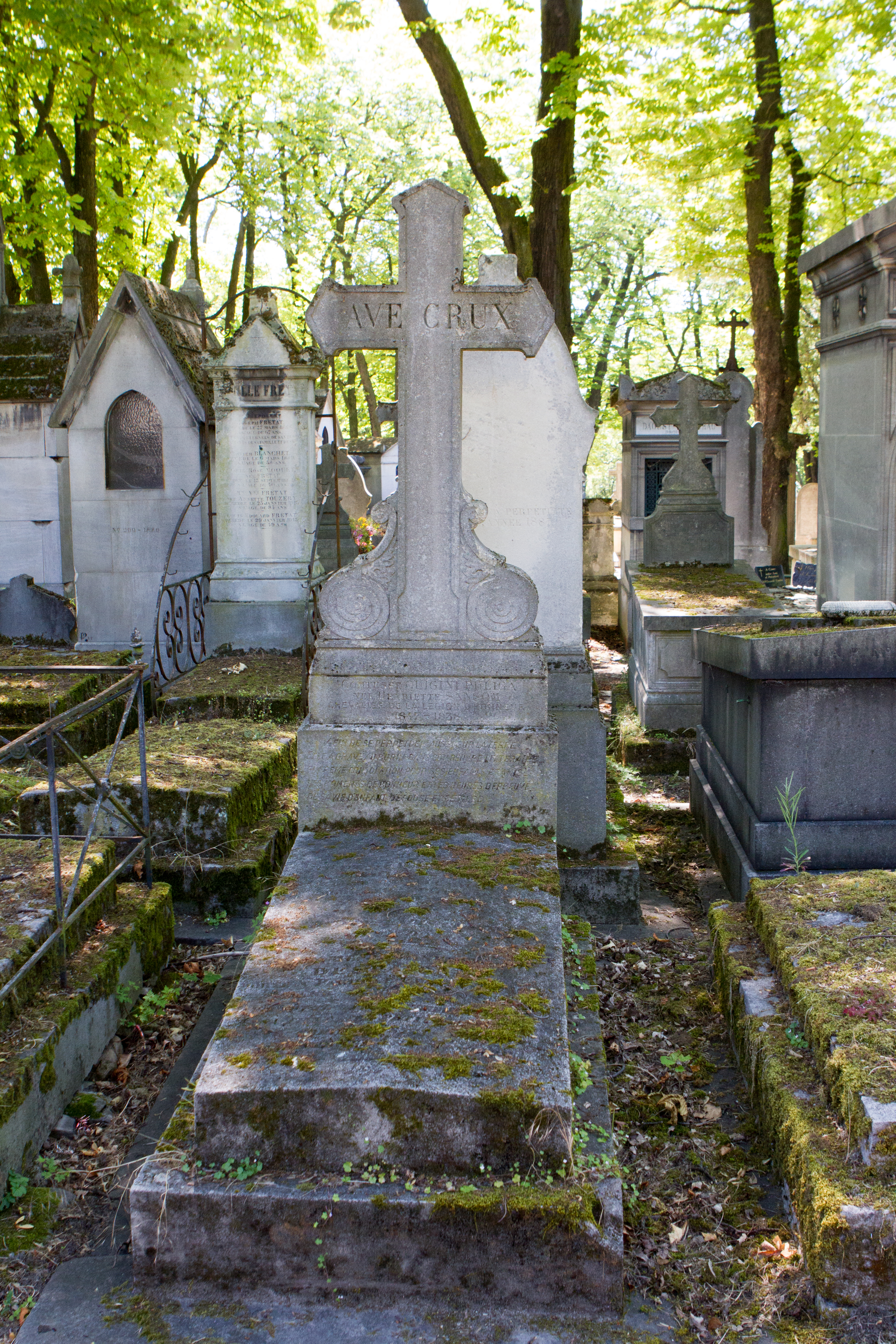
Brada's tomb

She died 5 August 1938, Paris, and was buried in the Père Lachaise Cemetery (section 46).

== Awards ==
- 1890, Montyon Prize (Madame d’Épone)
- 1895, Jouy Prize (Notes sur l’Angleterre)
- 23 July 1925, Chevalier, Legion of Honour
- 1934, Xavier Marmier Prize

== Selected works ==
=== Chronicles, novels, short stories ===
- Leurs Excellences, 1878
- Mylord et mylady, 1884
- Compromise, 1889
- "lzac", Paris, S. Kra, 1924, p. 61., L'Irrémédiable, 1891
- À la dérive, 1893
- Notes sur Londres, 1895
- Jeunes Madames, preface by Anatole France, 1895
- Joug d'amour, 1895
- Les Épouseurs, 1896
- Lettres d'une amoureuse, 1897
- L'Ombre, 1898
- Petits et grands, 1898
- Une impasse, 1899
- Comme les autres, 1902
- Retour du flot, (Collection Nelson) 1903
- Isolée, 1904
- Les Beaux jours de Flavien, 1905
- Ninette et sa grand'mère, 1906
- Disparu, 1906
- Les Amantes, 1907
- Malgré l'amour, 1907
- L'Àme libre, 1908
- La Brèche, 1909
- Monsieur Carotte. La Petite bergère. Le Bal des pantins, 1910
- Madame d'Épone, 1922
- Après la tourmente, 1926
- Cœur solitaire, 1928
- La Maison de la peur, 1930
- Prise au piège, 1937

=== Scripts ===
- Le Coup de feu, Pathé frères, 1911
- Le Geste qui accuse, Pathé frères, 1913

=== Biographies ===
- Madame de Sévigné, her correspondents and contemporaries, 2 vol., 1873 (in English)

=== Memoirs ===
- My Father and I. A book for daughters, 1899 (in English)
- Souvenirs d'une petite Second Empire, 1921
