= Georges Léonnec =

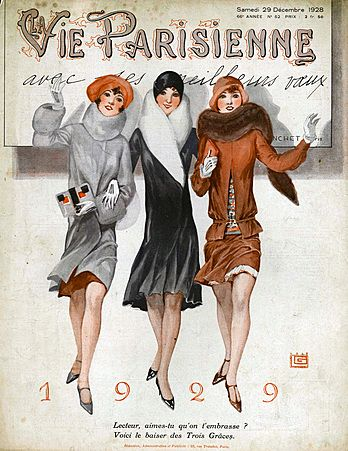
La Vie Parisienne

Georges Léonnec (1881 – 1940), the brother of the novelist Félix Léonnec, began his career as a cartoonist selling drawings to newspapers in 1899. After participating in World War I he worked as an illustrator for the magazine La Vie Parisienne. He worked for several other publications including Fantasio and Le Sourire. He was also well known for his advertising illustrations for Byrrh apéritif wine, Grands Magasins Dufayel, and the Casino of Paris.
