= Femina =

Femina may refer to:

== Magazines ==
- Femina (Sweden), a monthly women's magazine in Sweden published since 1944
- Femina (Denmark), a weekly women's magazine in Denmark published since 1952
- Femina (France), a bimonthly women's magazine in France published from 1901 to 1964
- Femina (India), a bimonthly women's magazine in India published since 1959
- Femina (Indonesia), an Indonesian women's magazine published from 1972 to 2023, currently an online portal
- Femina (South Africa), a South African women's magazine published from 1982 to 2010

== Other ==
- Ethinylestradiol/cyproterone acetate, a birth control pill
- Femina (album), a 2009 album by John Zorn
- Femina (film), a 1990 Polish film directed by Piotr Szulkin
- Fémina, an Argentine folk and hip hop trio
- Femina (UK), a publishing house established by Muriel Box
- Prix Femina, a French literary prize, named after the French magazine of the same name
- Boldklubben Femina, a Danish women's association football club in Copenhagen
