= Pierre Desproges =

French humorist (1939–1988)

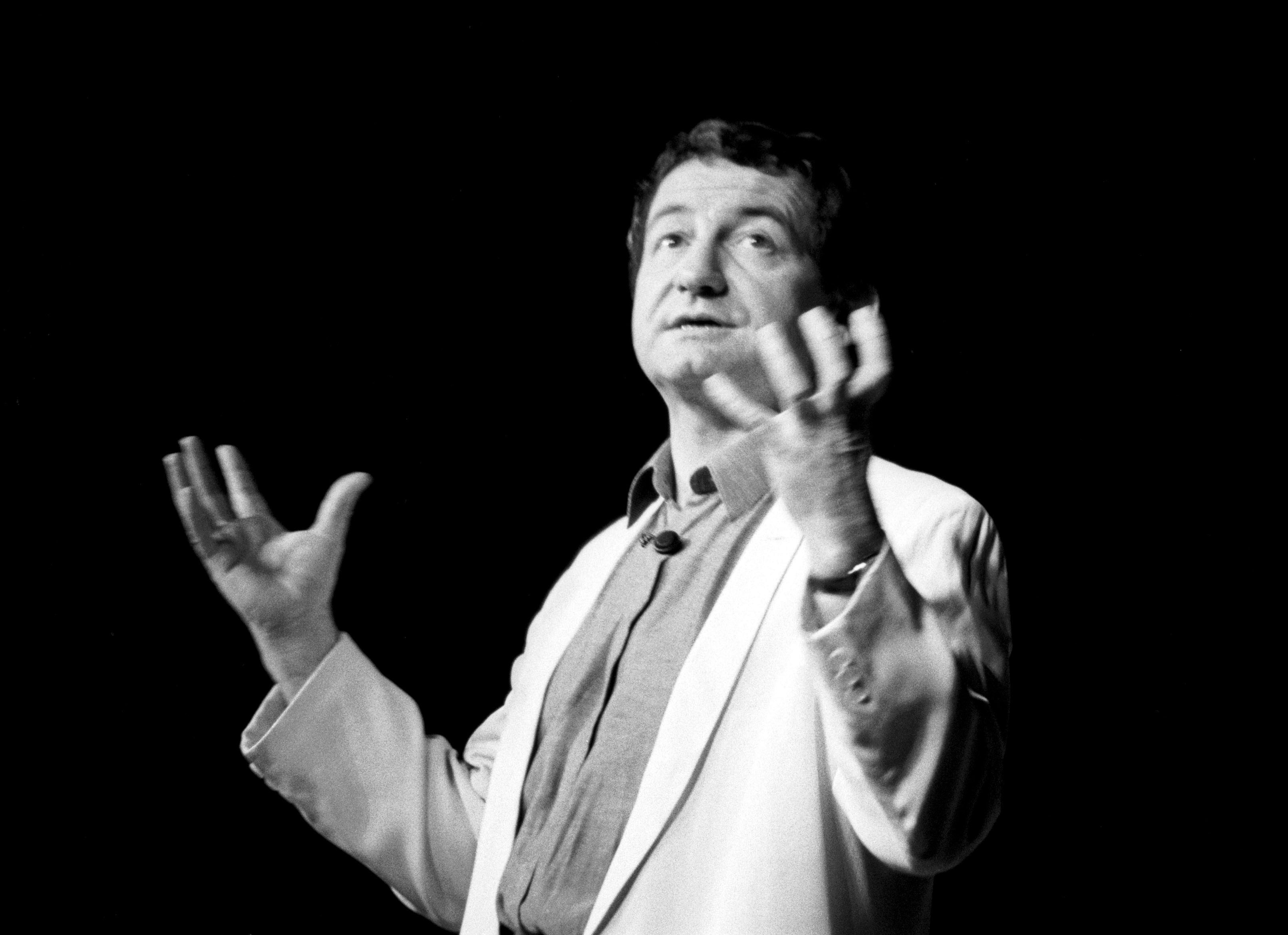
- Pierre Desproges in 1985
- Born: 9 May 1939; Pantin, France
- Died: 18 April 1988 (aged 48); Neuilly-sur-Seine, France
- Resting place: Père-Lachaise Cemetery
- Occupation: Humorist

Pierre Desproges (French pronunciation: [pjɛʁ depʁɔʒ]; 9 May 1939 – 18 April 1988) was a French humorist. He was born in Pantin, Seine-Saint-Denis. According to himself, he made no significant achievements before the age of 30. From 1967 to 1970, he worked as a life insurance salesman, opinion poll investigator, advice columnist, horse racing forecaster, and sales manager for a styrofoam beam company.

From 1970 to 1976, he worked for the newspaper L'Aurore. Starting in 1975, he became a "reporter" on Le petit rapporteur (The Little Snitch), a satirical TV show hosted by Jacques Martin. He caught the public's attention with unconventional interviews of celebrities, among them novelists Françoise Sagan and Jean-Edern Hallier.

He appeared for the first time on stage at l'Olympia during a Thierry Le Luron show. Among other things, he became famous for his Chroniques de la haine ordinaire (Chronicles of Ordinary Hatred), a 1986 radio show.

In the 1980s, he appeared daily on Le tribunal des flagrants délires (a pun on the French term "flagrant délit" meaning red-handed), a comedy show where celebrities were judged in mock-trials. Desproges held the part of the prosecutor for more than two years, a part for which his verve, his scathing humour and his literary erudition were ideally suited.

In 1982, he created La minute nécessaire de Monsieur Cyclopède, a series of shorts for TV, where he played an omniscient professor. He explained how to make King Louis XVI fireproof, proved that Beethoven was not deaf but stupid, and explained why the improbable encounter between the Venus de Milo and Saint Exupéry's 'Petit Prince' was a fiasco. Each episode ended with the catchphrase: "Étonnant, non ?" ("Astonishing, isn't it?")

In 1984, he performed his first stand-up show at the Théâtre Fontaine. This was followed in 1986 by his second stand-up show, Pierre Desproges se donne en spectacle was presented at the Théâtre Grévin. He started work on a third such show, and the drafts were ultimately published in 2010.

In 1987, doctors discovered he had inoperable lung cancer in an advanced stage, and his relatives, in agreement with the doctors, decided to hide the condition from him, so he could spend his final days quietly. He died in 1988, from a disease he had bitterly laughed at, often remarking, "I won't have cancer: I'm against it". He is buried in the Père Lachaise Cemetery in Paris. His family publicly announced his death with the sentence (which he had prepared): "Pierre Desproges est mort d'un cancer, étonnant, non ?" ("Pierre Desproges died of cancer, astonishing, isn't it?")

== "We can laugh about everything, but not with everyone" ==
Desproges is the author of many memorable quotes, in particular "you can laugh about everything, but not with everyone". Although Pierre Desproges never actually wrote it in his texts, he did confirm that "I do think that we can laugh at everything, but not necessarily with everyone.".

The quote comes initially from an "indictment" that Desproges pronounced as "Prosecutor of the French Republic" against far-right Jean-Marie Le Pen on 28 September 1982 at Tribunal des flagrants délires on France Inter radio. In the first part of his speech, Desproges declares: "Two questions haunt me. First, can we laugh at everything? Secondly, can we laugh with anyone?". His answer to the first question is "yes, undoubtedly". He adds that not only can we laugh at everything, we must laugh at everything to "desacralize our stupidity, exorcise our true sorrows and beat our mortal anxieties". To the second question, he answers "it's difficult", in the sense that he, Pierre Desproges, does not want to laugh with anyone, especially the guest of that day, Jean-Marie Le Pen. Pierre Desproges later adds that laughing with "a practicing Stalinist", a "hysterical terrorist" or "far-right activist" is beyond his abilities.

The French magazine Télérama published an interview of Pierre Desproges on 24 November 1982, two months after the broadcast, where Pierre Desproges explains: "I think we have the right to laugh at everything. But to laugh with anyone, maybe not. (...) Laughter is an outlet and I do not understand why we should not laugh at what hurts. Things hurt less when we laugh".

Desproges reformulated his ideas the following year, in November 1983, in his book Vivons heureux en attendant la mort (Let us live happy while we wait to die): "It's better to laugh at Auschwitz with a Jew than to play Scrabble with Klaus Barbie". Bernard Pivot invited Pierre Desproges to appear on Apostrophes, a literary talk show on French TV, on 30 December 1983, to promote his book. Pierre Desproges said "we can laugh at absolutely everything but not with anyone", and declared that when he prepared the speech about Jean-Marie Le Pen, he "did not want to laugh with him".

== Books ==
- "Le petit rapporteur" (1999) (The Little Snitch)
- "La seule certitude que j'ai, c'est d'être dans le doute" (1998) (The Only Certainty I Have, Is to Be in Doubt)
- "Les bons conseils du professeur Corbiniou" (1997) (The Good Advice of Professor Corbiniou)
- "La minute nécessaire de Monsieur Cyclopède" (1995) (The Necessary Minute of Mr Cyclopede)
- "Les étrangers sont nuls" (1992) (Foreigners Are Worthless)
- "Fond de tiroir" (1990) (Drawer Bottom)
- "L'almanach" (1989) (The Almanac)
- "Textes de scène" (1988) (Stand-up Texts)
- "Des femmes qui tombent" (1985) (Falling Women)
- "Dictionnaire superflu à l'usage de l'élite et des biens-nantis" (1985) (Superfluous Dictionary for the Elite and the Well-to-do)
- "Vivons heureux en attendant la mort" (1983) (Let Us Live Happily While We're Waiting for Death)
- "Manuel de savoir-vivre à l'usage des rustres et des malpolis" (1981) (Handbook of Good Manners for the Uncouth and the Impolite)
