= Lyebyedzyeva =

Lyebyedzyeva (Belarusian: Лебедзева; Russian: Лебедево, romanized: Lebedevo) may refer to the following places in Belarus:

- Lyebyedzyeva, Horki District, a village in Horki District, Mogilev Region
- Lyebyedzyeva, Krupki District, a village in Krupki District, Minsk Region
- Lyebyedzyeva, Maladzyechna District, an agrotown in Maladzyechna District, Minsk Region
- Lyebyedzyeva, Miory District, a village in Miory District, Vitebsk Region
