= George Barbier (illustrator) =

French illustrator (1882–1932)

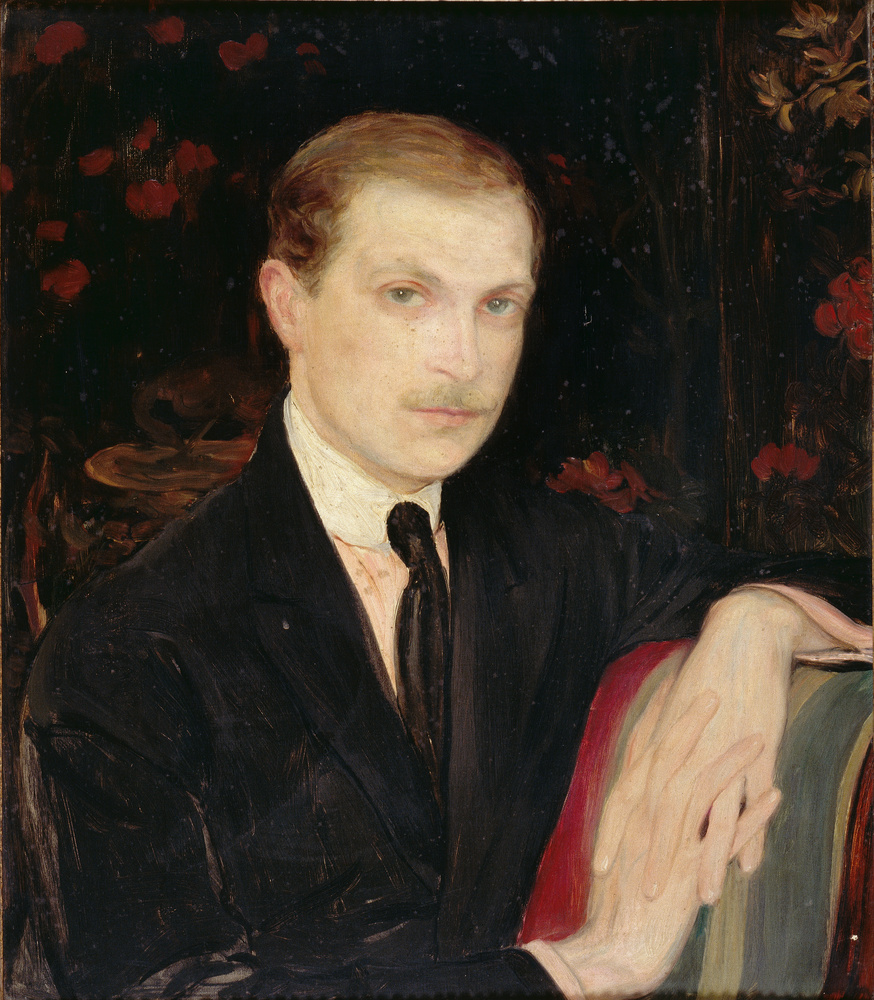
- Portrait of Barbier by Clémentine-Hélène Dufau
- Born: Georges Augustin Barbier; 16 October 1882; Nantes, France
- Died: 19 March 1932 (aged 49); Paris, France
- Movement: Art-Nouveau

George Barbier (French: [ʒɔʁʒ baʁbje]), né Georges Augustin Barbier, (1882–1932) was one of the great French illustrators of the early 20th century.

== Biography ==
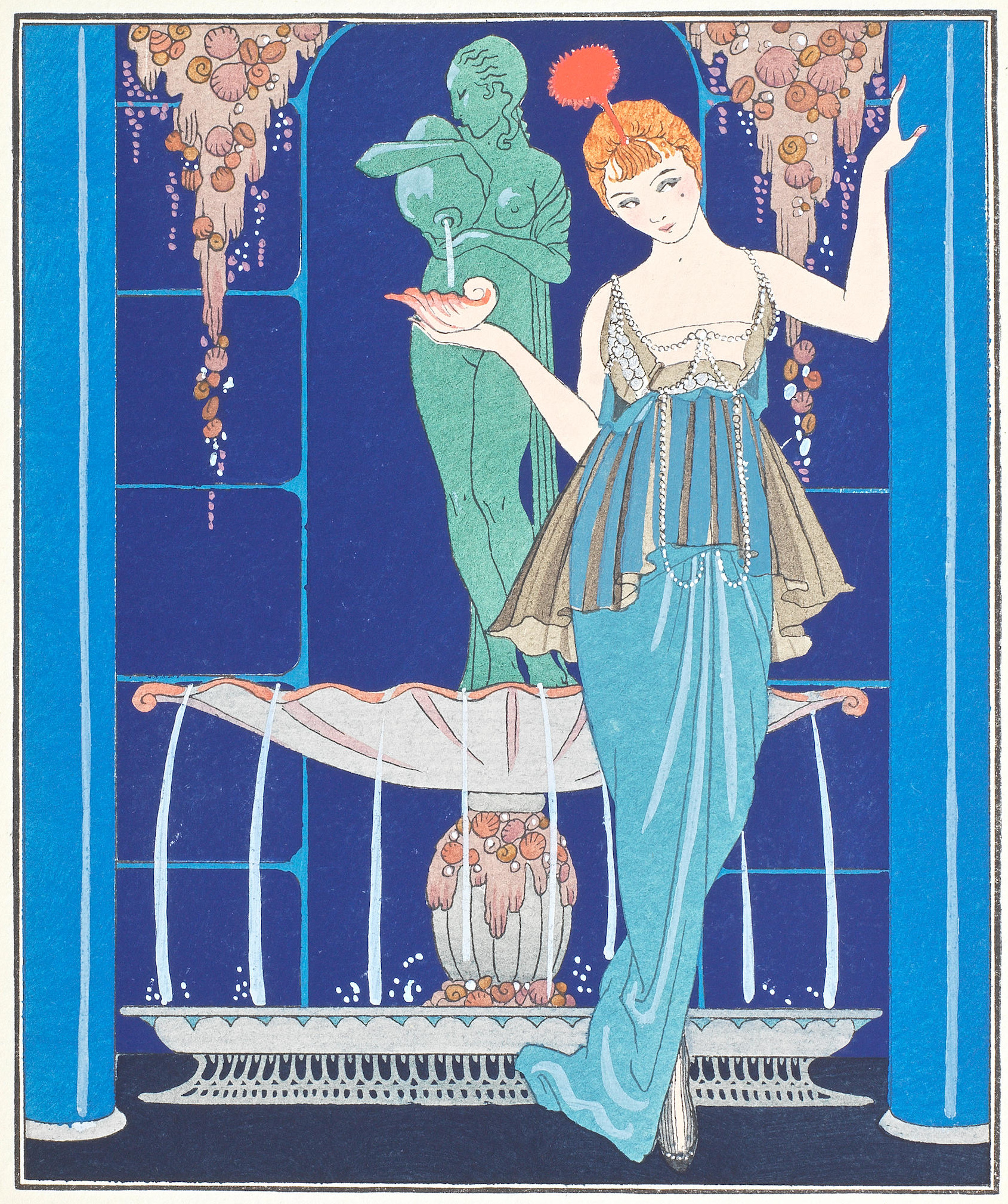
Illustration by George Barbier, published in the Gazette du Bon Ton

Born in Nantes, France on 16 October 1882, Barbier was 29 years old when he mounted his first exhibition in 1911 and was subsequently swept to the forefront of his profession with commissions to design theatre and ballet costumes, to illustrate books, and to produce haute couture fashion illustrations.

For the next 20 years Barbier led a group from the Ecole des Beaux Arts who were nicknamed by Vogue "The Knights of the Bracelet"—a tribute to their fashionable and flamboyant mannerisms and style of dress. Included in this élite circle were Bernard Boutet de Monvel and Pierre Brissaud (both of whom were Barbier's first cousins), Paul Iribe, Georges Lepape, and Charles Martin.

During his career Barbier also turned his hand to jewellery, glass and wallpaper design, as well as writing essays and many articles for the prestigious Gazette du Bon Ton. In the mid-1920s he worked with Erté to design sets and costumes for the Folies Bergère, and in 1929 he wrote the introduction for Erté's acclaimed exhibition and achieved mainstream popularity through his regular appearances in L'Illustration magazine.

Barbier died in 1932 at the very pinnacle of his success. He is buried in Cemetery Miséricorde, Nantes.

== Bibliography ==
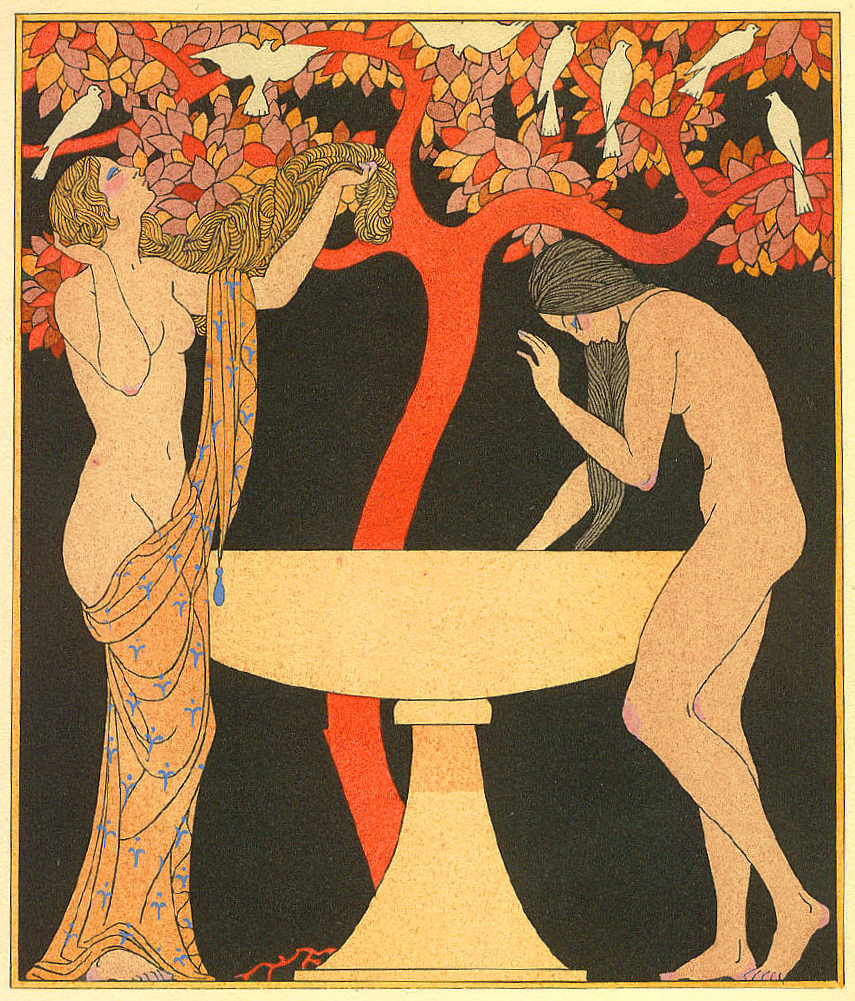
Untitled pochoir by George Barbier from the 1922 edition of The Songs of Bilitis, edited by Pierre Corrard

- Georges Lepape, Paul Iribe, and George Barbier. L'éventail Et La Fourrure Chez Paquin; English translation: The Fan and the Fur at Paquin (Paris: Maquet, 1911) OCLC 221452848
- René Kieffer, ed. Dessins de George Barbier; English translation: Designs of George Barbier (1920) OCLC 729836377
- George Barbier. Falbalas et Fanfreluches Pour 1925; English translation: Ruffles and Frills for 1925 (Paris: Meynial, 1925) OCLC 356369658
  - Madeleine Ginsburg, ed. Art Deco Costumes (London: Bracken Books, 1988). Reproduces the complete plates from the almanacs Falbalas et fanfreluches, by George Barbier, Meynial, Paris, 1922–1926. OCLC 977998844
