= Raphael Kirchner =

Austrian artist

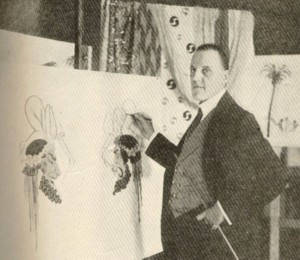
- Raphael Kirchner
- Born: 5 May 1875; Vienna, Austria
- Died: 2 August 1917 (aged 42); New York, US
- Education: Academy of Fine Arts Vienna
- Known for: Painter, illustrator and portraitist
- Movement: Orientalist; Art Nouveau

Raphael Kirchner (5 May 1875 – 2 August 1917) was an Austrian artist, principally a portrait painter and illustrator best known for Art Nouveau and early pin-up work, especially in picture postcard format. His work served as an early inspiration to Peruvian painter Alberto Vargas, who had a career in the United States for the film and men's magazine industry.

== Early life ==
Kirchner was born in 1875 in Vienna, Austria, and attended the Academy of Fine Arts Vienna. He moved to Paris in the year 1900, making illustrations for such magazines as La Vie Parisienne.

In 1914, at the outbreak of World War I, Kirchner moved to the United States. He lived in New York City until his death in 1917.

== Work ==
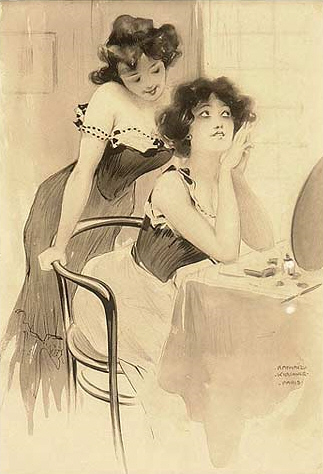
Women at their Toilette, date unknown

Raphael Kirchner produced over a thousand published paintings and drawings in his lifetime, mostly in the form of picture postcards. His orientalist "Geisha" series was among his most popular, with over 40,000 cards sold. The series is a notable example of the cross-influence between Art Nouveau in the West and Japanese art of the Meiji and Taishō periods. Kirchner's often mildly erotic paintings of feminine beauty, in convenient postcard and magazine page form, were among the early pin-ups favored by European and American soldiers in World War I.

Peruvian painter Alberto Vargas cited Kirchner as an influence, and was noted for his own paintings of beautiful women in a related style. He painted for movie posters and later illustrations in men's magazines.

Kirchner's lasting influence on the pin-up genre was still recognized in the World War II pin-up heyday period. Kirchner also produced a small number of sculptures, some of which were photographed for postcards as well. In New York, he also produced costume designs for musical theatre productions.

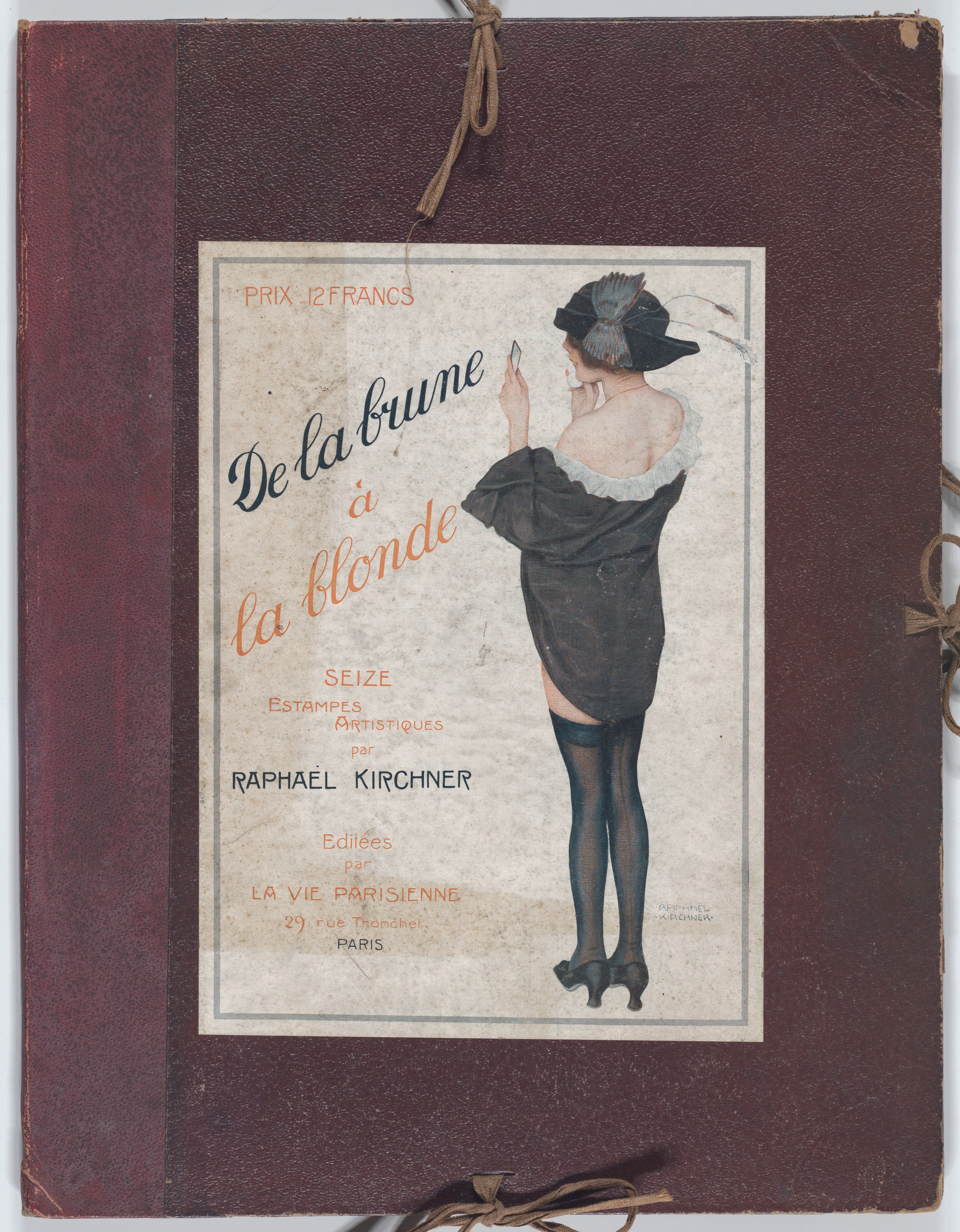
"De la Brune à la Blonde," poster, 1914

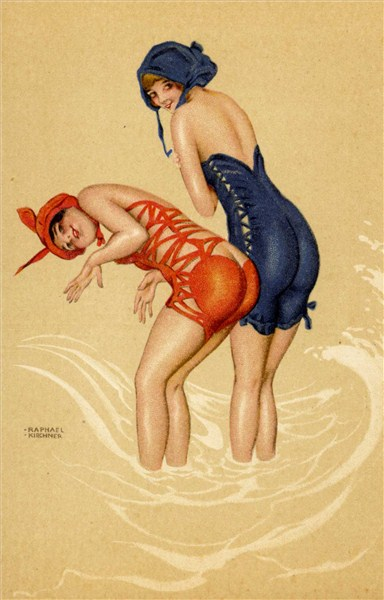
La Mer Fleurie, postcard design, c. 1915

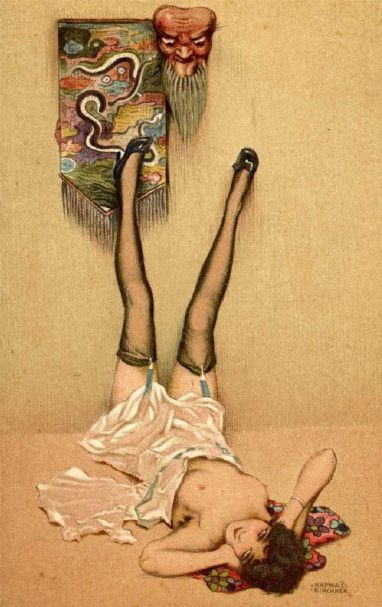
Le Masque impassible, date unknown

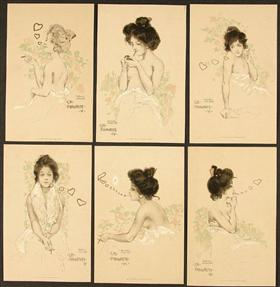
Favorite, date unknown

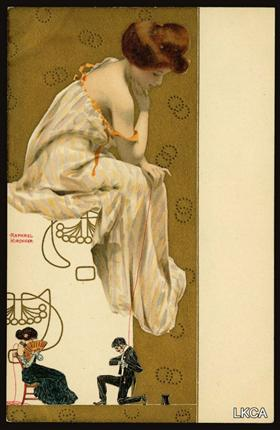
Marionettes, date unknown

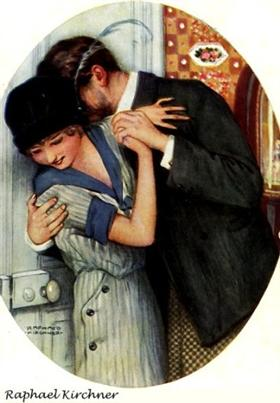
The Embrace

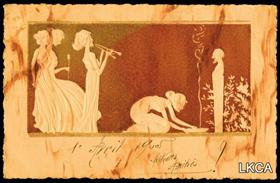
Ivory-sculpture, no title, date unknown

== See also ==
- List of Orientalist artists
- Orientalism
