= Maurice Milliere =

French painter, printmaker and illustrator

Maurice Milliere (1871–1946) was a French painter, printmaker and illustrator, born in Le Havre to upper working-class parents; his father was a merchant's clerk. His early artistic interests are not known, but he completed his secondary education at the Ecole De Beaux Arts in Le Havre before travelling to Paris in 1889 to continue his studies at the l'Ecole des Arts Decoratifs and l'Ecole des Beaux-Arts.

He was a contemporary of Louis Icart, although some his early etchings (from c1907) predate those of Icart. Milliere served as an early inspiration to Alberto Vargas and Enoch Bolles and was undeniably a commercial success. In addition to his original works of art such as the oil paintings and etchings, he was a prolific commercial illustrator, being commissioned to create images that were used in magazines such as La Vie Parisienne, Le Sourire — reprinted in US during the 1920s — and Fantasio, on postcards, posters, menus and product packaging.

He also gained much critical success, exhibiting at "Salon des Artistes Francais", "Salon des Humoristes" being made a Chevalier de la Légion d'honneur and at the 1931 L'Exposition Coloniale where he was awarded a gold medal.

He helped to establish the genre of boudoir art. Millière died in 1946 at the age of 74.
