= Zyg Brunner =

Polish draftsman, caricaturist, and illustrator

Zyg Brunner, also known as Zygismund Brunner, or Sigismond Leopold (12 November 1878, Warsaw – 7 April 1961, Paris) was a Polish draftsman, caricaturist, and illustrator.

Brunner arrived in Paris at the turn of the century and had his first art exhibition in 1905 at the age of twenty-seven. He submitted works to the Gazette du Bon Ton and created illustrations for children's books such as Grimm's Fairy Tales, as well as for risqué novels. He worked for La Vie Parisienne, Fantasio, La Baïonnette, Le Rire, Le Sourire, Monsieur, and many other publications. Anatole France had him illustrate his novel Abeille. He also designed a fabric print, "Beaucoup de Chiens" ("Lots of Dog"), for the Stehli Silk Corporation.
