= Henry Gerbault =

French painter

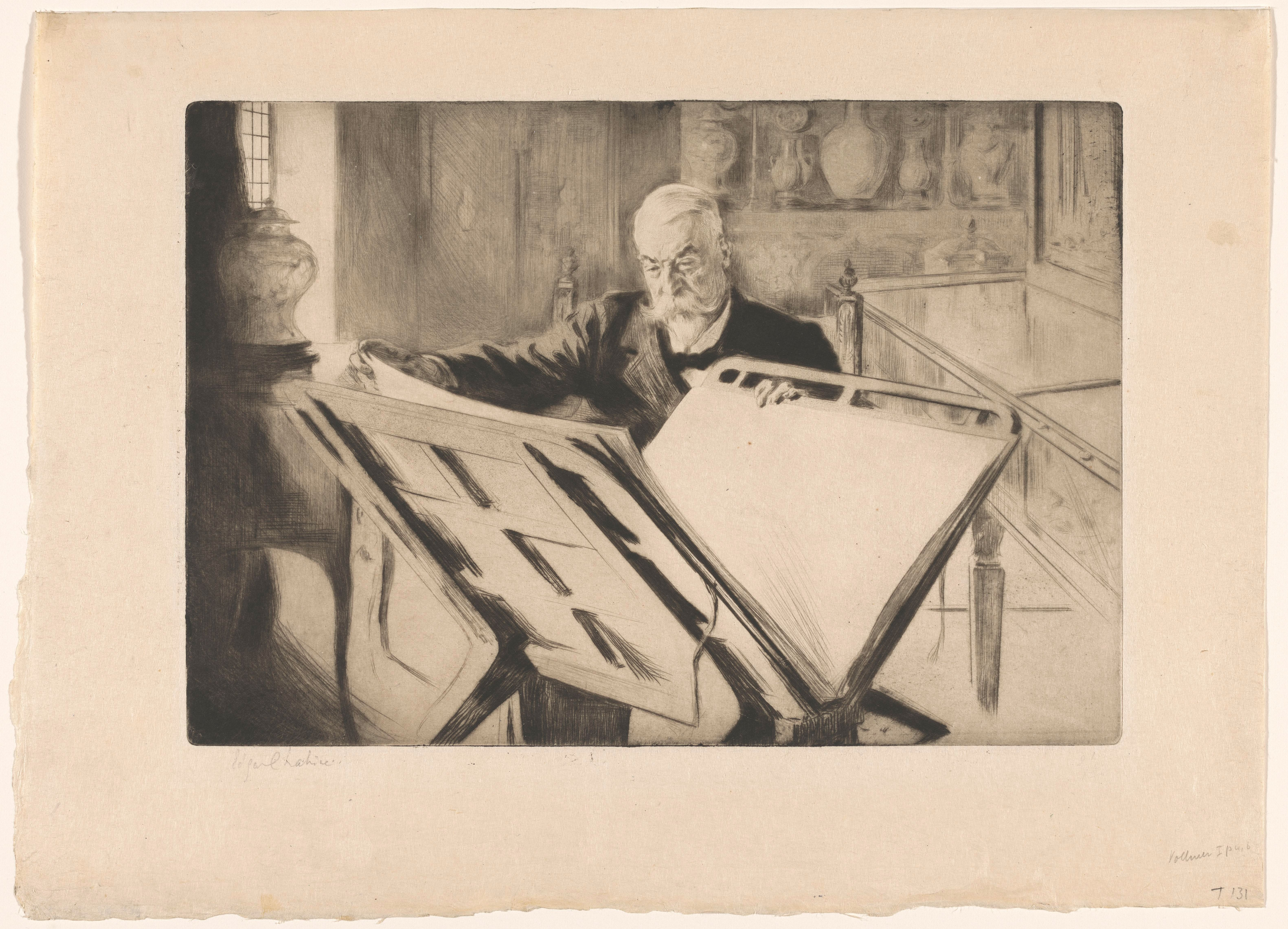
Portrait of Henri Gerbault by Edgar Chahine

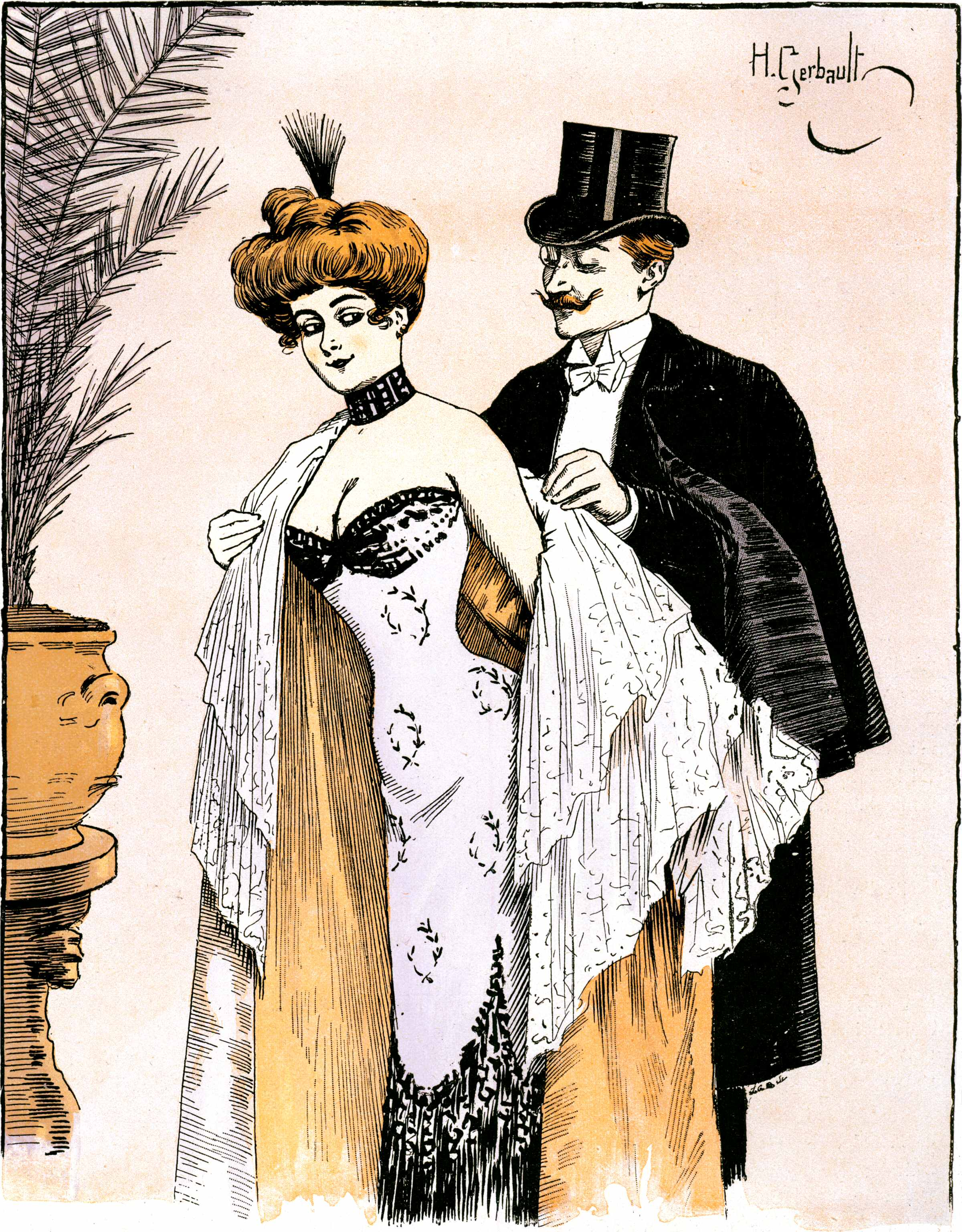
"Would you take offense if I had the gall to plant a kiss on this beautiful shoulder?" "You'll figure that out soon enough after the deed." (poster by Henri Gerbault)

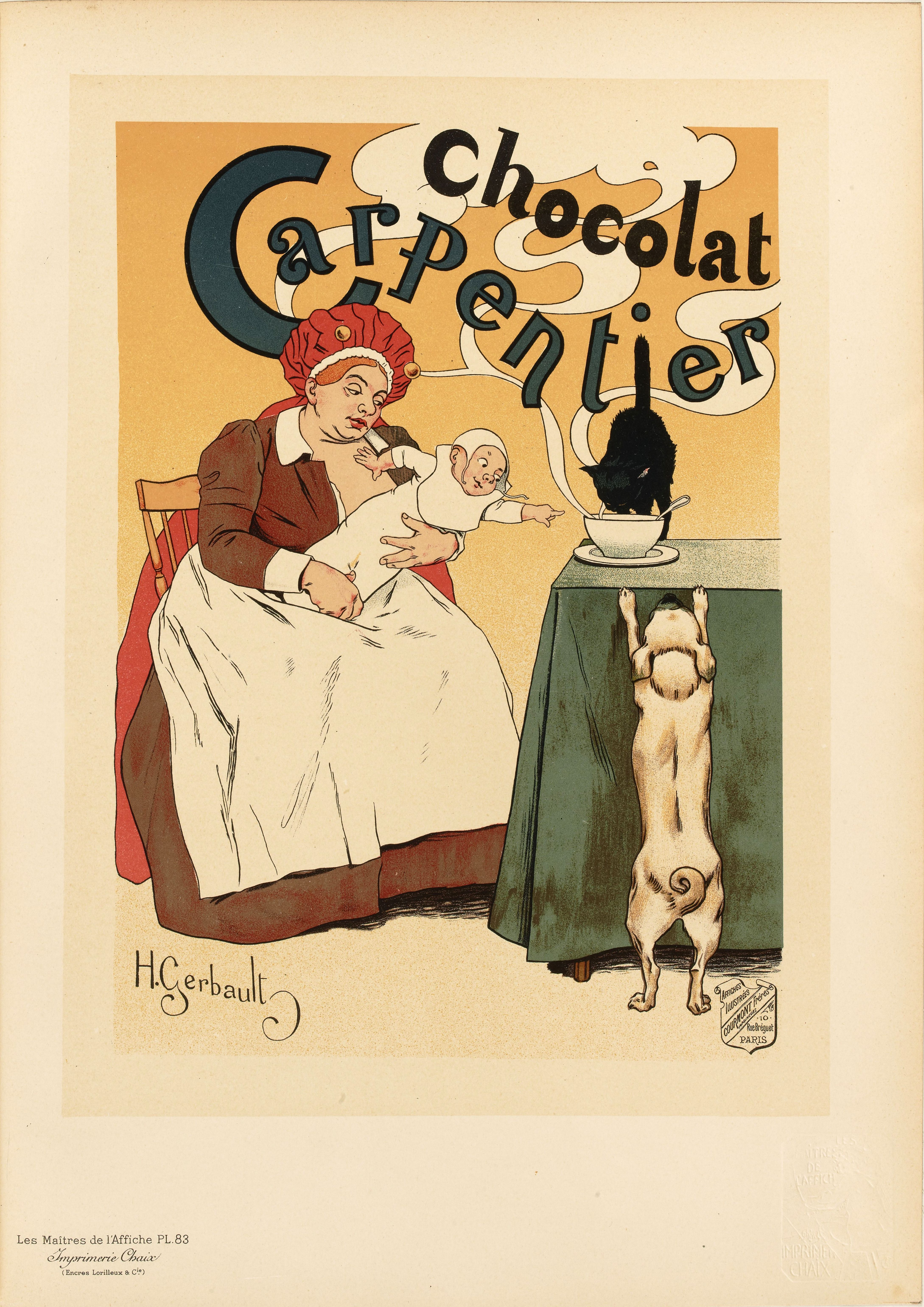
Poster 83 in Les Maîtres de l'Affiche

Henri Gerbault, Henry Gerbault, or Jean Louis Armand Henri Gerbault (24 June 1863 – 19 October 1930) was a French illustrator, water color painter, and poster artist.

He was born in Châtenay, Paris, France and was the nephew of the poet Sully Prudhomme. Henri studied at the École des Beaux-Arts in Paris to be a painter. Unsuccessful, he began submitting satirical cartoons to various newspaper and magazines. His work was published in magazines such as La Vie Parisienne, Fantasio, Le Rire, L'Art et la Mode and La Vie Moderne.

During his later years his wife was diagnosed with a chronic illness and they relocated to Roscoff, Brittany in 1919.

Henri Gerbault died on 19 October 1930, several years after his wife. They are both buried in the cemetery at Roscoff.
