= Maurice Neumont =

French lithographer (1868–1930)

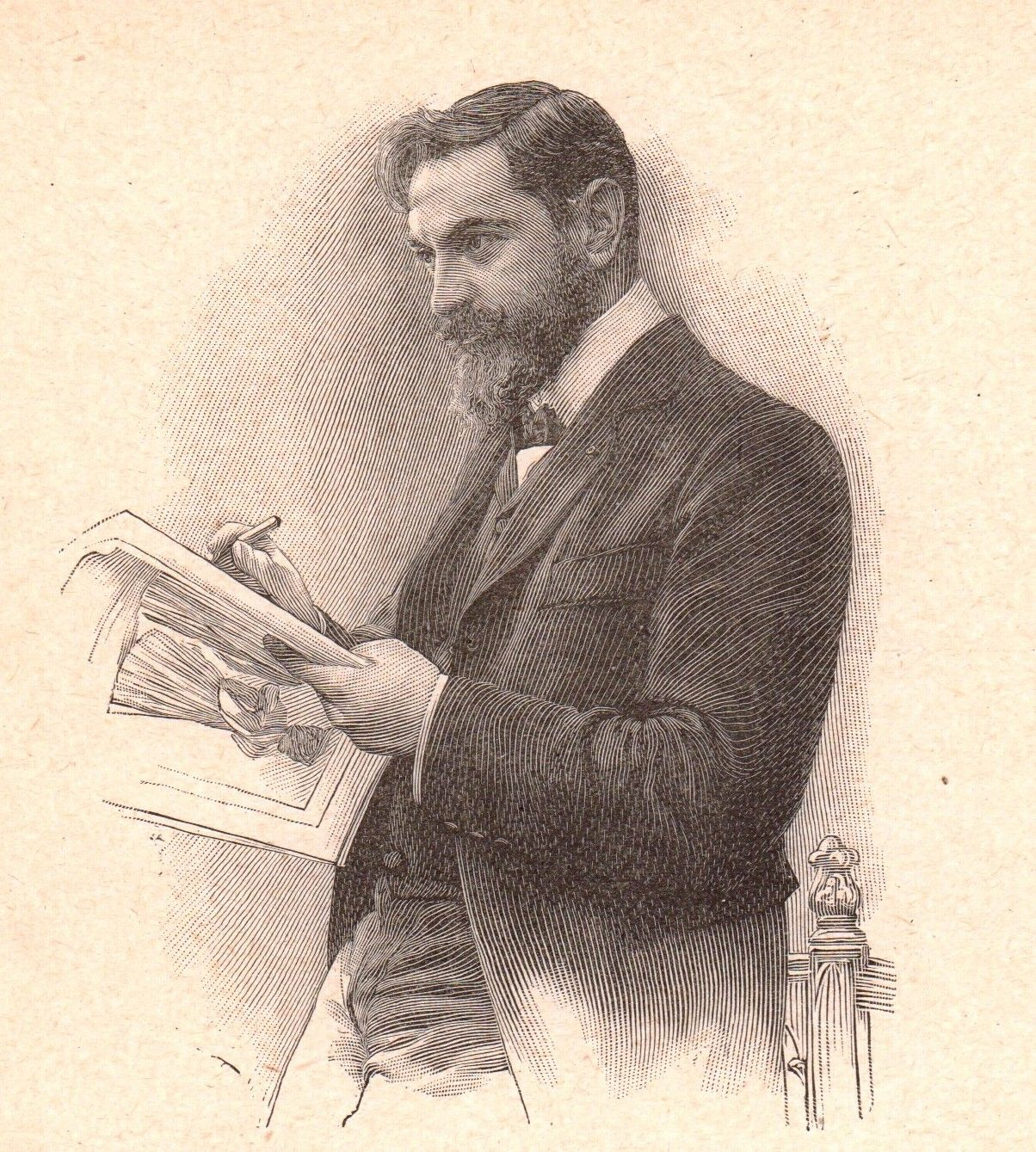
- Born: Maurice Louis Henri Neumont; 22 September 1868; 4th arrondissement of Paris, France
- Died: 10 February 1930 (aged 61); Montmartre, 18th arrondissement of Paris, France
- Awards: Knight of the Legion of Honour

Maurice Neumont was a French lithographer, painter, illustrator, and affichiste. Neumont created several well-known propaganda posters during World War I and published in notable journals such as Gil Blas and Le Courrier français. He also co-founded the salon des humoristes. He was a prolific contributor to the Parisian art scene and was honored for his distinguished career by being named a Knight of the Legion of Honour.

== Gallery ==
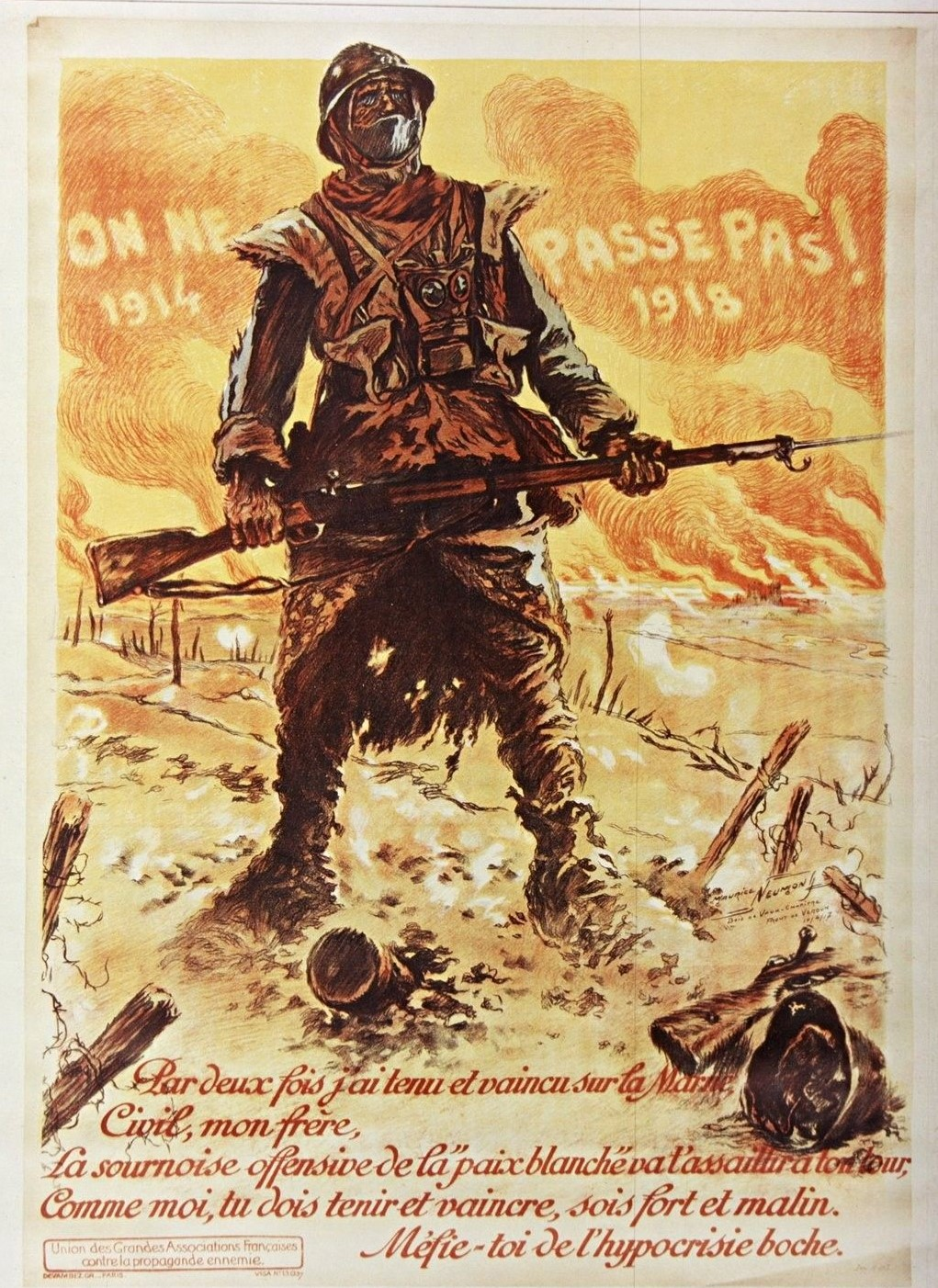
On Ne Passe Pas! (They shall not pass)

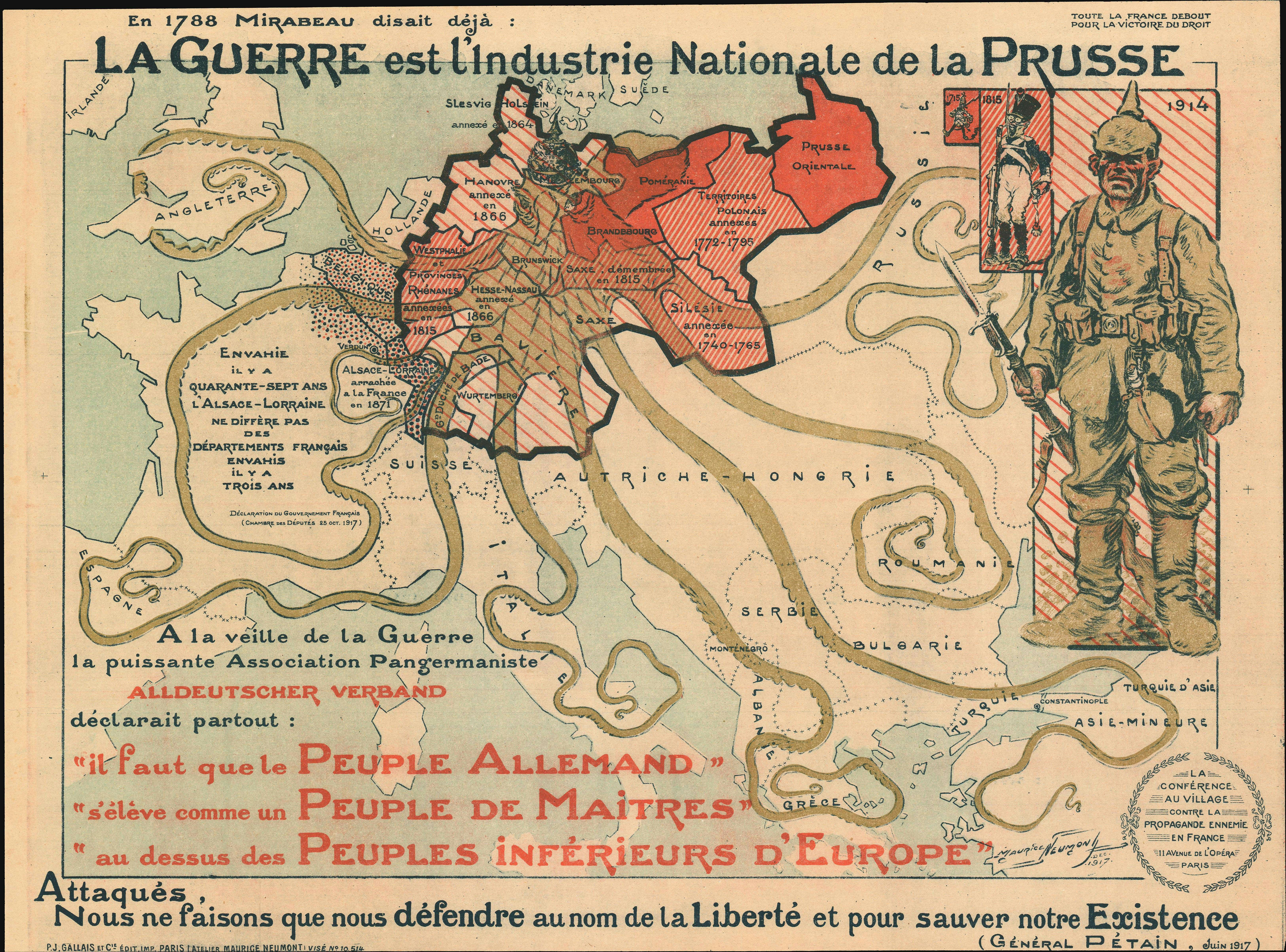

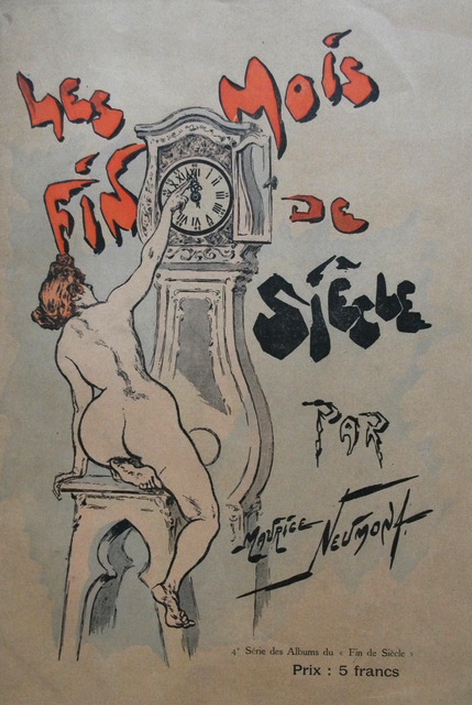

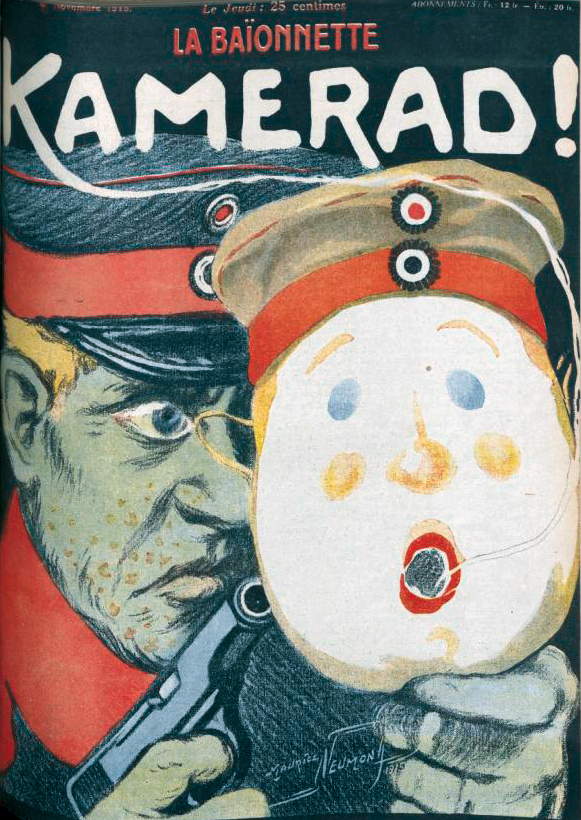

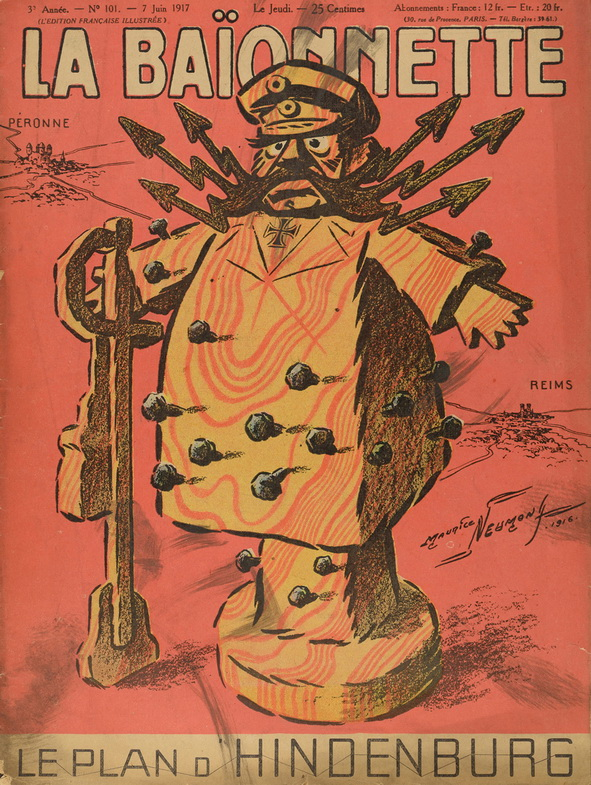

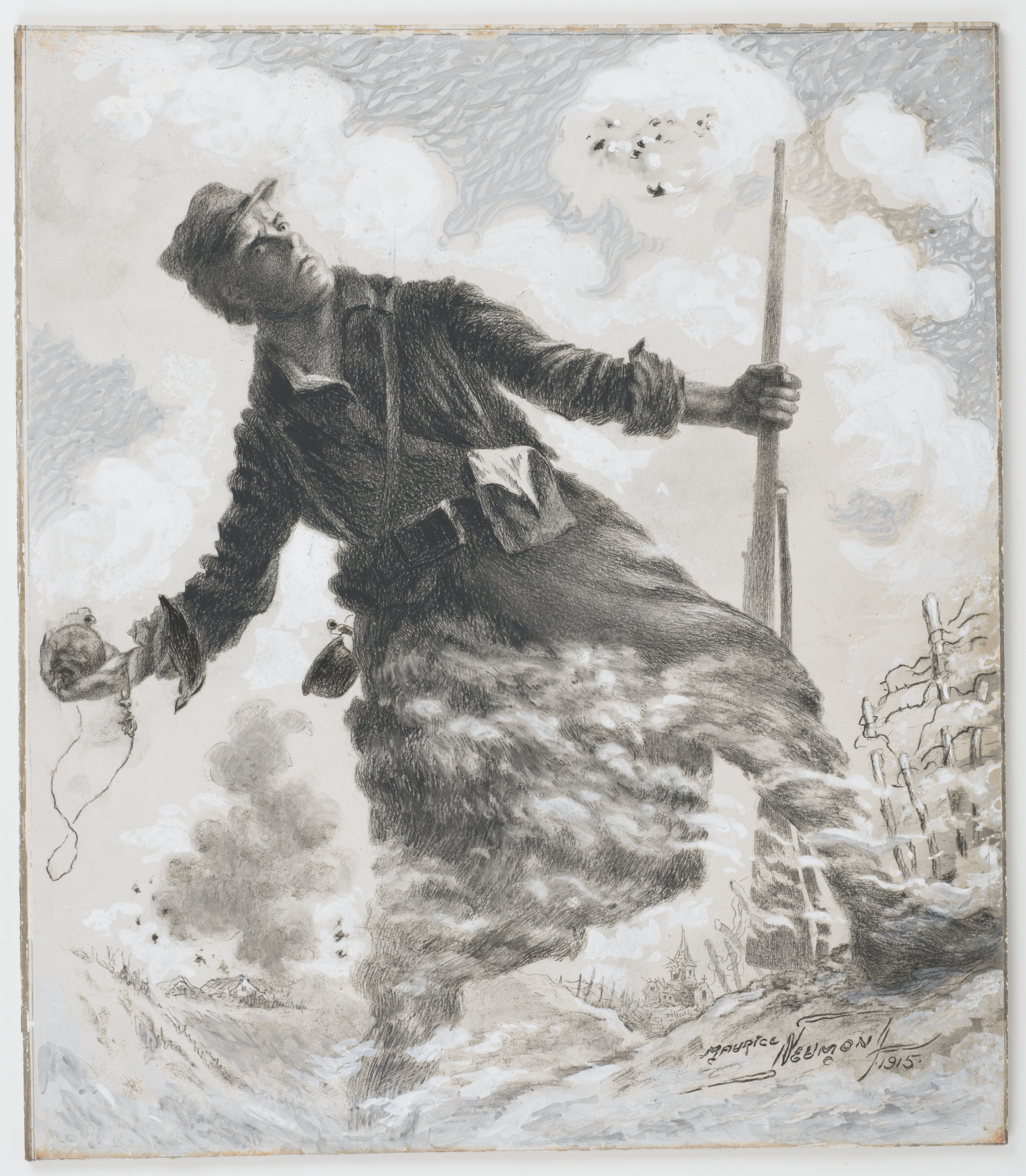

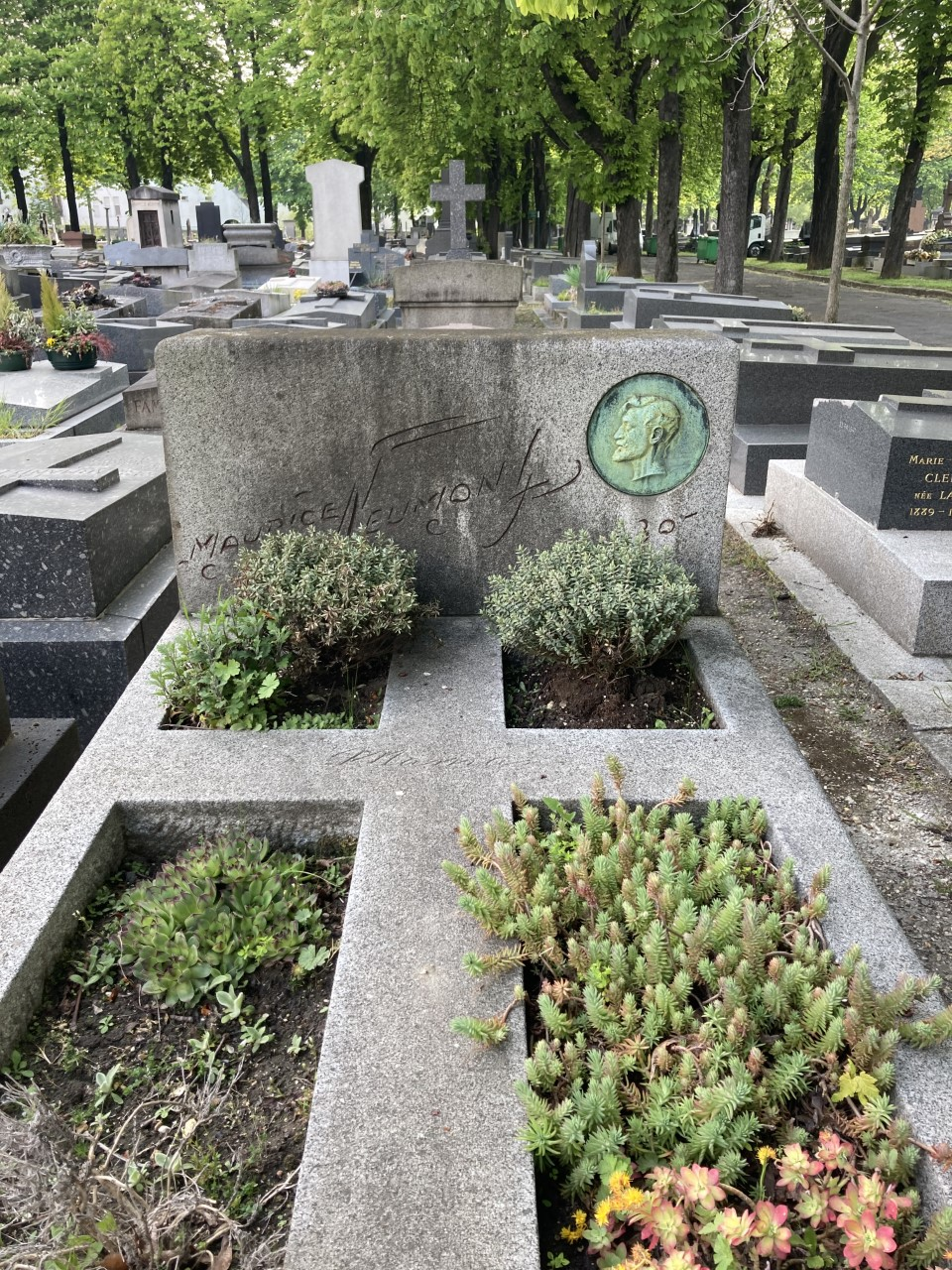
Neumont's grave in Paris

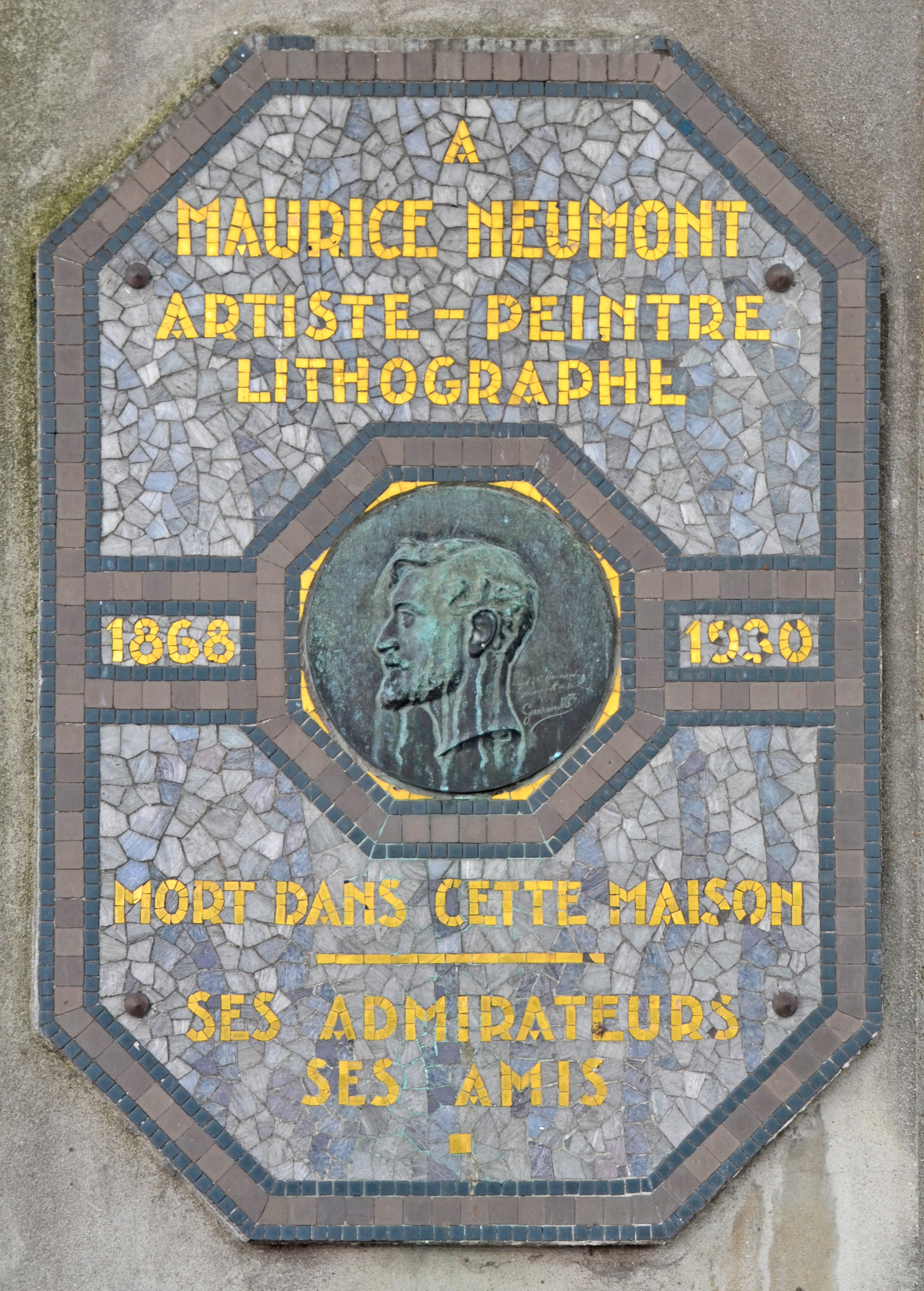
Plaque commemorating Neumont at 1 Place du Calvaire, Paris, inscribed with “To Maurice Neumont, Artist, Painter, Lithographer. 1868-1930. Died in this house. His admirers, his friends.”
