= Henriot =

Henriot (English: /ɒ̃ˈriːoʊ/, French: [ɑ̃ʁjo]) may refer to:

- Émile Henriot (chemist) (1885–1961), chemist
- Émile Henriot (writer) (1889–1961), novelist, literary critic and member of the Académie française
- François Hanriot (1761–1794), French leader and street orator of the French Revolution
- Henriette Henriot (1857–1944), French actress and model for Pierre-Auguste Renoir
- Jane Henriot (1878–1900), French actress
- Marcel Henriot (1896–1952), French World War I flying ace
- Henriot (caricaturist) (1857–1933), French caricaturist
- Henriot (champagne), a champagne producer
- Philippe Henriot (1889–1944), French politician in the 1930s and 1940s, and minister in Vichy France

== See also ==
- Hanriot (surname)
