= Émile Henriot =

Émile Henriot may refer to:

- Émile Henriot (writer) (1889–1961), French poet, novelist, essayist and literary critic
- Émile Henriot (chemist) (1885–1961), French chemist

== See also ==
- Henriot (disambiguation)
