= Firmin Gillot =

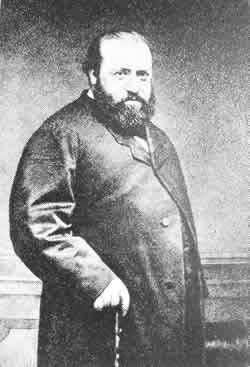
Firmin Gillot

Firmin Gillot (French: [fiʁmɛ̃ ɡijo]; 11 October 1819 Combres, France – 11 June 1872 Paris) was a French printmaker (engraver) and inventor.

== History ==
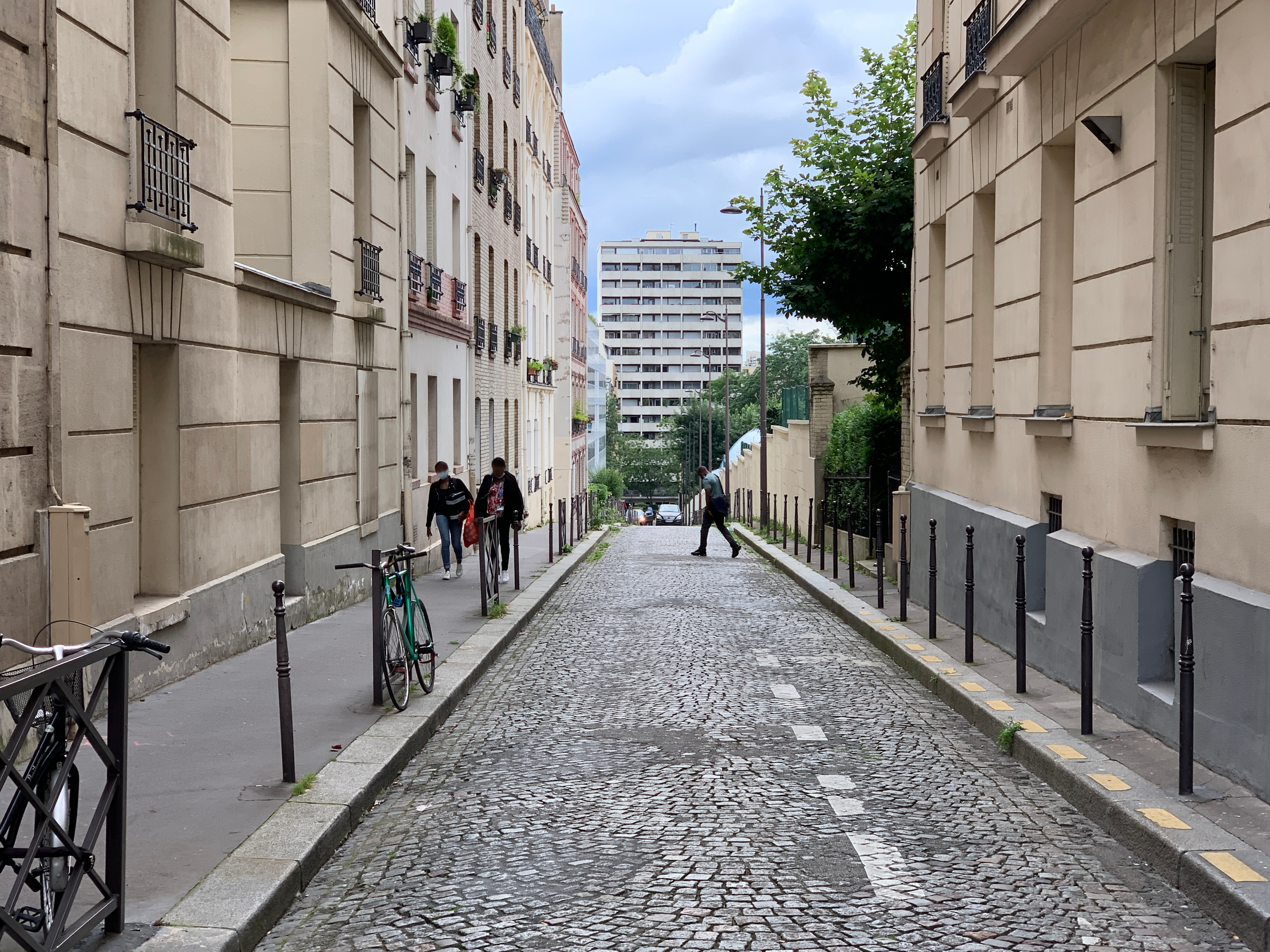
Rue Firmin Gillot, Paris

At the start of the 19th century, a technique gained popularity that involved transferring a drawing onto a lithographic stone from a special paper coated with a mix of starch and gelatin. This method, called autographic transfer, allowed artists to easily reproduce their drawings.

Firmin Gillot took this a step further. On March 21, 1850, he patented an idea: instead of transferring the image to a stone, he transferred it to a zinc plate. Then, using acid to etch the image, he created raised surfaces on the plate where the drawn lines were. This technique transformed the flat image into a printing plate that could be used for relief printing, similar to traditional typesetting methods.

This process, a zincography innovation, became known as gillotage. It was also known as paniconography and eventually evolved into what we now recognize as typographic photogravure. It allowed for the mass production of images and text, playing a key role in the development of modern printing techniques by creating a link between artistic lithography and commercial printing methods. This breakthrough made it easier to reproduce intricate illustrations alongside text in publications, making it a precursor to the image printing we see today in books and newspapers.

Gillot later invented a new process, also in relief, but nonphotographic.

== Firmin Gillot memorial street ==
In 1951 – during the 100th-year anniversary of Gillot's invention – Pierre de Gaulle (1897–1959) re-named rue de la Grotte after the inventor, rue Firmin-Gillot. Gillot's workshop was on this street; although, from 1863 to 1877, it was named rue Fondary, of Vaugirard, a former French commune that was annexed by Paris June 16, 1859.

== Firmin Gillot's son ==
Around 1870, Gillot's son, Charles Firmin Gillot (1853–1903), developed the Gillotage process (photomechanical). This process quickly predominated the illustrated newspapers and books of the period, such as for example: Le Charivari, Le Rire, L'Assiette au Beurre, Gil Blas, and many others.

Gillot's firm name in 1875 was V^{ve} Gillot & Fils. (Note: V^{ve} is an abbreviation for veuve, meaning widow – Mélanie Félicité Eugénie Josèphe Cordier (1823–1910) – indicating that the business is being run by the widow. Fils means son – Charles Firmin Gillot.) The address was 175, rue du Faubourg Saint-Martin, Paris.

== Bibliography ==
=== Secondary references ===
- Lorilleux, Charles (1827–1893) [in French] (1889). Traité de lithographie [Treatise on Lithography] (in French). La Maison Ch. Lorilleux & C^{ie}. pp. 19–20, 54, 160. Retrieved October 14, 2024. BnF 5743370d; BnF 33628924n; OCLC 2436573 (all editions).
1. Via Gallica (BnF Gallica).
2. Via HathiTrust (University of Chicago).
3. Via Google Books (University of Chicago).

=== Primary references ===
- Gillot, Firmin (1875). Album de gravure paniconographique et photogravure [Album of paniconographic engraving and photogravure]. Paris: V^{ve} Gillot & Fils – via BnF Gallica. OCLC 723980104 (all editions), 457872186; 1007423573, 63641481, and 8443594.
