= Chromotype =

Chromotype may refer to:

- Photo-crayotype
- Chromotypograph
