= Pierre Legendre =

Pierre Legendre may refer to:

- Pierre Legendre (historian), French historian and psychoanalyst
- Pierre Legendre (ecologist), Canadian numerical ecologist
