= Lucien Métivet =

French artist

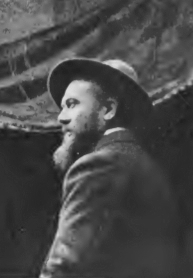
- Lucien Métivet
- Born: Lucien Marie François Métivet; January 19, 1863; Paris, France
- Died: July 16, 1932 (aged 69); Paris, France
- Other name: Luc
- Known for: Poster artist, painter, printmaker, cartoonist, illustrator, author

Lucien Marie François Métivet (January 19, 1863 - July 16, 1932) was a French poster artist, cartoonist, illustrator, and author who achieved notoriety during the Belle Epoque. Best known for his 1893 poster of the chanteuse Eugénie Buffet, he was also a popular cover artist for the Parisian humor magazine Le Rire and a frequent contributor of cartoons and illustrations to it and other magazines, including Journal amusant. He illustrated books by a number of prominent authors of the time and wrote at least two books of his own. Métivet was "a master in caricature, humorous illustration and lithographic techniques" who became "one of the most prominent illustrators of the 19th century."

== Biography ==
Métivet was born in Paris in 1863. He studied classical art before turning to popular art forms. While still in his twenties, Métivet illustrated, with Carlos Schwabe, an 1890 edition of Émile Zola’s novel Le Rêve (which had first appeared two years earlier).

Métivet's 1893 poster portraying Eugénie Buffet and promoting her appearances at the Café des Ambassadeurs was the first of two he would do for her. It was immediately recognized as extraordinary, and a contemporary critic noted that "Métivet’s talent is seen at its best in the Eugénie Buffet advertisements" which he deemed "worthy [of] a place amongst the best posters which have come from the hands of contemporary French artists.”

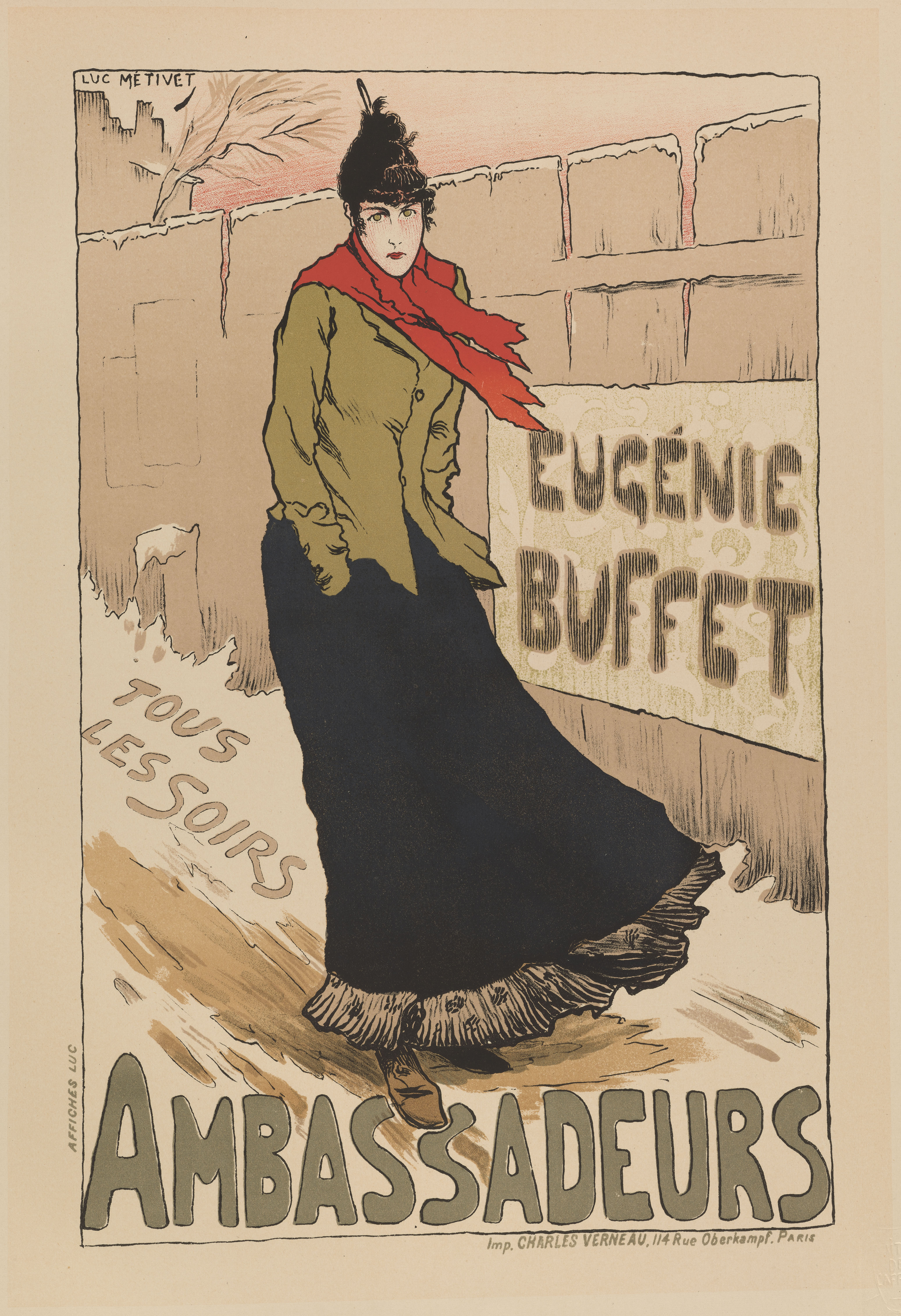
Poster for performances by Eugénie Buffet Published in Les Maîtres de l'Affiche

Métivet's first cover for the humor weekly Le Rire appeared on the magazine's fifth issue, December 8, 1894. Entitled “Salon du Cycle,” the image humorously celebrated the popularity of the bicycle, which was at the time a new force in daily life. Métivet became a frequent contributor, and his many appearances in the magazine allowed his satirical side to emerge. For example, a February 1896 cartoon sequence entitled Rayons indiscrets ("Indiscreet Rays") consisted of comic silhouettes that played on the concept of the x-ray (a new technology) to audacious effect. As one art historian has noted, "Métivet here harnessed an absolutely new way of seeing – notably one linked to the medical understanding of the body – to the predilection for fantasy and voyeurism that seems to have been current in the contemporary visual imagination.”

In July 1896 the Century Co. ran a contest in Paris for a poster design depicting Napoleon. Of twenty-two submissions from leading poster artists, Métivet's design was unanimously selected as the first-place winner. Famously, one of the other contestants, whose work Métivet won out over, was Toulouse-Lautrec. Métivet's Napoleon poster, however, has had its share of detractors, including one reviewer who disliked its reliance on symbols and declared: “The general public may approve of the design, but there is hardly a doubt that the artistic verdict will be ‘too much detail and mystery.’ Moreover, a poster which needs to be explained fails of its chief purpose."

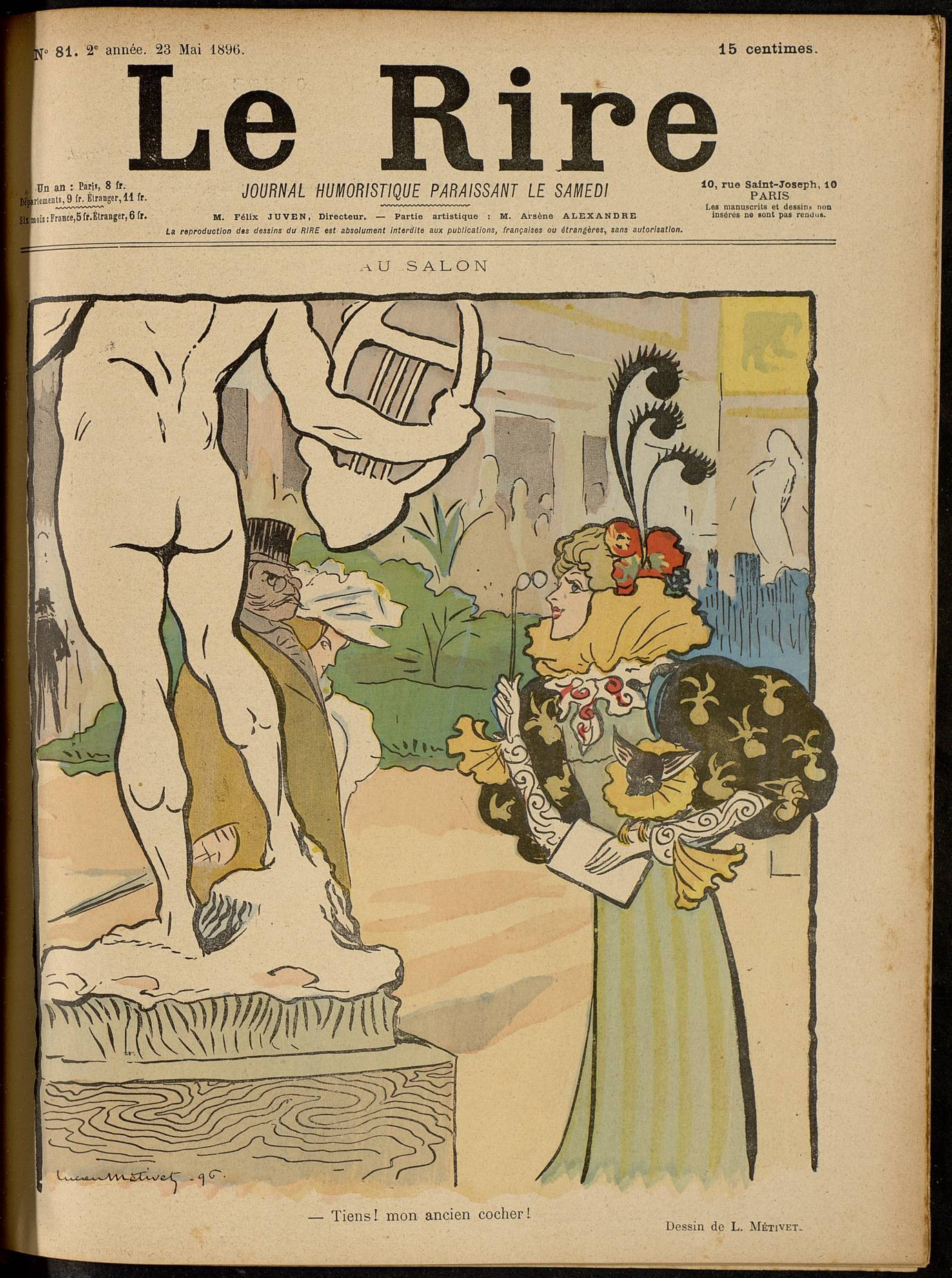
"At the Sculpture Exhibition"

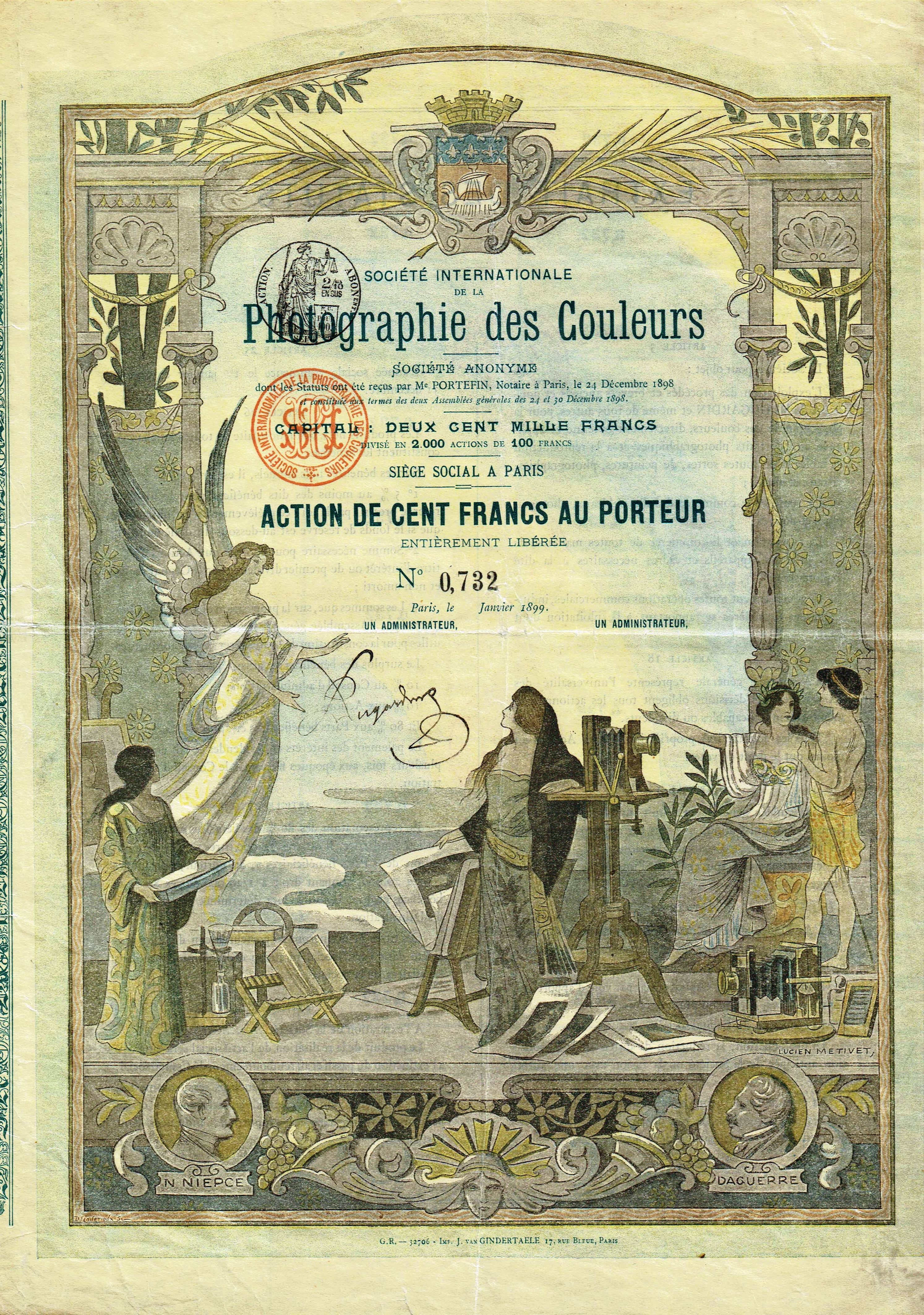
Share of the Soc. Internationale de la Photographie des Coleurs S. A., issued January 1899; designed by Lucien Métivet

Métivet's prolific output included illustrations for many books, which in the late 1890s included Catulle Mendès' L'homme orchestre (1896), Pierre Valdagne's Variations sur le meme air (1896), and Michel Leblanc's Voici de ailes! (1898). In 1898 Métivet also contributed “more than 100 frolicsome drawings" to Arsène Alexandre’s whimsical book about four fairies, Les Fées en train de plaisir and in 1900 he illustrated Michel Provins' Nos petits coeurs (1900). For the 1905 edition of Guy de Maupassant’s Clair de lune Métivet created dozens of drawings, and he later did dozens of erotic drawings for at least two books by author Pierre Louÿs, Les aventures du Roi Pausole and Les Chansons de Bilitis, which focused on the theme of lesbian lovers.

Historic securities collectors count documents like ”S. A. des Phosphates du Chéliff (Algérie)”, ”Compagnie Lyonnaise de Tramways”, ”Société en Participation du Navire-Express-Rouleurs Bazin”, ”Grands Moulins St-Pierre à Saint-Denis (Seine)”, ”Fabrica de Vidrios de Lamiaco SA” or “Société Internationale de la Photographie des Couleurs” for the highlights of every collection.

In 1907, the publisher of Le Rire launched another magazine, Fantasio, to which Métivet also contributed. Métivet remained active throughout the next two decades, his work often reflecting themes of politics and war during World War I, such as in the soldier magazine La Baïonnette. He published books of his own (including the satirical Jean-Qui-Lit et Snobinet and the later Délurette et Lambine) and in 1926 illustrated the humorous tales of Balzac and Pierre Legendre’s Au Fond du Maelstrom.

Métivet's accomplishments were honored by the French government when he was named Chevalier de la Légion d’honneur in 1923.

He died in Paris on July 16, 1932.
