= Marguerite Bellanger =

French courtesan

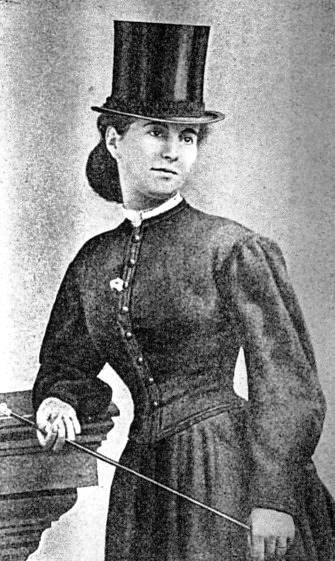
- Marguerite Bellanger around 1870 by Eugène Disdéri
- Born: Julie Justine Marine Lebœuf; 10 June 1838
- Died: 23 November 1886 (aged 48); Villeneuve-sous-Dammartin, France
- Occupations: Actress, courtesan.
- Known for: Mistress of Napoleon III

Marguerite Bellanger (10 June 1838 – 23 November 1886) was a French stage actress and courtesan. She was a celebrity of Second Empire France and known for her relationship with Napoleon III of France. She was often caricatured in contemporary press and is considered to be the model for Émile Zola's Nana. A candy is also named after her. She was reputedly the most universally loathed of Napoleon III's mistresses, though perhaps his favorite. She outlived Napoleon's deposition in 1870 and died in 1886 aged 48.

== Early life ==
Marguerite Bellanger was born Julie Justine Marine Lebœuf on 10 June 1838 in Saint-Lambert-des-Levées, Maine-et-Loire to François Lebœuf and Julie Hanot. Born into poverty, she began working as a laundress in Saumur at the age of 15.

After an affair with a lieutenant opened her eyes to the wider world, she became an acrobat and trick rider in a provincial circus, she travelled to Paris where she made her debut as an actress at the theater La Tour d'Auvergne, under the name of Marguerite Bellanger (the surname of an uncle).

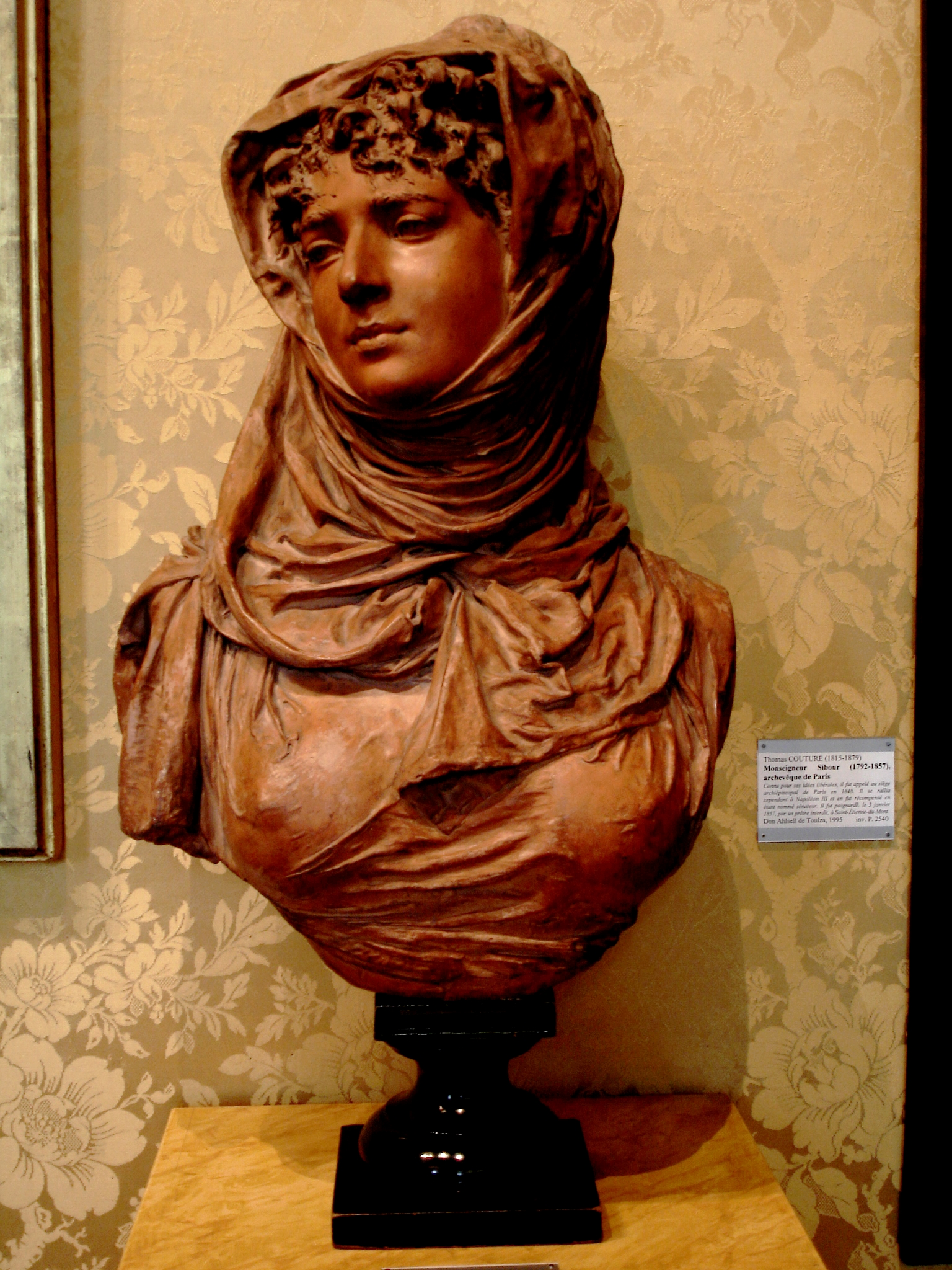
Marguerite Bellanger

Although her acting talent was limited, she was cunning. She became one of the most sought-after courtesans of all Paris. She led a princely lifestyle, and the climax of her gallant life took place in the years 1862–1866. She is reported to have said: "It is very nice, Paris, but it is only habitable in the beautiful districts ... In the others, there are too many poor!" according to Le Rappel of 16 April 1871. Author and playwright, Ludovic Halévy, is reputed to have said that Bellanger had the "daintiest feet in Paris".

Her celebrity status was such that she became a figure in the literary and artistic world. Zola quoted her as a friend of Nana.

She was photographed in man's suit: to do this, she had asked permission from the police department.

Bellanger was a favourite model of the sculptor Albert-Ernest Carrier-Belleuse, who represented her as an allegory of spring in an elegant terracotta bust in which is today in the Musée Carnavalet in Paris.

In a painting by Édouard Manet in 1863, Olympia, the artist endeavoured to evoke an odalisque, who receives a bouquet of flowers brought by her maid. According to Phyllis A. Floyd's study, The Puzzle of Olympia, he gave the painting the features of Marguerite Bellanger.

== Mistress of Napoleon III ==
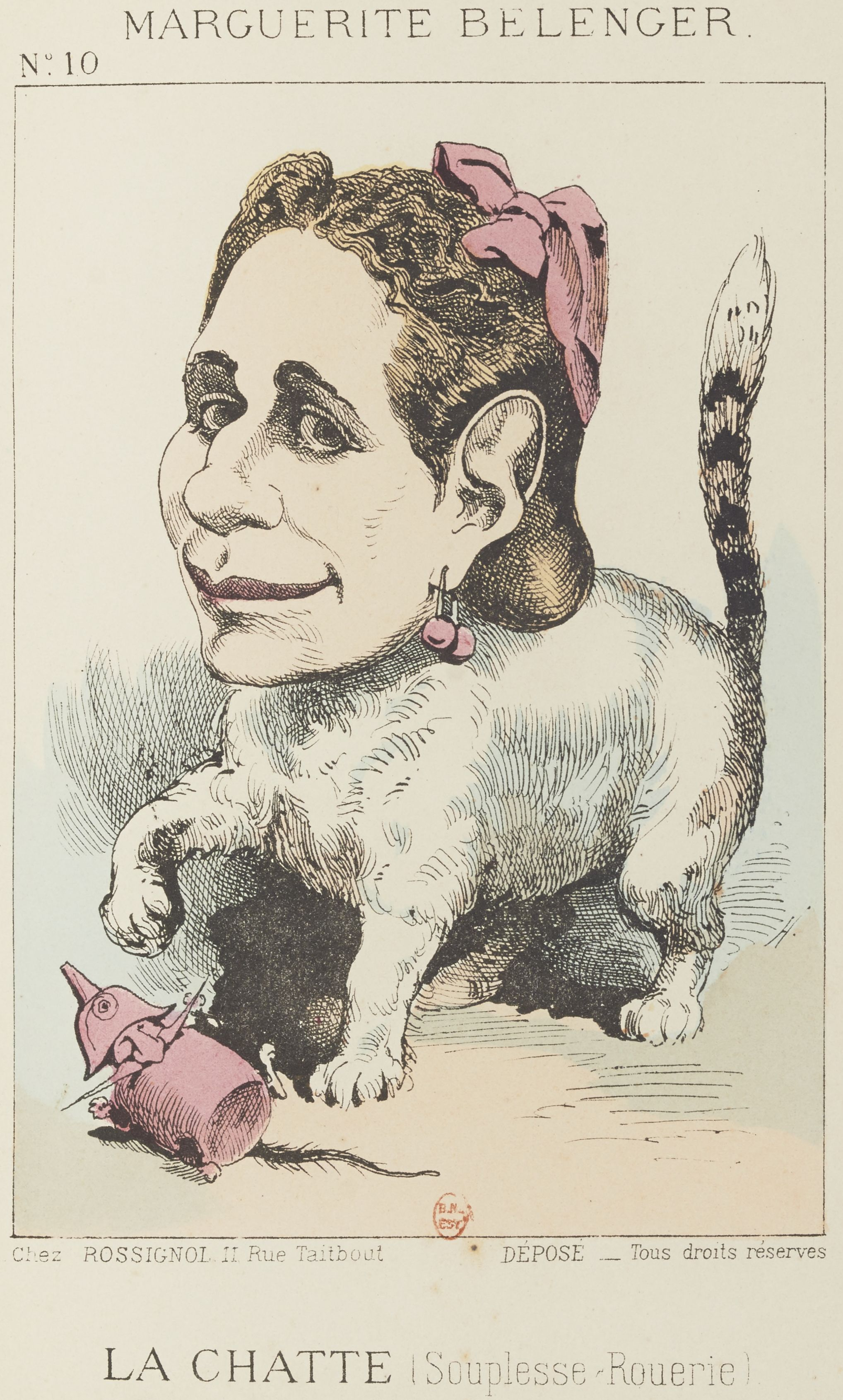
Paul Hadol's caricature of Bellanger toying with Napoleon

In June 1863, while on a carriage ride in Saint-Cloud Park, Emperor Napoleon III spotted Bellanger sheltering from the rain beneath a tree. Napoleon was bewitched by his new encounter.

Marguerite Bellanger become the mistress of the Emperor. Soon, with the knowledge of all including the Empress Eugénie, she followed him on private and official trips.

Amongst his numerous presents, the Emperor gave her two houses, one at 57 rue des Vignes, Passy, the other at Saint-Cloud, in the park of Montretout, which had a back door to the gardens of the castle.

In February 1864, Marguerite Bellanger gave birth to a son; whom she named Charles Jules Auguste François Marie Leboeuf.

After the birth, Bellanger retired for a while to rue de Launay in Villebernier and received a pension. In November 1864, the Emperor offered "Margot" the castle of Villeneuve-sous-Dammartin, near Meaux. The Emperor also gave the child a boarding house and the castle of Mouchy, in the Oise, which he had bought very discreetly some time before. Bellanger became usufructuary of the property.

Always seductive, Bellanger still attracted men when she settled in Villeneuve-sous-Dammartin at the end of 1864. Among her lovers were General de Lignières and, according to some sources, Léon Gambetta.

She was the subject of caricatures and gossip. Paul Hadol, in his series of caricatures on the "Imperial Menagerie", portrayed her as a cat.

Her affair with the emperor continued during the Franco-Prussian War, and even during his captivity in Westphalia. In 1873, when the emperor died in exile in England, she traveled there to mourn her "dear lord".

== Later life ==
At the fall of the Empire, she again traveled to England and married William Louis Kulbach, a British army officer. The presence of the couple William Kulbach and Marguerite Bellanger is recorded in Monchy-Saint-Éloi (Oise), France in the census of 1872.

== Death ==
Marguerite Bellanger died at the age of 48 on 23 November 1886 after contracting a cold during a walk in the park of the castle at Villeneuve-sous-Dammartin.

== Cultural heritage ==
=== Filmography ===
Bellanger's character appears in Christian-Jaque's film Nana (1955), in which her character is performed by Nicole Riche.

== Autobiographies ==
- Bellanger, Marguerite (1882). Confessions de Marguerite Bellanger. Mémoires anecdotiques (in French). librairie populaire.
- Bellanger, Marguerite (1900). Les Amours de Napoléon III, mémoires de Marguerite Bellanger, sa maîtresse (in French). P. Fort.

== Bibliography ==
- Aubry, Octave (1931). Eugénie, Empress of the French. J.B. Lippincott.
- Curry, T (1871). The secret documents of the Second empire, found in the Tuileries and ministries in Paris after the flight of the empress, tr. by T. Curry. W Tweedie.
- Friedrich, Otto (1993). Olympia: Paris in the Age of Manet. Simon & Schuster. ISBN 9780671864118.
- Houbre, Gabrielle (2006). Le livre des courtisanes: archives secrètes de la police des moeurs, 1861-1876 (in French). Tallandier. ISBN 9782847343441.
- Janoray, Charles; Champion, Jean-Loup (2003). A Golden Age of French Sculpture 1850-1900: Exhibition, May 5-May 30, 2003. Charles Janoray LLC.
- Kracauer, Siegfried (1938). Orpheus in Paris: Offenbach and the Paris of His Time. Knopf.
- Lambert, Susan (1971). The Franco-Prussian War and the Commune in caricature, 1870-71: catalogue of a collection of prints in the possession of the Department of Prints and Drawings of the Victoria and Albert Museum. Victoria and Albert Museum.
- Loliee, Frederic; Ivimy, Alice M (1907). Women of the second empire: chronicles of the court of Napoleon III. John Lane.
- Loliée, Frédéric; O'Donnell, Bryan (1910). The Gilded Beauties of the Second Empire. Brentano's.
- Markham, Felix Maurice Hippisley (1975). The Bonapartes. Weidenfeld and Nicolson. ISBN 9780297769286.
- Ridley, Jasper Godwin (1980). Napoleon III and Eugénie. Viking Press. ISBN 9780670504282.
- The Bookman. Vol. 2. Dodd, Mead and Co. 1909.
