= Paul Hadol =

French illustrator, draftsman and caricaturist

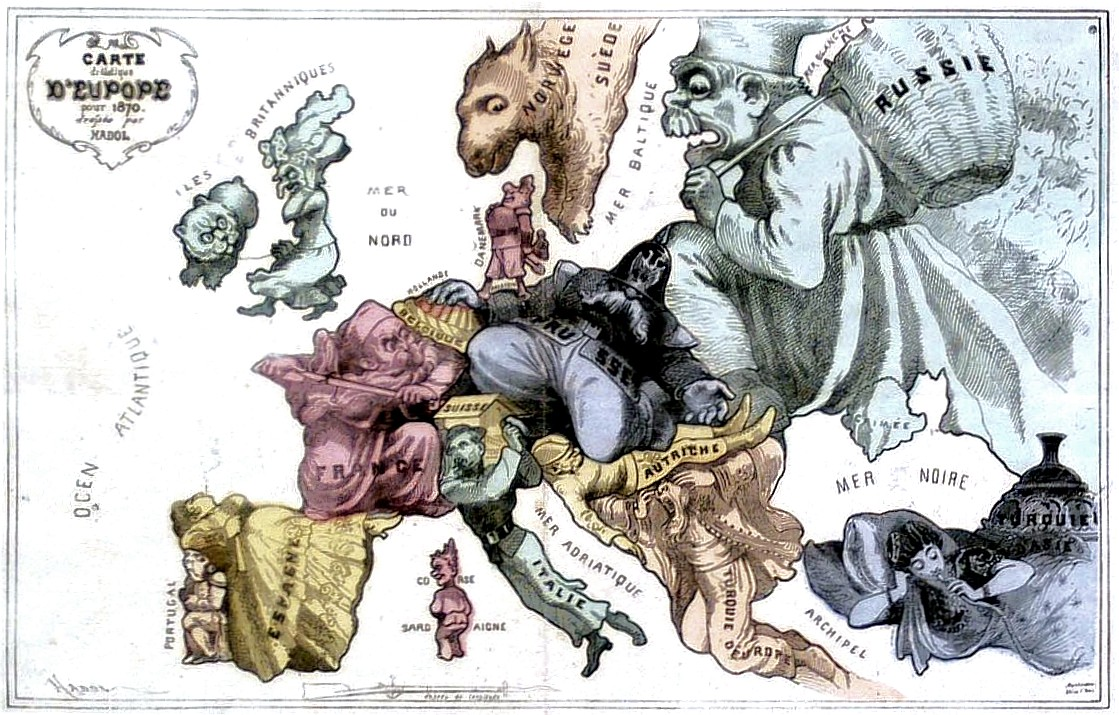
A satirical cartoon map of Europe in 1870 by Hadol

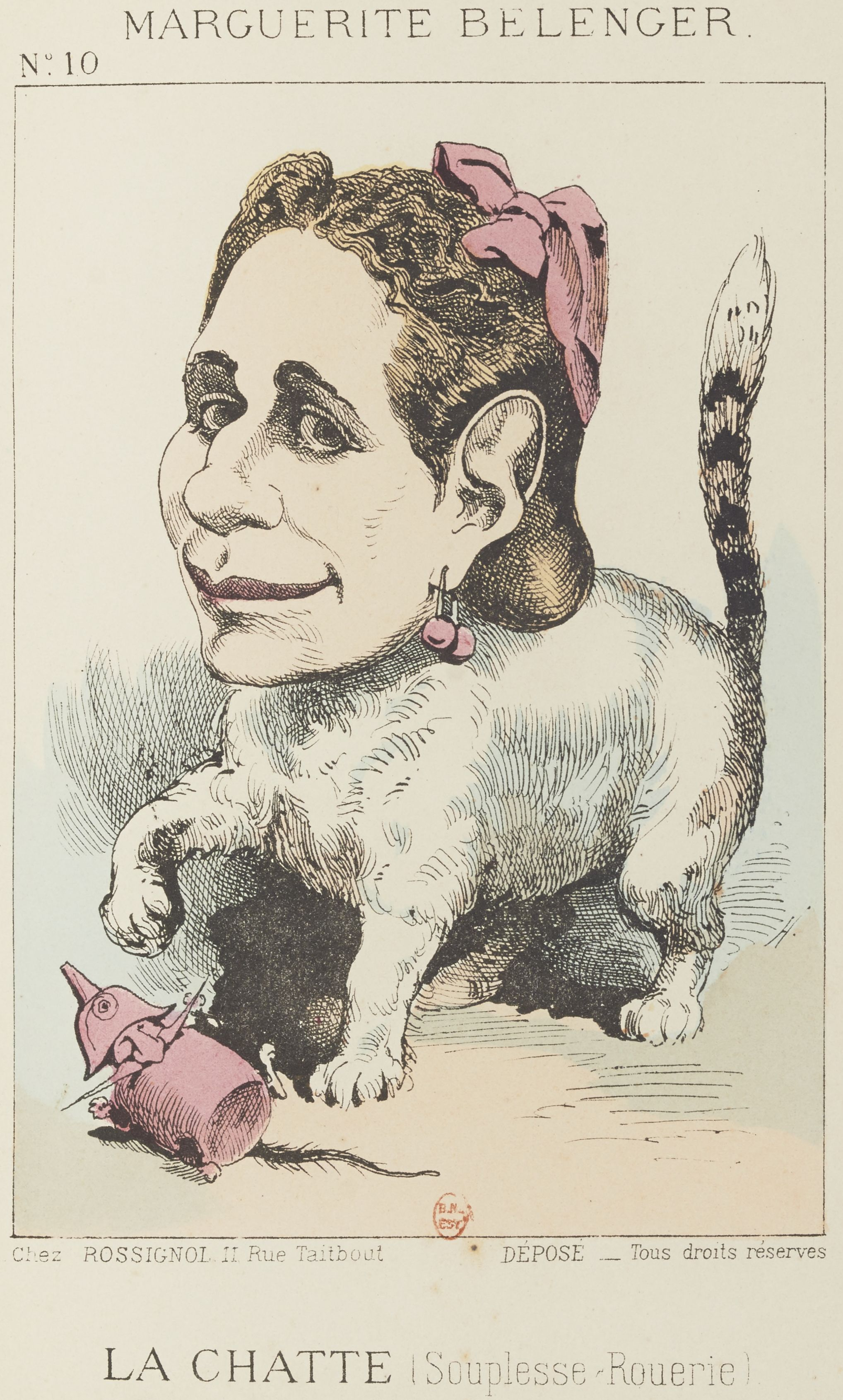
Caricature of Marguerite Bélenger. The caption reads La chatte (Souplesse-Rouerie), meaning 'The Cat (Nimbless-Cunning)'.

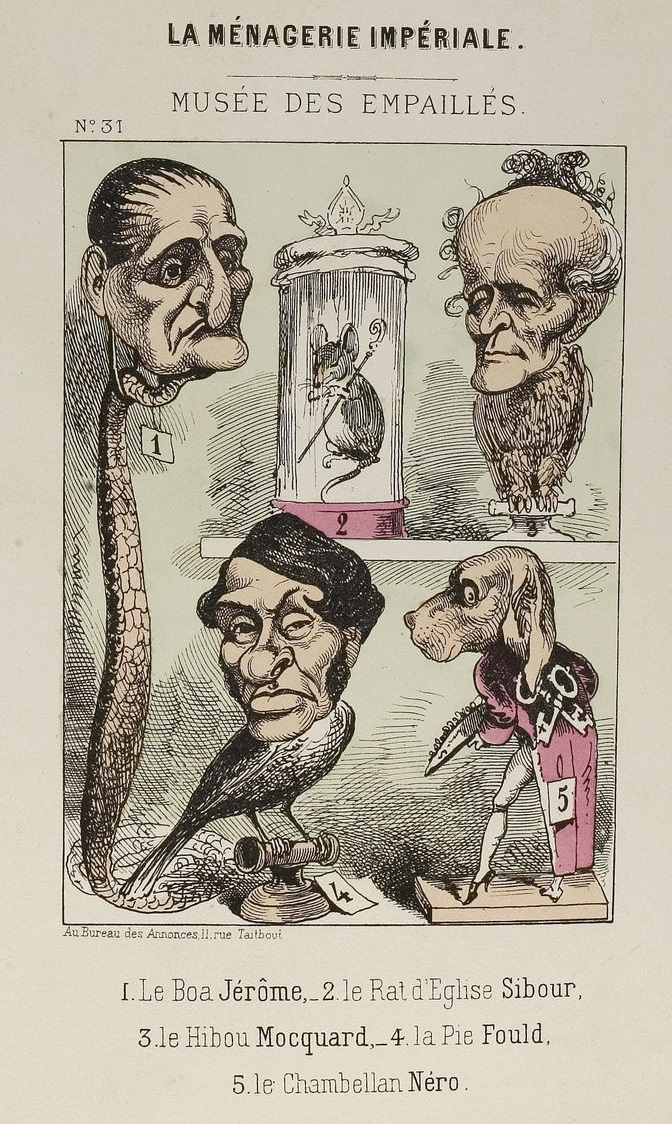
Ménagerie impériale

Paul Hadol (26 February 1835 in Remiremont – 26 November 1875 in Paris) was a French illustrator, draftsman and caricaturist.

Hadol collaborated with periodicals such as Le Gaulois, Le Journal Amusant, High Life, Le Charivari, Le Monde comique, La Vie Parisienne and L'Eclipse (under his real name) and with Mailly and Baillard under the pseudonym White.

A former customs employee, he illustrated novels, theater posters, and satire series (Actualités (Actualities), Mon Musée des Souverains (My Museum of Sovereigns)), which portrayed the political rulers of his period.

During the 1870 war he published La Ménagerie impériale (The Imperial Zoo) - caricatures which placed the heads of members of the disgraced Bonaparte family and their conspirators on the bodies of animals. The series begins with the former Emperor Napoléon III as a vulture, clutching in his claws the bleeding body of France. He is described by the caption as cowardly and ferocious.

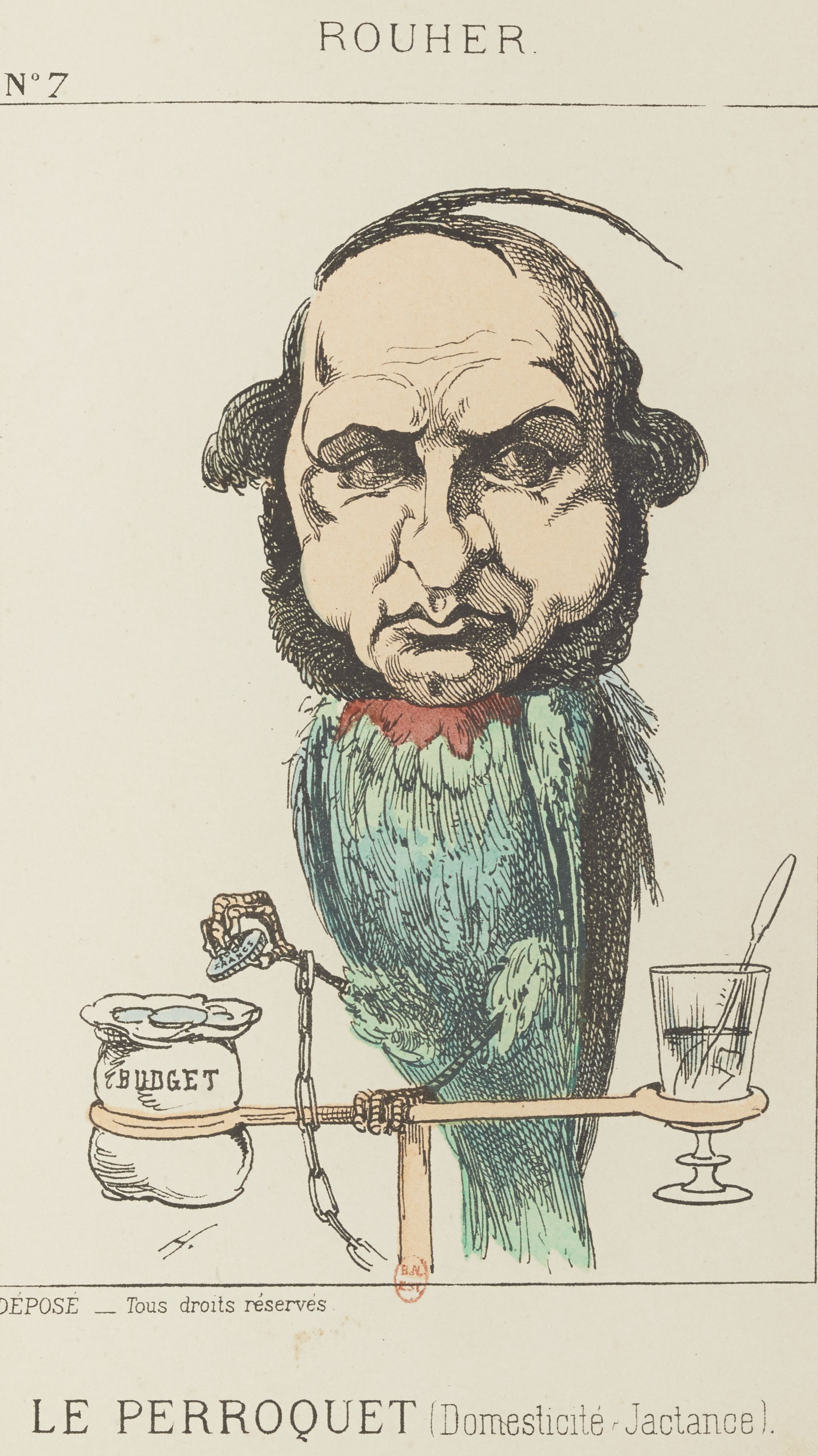
Eugène Rouher

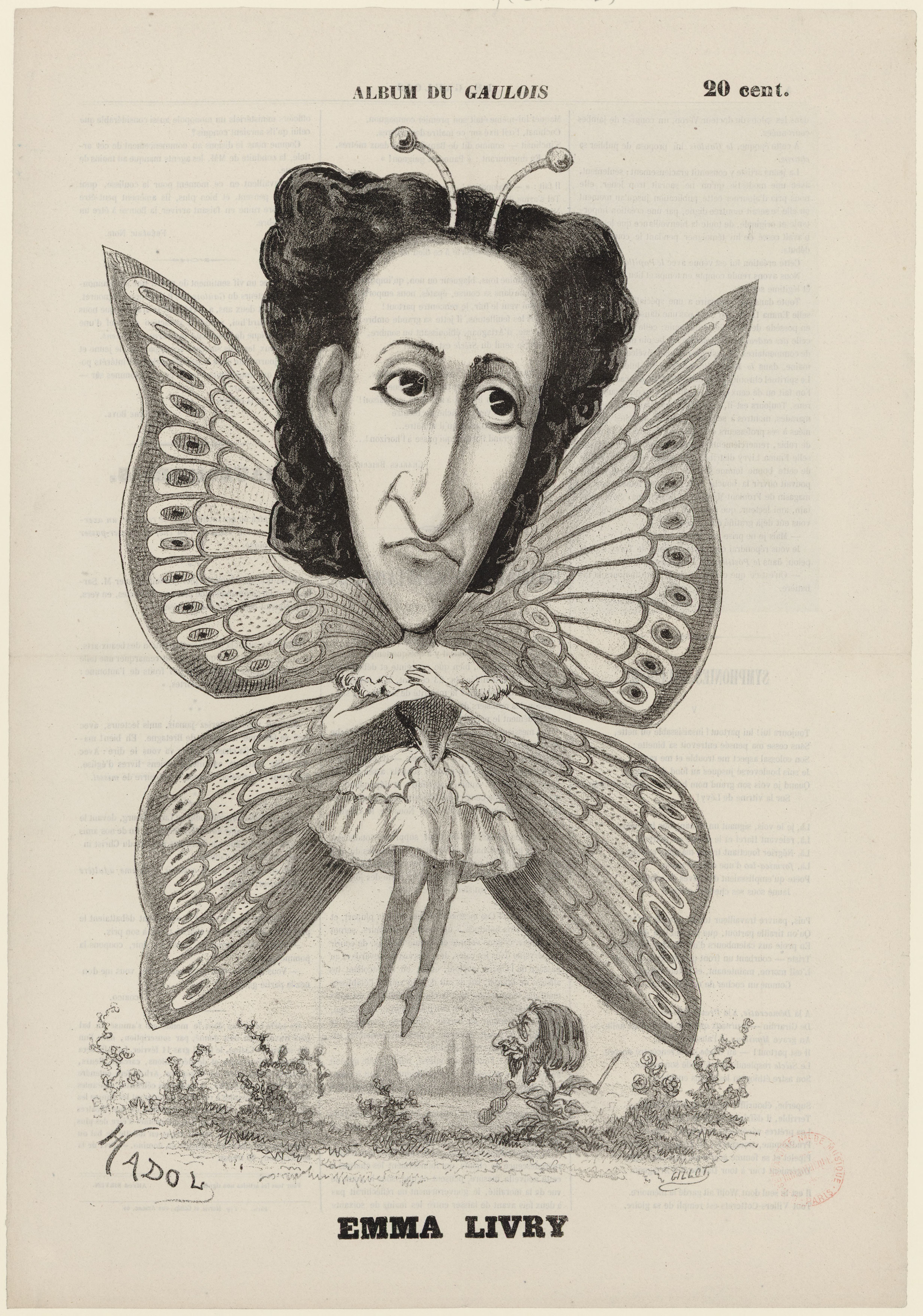
Emma Livry

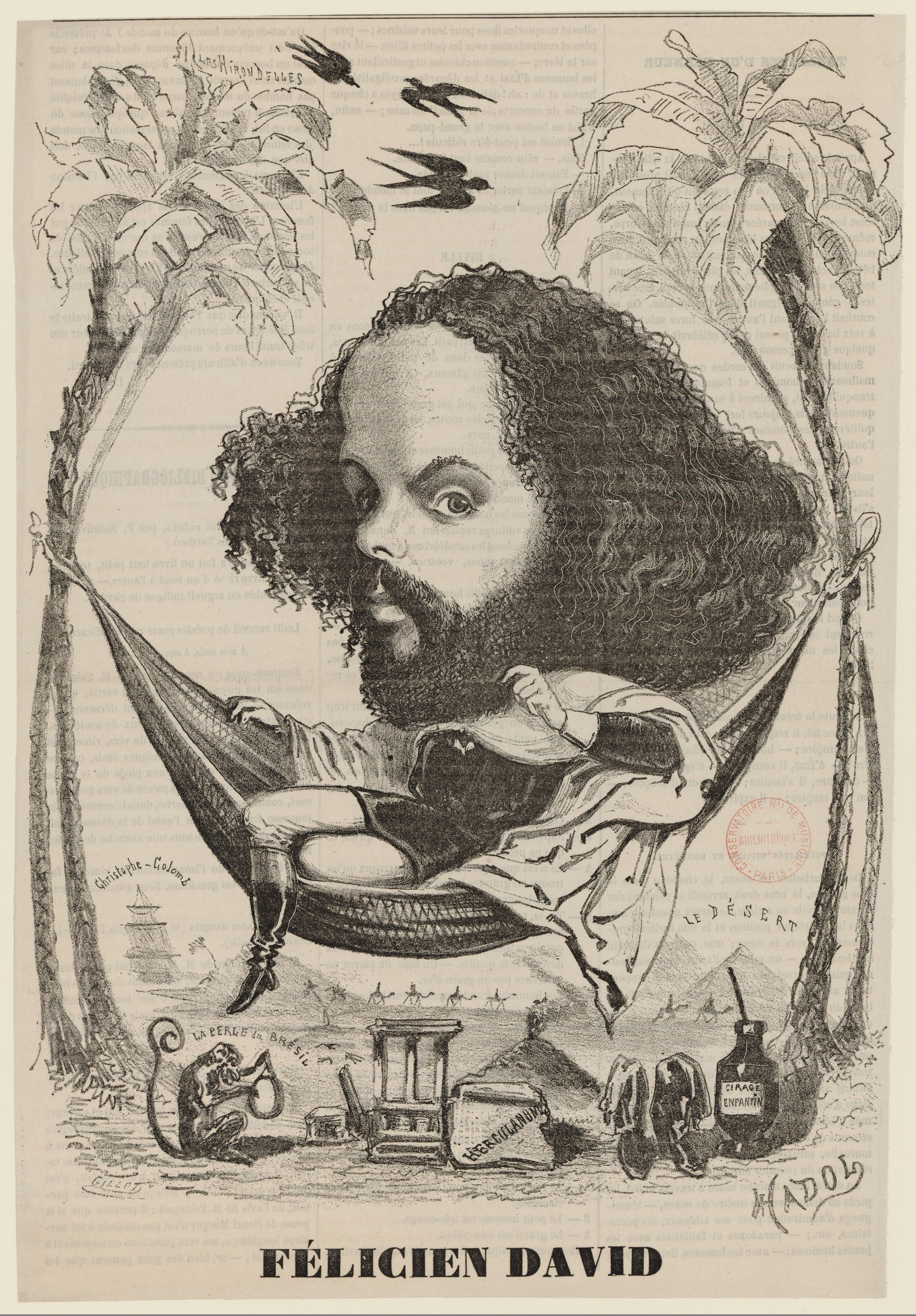
Félicien-César David

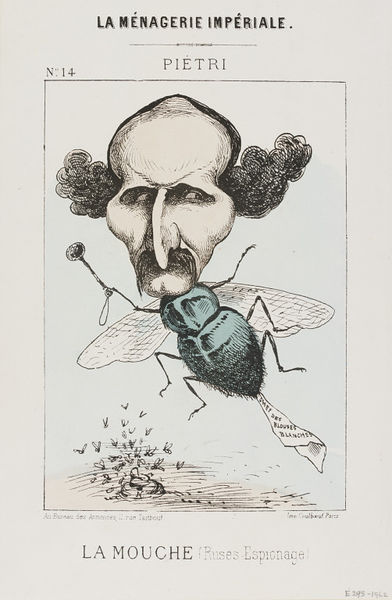
Emile Joseph-Marie Piétri
