= Chromotypograph =

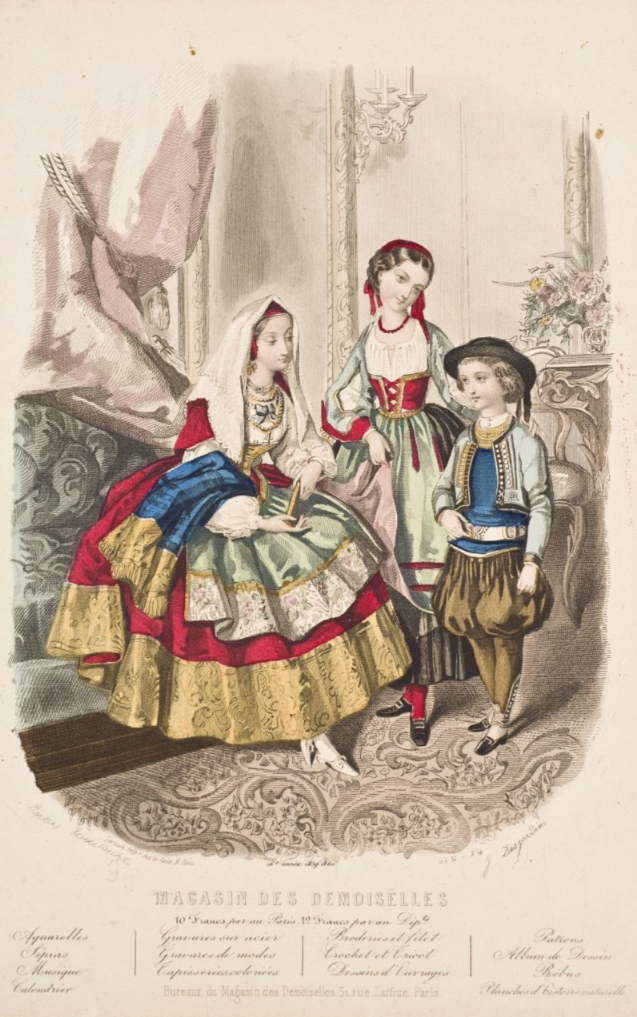
Chromotypography by J. Desjardins after a design of Anaïs Toudouze, for Le Magasin des demoiselles, vol. 16 (1859-1860)

Chromotypograph refers to any number of obsolete graphic arts or printing processes which used cold and warm rinse etching baths to create surfaces by which color images could be relief printed from zinc plates in the letterpress manner.

Such processes, as pioneered by Firmin Gillot represent a prototyping and experimental stage between the manual and process printing eras and are characterized by their utilization of various hand-originated textures and photographically transferred tones or outlines, which when combined with other color plates produced in a like manner could produce continuous tone color images unlike those found in similar technologies such as chromolithography.

Chromotypograph is the preferred description for a number of process which include but are not limited to photo color relief, gillotage, chromotype, color relief etching, zincography, chromoxylography, color line block, glyptotype, Dallastint, Dallastype.
