= Gaston Noury =

French painter and poster artist

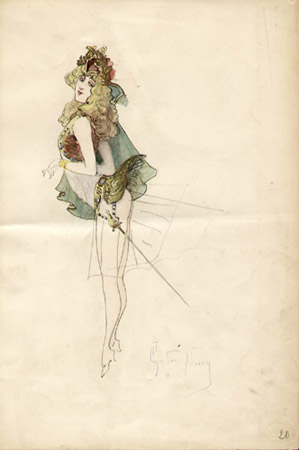

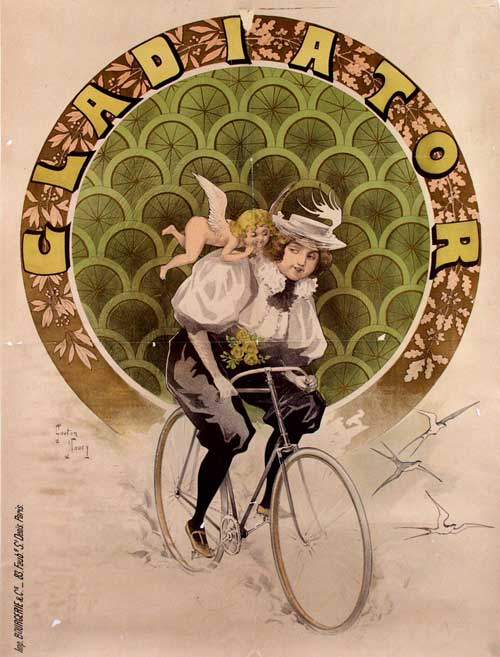

Gaston Noury (17 December 1866 in Elbeuf, Normandy – 21 September 1936 Le Havre, Normandy) was a French painter, poster artist, illustrator, cartoonist and theatrical costume designer, working in Le Havre and Paris, where he settled around 1889. His prolific output covered a wide variety of subjects and his images were used for posters, books, postcards, songbooks, genre scenes and fashion plates. He provided illustrations for magazines such as La Chronique parisienne, Saint-Nicolas, Gil Blas illustré, Journal amusant (1889–1890), and Les Hommes d'aujourd'hui.

Noury grew up in Elbeuf where his grandfather was founder and director of the local museum.

Noury designed costumes for the Moulin Rouge and Ambassadeurs in the Montmartre district. Most of these costume drawings are dated 1910. The costumes are both childishly innocent and provocative - floral designs and fabrics with seductive cutouts showing legs, midriff, cleavage and sometimes bare breasts. The drawings combine pencil and watercolour washes, portraying young women with stylised faces and delicate hands and feet.

== Bibliography ==
- Bénézit, E. Dictionnaire critique et documentaire des Peintres, Sculpteurs, Dessinateurs et Graveurs. France: Librairie Gründ, 1966. Vol. 6, p. 389.
- "Biographies of the Postcard Artists". Vintage Postcards.com.
- "Les Collections". Musée Christian Dior. 2005.
