= Sacha Zaliouk =

French painter (1887–1971)

Sacha Zaliouk, born Alexander Davidovich Zaliouk (Cyrillic: Александр Давидович Залюк or Александр Давидович Цалюк) (1887–1971), was a Russian-born illustrator and sculptor, from a Jewish family in Radomysl (now Ukraine). The Zaliouks were businessmen, artists and musicians from the Zhitomir region from early in the 19th century. Many of them were fluent in both Russian and French.

== Early life ==
His artistic career began in Odessa, where he had moved with his mother and 3 siblings. His father was a notary and scribe in the Russian army and worked as a non-academic lawyer, but died prematurely of a brain tumor in his late thirties. Although his mother had little education herself, she supported the family by renting rooms in their home, first in Radomysl, then in Odessa. Sacha was able to get a public education in drawing and completed the university level College of Fine Arts in Odessa, while participating in local exhibitions and contributing to Russian language publications, such as Крокодил, "crocodile". Although he never mentioned this to me, some have said that he spent a month studying at the St Petersberg Academy of Fine Arts until he was let go for exceeding the Jewish quota in that institution.

Sacha moved to Paris, France in about 1910, working among the many immigrant artists described later as "L'école de Paris". As with many Russian émigré, he was introduced to the artistic community by Maxim Gorky. Sacha studied there under Rafael Collin & Francois Flameng at the École des Beaux-Arts, married in 1914 to Berthe Faeige Lerner (French-born, 27 December 1887 – 1 October 1964) and enlisted in the French army, working his way up to Artillery Captain for which he was awarded French citizenship.

== Career ==
Although his early paintings looked back at his youth in the Ukraine, in 1919 he exhibited 50 paintings at "Au Tableau d'Art" reflecting the war years and with portraits of Parisiens, after which he was well known in Montparnasse, earning the moniker of "le Montparno des Montparnos". He painted many famous models, including Kiki de Montparnasse and Josephine Baker. Although always painting, he supported his family in the post World War I years by working as a humoristic illustrator for French magazines – usually with a sexual theme – such as Fantasio, Sourire, Journal amusant, Eros, and especially La Vie Parisienne. He also sculpted human faces from walnuts.

He was a founding member of La Horde de Montparnasse (The Horde), which was formed to popularize artists of Montparnasse (Bayard). Sacha was involved in creating invitation posters & decorating the sets for their annual fundraising balls, which supported struggling young immigrant artists. Members of the Horde frequented the famous coffee house La Rotunde, where they hobnobbed with the likes of Russian Bolshevik exiles, Henry Miller, Picasso, Modigliani, and Max Jacob. Sacha said he was very close to Amedeo Modigliani. When the Zaliouk-Lerner family purchased a family plot at Pere Lachaise cemetery for the sudden, premature death of Sacha's only daughter in 1925, they chose a spot only a few feet away from Modi's resting place.

Sacha befriended Fougita early after arriving in Paris, making several portraits of him. He took coffee with Ilya Ehrenburg in 1924 and his table often included Russian artists and intellectuals. When the cafe La Coupole was about to open in 1927, the owner invited Alexandre Auffray to help decorate the many then-bare columns; Auffray collected 31 Montparnasse artists, including Sacha, to paint them. A photo of Sacha with several fellow artists adorns the back wall of La Coupole even today. A movie short, Montparnasse 1929, was made by Eugene Deslaw, in which Deslaw incorporated over a hundred brief looks of this artist quarter, its cafes, many artists, including Sacha (and several of his drawings), Fougita, Marie Vassilliev (AKA Vassillieva), Samuel Granovsky "the cowboy of Montparnasse". Deslaw & those mentioned all were émigrés from RussoUkraine. All those identified in the movie were known close friends of Sacha.

Sacha was a prolific artist up until World War II, when the German occupation and Vichy France limited his professional activities, but he & his wife survived the war while losing his closest artist friend, Samuel Granovsky, to the Nazi concentration camps. Following World War II, there were continued economic hardships for artists, but he continued to paint, with support from his sister's family in America and a nephew in Israel. His late work included both realistic scenes and a venture into surrealism. When he suffered a devastating stroke in the late 1960s, he was hospitalized in a weakened condition. After some recovery, a former student, Henri Engel de Salm, placed him in a nursing home and took possession of over 800 drawings and paintings from his studio on Rue du Moulin Vert, many of which he sold at auction, through June 28, 2005 (Bretagne Encheres, Rennes). Sacha died peacefully at the Hospice on Rue Notre Dame des Champs in 1971 in the heart of Montparnasse, where he had continued to sketch until the end. The paintings had been promised to Sacha's family, which had helped support him for 30 years, but de Salm claimed a promise to keep all the Zaliouk collection together for a retrospective exposition in Paris, a promise that was never kept.

== Sources ==
- Bayard, Jean Emile Montparnasse Hier et Aujourd'hui, London, 1931, contains several photos of Sacha & members of La Horde and details his role in La Horde.
- Gliksman-Weissberg, Annette, phD thesis 1994-95. Université de Paris VII translates Chil Aronson in 1910 (from Yiddish) into French. Aronson later wrote that Sacha was one of the few foreign artists from L'ecole de Paris who volunteered for the French Army.
- Paulvé, Dominique. La Ruche, editions Grund, Paris, 2002. includes a photo on page 93 of La Coupole & a group of artists at coffee. Sacha is the first one on the left foreground.
- Venale Pecus, with photo of the artist & a shot of his studio
