= Journal amusant =

French satirical magazine (1956-1933)

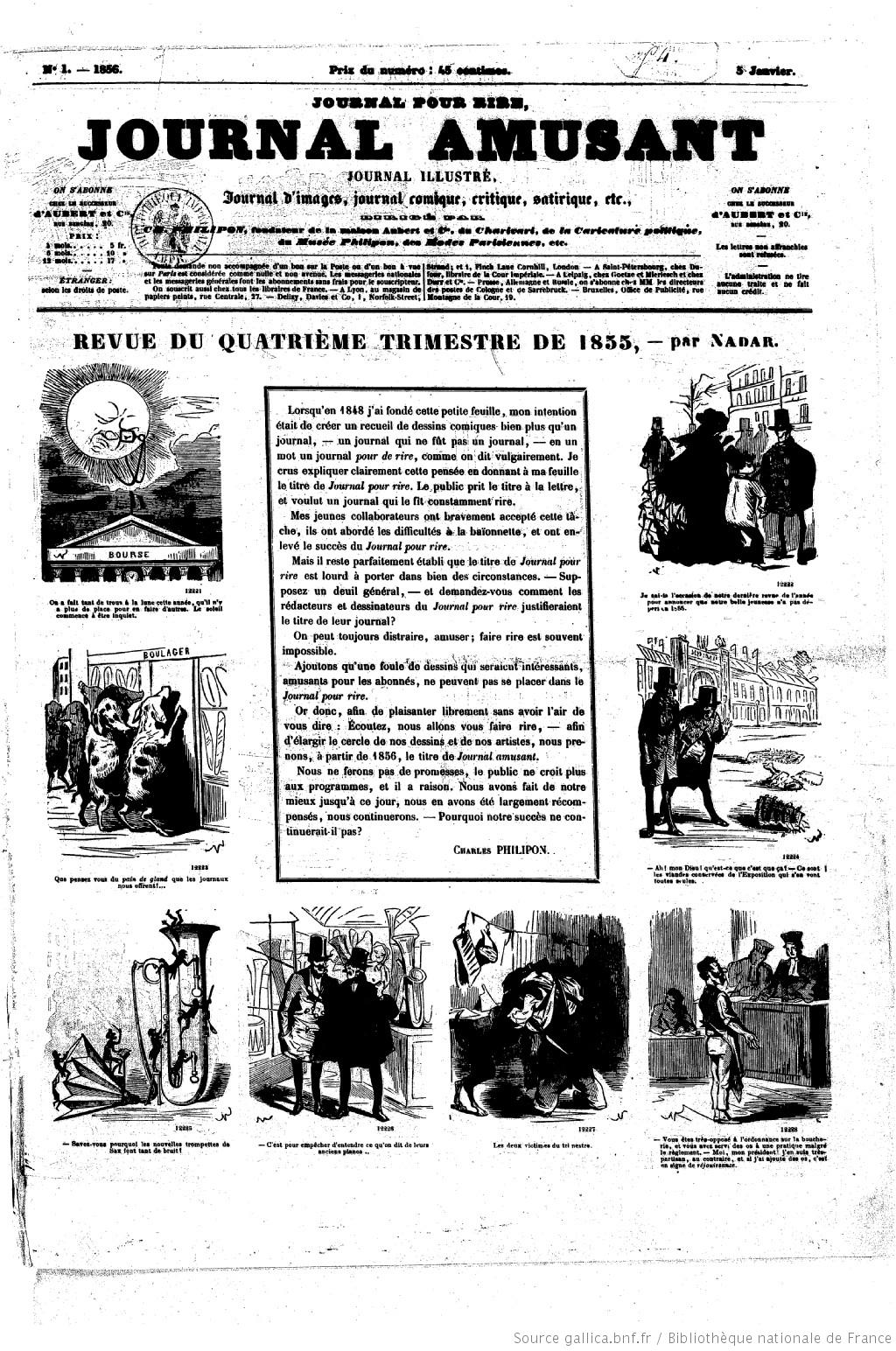
Front page of the first edition, 5 January 1856

Journal amusant was a French weekly satirical magazine published from 1856 until 1933. It was founded by the caricaturist, journalist, and publisher Charles Philipon.

The magazine's immediate predecessor was Journal pour rire which Philipon had founded in 1849. In 1856, he replaced it with Journal amusant and simultaneously started Petit Journal pour rire for his friend Nadar to edit, although Nadar was to contribute to both publications. The original format of Journal amusant was 8 pages and consisted primarily of cartoons and caricatures satirizing the social mores of the day. Lighter in tone than Le Charivari (also founded by Philipon), its editorial content was largely focused on the theatre and fashion rather than politics.

Following Charles Philipon's death in 1862, the journal was managed by his son Eugène until his own death in 1874. Pierre Véron then took over as editor-in-chief. In 1899, shortly before Véron's retirement, its format changed to 16 pages with a front page in colour. Publication of the journal ceased during World War I and resumed in May 1919. The last issue of Journal amusant was published in 1933 by which time its title was Le journal amusant et Gai Paris réunis reflecting its takeover of the magazine Gai Paris in 1931.

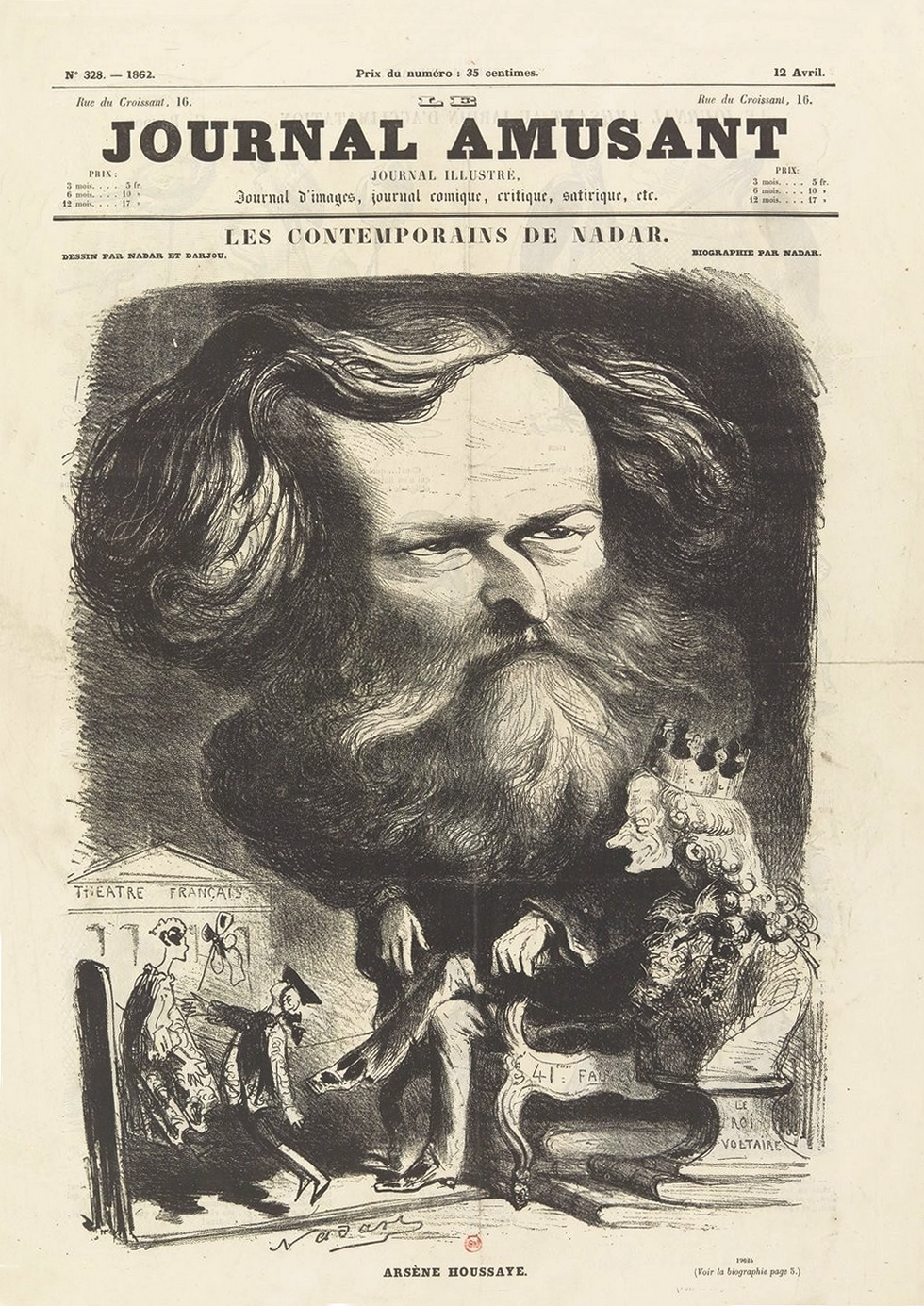
Arsène Houssaye caricature by Nadar et Darjou for Le Journal amusant n°328, 12 April 1862.

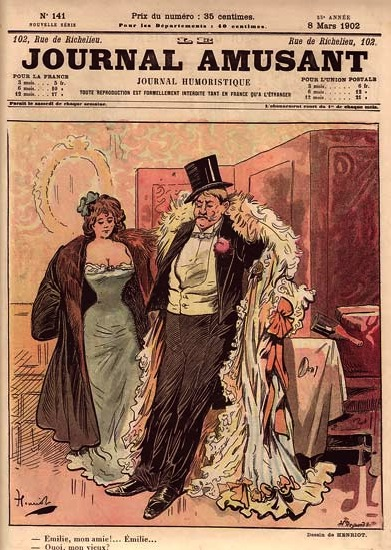
8 March 1902
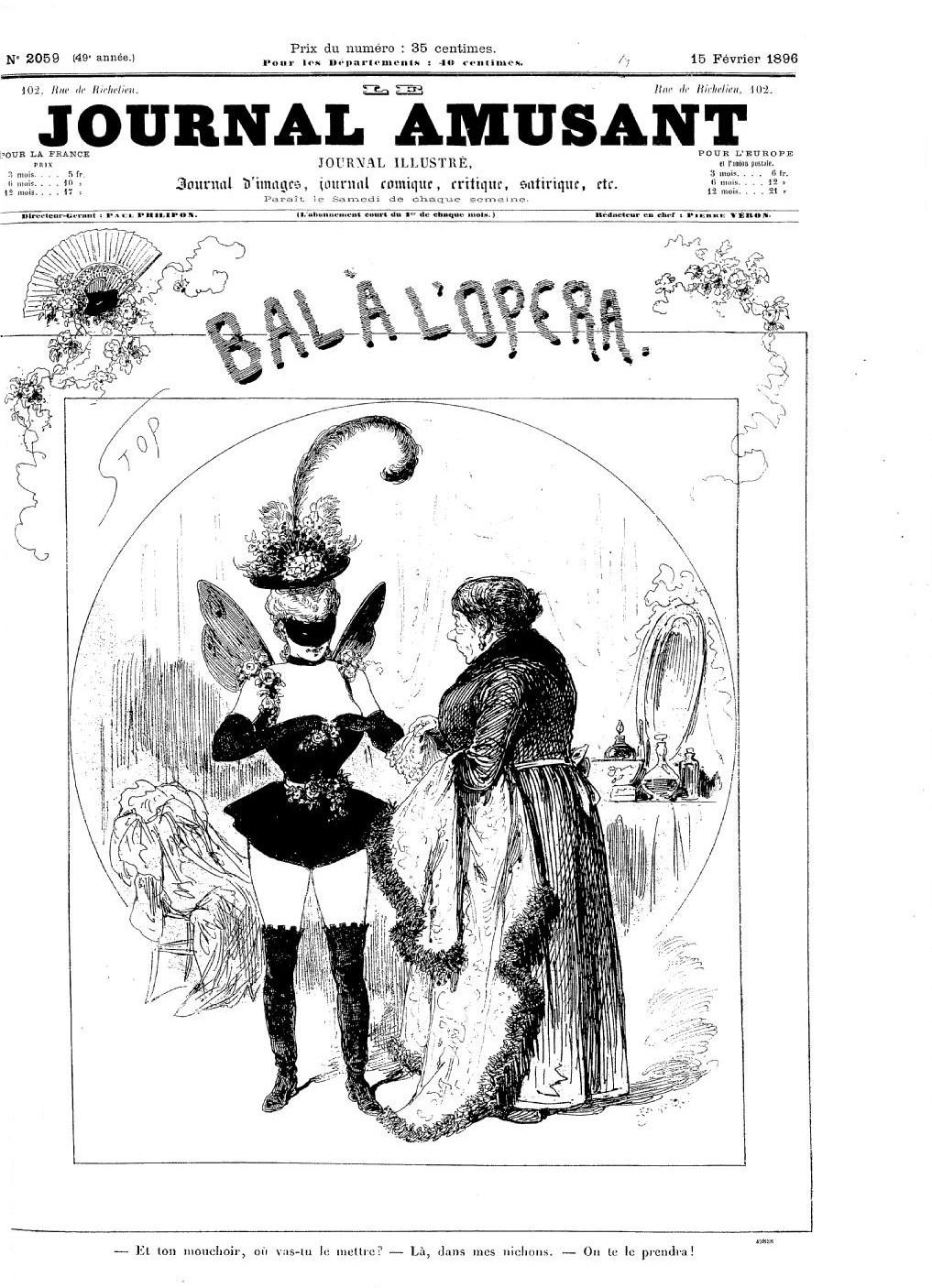
Illustration by Stop, 15 February 1896

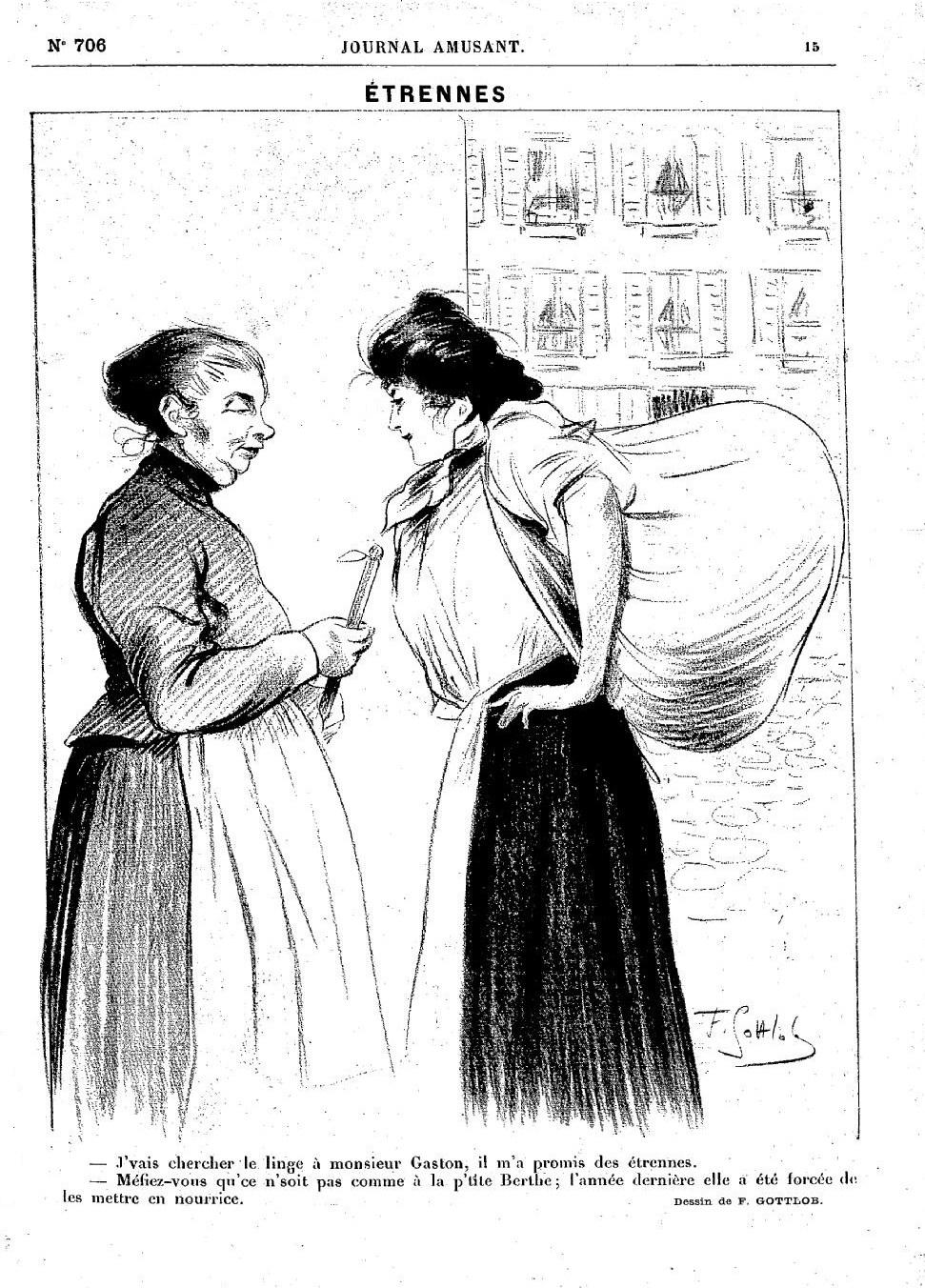
Gottlob 4 January 1913

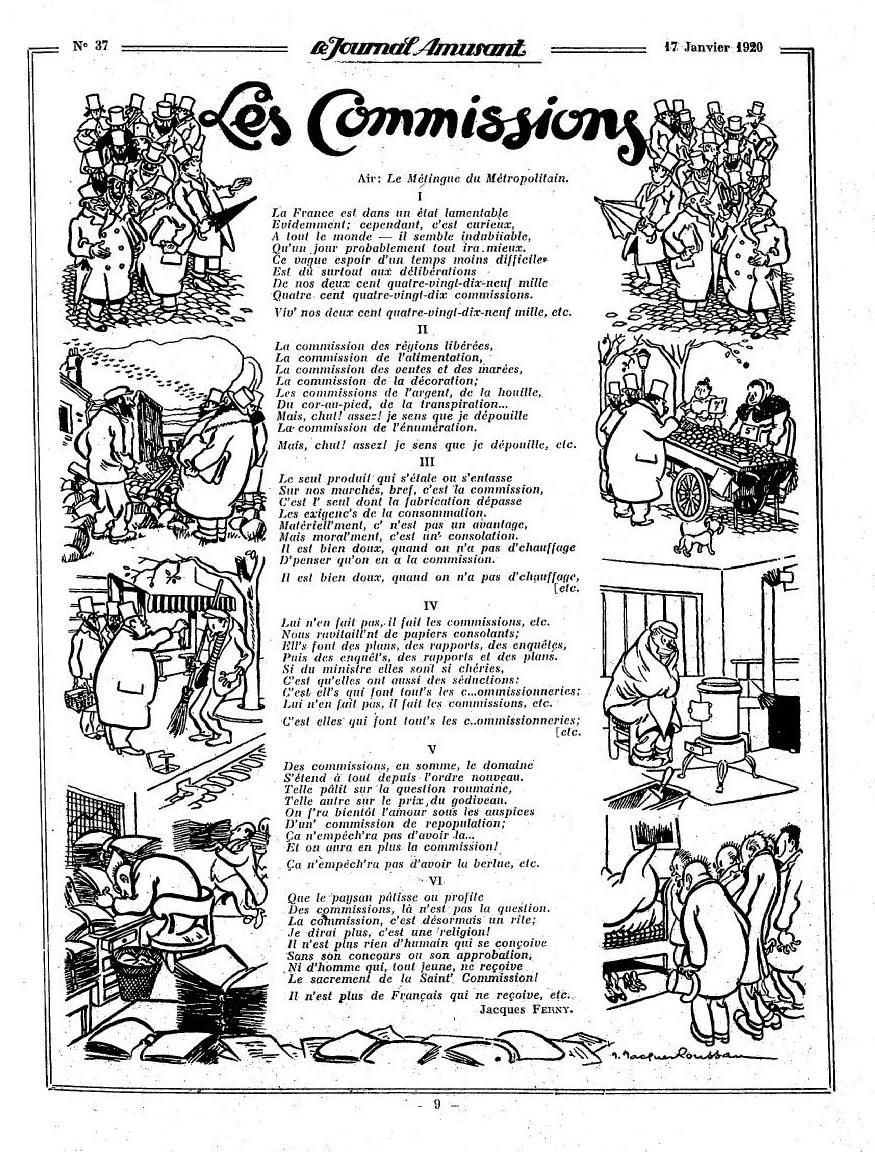
Les Commissions, Written by Jacques Ferny and illustrated by Jacques Roussau Texte, 17 January 1920

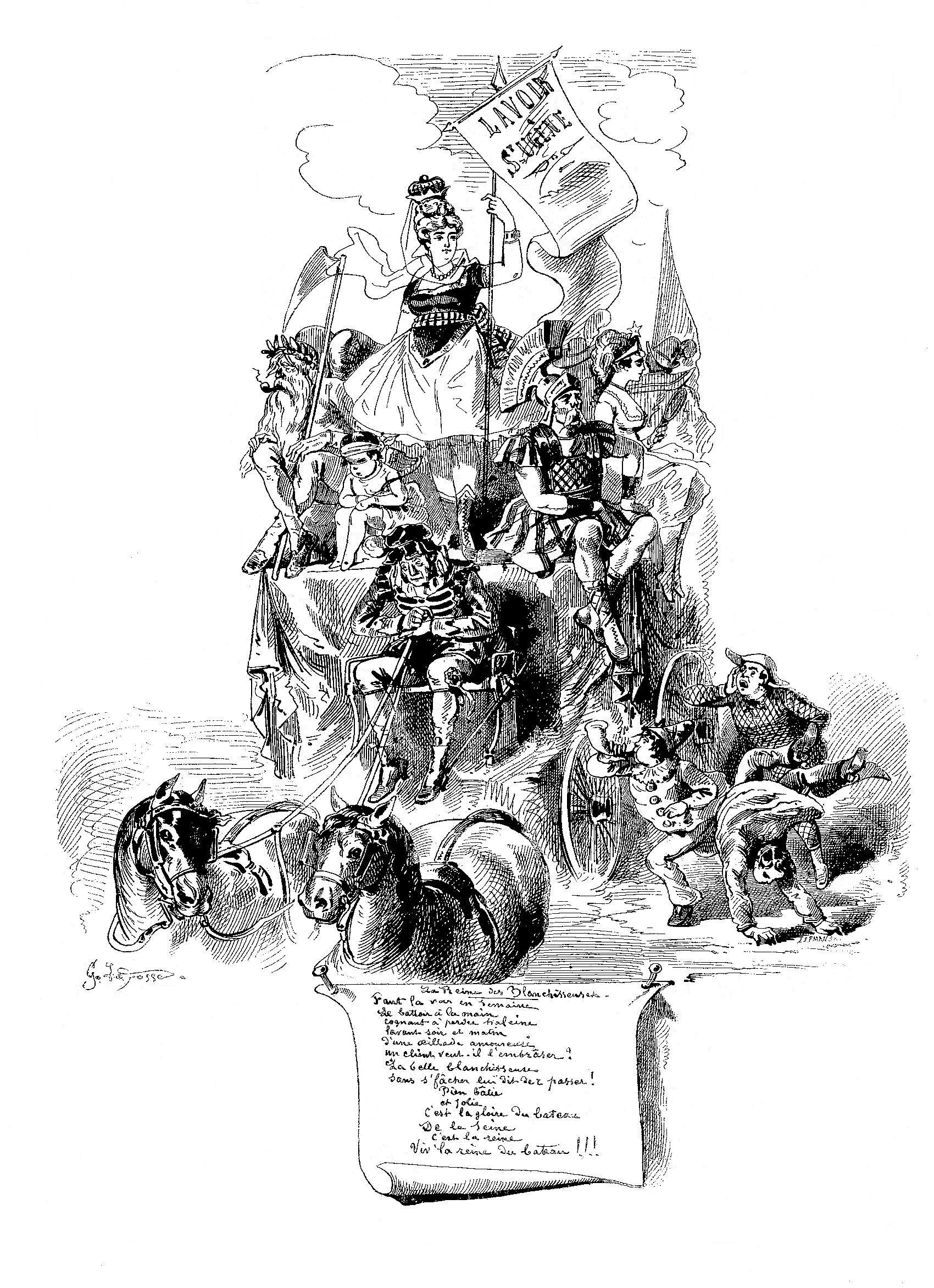
La Reine des blanchisseuses,14 March 1874

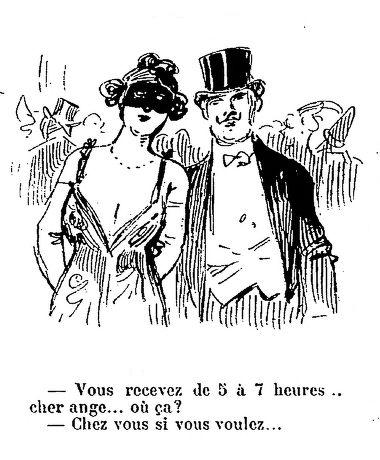
Henriot - Le Journal amusant - 8 février 1913

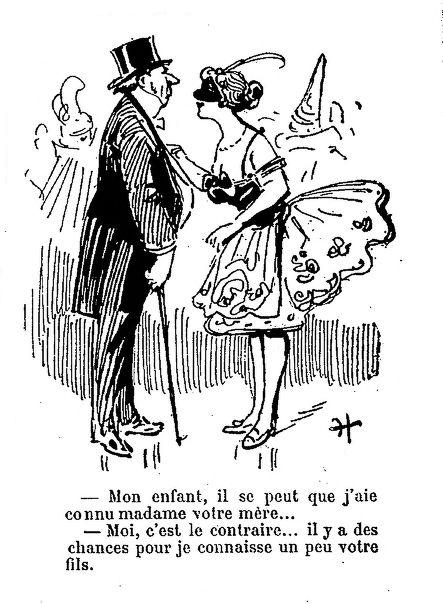
Henriot - Le Journal amusant - 25 janvier 1913

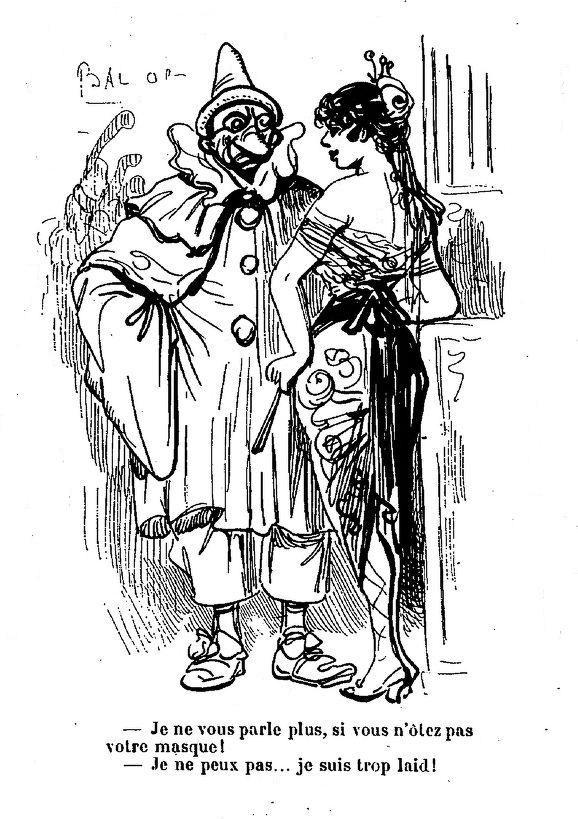
Henriot - Le Journal amusant - Echos - 21 mars 1914

== Contributors ==
Artists who contributed to Journal amusant include:

- Draner
- André Gill
- Alfred Grévin
- Paul Hadol
- Pierre-Georges Jeanniot
- Lucien Métivet (as "Luc")
- Nadar
- Gaston Noury
- Henri Pille
- Albert Robida
- Sacha Zaliouk
