= Henriot (caricaturist) =

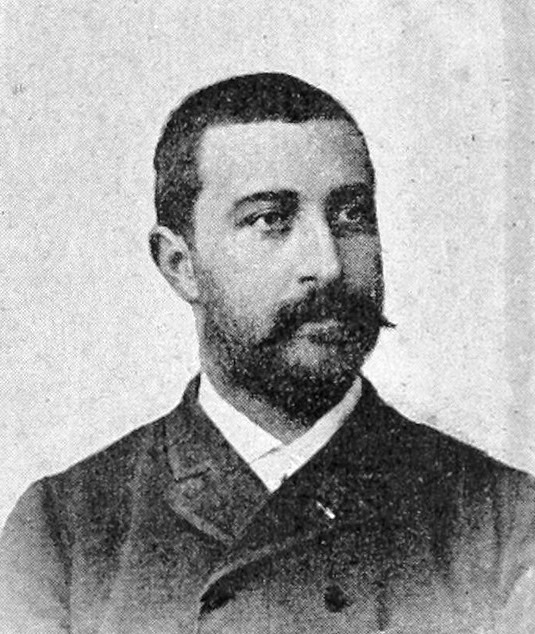
Henry Maigrot

Henri Maigrot (English: /meɪˈɡroʊ/ may-GROH, French: [ɑ̃ʁi mɛɡʁo]; 1857 Toulouse – 1933 Nesles-la-Vallée) was a French writer, artist and caricaturist. He was known under the pen name of Henriot or Pit. He was the father of the poet Émile Henriot.

== Works ==
- Napoléon aux enfers (Napoleon in hell)
- L'Article de Paris (l'Article de Paris), Paris, c 1887
- Les Régiments de France, histoire des Zouaves, Paris, c 1900
- L'Année parisienne, éditions Conquet, 1894
- Aventures prodigieuses de Cyrano de Bergerac, Pellerin, Épinal, 1900
- Histoire d'un vieux chêne
- Paris en l’an 3000, Henri Laurens, Paris, 1910

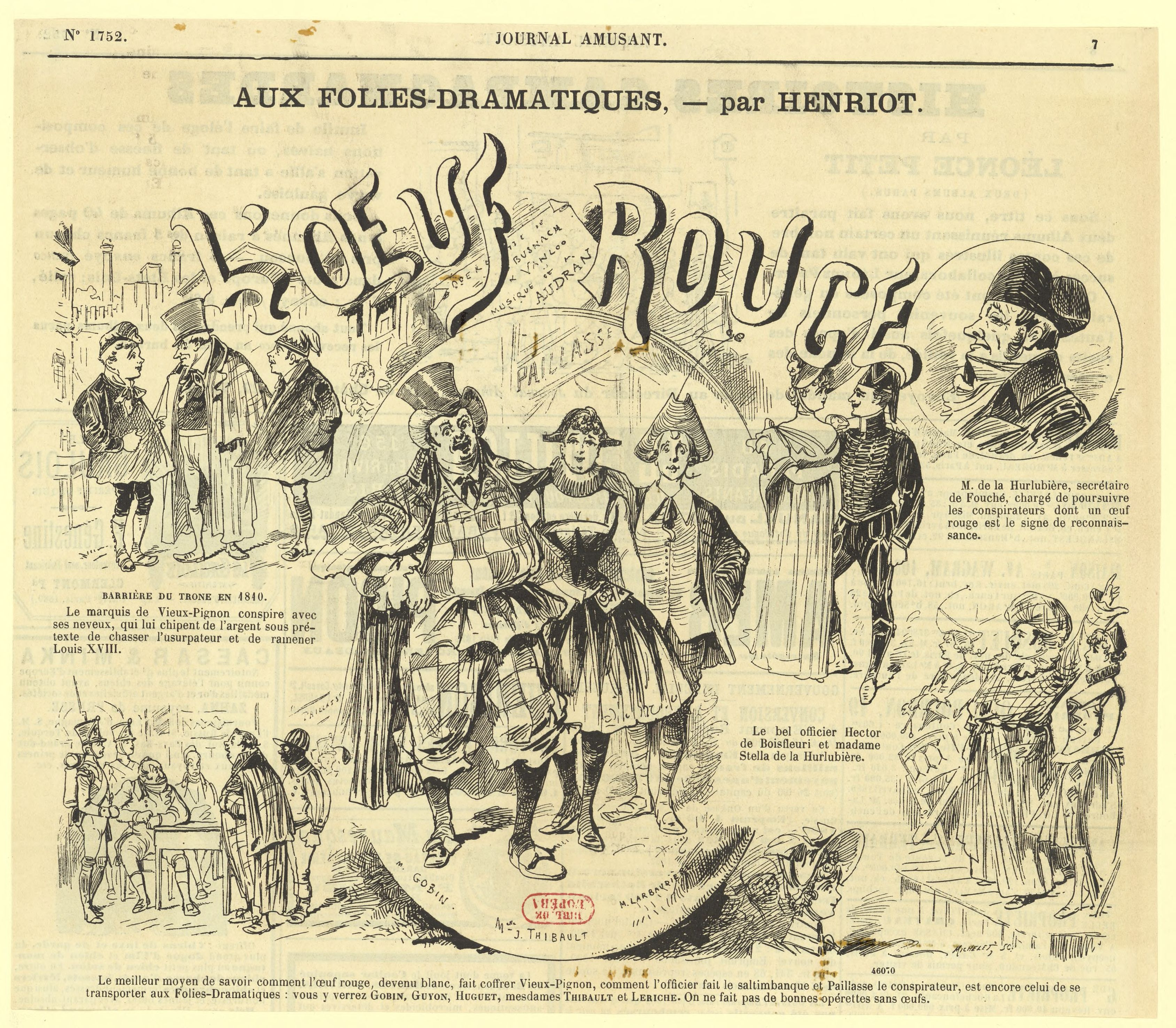
Press illustration from the French periodical Journal amusant for the operetta L'Oeuf rouge [The Red Egg], with music by Edmond Audran and words by William Busnach and Vanloo, performed by the Folies-Dramatiques, beginning 14 March 1890

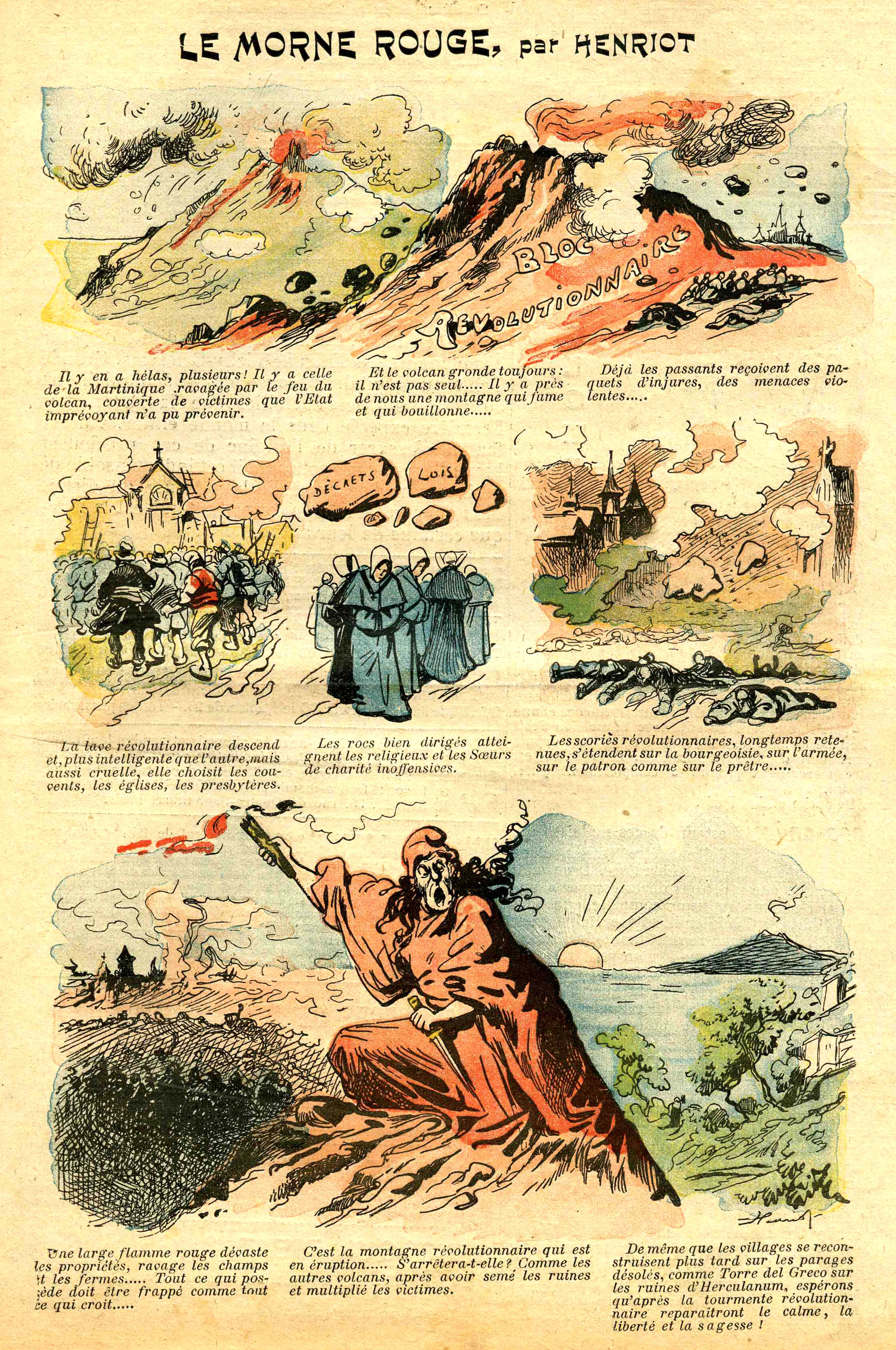
Le morne rouge

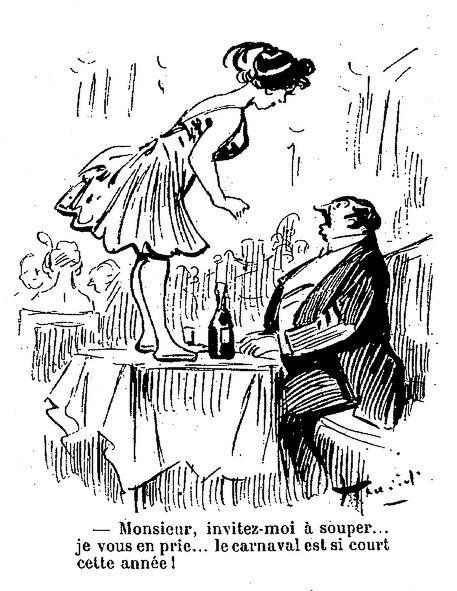
Le Journal amusant, 1913

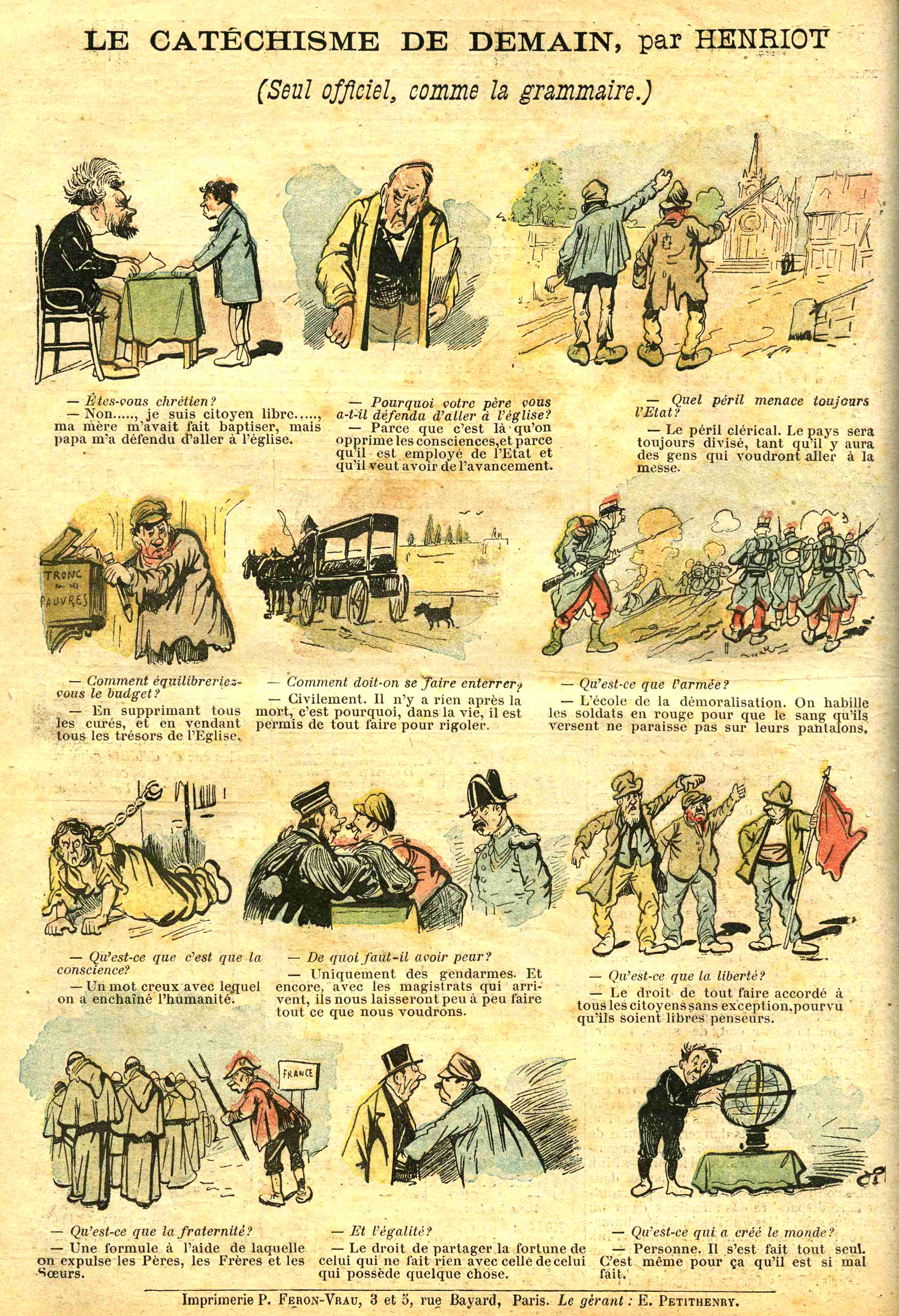
Le catéchisme de demain, 1902
