= Hanriot (surname) =

Hanriot (English: /ɒ̃ˈriːoʊ/, French: [ɑ̃ʁjo]) is a surname. Notable people with the name include:

- Cédric Hanriot (fl. 1998–present), French jazz pianist, composer, arranger and record producer
- François Hanriot (1761–1794), leader and street orator of the French Revolution
- Jules-Armand Hanriot (1853–1930), French painter and engraver
- Marcel Hanriot (1894–1961), pilot, show flyer and director of Hanriot
- René Hanriot (1867–1925), founder of the Hanriot aircraft company
