= Pierre Legendre (historian) =

French legal historian and psychoanalyst (1930–2023)

- Born: 15 June 1930; Villedieu-les-Poêles, Manche, France
- Died: 3 March 2023 (aged 92); 15th arrondissement of Paris, France
- Education: University of Paris
- Occupations: Historian; Psychoanalyst

Pierre Legendre (15 June 1930 – 3 March 2023) was a French historian of law and psychoanalyst. Legendre held a position of research director at the École Pratique des Hautes Études. His work is primarily devoted to the history of juristic institutions and concepts (Roman law and Canon law) and to the anthropology of Western civilization.

Legendre was born in Villedieu-les-Poêles, Normandy on 15 June 1930. He collaborated in the making of a number of films, shown on Arte and other television stations: The Fashioning of Western Man (1996), Mirror of a Nation: Ecole Nationale d'Administration and Dominium Mundi: The Empire of Management (2007), all produced and distributed by Ideale Audience International, Paris.

Legendre died on 3 March 2023, at the age of 92.

== Bibliography ==
- Goodrich, Peter, Lior Barshack and Anton Schutz (Eds.), 2006, Law, Text, Terror, Oxon, Routledge-Cavendish. ISBN 978-1-904385-25-7
- Goodrich, Peter and Ronnie Warrington (translated by Alain Pottage), 1990, "The lost temporality of law: An interview with Pierre Legendre", Law and Critique, 1(1-2), pp. 3–20.
- Law and the Unconscious by Pierre Legendre, ed. Peter Goodrich, Palgrave Macmillan 1997. ISBN 0-312-21023-X
