= Zincography =

Printing process using zinc plates

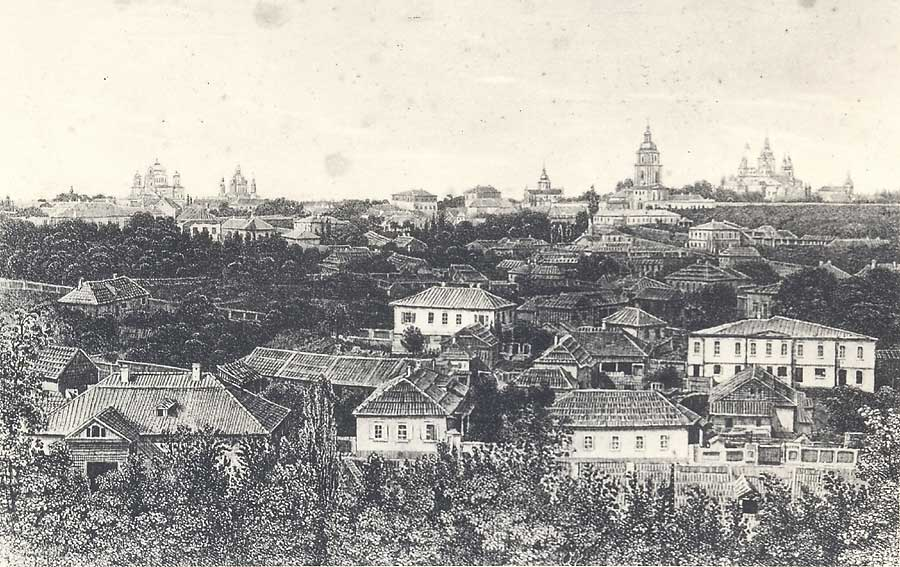
A panoramic image of Kyiv, Ukraine (circa 1870–1880) using the zincographic process.

Zincography was a planographic printing process that used zinc plates. Alois Senefelder first mentioned zinc's lithographic use as a substitute for Bavarian limestone in his 1801 English patent specifications. In 1834, Federico Lacelli patented a zincographic printing process, producing large maps called géoramas. In 1837–1842, Eugène-Florent Kaeppelin (1805–1865) perfected the process to create a large polychrome geologic map.

== Process ==
Zinc plates could be obtained for less expense than fine lithographic limestone, and could be acquired at very large scale. Zinc was coated with a solution containing gallic acid and phosphoric acid that caused hygroscopic salts to form on the plate's surface. A printer would then cover the zinc plate with a coating of asphalt varnish, expose it under a drawing and develop it. The zinc affected by the lines of the drawing proof would be coated with hygroscopic salts. Bathing the plate in acetic acid resulted in the dissolution of the salts, the asphalt varnish protecting the remaining surfaces of the plate. Then the printer would coat the plate with a colored lacquer varnish called fuchsine, dried, dipped in benzene. This would dissolve the varnishes, leaving only the fuchsine varnish in the areas associated with the drawn lines, and hygroscopic salts elsewhere. The printer then wet the plate, the water localizing on the salts. As in lithography, ink applied to the plate was repelled by the hygroscopic areas, and attracted to the fuchsine areas. Sometimes zincographic printers created printing proofs on specially coated papers.

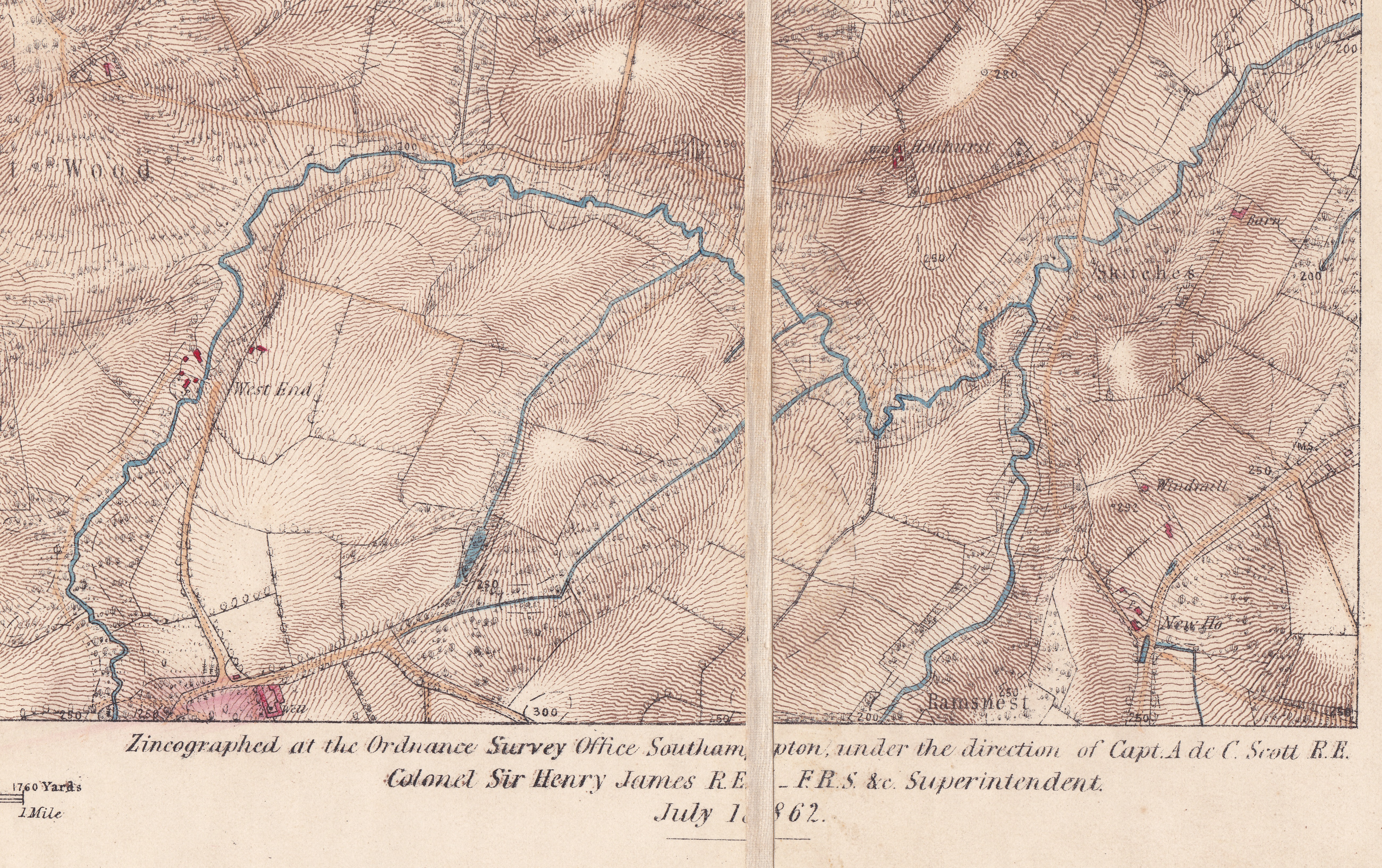
For this map each constituent plate was printed approximately 6 3/4 by 4 3/4 inches on 6 inches to the mile scale.

Variants of the zincographic process included a form of early photographic engraving, photogravure: zinc was coated with a light-sensitive albumen/chromium salt mixture, exposed in contact with a glass negative, inked and the albumen removed by washing to create a single proof image. The printer would then transfer the proof design to a zinc plate under a press, and hand-etch the drawing onto the plate with a stylus. The plate was then rubbed with oil, which would not stick to the repellent coating, but adhere in the etched areas. The printer could then ink the plate, and it would remain in the grooves. As in chromolithography, colors were printed in successive passes of the press, the plates kept in register.

Zincography is frequently confused with modern zinc-plate lithographic printing. It directly influenced the development of photozincography, an early form of photogravure.
