= Émile Henriot (writer) =

French poet and novelist (1889–1961)

- Born: 3 March 1889; Paris, France
- Died: 14 April 1961 (aged 72); Paris, France

Émile Henriot (French: [emil ɑ̃ʁjo]; 3 March 1889 – 14 April 1961) was a French poet, novelist, essayist and literary critic.

== Biography ==
A son of the caricaturist Henri Maigrot, known under the pen name Henriot, he fought in the First World War. He first wrote as a journalist for Temps in the inter-war period. He became literary critic for Monde, the heir of Temps on the Liberation of France, and for them coined the term 'nouveau roman' in 1957. He was elected a member of the Académie française in 1946 at the same time as Édouard Le Roy.

== Works ==
- Poèmes à Sylvie (1906)
- Eurynice (1907)
- Petite suite italienne (1909)
- Jardins à la Française (1911)
- L’Instant et le Souvenir (1912)
- Vignettes romantiques et turqueries (1912)
- À quoi rêvent les jeunes gens ? (1913)
- La Flamme et les Cendres (1914)
- Bellica (1915)
- Le carnet d’un dragon dans les tranchées (1918)
- Valentin (1918)
- Le diable à l’hôtel ou les plaisirs imaginaires (1919)
- Temps innocents (1921)
- Courrier littéraire I (1922)
- Aquarelles (1922)
- Aventures de Sylvain Dutourd (1923)
- Livres et portraits, 3 vol. (1923–1927)
- Aricie Brun ou les Vertus bourgeoises (1924), Grand Prix du roman de l'Académie française
- Stendhaliana (1924)
- Courrier littéraire II (1925)
- Les livres du second rayon (1925)
- Promenades pittoresques sur les bords de la Seine (1926)
- L’enfant perdu (1926)
- Éloge de la curiosité (1927)
- Journal de bord (1927)
- Esquisses et notes de lecture (1928)
- Alfred de Musset (1928)
- Promenades italiennes (1928)
- L’art de former une bibliothèque (1928)
- Romanesques et romantiques (1930)
- Les occasions perdues (1931)
- Épistoliers et mémorialistes (1931)
- La marchande de couronnes (1932)
- En Provence (1932)
- Courrier littéraire : XVIIe siècle (1933)
- Le pénitent de Psalmodi (1933)
- Vers l’oasis en Algérie (1935)
- Portraits de femmes, d’Héloïse à Marie Bashkirtseff (1935)
- Tout va finir (1936)
- Portraits de femmes, de Marie de France à Katherine Mansfield (1937)
- Le livre de mon père (1938)
- Recherche d’un château perdu (1941)
- Le pèlerinage espagnol (1942)
- Quatre nouvelles (1944)
- Poètes français, 2 vol. (1944–1946)
- Naissances (1945)
- Courrier littéraire : XIIIe siècle, 2 vol. (1945)
- Beautés du Brésil (1946)
- Courrier littéraire : XIXe siècle, autour de Chateaubriand (1948)
- La rose de Bratislava (1948)
- Courrier littéraire : XIXe siècle, Stendhal, Mérimée et leurs amis (1948)
- Les fils de la louve (1949)
- Tout va recommencer sans nous (1951)
- Courrier littéraire III (1953)
- Courrier littéraire : XIXe-XXe siècles, 2 vol. (1955–1956)
- Au bord du temps (1958)
- On n’est pas perdu sur la terre (1960)
