= List of grand couturiers =

A grand couturier is a member of the Fédération de la Haute Couture et de la Mode. The organization, originally called the Chambre Syndicale de la Couture, was created in 1868 as an association of fashion designers. In 1945, the controlled appellation "Haute Couture" was created and the organization became the Chambre Syndicale de la Haute Couture. In 2017, the chambre became the Fédération de la Haute Couture et de la Mode. The term haute couture can only be applied to, and used by, grand couturiers.

== Criteria ==
The official 1945 criteria stipulated that a fashion house must present a certain number of original designs each season, created by a permanent designer, that designs must be handmade and bespoke, that a minimum number of people be employed in the workshop, and that a minimum number of patterns must be presented, "usually in Paris". In 2001, the criteria were relaxed. The number of models to be shown on a seasonal basis has been reduced from 50 to 35. Also, the official appellation can be granted by the Chambre syndicale de la haute couture even if one criterion is not met.

Chambre syndicale has three types of members: Haute Couture Members, Corresponding Members and Guest Members. There are also fashion houses listed in its member list, which are not categorized as either of the three.

Each season, the Fédération officially invites guests designers. They can use the term "couture" and can become grands couturiers after 2 years. The Chambre syndicale also recognizes foreign grands couturiers who do not show in Paris, referring to them as "membres correspondants".

== Haute Couture Members of the Fédération de la Haute Couture et de la Mode ==
Below are the Haute Couture members according to the Fédération's Fall/Winter 2026–2027 membership list:

- Adeline André
- Alexis Mabille
- Chanel
- Christian Dior
- Franck Sorbier
- Giambattista Valli
- Jean Paul Gaultier
- Julien Fournié
- Maison Margiela
- Schiaparelli
- Stéphane Rolland

=== Corresponding members ===
- Elie Saab
- Fendi
- Giorgio Armani Privé
- Iris Van Herpen
- Valentino
- Versace
- Viktor & Rolf

=== Guest members ===
- Aelis
- ArdAzAei
- Ashi Studio
- Balenciaga
- Celia Kritharioti
- Georges Hobeika
- Germanier
- Imane Ayissi
- Julie de Libran
- Manish Malhotra
- Peet Dullaert
- Rahul Mishra
- Rami Al Ali
- Robert Wun
- RVDK Ronald van der Kemp
- Standing Ground
- Yuima Nakazato
- Zuhair Murad

=== Recent Guest Members ===
Recent guest members have included the fashion houses of:

- Cathy Pill
- Gaurav Gupta
- Gerald Watelet
- Juana Martín
- Ma Ke (Wuyong).
- Nicolas Le Cauchois
- Miss Sohee
- Phan Huy

=== Former Members ===
In addition to current permanent, corresponding and guest members, previously other major houses and designers have appeared as members of the Chambre Syndicale de la Haute Couture. Including:

- Anne Valérie Hash
- Cristóbal Balenciaga
- Callot Soeurs
- Charles Montaigne
- Marie-Louise Carven
- Christian Lacroix
- Emanuel Ungaro
- Emilio Pucci
- Escada
- Frank Sorbier
- Germaine Lecomte
- Grès
- Givenchy
- Guy Laroche
- Hanae Mori
- Jacques Fath
- Jacques Griffe
- Jacques Heim
- Jean Patou
- Jean-Louis Scherrer
- Joseph
- Lanvin
- Lecoanet Hemant
- Loris Azzaro
- Louis Féraud
- Lucien Lelong
- Louise Chéruit
- Mad Carpentier
- Madeleine Vionnet
- Madeleine Vramant
- Maggy Rouff
- Mainbocher
- Marcel Rochas
- Marcelle Chaumont
- Nina Ricci
- Patrick Kelly
- Paco Rabanne
- Paul Poiret
- Philippe et Gaston
- Pierre Balmain
- Pierre Cardin
- Robert Piguet
- Ted Lapidus
- Thierry Mugler
- Torrente
- Vera Borea
- Yiqing Yin
- Yves Saint Laurent

== See also ==
- Haute couture
- Fédération de la Haute Couture et de la Mode
- List of fashion designers
