= Haute couture =

Creation of exclusive, custom-fitted clothing

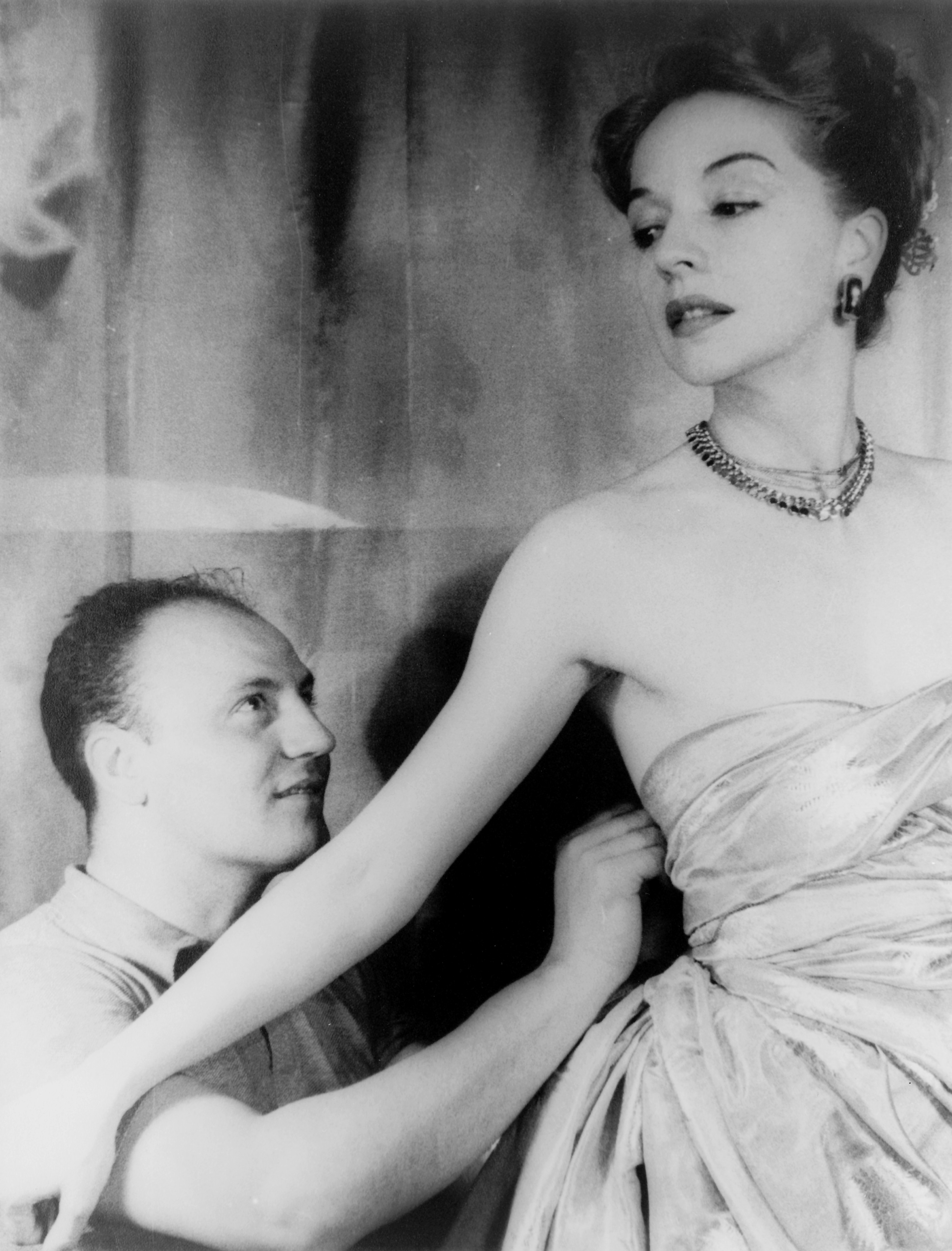
Pierre Balmain adjusting a dress on model Ruth Ford in 1947 (photographed by Carl Van Vechten)

Haute couture (Note: Pronounced /ˌoʊt kuːˈtjʊər/ OHT koo-TYOOR, also US: /kʊ-/ kuu-; French: [ot kutyʁ]) is the creation of exclusive custom-fitted high-end fashion design. The term haute couture generally refers to a specific type of upper garment common in Europe during the 16th to the 18th century or to the upper portion of a modern dress to distinguish it from the skirt and sleeves. Beginning in the mid-nineteenth century, Paris became the centre of a growing industry that focused on making outfits from high-quality, expensive, and often unusual fabric, sewn with extreme attention to detail and finished by the most experienced and capable of sewers, often using time-consuming, hand-executed techniques. Couture is also commonly used on its own as an abbreviation of haute couture, referring to the same concept in spirit.

== Terminology ==
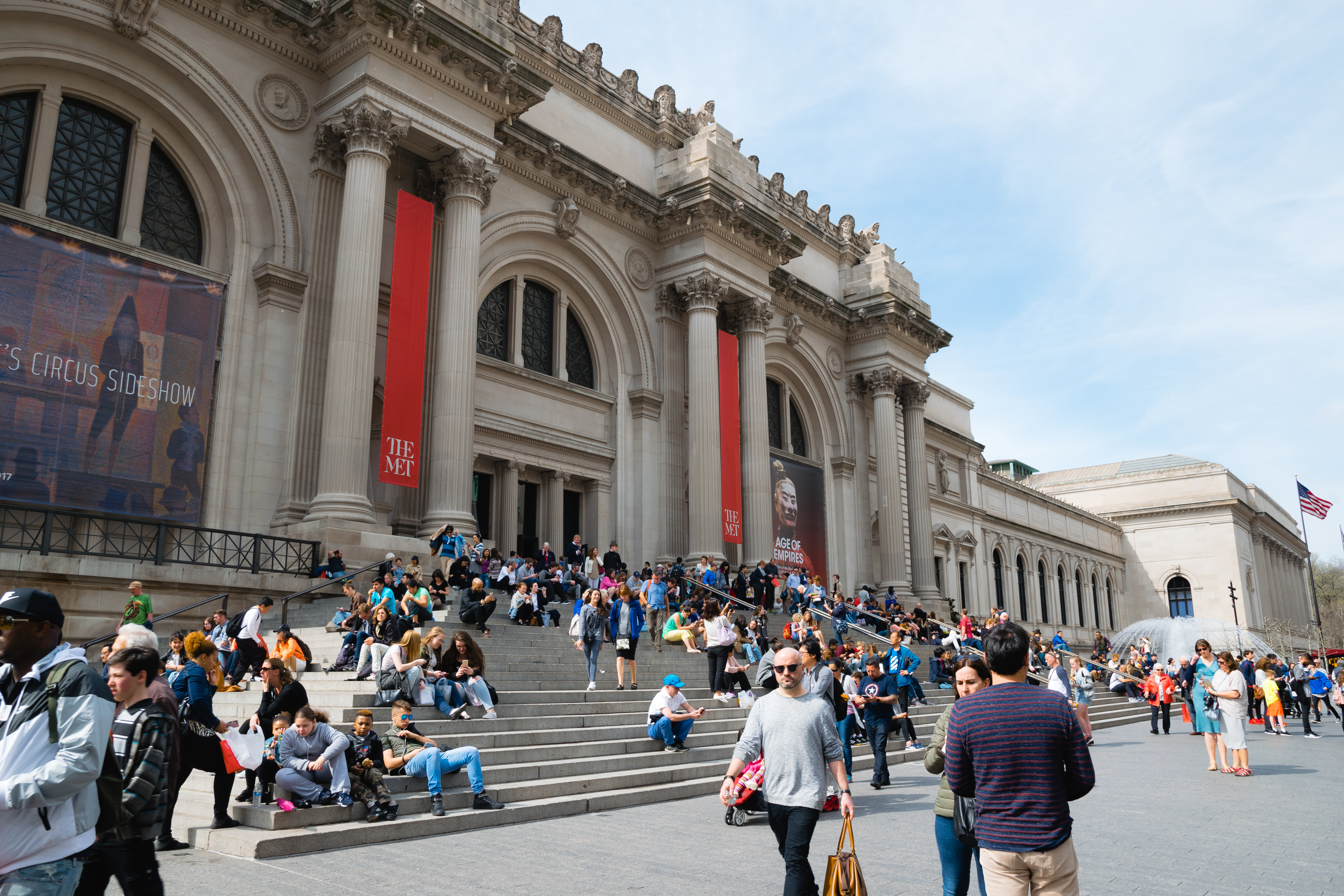
The annual Met Gala, held at the Metropolitan Museum of Art on the Upper East Side of Manhattan and organized by Vogue high-fashion magazine, hosts the largest haute couture fashion night annually.

=== Etymology ===
The English term haute couture was borrowed from French, where it literally means 'high sewing' or 'high dressmaking'. Its first recorded use in English was in 1908, in the Arnold Bennett novel The Old Wives' Tale.

=== History ===
The term haute couture is protected by French law and defined by the Paris Chamber of Commerce. The Fédération de la Haute Couture et de la Mode is defined as "the regulating commission that determines which fashion houses are eligible to be true haute couture houses". Their rules state that only "those companies mentioned on the list drawn up each year by a commission domiciled at the Ministry for Industry are entitled to avail themselves" of the label haute couture. The Chambre Syndicale de la Couture Parisienne is an association of Parisian couturiers founded in 1868 as an outgrowth of medieval guilds that regulate its members with regard to counterfeiting of styles, dates of openings for collections, number of models presented, relations with press, questions of law and taxes, and promotional activities. Formation of the organisation was brought about by Charles Frederick Worth. An affiliated school was organized in 1930 called L'Ecole de la Chambre Syndicale de la Couture. The school helps bring new designers to help the "couture" houses that are still present today. Since 1975, it has operated within the Fédération de la Haute Couture et de la Mode.

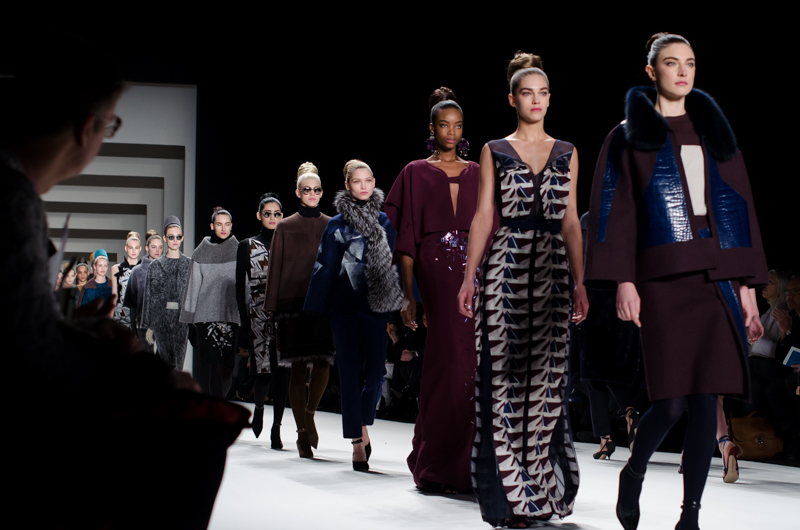
Haute couture fashion models walk the runway during New York Fashion Week.

In response to the Nazi occupation of Paris, more rigorous criteria for the term haute couture were established in 1945. To earn the right to call itself a couture house and to use the term haute couture in its advertising and any other way, members of the Chambre Syndicale de la Haute Couture must follow specific rules:

- design made-to-order for private clients, with one or more fittings;
- have a workshop (atelier) in Paris that employs at least fifteen staff members full-time;
- have at least 20 full-time technical people, in at least one workshop (atelier); and
- present a collection of at least 50 original designs to the public every fashion season (twice, in January and July of each year), of both day and evening garments.

=== Current use ===
The term is also used loosely to describe all high-fashion, custom-fitted clothing, whether it is produced in the fashion capitals of London, New York City, Paris, and Milan. In either case, the term can refer to the fashion houses or fashion designers that create exclusive and often trend-setting fashions or to the fashions created. The term haute couture has also taken on further popular meanings referring to non-dressmaking activities, such as production of fine art and music.

== History in France ==
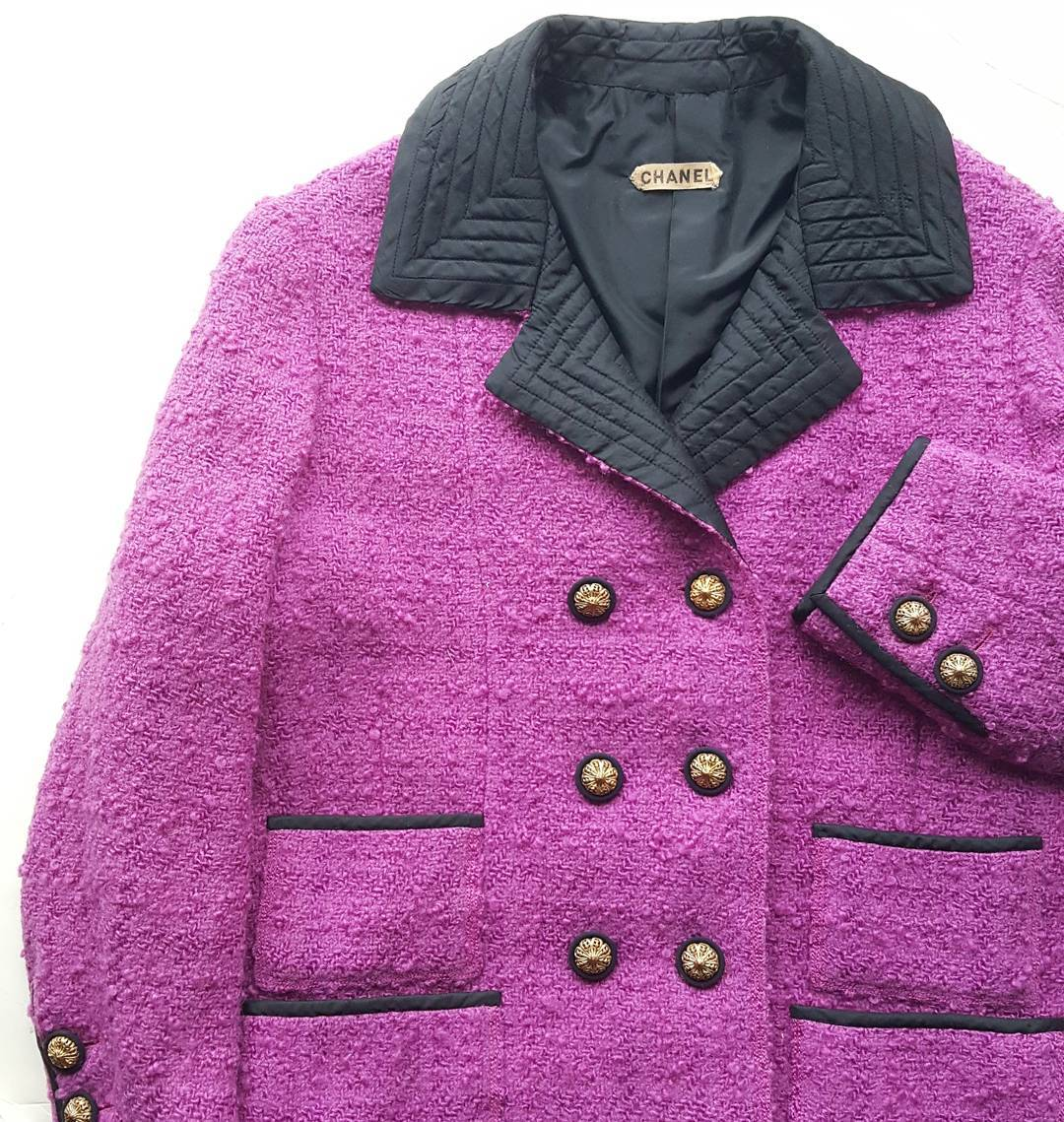
Chanel Haute Couture jacket, Autumn/Winter 1961

Haute couture can be referenced back as early as the 17th century. Industry and consumption were legally protected through guild statutes that required strict adherence to quality, quantity, etc. Women dressmakers, known as couturières, attained guild privileges in 1675. Their guild statutes made it so these women acquired the rights to make clothing for women and children, while male tailors retained the right to make clothing for men and boys over the age of 8. Within this empire, the couturières' work ranged from simple mending to modes (fashions). They performed darning and alterations, in addition to making fine dresses of luxurious fabric for members of the royal family and aristocracy. Seamstresses were only one part of this process, which also included domestic manufacture, imported products, and work, as well as guilds such as the lacemakers, ribbonmakers, fashion merchants, embroiderers, pin and needle peddlers, etc. Seamstresses did not operate public shops, unlike tailors, but instead relied on word of mouth and connections to procure high-end clientele.

18th century France witnessed a dramatic rise in clothing consumption, and scholars have documented a "clothing revolution" that occurred between 1700 and 1789. This was characterised by the increased size and value of wardrobes across the country, even among the middling and working classes. The fashion industry sprang to life to meet increasing demand.

Rose Bertin, the French fashion designer to Queen Marie Antoinette, can be credited for bringing fashion and haute couture to French culture. Visitors to Paris brought back clothing that was then copied by local dressmakers. Stylish women also ordered dresses in the latest Parisian fashion to serve as models.

As railroads and steamships made European travel easier, it was increasingly common for wealthy women to travel to Paris to shop for clothing and accessories. French fitters and dressmakers were commonly thought to be the best in Europe, and real Parisian garments were considered better than local imitations.

A couturier (French: [ku.ty.ʁje]) is an establishment or person involved in the clothing fashion industry who makes original garments to order for private clients. A couturier may make what is known as haute couture. Such a person usually hires patternmakers and machinists for garment production, and is either employed by exclusive boutiques or is self-employed.

The couturier Charles Frederick Worth is widely considered the father of haute couture as it is known today. Although born in Bourne, Lincolnshire, England, Worth made his mark in the French fashion industry. Revolutionising how dressmaking had been previously perceived, Worth made it so the dressmaker became the artist of garnishment: a fashion designer. While he created one-of-a-kind designs to please some of his titled or wealthy customers, he is best known for preparing a portfolio of designs that were shown on live models at the House of Worth. Clients selected one model, specified colours and fabrics, and had a duplicate garment tailor-made in Worth's workshop. Worth combined individual tailoring with a standardization more characteristic of the ready-to-wear clothing industry, which was also developing during this period.

Following in Worth's footsteps were Callot Soeurs, Patou, Paul Poiret, Madeleine Vionnet, Mariano Fortuny, Jeanne Lanvin, Chanel, Mainbocher, Schiaparelli, Cristóbal Balenciaga, and Christian Dior. Some of these fashion houses still exist today, under the leadership of modern designers.

In the 1960s, a group of young protégés that had trained under more senior and established fashion designers including Dior and Balenciaga left these established couture houses and opened their own establishments. The most successful of these young designers were Yves Saint Laurent, Pierre Cardin, André Courrèges, Ted Lapidus, and Emanuel Ungaro. Japanese native and Paris-based Hanae Mori was also successful in establishing her own line.

Lacroix is one of the fashion houses to have been started in the late 20th century. Other new houses have included Jean Paul Gaultier and Thierry Mugler. Due to the high expenses of producing haute couture collections, Lacroix and Mugler have since ceased their haute couture activities.

For all these fashion houses, custom clothing is no longer the main source of income, often costing much more than it earns through direct sales; it only adds the aura of fashion to their ventures in ready-to-wear clothing and related luxury products such as shoes and perfumes, and licensing ventures that earn greater returns for the company. It is their ready-to-wear collections that are available to a wider audience, adding a splash of glamour and the feel of haute couture to more wardrobes. Fashion houses still create custom clothing for publicity, such as when providing items to celebrity events such as the Met Gala.

== Members of the Chambre Syndicale de la Haute Couture ==
=== Official members ===
- Adeline André
- Alexandre Vauthier
- Alexis Mabille
- Bouchra Jarrar
- Balmain
- Chanel
- Dior
- Franck Sorbier
- Giambattista Valli
- Givenchy
- Jean Paul Gaultier
- Julien Fournié
- Maison Margiela
- Schiaparelli
- Maurizio Galante
- Stéphane Rolland

=== Correspondent members (foreign) ===
- Armani
- Elie Saab
- Fendi
- Iris van Herpen
- Ulyana Sergeenko
- Valentino
- Versace
- Viktor & Rolf

=== Guest members ===
- Aelis
- Ashi Studio
- Charles de Vilmorin
- Christophe Josse
- Gaurav Gupta
- Georges Hobeika
- Imane Ayissi
- Juana Martín
- Julie de Libran
- Peet Dullaert
- Rabih Kayrouz
- Rahul Mishra
- Robert Wun
- Ronald van der Kemp
- Sara Chraibi
- Thom Browne
- Yuima Nakazato
- Zuhair Murad
- Vishali S

Recent guest members have included the fashion houses of Cathy Pill, Gerald Watelet, Nicolas Le Cauchois and Ma Ke (Wuyong). In the 2008/2009 Fall/Winter Haute Couture week, Emanuel Ungaro showed as an Official Member.

=== Former members ===
- Anne Valérie Hash
- Cristóbal Balenciaga
- Callot Soeurs
- Charles Montaigne
- Marie-Louise Carven
- Christian Lacroix
- Emilio Pucci
- Escada
- Frank Sorbier
- Germaine Lecomte
- Grès
- Guy Laroche
- Hanae Mori
- Jacques Fath
- Jacques Griffe
- Jacques Heim
- Jean Patou
- Jean-Louis Scherrer
- Joseph
- Lanvin
- Lecoanet Hemant
- Loris Azzaro
- Louis Féraud
- Lucien Lelong
- Louise Chéruit
- Mad Carpentier
- Madeleine Vionnet
- Madeleine Vramant
- Maggy Rouff
- Mainbocher
- Marcel Rochas
- Marcelle Chaumont
- Nina Ricci
- Patrick Kelly
- Paco Rabanne
- Paul Poiret
- Philippe et Gaston
- Pierre Balmain
- Pierre Cardin
- Robert Piguet
- Ted Lapidus
- Thierry Mugler
- Torrente
- Vera Borea
- Yiqing Yin
- Yves Saint Laurent

== Fabrics ==
=== Silk ===
Textiles refer to the fabric or medium being used by designers to create an article of clothing. History of silk originated in Neolithic China within the Yangshao culture (4th millennium BC), where the "Silk worm" was discovered. The Asian elite began using silk in high fashion. As time went on, silk began to be traded leading to the creation of the "Silk Road", which was a boost to China's economy. The value of silk is distinguished by the form of its use, such as it being used as currency. Silk fabric is composed of fibers that are produced by the silkworm mainly found in China. There are various kinds of silks, used by designers in the textile world, such as dupioni, China, brocade, Jacquard, and satin silk. These various kinds of silks are often used to produce certain styles of clothing. For example, Chiffon silk is used to create draping because this silk is a thinner silk than others. This allows for easier movement and flow of the fabric, thus creating an easier process for draping.

=== Wool ===
Wool is the textile fiber obtained from animals such as sheep, camels, camelids, goats, or other hairy mammals. Wool was first discovered and used mainly for protection against cold weather. Not all types are acceptable or considered "fine" wool. For instance, fine wool is found only within four breeds of sheep, the other fifteen are not considered to be "fine". Dying wool is a delicate procedure because wool easily absorbs colour, so it is important to be cautious in order not to ruin the wool. Some of the higher-end wools are alpaca, angora wool, mohair, cashmere wool, camel hair, and vicuña wool; each of these wools has a different texture and softness.

== See also ==
- List of individual dresses
- Ready-to-wear
- Mass market
- Deconstruction (fashion)
