= Théâtre de la Mode =

Miniature fashion display

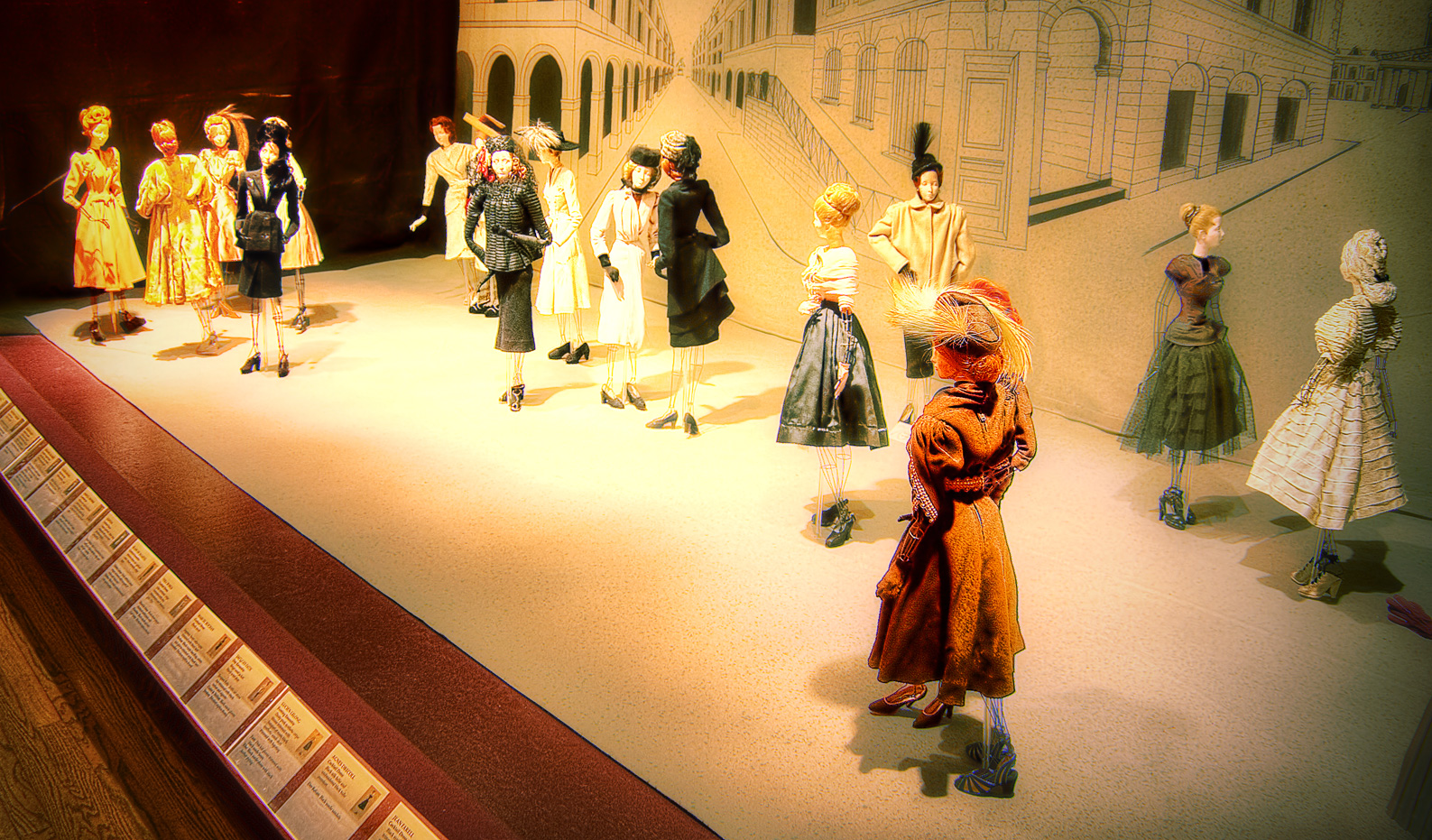
Théâtre de la Mode exhibit of doll-like mannequins wearing 1946 French couture clothing and accessories.

Théâtre de la Mode (Theatre of Fashion) was a 1945–1946 touring exhibit of fashion mannequins created at approximately 1/3 the size of human scale, and crafted by top Paris fashion designers. It was created to raise funds for war survivors and to help revive the French fashion industry in the aftermath of World War II. While raising funds, Théâtre de la Mode was also meant to showcase the work of Parisian couturiers. The original Théâtre de la Mode exhibit toured Europe and then the United States, and is now part of the permanent collections of the Maryhill Museum of Art in Washington state in the United States. In addition to its fundraising and industry revival goals, the Théâtre de la Mode exhibit played a significant role in promoting French fashion internationally. The miniature mannequins and exquisite designs showcased the creativity and craftsmanship of Parisian couturiers, attracting attention and admiration from fashion enthusiasts worldwide. The exhibit's subsequent journey to the United States helped solidify the global influence of French fashion and contributed to the post-war cultural exchange between Europe and America.

== Origins ==
The French fashion industry was an important economic and cultural force in Paris when World War II began. There were 70 registered couture houses in Paris, and many other smaller designers. The war had a severe impact on the industry. Couturiers and buyers fled occupied France or closed their businesses. Clothing businesses that struggled to remain open had to deal with extreme shortages of cloth, thread, and other sewing supplies. The occupying Germans intended to displace Paris with Berlin as a centre of European fashion design. The Nazi regime planned to turn Berlin and Vienna into the centres of European couture, with head offices there and an official administration, introducing subsidies for German clothing makers, and demanding that important people in the French fashion industry be sent to Germany to establish a dressmaking school there. Couture's place in France's economy was key to this plan: an exported dress made by one of France's leading couturiers was said to be worth "ten tonnes of coal", and a litre of fine French perfume was worth "two tonnes of petrol".

French fashion was also not only important economically, it was a vital part of France's national cultural identity. French designers resisted the Nazi regime's plans; Lucien Lelong, president of the Chambre Syndicale de la Couture Parisienne, proclaimed, 'It is in Paris or it is nowhere'. A worker from Reboux, one of Paris's largest milliners, later said of the attitude of the fashion industry during the German occupation:

We wore large hats to raise our spirits. Felt gave out, so we made them out of chiffon. Chiffon was no more. All right, take straw. No more straw? Very well, braided paper.... Hats have been a sort of contest between French imagination and German regulation.... We wouldn't look shabby and worn out; after all, we were Parisiennes.

After Paris was liberated, the idea for a miniature theatre of fashion came from Robert Ricci, son of couturier Nina Ricci. All materials were in short supply at the end of World War II, and Ricci proposed using miniature mannequins, or fashion dolls, to address the need to conserve textiles, leather, fur, fibers, and so on. The mannequins were 27.5 inches (700 mm) tall, fabricated of wire. Some 60 Paris couturiers amongst them Nina Ricci, Balenciaga, Germaine Lecomte, Mad Carpentier, Martial & Armand, Hermès, Philippe & Gaston, Madeleine Vramant, Jeanne Lanvin, Marie-Louise Bruyère and Pierre Balmain joined and volunteered their scrap materials and labour to create miniature clothes in new styles for the exhibit. Milliners created miniature hats, hairstylists gave the mannequins individual coiffures, and jewellers such as Van Cleef and Arpels and Cartier contributed small necklaces and accessories. Some seamstresses even crafted miniature undergarments to go under the couture designs. Seamstresses carried their sewing machines around with them to complete work on the Théâtre de la Mode during Paris's post-War electricity shortages. Historian Lorraine McConaghy points out the level of detail in the clothing:

The meticulous attention to details is so striking ... The buttons really button. The zippers really zip. The handbags have little stuff – little wallets, little compacts – inside them.

Once work was completed on the Théâtre de la Mode, it became a touring exhibition of 237 doll-size figurines in 15 elaborate artist-created sets. It opened at the Louvre in Paris on 28 March 1945, and was enormously popular, drawing 100,000 visitors and raising a million francs for war relief. With the success of the exhibit in Paris, the Théâtre de la Mode went on a tour of Europe, with shows in London, Leeds, Barcelona, Stockholm, Copenhagen and Vienna. To promote the exhibit abroad, a French government official wrote to the Ambassador of France in Britain: "France has little, alas to export, but she has her appreciation of beautiful things and the skill of her couture houses". After touring Europe in 1945, the mannequins were outfitted with new clothes designed for the 1946 season and the exhibition traveled to the United States, where it was displayed in New York City and San Francisco in 1946. After the final show, the mannequins were left behind in San Francisco, while the jewellery was returned to Paris.

== Restoration and later tours ==
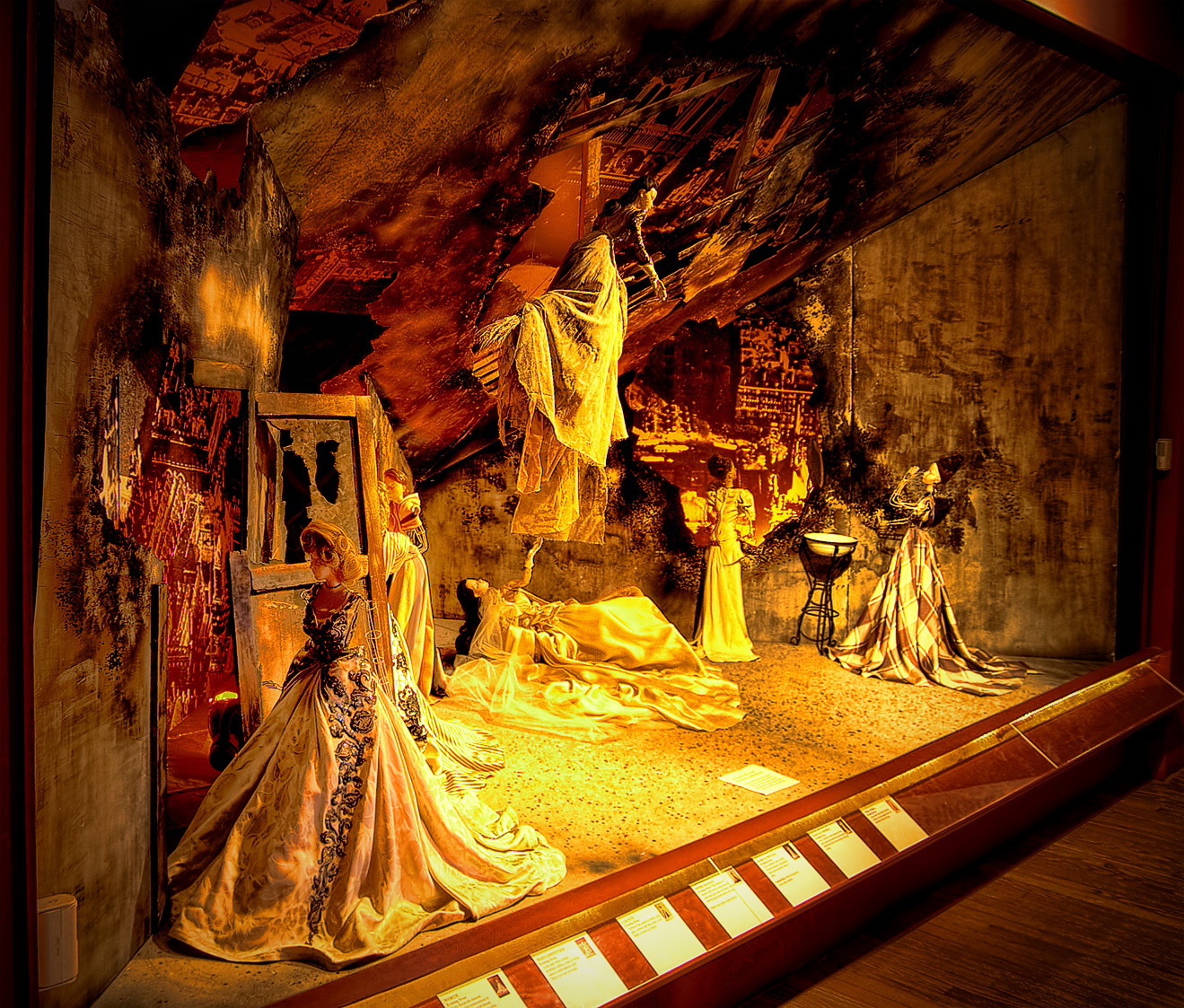
Tribute to René Clair: I Married a Witch, Jean Cocteau (1945), a restored set design for the Théâtre de la Mode.

The Maryhill Museum of Art in the United States acquired the mannequins in 1952 through a donation by art patron Alma de Bretteville Spreckels. The original sets accompanying the dolls, which had been crafted by such artists as Christian Bérard, Jean Saint-Martin, Georges Wakhevitch and Jean Cocteau, were lost before the Maryhill acquired the exhibit. In 1988, Paris's Musée de la Mode et du Textile undertook an extensive restoration of the mannequins and painstakingly recreated the sets. The Théâtre de la Mode still exhibits at the Maryhill Museum of Art by rotating selections from the complete series of mannequins and sets. Parts of the Théâtre de la Mode also tour art and fashion museums throughout the United States and worldwide.

== Impact on fashion, art, and culture ==
The art and aesthetics of Théâtre de la Mode have had lasting influence on the worlds of fashion, contemporary art, and design. In the late 1980s, the designer BillyBoy* organized an exhibition tour Le Nouveau Théâtre de la Mode (New Theatre of Fashion) sponsored by Mattel with Barbie dolls dressed by contemporary fashion designers.

Town & Country magazine reports that seminal fashion designer Christian Dior likely contributed design work to Théâtre de la Mode, and that Dior's couture collection was influenced by the display.

The Bold Doll reports that Robert Tonner, founder of the Tonner Doll Company, received design inspiration from Théâtre de la Mode when creating a wide-ranging collection of contemporary dolls; these include a limited series of dolls featuring delicate embroidery and beading for FAO Schwarz in 2001, and a doll wearing a short dance dress for the 2003 Paris Fashion Doll Festival.

The Barry Art Museum’s 2021 exhibition Karen LaMonte: Théâtre de la Mode highlights sculptures created by American artist Karen LaMonte and inspired by the original wire doll display. Works include LaMonte’s Études, miniature sculptures that depict elegant evening dresses with the wearer absent. LaMonte’s works are displayed on sets built by the Old Dominion University Theater Department alongside several of the original French figurines on loan from the Maryhill Museum.

According to W magazine, in 2020, fashion designer Maria Grazia Chiuri presented Dior's haute couture line in a miniature display inspired by Théâtre de la Mode.

== See also ==
- French fashion
