= Alexandre Vauthier =

French fashion designer (born 1971)

- Born: 30 November 1971 (age 54); Agen, France
- Education: ESMOD
- Occupation: Fashion designer
- Label: Alexandre Vauthier

Alexandre Vauthier (born 30 November 1971) is a French haute couture fashion designer.

== Career ==
He was a student at fashion school ESMOD from 1991 to 1994. After being a trainee for Thierry Mugler Couture in 2013, he became an assistant. In 1997 he moved to Jean Paul Gaultier where he was a head designer for the couture collections for eight years.

Vauthier recalls his time with Mugler fondly: "My years at Mugler were extremely formatives at all levels. He taught me to be resourceful, find solutions very quickly."

In 2009, he did his first fashion show with his own label, during Paris Fashion Week. Ever since, Christian Louboutin does the shoes for Vauthier's fashion shows.

In 2010, he created a clothing line for 3 Suisses.

In 2011, after getting a makeover to Beyoncé for her album 4, he created yule logs for the Grande Epicerie de Paris.

For the year 2012 he was the art director for the Premium range of brand Pyrenex. The same year Madonna chose him to create the look on the cover of her single Girl Gone Wild.

In 2014, he created goodies for Lancôme with Jacquemus and Yiqing Yin.

From 2011 to 2014 he was a guest member of the Chambre syndicale de la haute couture. Since December 2014, he is an official member, his fashion house being able to use the term "haute couture".

In 2024, facing significant financial difficulties linked to the Covid-19 crisis and the resulting weakening of the global retail network, the house was placed in receivership, after which it was acquired by the Californian fashion e-tailer Revolve, listed on the New York Stock Exchange.

== Style ==
Alexandre Vauthier's collections mostly consist of black and gold. White and Silver also remained prominent in his collection. For the fall-winter 2011–2012 seasons, the collection was all-red.

His clothes often feature Swarovski crystals and embroideries by Maison Lesage.

We can find a "V" (which stands for his name, Vauthier) on several clothes, as well as the jewelry.
