= Christophe Josse =

French fashion designer

- Education: Art history
- Label: Christophe Josse

Christophe Josse (pronounced [kʁistɔf ʒɔs]) is a French fashion designer and an haute couture fashion brand.

== Education ==
Christophe studied art history for three years in Paris, followed by one year in stylisme.

== Fashion career ==
Christophe Josse worked in different fashions houses as designer's assistant. Then he moved to the Haute Couture studio of the Torrente house where he soon became the first assistant of Rose Torrente-Mett, the Director of the Studio at that time. After the departure of the designer in February 2003, Christophe Josse assumed the direction of the Haute Couture collection.

Christophe Josse left Torrente in 2004 and in July 2005 presented in Paris his first couture collection under his own name. Since January 2006 the designer has been invited by the Chambre Syndicale de la Haute Couture to present his collections during the official Haute Couture calendar as "invited member". In January 2008 he opened his atelier and showroom at 231, rue Saint-Honoré, Paris.

The Chambre Syndicale de la Haute Couture Française, the governing body of the French fashion industry, promoted Christophe Josse in January 2011 from guest member to permanent member status, which allows the Christophe Josse brand to bear the "Haute Couture" label.
