= Ted Lapidus =

French fashion designer (1929–2008)

Edmond "Ted" Lapidus (23 June 1929 – 29 December 2008) was a French fashion designer. He was born in Paris, the son of a Russian-Jewish émigré tailor.

Lapidus was considered the creator and pioneer of the unisex fashion look and is credited with introducing a military and safari look into haute couture. He is credited as the first designer to put military-style shoulder straps on both male and female clothing, and with making blue jeans part of the mainstream of fashion design.

After an apprenticeship with Dior, Lapidus started his own fashion label in 1951, and gained prominence in the 1960s when French celebrities such as Brigitte Bardot, Françoise Hardy and Alain Delon started wearing his creations. Lapidus proved influential outside France, too, and was the first designer to persuade Twiggy to wear a suit and tie rather than a mini-skirt. John Lennon was another admirer and in 1969 he asked Lapidus to design a white leather bag to house a set of fourteen erotic lithographs he had made. Known as "Bag One", the limited edition of 300 bags incorporated zips, handles and a lock, as well as Lennon's signature in black, and was hand-stitched in Italy and later autographed by The Beatles. Lapidus also designed the white suit that Lennon wore on the cover of The Beatles' Abbey Road album. He was admitted to the Chambre syndicale de la haute couture parisienne in 1963. He designed the safari suit, a style of men's suit that was popular in Australia in the 1970s. In the late 1970s the Lapidus label started to produce fashion accessories as the haute couture market declined. In 1989 Ted Lapidus's son Oliver Lapidus took over the Lapidus label. Lapidus sponsored the French Automobiles Gonfaronnaises Sportives Formula One auto racing team in 1990 via the Ted Lapidus product name. In 1996 Lapidus designed both the home and away uniforms for the Sport Club Corinthians Paulista, which were used that year in the Copa Libertadores and the Copa Conmebol. In 2000 the Lapidus label ceased producing haute couture and is now primarily known for its fashion accessories of watches and fragrances.

Lapidus died in Cannes, aged 79, from pulmonary complications brought on by leukaemia. He is buried in the Père Lachaise Cemetery in Paris.
French President Nicolas Sarkozy paid tribute and said Lapidus had "democratised French elegance and classicism" and "made fashion accessible to men and women in the street." Sarkozy's statement called him "the poet of French couture".

Lapidus was married twice. He is survived by two sons, Olivier and Thomas, and a daughter, Eloise.
