= Franck Sorbier =

French grand couturier (born 1961)

Franck Sorbier (pronounced [fʁɑ̃k sɔʁbje]; born 1961) is a Paris fashion house that achieved haute couture status in 2005.

After working successfully for Chantal Thomass and Thierry Mugler, Sorbier presented his first collection in 1987. Then, some major stores, such as Bergdorf Goodman and Neiman Marcus in the United States and Seibu in Japan, noticed him. In 1995, the renowned French jeweller and watchmaker Cartier gave him the opportunity to present his winter 95/96 collection in a prestigious place, the Carrousel du Louvre. In 1996, he became a member of the French Federation of Couture and Ready-To-Wear, supported by Jean Paul Gaultier and Sonia Rykiel. In 1999, Franck Sorbier designed glasses for Vuarnet sunglasses. He presented his first couture collection that same year. As of summer 2011, Franck Sorbier has been selling seats to his couture collections through the Fonds de Dotation Sorbier website, to fund his collections.
