= Julien Fournié =

French fashion designer

- Education: Ecole de la Chambre Syndicale de la haute couture
- Label: Julien Fournié

Julien Fournié (pronounced [ʒyljɛ̃ fuʁnje]) is a French fashion designer and CEO of his own eponymous haute couture company founded in the summer of 2009. Previously, he was the last creative director of the Paris-based haute couture fashion house Torrente. In 2008, he was named creative director for womenswear, menswear and accessories at Ramosport.

== Early life ==
Julien has a Castilian mother and a French father. One set of grandparents were tanners. His other grandmother was a lingerie seamstress and corset maker. From the age of three Julien's favourite toy was the crayon, his favourite pastime: drawing.

== Fashion career ==
Fournié initially decided to study medicine and took a degree in biology. After two years he changed career to study fashion, continuing his studies at the Ecole de la Chambre Syndicale de la Couture Parisienne graduating in 2000. On his graduation day, Paris Fashion 2000 awarded him with the Moet & Chandon Prize for best accessories. During those three years of study and the apprenticeship, he worked at fashion houses to develop his skills. After an experience at Nina Ricci, he moved to Christian Dior, where he worked on accessories with Jean Mouclier, then at Givenchy haute couture.

He was starting to work at Céline when Jean-Paul Gaultier hired him as an assistant designer in haute couture. He was entrusted with researching materials and designing embroidery trims for the Autumn/Winter 2001/2002 collection. He also got to work on the stage costumes for a Madonna tour. At the end of 2001, he joined the Claude Montana studio as a stylist in ready-to-wear and accessories. There, he developed collections of bags, scarves, luggage and jewelry.

In late Summer 2003, at the age of 28, he was recruited by Torrente as Style Director for their ready-to-wear collections. In early September, before his first show for the Torrente had even taken place, the management committee voted to appoint him creative director. He has since taken over the duties of Madame Rose Torrente-Mett. After advising several ready-to-wear brands in Asia, and particularly in South Korea, as well as in the fields of accessories in France (Charles Jourdan), he was appointed in early 2008 Creative Director at another French house, Ramosport, a Parisian brand specializing in "casual chic" for womenswear and menswear. When Ramosport was bought as a company by the Groupe Georges Rech in September 2008, Fournié decided it was time to create his own brand, bearing his own name.

Thanks to one of his hand-painted dresses, he was laureate of the Grand Prix of the Creation of the City of Paris in 2010. In January 2011, on the occasion of his first participation in the Paris Fashion Week as a "guest member", he created the event by hiring an all-black cast of models to showcase his collection entitled "Premières Couleurs" / "First Colors". Similarly, his Parisian Spring/Summer 2013 fashion show created the event by featuring a very pregnant model wearing a tight-fitting black and white dress and holding her high-heeled shoes.

His fashion show held during the "French Couture Week 2012" in Singapore unintentionally garnered the attention of the media because of the fall of one of the models, who was wearing a high slit dress with a long train and very high stiletto heels. Models also fell during his Spring/Summer 2013 and Fall/Winter 2014 fashion shows, during which a model tripped several times on her dress during the final walk.

In January 2011, the Chambre Syndicale de la Haute Couture, the governing body of the French fashion industry, granted Fournié guest member status, which allowed his company to participate in the Paris Haute Couture fashion week. In January 2017, Fournié was granted full official status as an haute Couture label, which is a protected label in France, which only 14 houses worldwide can legally use.
