= Yiqing Yin =

Chinese-born, French fashion designer

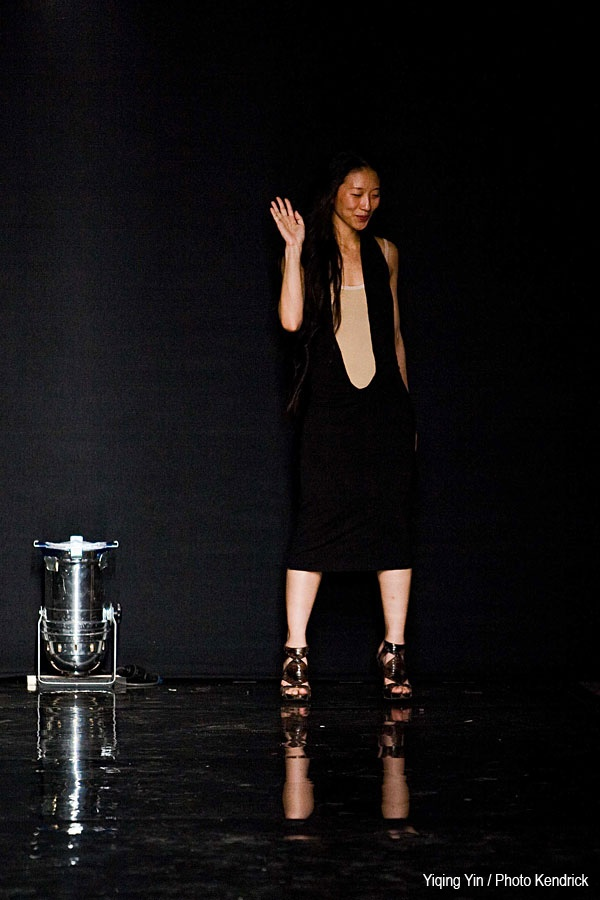
- Yiqing Yin at the end of her fashion show in July 2012
- Born: Beijing, China
- Education: Ecole de la Chambre Syndicale de la haute couture
- Label: www.yiqingyin.com

Yiqing Yin (殷亦晴; born 1985) is a Chinese-born, Paris-based haute couture designer and former official member of the Chambre Syndicale de la Haute Couture.

== Early life ==
Yin was born in Beijing in 1985, and moved to France with her family at the age of 4. She studied at the École nationale supérieure des arts décoratifs in Paris. After graduating she completed an internship at French brand Cacharel and was a clasher for 1.5 years.

== Fashion career ==
In 2010, Yin was invited to present her first collection "Exile" at the Hyères International Festival, which won her the Grand Prize of Creation from the city of Paris and the Andam Prize for First Collection. These early creations were later displayed in the windows of French Ministère de la Culture and at the Théâtre National de Chaillot in Paris. In July 2011 following her second collection Ouvrir Venus, Yin was invited to be a guest member of Chambre Syndicale de la Haute Couture by Didier Grumbach the Director of French Federation of Couture. Yin now shows her collections during the Paris Fashion Week. In 2015, Yin became one of the 14 official members of the Chambre Syndicale de la Haute Couture.

In 2014, Yin is the creative director of French brand Léonard, with her first ready-to-wear show.

From January to December 2018, Yin was the creative director of the Shinsegae-funded revival of Paul Poiret.
