= Robert Wun =

Fashion designer

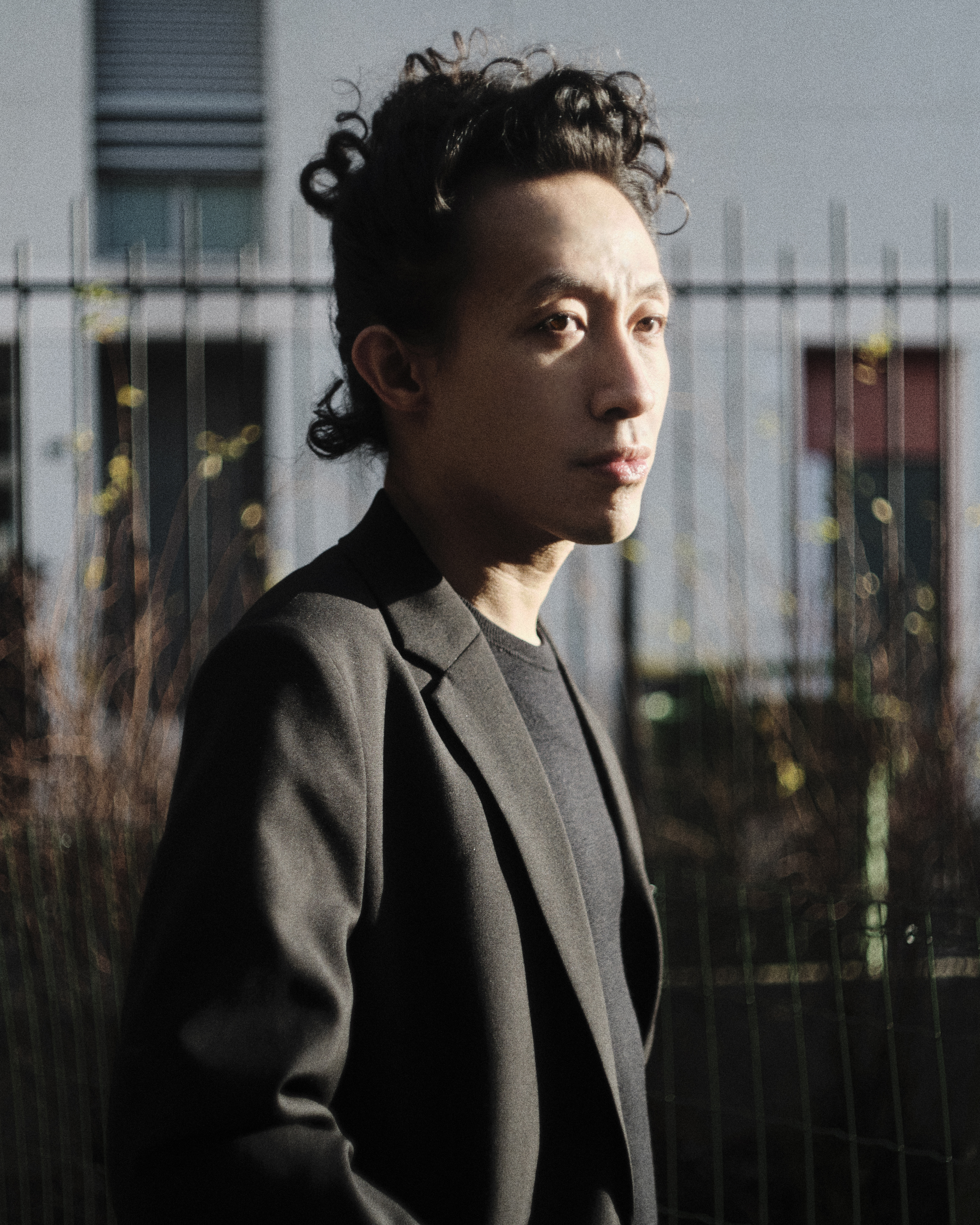
- Born: 1991 (age 34–35); Hong Kong
- Education: London College of Fashion
- Occupation: Fashion designer
- Years active: 2014 - Present
- Website: robertwun.com

Robert Wun is a Hong Kong-born London-based fashion designer. After graduating from London College of Fashion, Wun founded his fashion brand in 2014, focusing on womenswear collections.

He made history as the first fashion designer from Hong Kong to present a collection at Paris Haute Couture Week. In recent years, his label has become a prominent fixture on the red carpet, recognised for its highly conceptual, sculptural, and trompe-l'œil designs.

== Early life and education ==
Robert Wun was born in Hong Kong in 1991. He developed an early interest in fashion design at the age of 11, initially exploring thrift shopping and customising his own garments.

At the age of 17, Wun relocated to the United Kingdom to pursue his creative education, eventually enrolling at the London College of Fashion to specialise in womenswear. His 2012 graduate collection, titled 'Burnt', was discovered by Hong Kong's influential Joyce Boutique, providing Wun with vital early industry exposure upon graduating with a Bachelor of Arts in Fashion Design and Technology in 2012.

== Career ==
Following his graduation, Wun spent two years working as a freelance design assistant and editorial stylist in London to fund his early design work. In 2014, he officially launched his luxury fashion label, initially focusing on custom orders. In late 2021, he debuted his first solo museum exhibition, Robert Wun: Between Reality and Fantasy, at the SCAD FASH Museum of Fashion + Film in Atlanta, Georgia. The exhibition, which ran into 2022, prominently featured his breakthrough Fall/Winter 2021 "Tsunaia" collection alongside over forty garments from his archive and celebrity commissions. That same year, Wun was awarded the prestigious ANDAM Prix Spécial, receiving a €100,000 prize. In January 2023, with the support of Chanel president Bruno Pavlovsky, Wun debuted his first official couture collection during Paris Haute Couture Week as a guest member of the Fédération de la Haute Couture et de la Mode.

Following his debut on the haute couture schedule, Wun has continued to show critically acclaimed collections in Paris. For his Spring/Summer 2026 haute couture collection, titled "Valour: The Desire to Create, and the Courage to Carry On", Wun presented at the Théâtre du Lido. The collection explored the existential role of couture and featured his signature imposing shoulder and hip silhouettes, alongside dramatic trompe-l'œil breastplates and a gemstone-encrusted finale gown.

Later that year, his Autumn/Winter 2026 collection "Childsplay" explored the tension between exacting couture craftsmanship and childhood imagination. The runway featured Pollock-style paint-splattered suits, voluminous gowns carrying custom balloons, and direct references to fairy-tale figures like Cinderella and Harlequin.

== Design philosophy and aesthetic ==
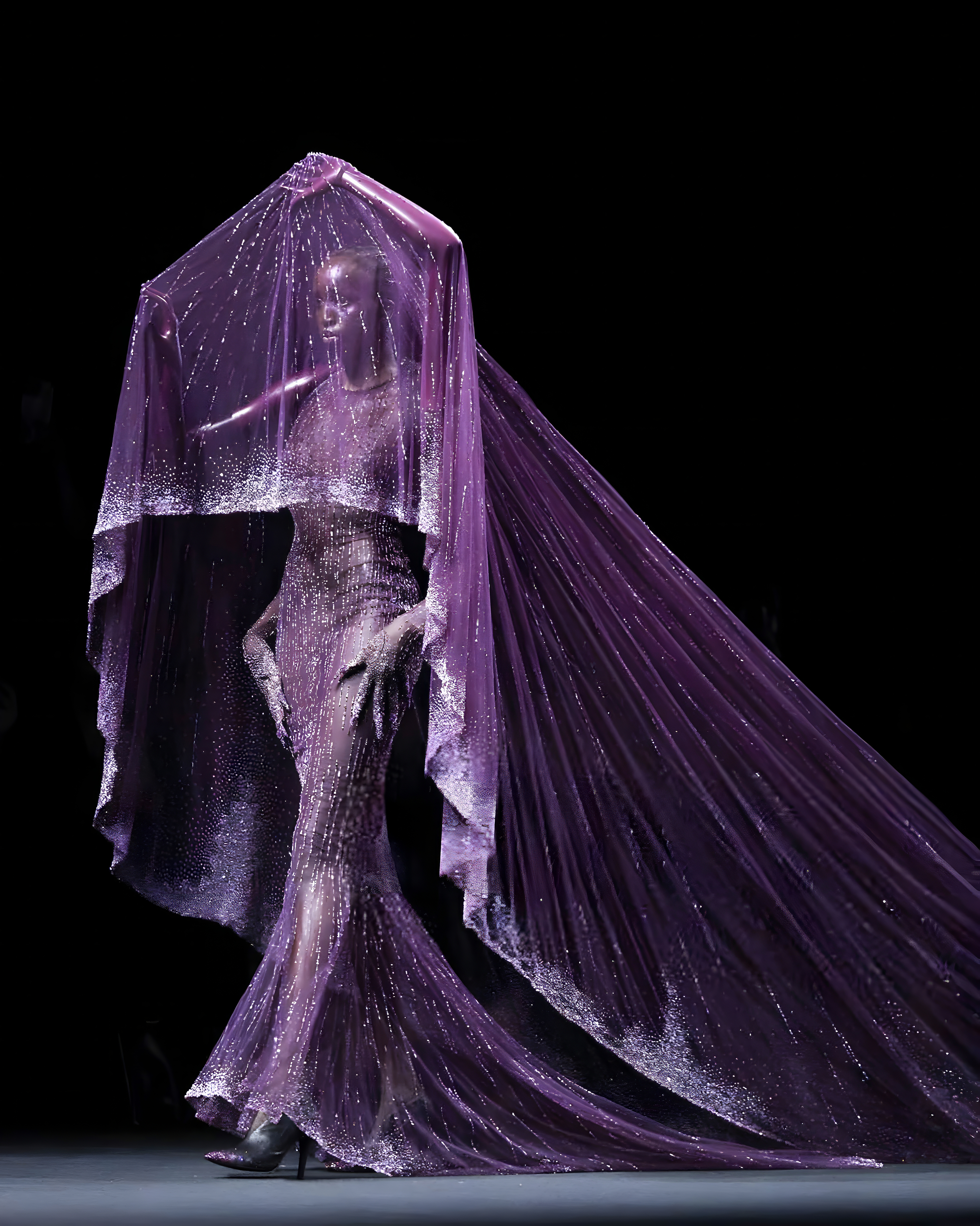
FW25 “BECOMING” Look 23 - “Purple Rain”

Wun's design philosophy is rooted in the contrast between organic forms and artificial, futuristic execution. His work frequently draws inspiration from the natural world, particularly the anatomy of insects, butterflies, and floral structures, which he translates into sharp, architectural tailoring and dramatic pleated silhouettes.

Rejecting mass-market ready-to-wear, Wun built his brand around custom storytelling and high-level craftsmanship. His aesthetic often explores the tension between perfection and flaw, utilising materials like neoprene, foam, and manipulated fabrics to create pieces that act as protective, sculptural armour.

== Notable clients and Commissions ==
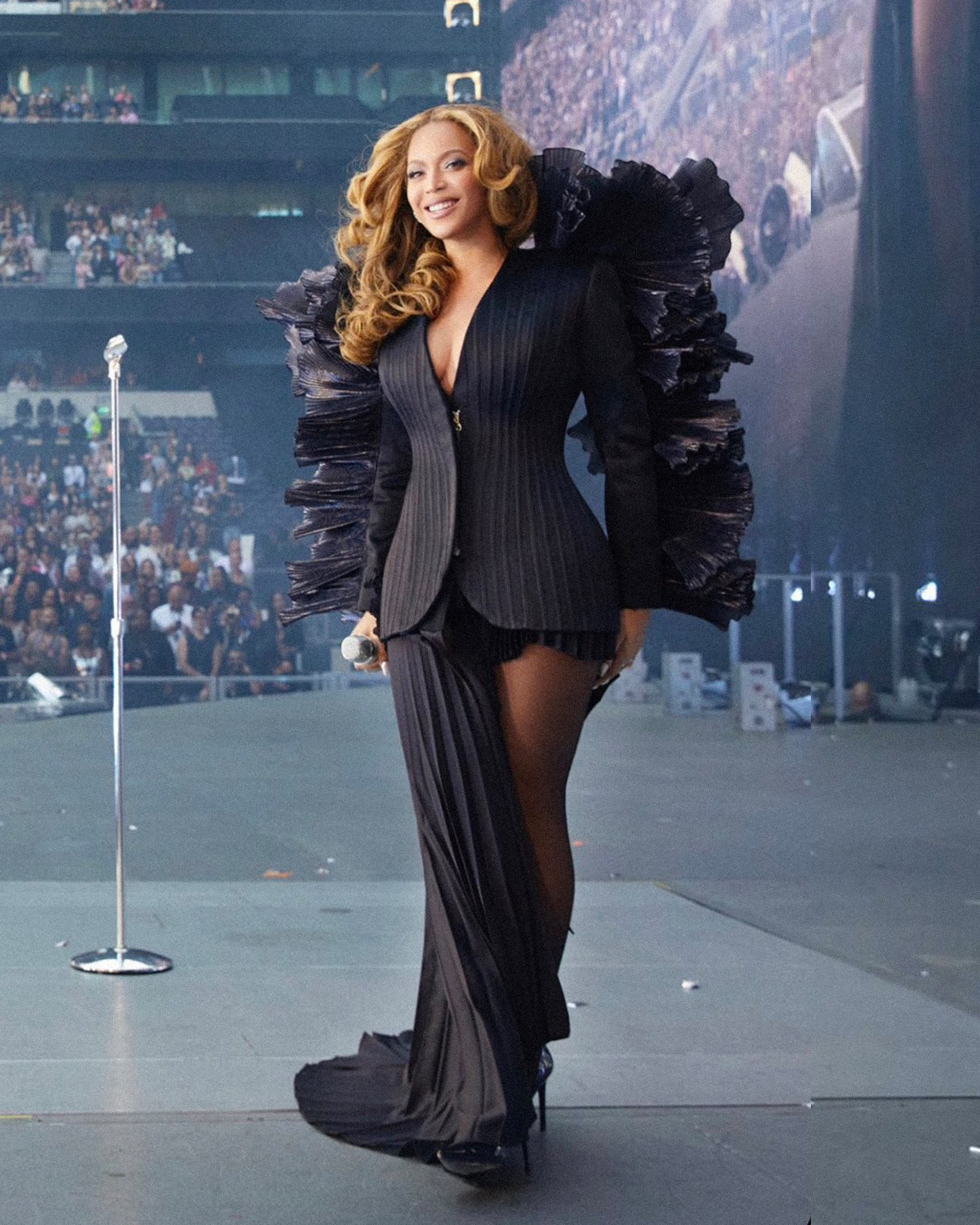
Beyoncé in custom Robert Wun for the Renaissance World Tour 2023

Wun's designs have made his fashion label a prominent fixture on the red carpet. He has created custom and archival looks for numerous high-profile celebrities, including Lady Gaga, Cardi B, Celine Dion, and Björk. Notably, he designed a custom Swarovski-crystal couture gown for Naomi Osaka at the Met Gala, and later collaborated with Nike to create her viral jellyfish-inspired, couture walk-on entrance look for the 2026 Australian Open. Beyoncé famously wore his crystallised "Stargaze Gown" inside the 2026 Met Gala while serving as the event's co-chair. His custom pieces have also been featured prominently during Lady Gaga's concert performances, in her "Runway" music video, and on Saturday Night Live.

Beyond celebrity red carpet dressing, Wun's approach has led to significant cultural and cinematic commissions. In 2015, he designed costumes for the blockbuster film The Hunger Games: Mockingjay – Part 2. The following year, he was commissioned by The Royal Ballet in London to create pieces for choreographer Wayne McGregor's 10th-anniversary performance. He has also collaborated on commercial projects with the acclaimed Hong Kong film director Wong Kar-wai.

== Couture Collections ==
| Year | Season | Collection | Brief Description |
| 2023 | Spring/Summer 2023 Couture | “FEAR” | Robert Wun's debut into Couture, the collection is not about fear, this collection is about confronting fear, embracing it, and turning it into something beautiful. |
| 2024 | Autumn/Winter 2024 Couture | “TIME” | An exploration of the ephemeral nature of existence through a cinematic lens, articulating the passage of time with sophisticated design that exude emotional depth. |
| 2024 | Spring/Summer 2024 Couture | "FOR LOVE" | An exploration of love behind what we do, the people who inspire us, and the memories that stay with us. |
| 2024 | Hong Kong Presentation | “HOMECOMING” | Robert Wun's 10-year anniversary in couture, this collection was an homage to his Grandmother and the women of Hong Kong. |
| 2025 | Autumn/Winter 2025 Couture | “BECOMING” | Delving into the emotional ritual of dressing and undressing, human desire for escapism and personal transformation. |
| 2026 | Spring/Summer 2026 Couture | “VALOUR” | The Desire to Create, and the Courage to Carry On |
| 2026 | Fall/Winter 2026/27 Couture | “CHILDSPLAY” | A surreal and beautiful exploration of childhood, growth and evolution through time. |

== Awards & Recognition ==
| Year | Recognition | Organisation | Notes |
| 2016 | International Woolmark Prize nomination | The Woolmark Company | A global fashion award for emerging designers working with Merino wool. |
| 2022 | ANDAM Fashion Awards - Prix Spécial Award | ANDAM | Won the Special Prize, a major recognition for emerging fashion talent, with mentoring support alongside the prize. |
| 2022 | ANDAM mentorship with Bruno Pavlovsky | ANDAM | |
| 2022 | Tatler Asia's influence in Fashion recognition | Tatler Asia | Recognised by Tatler Asia as one of the most influential individuals in fashion. |
| 2022 | Vogue Business 100 | Vogue Business | Included in Vogue Business's list of influential industry figures. |
| 2022 | Wallpaper* China - Designer of the Year nomination | Wallpaper* China | Nominated for Designer of the Year by Wallpaper China. |
| 2022 | Elle China - Special Designer | Elle China | Recognised as Elle China's Special Designer. |
| 2023 | FHCM Guest House - official Haute Couture calendar entry | Fédération de la Haute Couture et de la Mode | Added to the official couture calendar |
| 2023 | The Fashion Awards - New Establishment Womenswear nomination | British Fashion Council | Nominated in the New Establishment Womenswear category at The Fashion Awards 2023. |
| 2025 | BoF 500 Class of 2025 | Business of Fashion | Recognised by Business of Fashion in its 2025 BoF 500 class. |
