= École de la chambre syndicale de la couture parisienne =

Private fashion college in Paris, France

L'École de la chambre syndicale de la couture parisienne is a private institution of higher education in the creative professions founded in 1927 by the Chambre Syndicale de la Haute Couture.

The school provides training in fashion and haute couture techniques and has been located in the 2nd arrondissement of Paris since 2010.

In 2019, the École de la chambre syndicale de la couture parisienne and the Institut Français de la Mode (IFM), founded in 1986, merged to create the new Institut français de la mode.

== Notable alumni ==
- Julien Fournié – a French fashion designer
- Nicole Miller – an American fashion designer; lives and works in the United States of America
- Sirivannavari of Thailand – a Thai princess
