= Imane Ayissi =

Cameroonian model, and fashion designer

Imane Ayissi (born 1969) is a Cameroonian dancer, performer, model, and haute couture fashion designer.

== Early life ==
Ayissi is the son of Jean-Baptiste Ayissi Ntsama, a champion boxer, and Julienne Honorine Eyenga Ayissi, the first crowned Miss Cameroon after the country gained independence in 1960. His brothers and sisters are dancers and singers. During his childhood, he was a member of the Ballet National du Cameroun. He toured with Patrick Dupont and other singers and choreographers. In 1986, he attended the ECCAS summit gala at the Yaoundé Conference Center, in the presence of seven heads of state from Zaire, Gabon, Chad, Congo, Equatorial Guinea, Ivory Coast, and Cameroon. A few years later, in 1992, the Ayissi brothers accompanied Yannick Noah on his Saga Africa European tour.

In 1987, he received the Medal of Honor of the French Republic at the Dijon International Gastronomic Fair. In 1990, he attended the gala of the seventh summit of the Lake Chad Basin Commission at the Unity Palace in Yaoundé, in the presence of the heads of state of Niger, Cameroon, Chad, and Nigeria. He also won two cultural friendship trophies with the Indomitable Lions of Cameroon at the 1990 FIFA World Cup in Italy. He then joined the National Ballet of Cameroon, and danced with several African artists for video clips, concerts, television sets and others including Nayanka Bell, Kéké Kassiry, Baba Maal, Anne-Marie Nzié, Beti Beti, Marthe Zambo, Messi Martin, Gilbratar Drakus, Mama Wandja, André-Marie Tala, Georges Seba, Nabou Diop (Touré Kounda) or in the Senegalese ballet Saf Tékékou, and the Guinean ballet Tonton Cofi directed by the choreographer Jemes Sylla.

== Career ==
Finalist in the Model Europe competition organized by Casting Magazine in 1995 in Paris, he moved to France in the 1990s and worked as a model for Dior, Givenchy, and Lanvin.

Imane Ayissi’s dedication to fashion began during his childhood in Cameroon, where he crafted his first designs for his mother. Since launching his professional path in 1992 with annual collections, he achieved a significant milestone in 1996 by presenting at the Nuit des Créateurs at the Palace in Paris. That same year, he gained public acclaim by winning the audience vote on the France 3 television program "Je passe à la télé."

His work is defined by collaborations with an extensive array of prominent figures. He has dressed iconic top models including Katoucha Niane, Esther Kamatari, and Rebecca Ayoko, among many others. His reach extends to athletes like Maud Fontenoy and Laura Flessel, media personalities such as Vanessa Dolmen and Elizabeth Tchoungui (for whom he designed a wedding dress), and renowned artists including Princess Erika, Jocelyn Beroard, and the writer Calixte Beyala.

A frequent guest at global festivals, Ayissi provided the wardrobe for the "Ébène Top Model" competitions in Martinique and Senegal. His collections have been showcased at prestigious institutions and events, such as the Lions Club International, the 2003 Arts Week at Sciences Po Paris, and "Africa Week" at INSEAD in 2004. Notably, he presented his work during International Francophonie Day in 2004 before dignitaries such as Abdou Diouf.

The designer has often used his platform for humanitarian causes, including a fashion show for a LICRA gala benefiting children in the Congo. His aesthetic has also been integrated into the luxury and beauty industries; his dresses served as the backdrop for Swarovski jewelry at the Carrousel du Louvre, and he has been a featured designer for major hair shows such as Claude Maxime, Vog Coiffure Paris, and the Mondial Coiffure at the Palais des Congrès. Ayissi founded his own label in 2004. His designs have been worn by Zendaya and Angela Bassett.

Beyond haute couture, Imane Ayissi has ventured into accessible fashion, notably through a 2003 collaboration with the brand Multiples and the design of a draped top for La Redoute in 2006. His ready-to-wear line, "Sept & Imane Ayissi," earned him a finalist spot for the Grand Prix de la Création de la Ville de Paris in late 2006.

His aesthetic is defined by a mastery of jersey and a fluid silhouette, blending traditional African textiles with luxury silks like taffeta, organza, and lace. Since 2010, he has shared this creative philosophy as a regular guest speaker at the Institut Français de la Mode (IFM). His global influence is further evidenced by the Afro-Brazilian Museum in São Paulo, which acquired pieces from his 2014 and 2015 collections for its permanent archives.

Cultural Projects and Historic Milestones The designer’s work often intersects with film and social causes. In 2007, he designed costumes and jewelry for Jean-Pierre Bekolo’s video Africaine dans l'espace, featured at the Musée du Quai Branly. He also supported the Krys Foundation’s "100,000 Glasses" campaign to benefit those in need in Africa and Brazil.

He is a guest member of the Chambre Syndicale de la Haute Couture.

He is the first black African designer to have his designs shown on the Paris haute couture catwalk. Only two other African designers have shown at the Paris show: Alphadi (Nigeria) in 2004 and Noureddine Amir (Morocco) in 2018.

In January 2020, fashion critics such as Emmanuelle Courrèges, note that he transcends Western-style fashion, introducing a distinct perspective reminiscent of the impact made by Japanese designers in previous decades.

Commitment to the African Fashion Industry Despite his global stature, Ayissi remains deeply rooted in the African creative ecosystem. He systematically presents his collections on the continent following their Paris debut and has been a steadfast mentor at the Cameroon Fashion Designers Center (CCMC) for nearly a decade. As the artistic director of the Fashion Industry Forum’s closing show, he advocates for the professionalization of the sector. He emphasizes that for fashion to move beyond mere spectacle into a viable economic industry, it requires dedicated governmental support.

== Chronology of Fashion Shows ==
1992–1999: Early shows in Paris including Koué Meutouana (1992), Bilik (1993), and Eternity (1999) at venues such as Espace Cardin.

2000–2004: Presentations including Badjaga at the Eiffel Tower (2000) and his 10th-anniversary show, The Dance of Fabrics, at Hôtel Bristol (2004).

2006–2007: Launch of the "Sept & Imane Ayissi" ready-to-wear collections and the Next Queens show in Paris.

2009–2010: International expansion with shows in Rome (Voodoo Mood) and Switzerland (Fashion Ghost), the latter featuring a collection made entirely of organic cotton.

2011–2012: Collections such as Idoutt and Mimbak in Paris, followed by Okiri at Lagos Fashion Week.

2013–2015: High-profile Paris Haute Couture and Fashion Week shows including Grace J (a tribute to Grace Jones), Mindzing, Meullara, and Beussanda.

2016: Asseulénn Maison des Métallos (Haute Couture Week), Paris

2017: Heroos, Avenue Marceau, Paris

2018: Karralokga, Mona Bismarck Foundation, Paris

2019: Mbeuk Idourrou, Mona Bismarck Foundation, Paris

2020: Akouma / Amal-Si (Digital), Official Haute Couture Calendar Member, Paris

2024: Abeung Sanda Iyé / Akalann, Couture Collections, Paris

2025: MSSAM/ASSOU, Spring/Summer Couture, Paris
