= Madeleine Vramant =

French couturier

Madeleine Vramant was a member of the Chambre Syndicale de la Haute Couture and one of only a few couturiers that kept their fashion house open during World War II, along with Jacques Fath, Maggy Rouff, Nina Ricci and Marcel Rochas.
