= Adeline André =

French fashion designer (born 1949)

- Born: 1949 (age 76–77); Bangui, French Equatorial Africa
- Education: Ecole de la Chambre Syndicale de la Couture Parisienne
- Occupation: fashion designer
- Years active: 1966–present
- Labels: Adeline André (1981–present); Christian Dior (1970–1981)

Adeline André (pronounced [ad(ə)lin ɑ̃dʁe]; born in 1949) is a French fashion designer and the head of one of the sixteen haute couture design houses in Paris.

== Early life ==
She was born in Bangui, French Equatorial Africa in 1949 and studied at the Ecole de la Chambre Syndicale de la Couture Parisienne. After her graduation in 1970 she entered the House of Christian Dior as an assistant for Haute Couture collections, working next Marc Bohan.

== Career ==
In 1981 she formed her own designer house, Adeline André. That same year she also registered her most famous fashion innovation, the "three sleeve holes" at the French National Industrial Property Institute and 1982 at the World Intellectual Property Organization. Examples of this three sleeve holes garment are in the collections of French Fashion Museum, Palais Galliera in Paris, the Fashion Institute of Technology in New York and the Fashion and Design Museum in Lisbon.

In May 1997, André became an 'invited member' of the Syndicate Chamber of Parisian Haute Couture and a 'permanent member' since January 2005. She is currently the head designer at the fashion house that bears her name. André also teaches color at her alma mater, participates in gallery and museum exhibitions, and designs costumes for ballet, opera and theater.

== Award ==
- 1997: Officer of the Order of Arts and Letters
