= Louis Féraud =

French fashion designer (1921 -1999)

Louis Féraud (13 February 1921 – 28 December 1999) was a French fashion designer and artist.

In 1950, Louis Féraud created his first "Maison de Couture" in Cannes and by 1955 had established a couture house in Paris on 88, Rue du Faubourg Saint Honoré and 57, rue Pierre-Charron.

From the mid-1950s, he dressed the Parisian elite and designed Brigitte Bardot's wardrobe for many of her movies. However, it wasn't until 1958 that he presented his first haute couture collection in Paris.

In the early 1960s, Louis Féraud hired the designers Jean-Louis Scherrer, Margit Brandt, and Per Spook.

In 1970, he signed a contract with Fink (Germany) for a ladies' prêt-à-porter (ready-to-wear) collection. 1978 was an excellent one for Féraud: he won the "Golden Thimble Award" for his Spring/Summer 1978 Haute Couture Collection. He went on to claim this accolade again in 1984.

In 1981, he created the fragrance Fantasque and selected Avon Cosmetics to distribute it in 1982. It was the company's first designer perfume and proved an instant success. Feraud followed up with two more fragrances created in collaboration with Avon: Vivage in 1984 and Cote d'Azur in 1988.

Meanwhile, his honours collection continued growing when Louis Féraud was elected Prince de l'Art de Vivre in 1991. In 1995, the French President decorated him as Officier de la Légion d'honneur. His daughter Kiki signed her first Haute Couture collection with Féraud in 1996. In September 1999, the Dutch group Secon acquired Féraud. He died that December, aged 78, after a long and severe battle with Alzheimer's.

The year 2000 saw Yvan Mispelaere join the group as artistic director, and that July witnessed his first Haute Couture fashion show in the "Musée des Monuments Français" in Paris. In 2002, the German Group ESCADA took 90% of the Féraud shares, and Yvan Mispelaere left the company. Later that year, Féraud concentrated its activities on ladies' ready-to-wear and licences, and Jean-Paul Knott was selected as Creative Director for the luxury ready-to-wear market.

In 2003, Jean-Paul Knott left Féraud, and in July, the worldwide flagship store opened in Paris at 400 rue Saint-Honoré.
