= Georges Hobeika =

Lebanese fashion designer

Co-Creative Directors Georges & Jad Hobeika
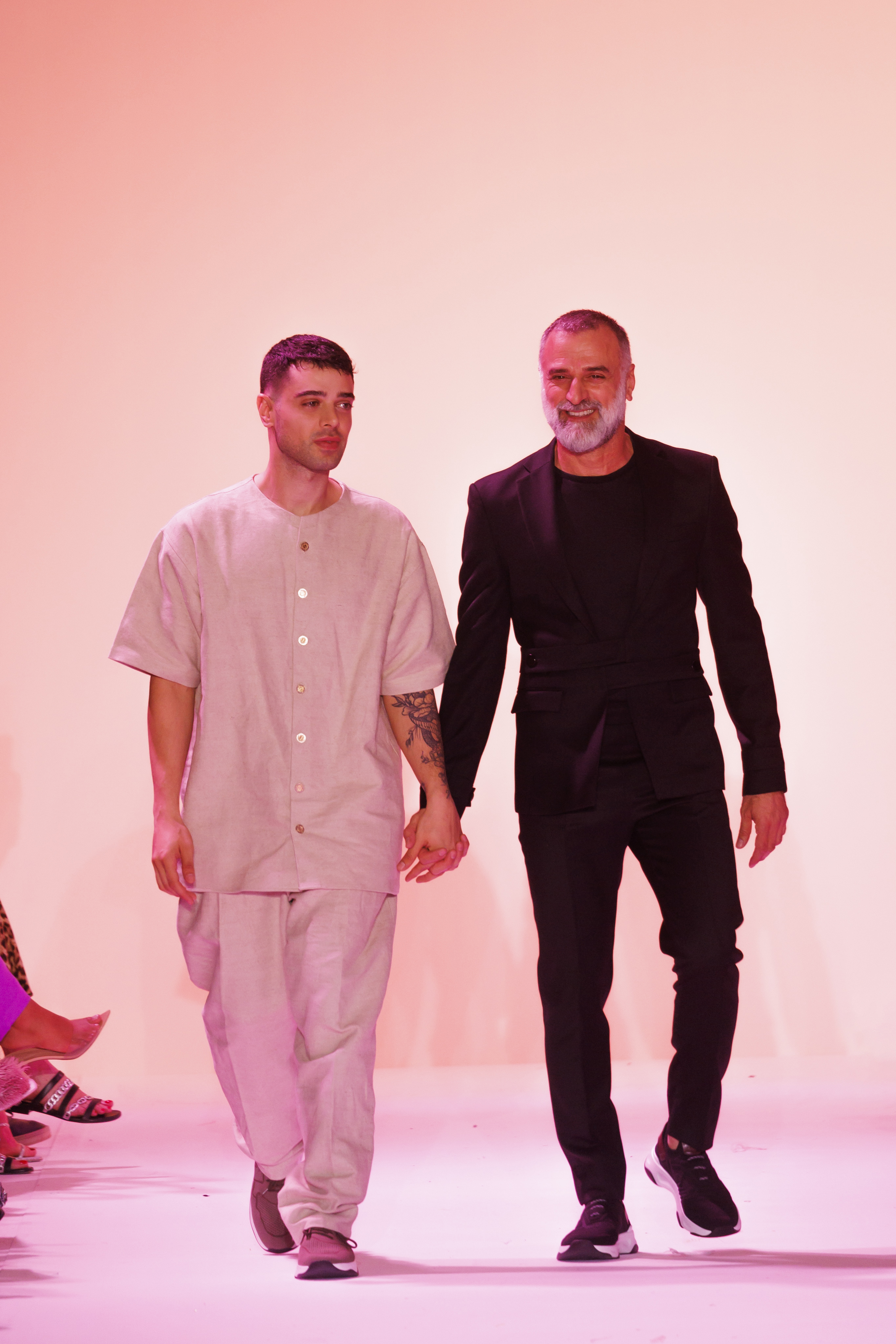
- Website: www.georgeshobeika.com

Georges Hobeika is a Lebanese multinational luxury fashion house founded by Lebanese fashion designer of Couture and Ready-to-Wear clothing, Georges Hobeika. Hobeika officially opened his atelier in Beirut, Lebanon in 1995, and has been presenting his collections in Paris for over a decade.

In 2022, Jad Hobeika, the son of Georges Hobeika, was unveiled as the Co-Creative Director of the fashion house, collaborating with his father. Today, Hobeika owns and manages his fashion house which includes four lines: Georges Hobeika Couture – Georges Hobeika Bridal – Georges Hobeika Signature – GH by Georges Hobeika. Georges Hobeika operates the fashion label from his showroom on the Rue Royale in Paris and from his atelier headquarters in Beirut.

== Georges Hobeika, The Founder ==
Hobeika was born in Baskinta, a village in the mountains of Lebanon, and was one of eight siblings. Hobeika studied civil engineering in university, and pursued architectural design in his studies. The Lebanese Civil War forced him to leave the country in order to secure a better future for him and his family. Hobeika traveled to Paris and worked as an intern for several Parisian fashion houses. After returning from Paris, Hobeika opened his first atelier location in Beirut, Lebanon in 1995.

== Georges Hobeika, The Design Label ==
In 2001, Hobeika had his first show in Paris. Hobeika has shown his couture collections in every biannual Paris Fashion Week since. In 2010, Hobeika opened a showroom in Paris. The Georges Hobeika brand is currently headed from Beirut. Hobeika has diversified into a décor line of couture furnishings and home accessories.

== Fashion Shows ==
Fashion Show	Date	Theme
Couture FW 2022-2023	July 4, 2022	Eternal Gifts
Couture FW 2023-2024	July 3, 2023	Un Reve
Couture Spring 2022	January 24, 2022	First Kiss
Couture Spring 2023	January 23, 2023	Small Talk
RTW FW 2022-2023	March 1, 2022	A Martian Breeze
RTW FW 2023-2024	March 1, 2023	Vamp
RTW Spring 2022	October 4, 2022	Orchidee Precieuse
RTW Spring 2023	September 29, 2022	Flamingo Club
Bridal Fall 2023	November 10, 2022	Bridal Fall 2023
Bridal Spring 2023	May 19, 2022	Bridal Spring 2023
Bridal Spring 2024	May 2, 2023	Bridal Spring 2024

== GH Celebrities ==
Lady Gaga

Beyoncé

Jennifer Lopez

Zendaya

Rita Ora

Lily Collins

Cardi B

Chrissy Teigen

Ciara

Cindy Bruna

Kylie Minogue

Kelly Rolland

Bella Thorne

Anitta

Monica Bellucci

Catherine Zetta Jones

Halle Bailey

Heidi Klum

Leonie Hanne

Izabel Goulart

Alessandra Ambrosio

Jasmine Tooks

Sydney Sweeney

Jessica Wang

Charli D'Amelio

Winnie Harlow

Olivia Palermo

Sarah Hyland

Fan Bingbing

Angela Baby

Aishwarya Rai

Priyanka Chopra

Hande Erçel

Maluma

Balqees Fathi

Nancy Ajram

Yousra

Tara Emad

Salma Abu Deif

Dorra Zarrouk
