= Julie de Libran =

French fashion designer (born 1972)

Julie de Libran (born February 23, 1972) is a French fashion designer. She has worked for leading fashion houses such as Gianfranco Ferré, Gianni Versace, Prada and Louis Vuitton. She specializes in women’s fashion, celebrity and event dressing and made-to-measure. In May 2014, she was named the artistic director of Sonia Rykiel. In June 2019, she launched her own fashion line, Julie de Libran Paris, a women’s made-to-order couture collection.

== Early life ==
De Libran was born in Aix-en-Provence, in the south of France, and raised in Vernègues, a small village close to Les Baux-de-Provence. When de Libran was eight years old, she moved to the United States with her family and spent the 1980s in San Diego. At a very early age she began to be passionate about fashion, creativity and design, and at high school, started drawing some sketches and taking them to a seamstress.

== Education ==
In 1990, de Libran went to Italy to study fashion. She went to the Istituto Artistico dell’Abbigliamento Marangoni in Milan where she studied fashion design and pattern making. She then went to Paris, to study draping at École de la chambre syndicale de la couture parisienne.

== Career ==
=== Early beginnings ===
From 1991 to 1994, de Libran worked in Milan with Gianfranco Ferré on his own brand while he was also designing Christian Dior. She worked close to Gianfranco Ferré on his women's collections and she designed his line Oaks by Ferré and Ferré Jeans Collection.

In 1994, de Libran moved to Paris, and worked with Jean-Charles de Castelbajac designing his women’s collection. In 1996 she went back to Italy to Gianni Versace where she assisted Gianni and then Donatella Versace on his and then her Women's Collection and Atelier Collection shown in Paris. In 1998 she joined Prada for 10.5 years as the design director for women’s ready-to-wear, lingerie, and VIP and celebrities dressing. Working beside Miuccia Prada she helped establish the Italian firm with celebrity and event dressing. She created in 2003 the Prada made-to-measure atelier in Paris.

=== Louis Vuitton, 2008–2014 ===
From 2008 to 2014, de Libran joined the French fashion house Louis Vuitton where she was the womenswear creative and studio director. She worked very closely with Marc Jacobs on all the creative process for ready-to-wear, accessories, ad campaigns and fashion shows. She was the designer of Icons, the house's line of classic pieces, as well as the cruise and pre-fall collections. In 2013 The Telegraph called her "Louis Vuitton's secret weapon".

=== Sonya Rykiel, 2014–2019 ===
On May 15, 2014, de Libran was named artistic director of Sonia Rykiel overlooking all lines of Sonia Rykiel’s womenswear and accessories, Sonia By Sonia Rykiel, the children's line and the home collection. Her first collection for Sonia Rykiel, Spring Summer 2015, was shown in Paris in September 2014. Her pre-fall 2015 show was held at the Jane Hotel in New York in January 2015. Her fall 2015-2016 show took place in the Saint-Germain-des-Pres store in March 2015. On that occasion, de Libran worked with publisher Thomas Lenthal and artist André Saraiva to transform the Sonia Rykiel flagship store into a bookstore filled with 50,000 books. In 2016, she collaborated with contemporary Spanish-American artist Maggie Cardelús to create a print for the autumn-winter collection. In July 2018, de Libran was invited by the Chambre Syndicale de la Haute Couture to show Sonia Rykiel's first ever couture collection named l'Atelier. In September 2018, Julie de Libran showed her spring summer 2019 collection on the new Allée Sonia Rykiel, a Parisian street named after the late designer Sonia Rykiel.

=== Julie de Libran, 2019–present ===
After her departure from Sonia Rykiel in March 2019, de Libran showed her debut eponymous collection of 21 looks in her own home on June 30, 2019. Her collection was sustainably-minded, each dress being made to order in limited quantities from end-of-roll fabrics.

In December 2019, the Chambre syndicale de la Haute Couture announces that de Libran would be showing her second collection under her brand, as a guest member during the official couture week in Paris in January 2020.

In 2021, de Libran collaborated for her collection with Eres, Charvet, and Goossens, respectively famous for lingerie, shirt making, and costume jewelry.

In January 2022, de Libran opened her first physical boutique on the Left Bank in Paris, France.
