= Peet Dullaert =

Dutch Fashion designer

- Born: 1989 (age 36–37); The Netherlands
- Education: ArtEZ University of Arts
- Occupation: Fashion designer
- Years active: 2012 - present
- Known for: Peet Dullaert (brand)
- Awards: Frans Molenaar-prijs
- Website: Official website

Peet Dullaert is a Dutch fashion designer, couturier and entrepreneur based in Paris, France. He is the founder of the eponymous brand, Peet Dullaert, which he founded in 2012. Dullaert was awarded with the Frans Molenaar-prijs in 2012 and was nominated for the 2016 International Woolmark Prize for his contribution in the fashion industry.

== Biography ==
=== Early life and career ===
Dullaert was born in The Netherlands in 1989. He attended ArtEZ University of Arts in Arnhem where he graduated with honors in 2012. During his years at the ArtEZ, Dullaert won the Triumph Innovation Award in 2010. He interned at Lanvin where he also assisted Alber Elbaz in Loïc Prigent's 2011 documentary, Le Jour d'Avant - Lanvin. In 2012, at the age of 23, Dullaert was awarded with Frans Molenaar-prijs. Later that year, Dullaert founded his independent brand, Peet Dullaert, specializing in haute couture, ready-to-wear and fashion accessories. Soon after its establishment, the Peet Dullaert brand received coverage and reviews from international fashion media including Vogue China and Vogue Brasil.

In the early days with his brand, the designer reflects with pioneers in the fashion industry such as Pierre Bergé and Baroness Hélène de Ludinghausen, the former Directrice of Yves Saint Laurent Haute Couture, on the past and context of the industry at that time. These conversations aided Dullaert in the creation of his sustainable and responsible production cycle for luxury and his desire for change, which was implemented in 2014. His concept through his label has been described to shake up the world of luxury by rethinking its processes and representation, and encouraging a shift towards more responsible practices. For his commitment to the oceans and sustainable fashion practices, he has been recognised by Vogue France as one of the designers who are environmentally engaged, and work to make a difference for the oceans.

In 2013, Dullaert launched, Muses With Extraordinary Lives, a project honoring women from around the world who share their stories and advocacies. Prominent women of the fashion industry such as Zuleika Ponsen, Linda Spierings, Sylvia Gobbel, Amanda Lear and Pat Cleveland were featured sharing their vision through interviews, and appearances in the designer's clothing.

In 2015, Dullaert's launched his accessories line, Le Sac Si. The ad campaign for Le Sac Si included models of all ages which received wide coverage including that from American Vogue on his efforts to show representation of women of all ages. Dullaert was one of the first designers contributing to redefine the method of ready-to-wear production, after setting up his collections to function on a "See now, Order now" basis. He modernised the process by making the ready-to-wear collections available for immediate sale after the launch and produces each piece in-house following each order placed, instead of the ready-to-wear industry's traditional production line set-up, taking factories six months to deliver.

In 2016, Dullaert was awarded with the Dutch nomination for the International Woolmark Prize and represented The Netherlands in the 2017 competition held in Milan, Italy.

According to Vogue Italy, Dullaert's design aims to reflect an eminently poetic universe which is marked by freedom of movement for today's lifestyle. Veteran fashion publicist Albert Ayal was quoted in The Zoe Report, "[sic] Peet Dullaert's accessories look like something you would see in a museum".

Dullaert's collections have been worn by celebrities around the world including Mouna Ayoub, Kendall Jenner, Jaime Xie, Katy Perry, and Rihanna.

=== Recognitions ===
- 2010 : Triumph Innovation Award.
- 2012 : Frans Molenaar-prijs.
- 2016 : Dutch Nomination International Woolmark Prize 2017.
