= Anne Valérie Hash =

French fashion designer (born 1971)

- Born: 1971 (age 54–55); Paris, France
- Education: Chambre Syndicale de la Couture Parisienne (graduated 1995)
- Occupation: Haute couture fashion designer
- Notable work: Signature collection of handmade and ready-to-wear pieces

Anne Valerie Hash (pronounced [an valeʁi aʃ]; born 1971) is a French haute couture fashion designer.

== Biography ==
She graduated from the Chambre Syndicale de la Couture Parisienne in 1995, and designed for such other labels as Nina Ricci, Chloé, and Chanel. In 1995, she opened a small bridal business. Five years later, she became business partners with Philippe Elkoubi, and launched a signature collection of handmade and ready-to-wear pieces, inspired by 14-year-old Parisian, Lou Liza Lesage. She presented her first collection in 2001.

For the 2014 Fall fashion season, her label will not present any collection.

== Exhibitions ==
In 2005, Hash participated in the Fashion in Motion series at the Victoria and Albert Museum in London, where her work was presented in a live runway format.

In 2016, The Cité de la Dentelle et de la Mode of Calais (France) is hosting an exhibition on the creations of Anne Valérie Hash. This exhibition - the first dedicated to her in France – takes a look at her first 13 years of designing. "Anne Valérie Hash. Décrayonner" explore of a world still under construction.
