= Jean-Louis Scherrer =

French fashion designer and couturier (1935 – 2013)

- Born: 19 February 1935; Paris, France
- Died: 20 June 2013 (aged 78); Paris, France
- Label: Jean-Louis Scherrer
- Awards: Legion of Honour (2009)

Jean-Louis Scherrer (19 February 1935 – 20 June 2013) was a Parisian fashion designer and couturier. Although he had name recognition and was known for his work, he is mainly noted for being the first couture designer to be sacked from their own-name label in 1992.

== Career ==
Born in Paris, Scherrer trained as a dancer at the Conservatoire de Paris until he injured his back, which put him out of action for three months. He then decided to focus on fashion design, and in 1956, joined Christian Dior as an assistant designer alongside Yves Saint Laurent. Following Dior's death in 1957, Scherrer worked under Saint Laurent, and then for Louis Féraud, before launching his own fashion house in 1962 on the Rue du Faubourg Saint-Honoré with the backing of Jacques Chabrol, a French millionaire.

In the mid-1960s Scherrer had an agreement with the American department store Bergdorf Goodman to grant them exclusive rights to reproduce and resell his designs in the States. His clients included Anne-Aymone Giscard d'Estaing, Jacqueline Kennedy Onassis, and Raquel Welch, who wore Scherrer animal-print dresses in the 1977 film L'Animal. By the 1980s, his work was known for its opulence and luxury, with many garments hand-beaded, embroidered and lavishly trimmed. His extremely expensive designs were popular with the wealthy wives of Middle East oil tycoons, but after the Gulf War broke out, they stopped purchasing his clothes.

== Dismissal ==
In 1990 Scherrer was fired without warning by his then business partners, Hermès and Ilona Gestion, who held a 90% controlling stake in the business. Although the sacking was publicly criticised by high-profile figures in the French fashion industry including Marc Bohan, and Saint Laurent's co-founder Pierre Bergé, there was little that could be done. The fashion historian Colin McDowell described it as "a salutary warning of the dangers of putting too many eggs in one basket, of not keeping control of one's business and, according to some, of designer hubris". Scherrer himself described the method of his sacking as "Comme on aurait renvoyé la bonne" ("as you would dismiss the maid").

Erik Mortensen replaced Scherrer at Jean-Louis Scherrer, and from 1997 to 2007 Stéphane Rolland was designer for the fashion house before it closed permanently in 2008. The brand, which as of 2013, specialises in licensed products, is currently owned by the Dumesnil Group.

== Death ==
On 20 June 2013, Scherrer died in a palliative care clinic in Paris following a 10 month illness. He was survived by his daughters and by his ex-wife Laurence, Laetitia (a former model) and Leonor Scherrer, also a fashion designer specialising in mourning dress.
