= Stéphane Rolland =

French fashion designer

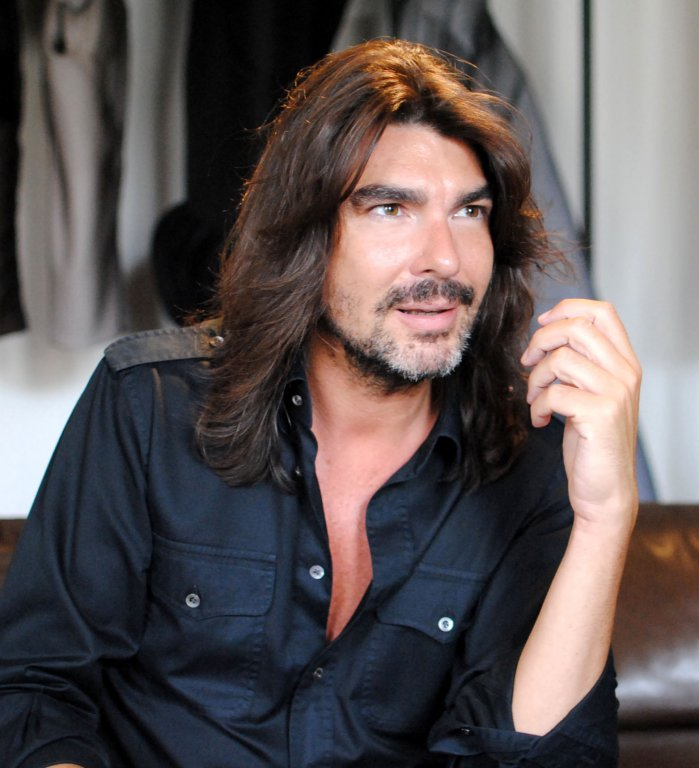
- Stéphane Rolland in his atelier at Avenue George V in Paris
- Education: École de la Chambre Syndicale de la haute couture
- Label: Stephane Rolland

Stéphane Rolland (pronounced [stefan ʁɔlɑ̃]) is a French fashion designer and an haute couture fashion brand. His mother worked at Pictorial Service, one of the most famous Parisian photographic studios, and he grew up surrounded by black-and-white photographs. "Everything was black-and-white; everything was about volume and contrast. My eyes were trained early on with these concepts and everything I do is about contrast, volume and movement. It’s in my DNA".

== Fashion career ==
At the age of 20 Rolland joined Balenciaga and within a year was promoted to the position of Creative Director of menswear and international licenses. At 24, he left Balenciaga to start his own prêt-à-porter company, which he ran for six years, until he was asked to become artistic designer for the haute couture fashion house formerly owned by Jean-Louis Scherrer, a position he occupied for the next ten years.

Rolland simultaneously worked as a costume designer. In 2006 and 2007, he was nominated for the prestigious Molière awards and became an official partner of the Cannes Film Festival.

On 2 July 2007, Rolland presented a couture collection under his own name.

Rolland is a full member of the Chambre Syndicale de la Haute Couture and therefore his brand can officially bear the "Haute Couture" label. In May 2013, Rolland opened his first boutique in the Etihad Towers, Abu Dhabi.
