= Cathy Pill =

Belgian fashion designer

- Born: 1981 (age 44–45); Antwerp
- Education: graduate of the fashion school E.N.S.A.V. of La Cambre in Brussels

Cathy Pill is a Belgian fashion designer, formerly creator and director of Cathy Pill label, and presently co-founder and chief executive officer of MuseStyle.

Pill started her career at A.F. Vandevorst and Vivienne Westwood. The Cathy Pill label was invited to show during Paris Fashion Weeks for 7 years,. The brand was featured in more than 70 stockists (Galleries Lafayette, Browns, Harvey Nichols, Liberty, Stijl, Irina Kha and was worn by a number of celebrities (Lou Doillon, Beth Ditto, Eva Green). Pill has worked as a consultant for Fashion houses NATAN and as a guest designer for French catalogue retailer La Redoute's with Lou Doillon as her egerie.

== Early life ==
Born in Antwerp in 1981, Cathy Pill graduated from the fashion school E.N.S.A.V. of La Cambre in Brussels. She interned at brands such as A.F. Vandevorst and Vivienne Westwood before winning a numerous prizes.

== Career ==
Pill launched her first ready-to-wear collection, titled "Blink", during the Spring/Summer 06 Paris Fashion Week. Exposed at Le Louvre, and marrying Art Nouveau influenced sinuous patterns extraordinarily with draped and bunched silhouettes, the collection immediately evoked interest and attracted the international press, under which The Herald Tribune, Le Monde, Vogue or Style.com.

The following November, Pill was invited to present her collections during the Paris fashion weeks for 7 consecutive years. After only a few collections, Cathy Pill's label could be found in more than 15 countries and 70 stockists Colette, Galleries Lafayette, Browns, Liberty.

Pill worked as a consultant for other fashion houses (ex. NATAN, Claudia Strater. In 2008 Pill was chosen by Canon Europe to design the famous CD-dress as well as for the We Speak Image collection alongside Matthew Williamson and Jean Charles de Castelbajac.

During the Spring-Summer 2009 season, a line of printed leather bags was launched along with her collection, in collaboration with Kipling. In 2011, La Redoute invited Pill as their Guest Designer for the spring-summer 2011 edition with Lou Doillon as her egerie.

Founded by Cathy Pill, Musestyle.com is a fashion visual curation platform launched in December 2013.
