= Mohammed Ashi =

Saudi Arabian fashion designer

- Born: Saudi Arabia
- Occupation: Fashion designer
- Years active: 2007–present
- Known for: Founder of Ashi Studio
- Website: ashistudio.com

Mohammed Ashi is a Saudi Arabian fashion designer and the founder of Ashi Studio, a fashion house recognized for its haute couture designs. Ashi gained notability for his architectural approach to fashion and craftsmanship.

== Early life and education ==
Ashi was born in Saudi Arabia. Ashi graduated from Esmod International Fashion University in Paris in 2004.

Before founding his own label, Ashi trained in the United States and worked for Givenchy and the Lebanese couturier Elie Saab.

== Career ==
In 2007, Ashi founded Ashi Studio, a couture house based in Beirut, Lebanon. The label gained attention for its sculptural silhouettes and minimalist aesthetic, combining contemporary design with traditional craftsmanship.

Ashi relocated the label's atelier to Paris in 2018. He was later appointed a mentor to Saudi Arabia's Fashion Commission, the government body established in 2020 to develop the country's fashion industry.

In 2023, Ashi became the first designer from the Gulf region to be invited to show at Paris Haute Couture Week under the official calendar of the French Haute Couture Federation. His designs have been worn by Beyoncé, Lady Gaga, and Queen Rania of Jordan.

In 2024, Forbes included Ashi in their list of "fashion innovators."

== Clientele ==
Ashi's designs have appeared on red carpets at events including the Oscars and the Cannes Film Festival. Those who have worn his work include Beyoncé, Deepika Padukone, Zendaya, and Cardi B. Beyoncé wore one of his gowns at a memorial event for Nelson Mandela. In 2017, the director Ava DuVernay wore an Ashi design at the Academy Awards.
