= Germaine Lecomte =

French fashion designer (1889 - 1966)

Germaine Lecomte (28 August 1889, Bressuire, Deux-Sèvres, France – 1 October 1966, Paris) was a French fashion designer. She founded her house in 1920 on Paris's Royale Street, and later moved to Avenue Matignon.

== Career ==
She provided costumes for a number of movies including Obsession, The Scheming Women, Napoleon Road, The Millionaire Tramp, The Gay Adventure, Memorable Eyes, By the Window, A Ghost, Jean of the Moon, and L’Arpete. Perfumes launched by Germaine Lecomte included Love Witch and Party Night. Maurice Chevalier sang a commercial about Party Night.

Germaine Lecomte was a friend of artists such as Maurice de Vlaminck and Renee Durey. Her clients included actresses such as Michèle Morgan, Patricia Mars and Micheline Francey and her dresses were worn at the Cannes Festival.

In 1939, she was invited to the New York World's Fair. Some of her dresses are in museums such as the Musée Galliera in Paris and the Metropolitan Museum in New York. In 1945, she was invited to participate to the Théâtre de la Mode.
