= Ronald van der Kemp =

Dutch fashion designer

Ronald van der Kemp (born 24 September 1964 in Wijchen, Netherlands) is a Dutch fashion designer and founder of demi-couture fashion house RVDK Ronald van der Kemp, his namesake label.

== Early career ==
Van der Kemp graduated from the Gerrit Rietveld Academy of Art and Design in Amsterdam in 1989 with a BA in fashion design. His early career took him to major fashion cities Paris, Milan and New York, working as creative director, consultant and chief designer for brands including Bill Blass, Barneys New York and Guy Laroche, where he succeeded Elbar Albaz. He also worked at Celine. It was in these years as a consultant that van der Kemp honed his technical expertise.

== Own label ==
In August 2014 van der Kemp launched his demi-couture label, RVDK Ronald van der Kemp, presenting his first ‘wardrobe’ during the Paris haute couture calendar in 2015. Shunning the fashion system’s way of doing things, van der Kemp’s proposed ‘wardrobe’ consisted of a selection of limited-edition items that were seasonless and timeless, ethically made with existing fabrics, and crafted by hand in small ateliers in Amsterdam.

In a 2021 interview, van der Kemp affirmed that "95 % of the material used for his designs already exists" and described his brand as more of "a movement" than a traditional couture house.

Net-a-Porter, the luxury ecommerce group, was the first retailer to buy van der Kemp’s demi-couture collection, which has since been worn by celebrities including Selena Gomez, Kate Moss, Lady Gaga, Katy Perry, Dakota Johnson, Adriana Lima, Céline Dion and Karlie Kloss.
