= Philippe et Gaston =

Paris couture house established in 1922

Philippe et Gaston was a Paris couture house established in 1922. It rapidly became a prestigious establishment. In 1926 it was ranked alongside Chanel, Madeleine Vionnet and Jeanne Lanvin as a notable French fashion house. By 1931, it was well known enough to rate a mention in Bruno Jasieński's 1931 play The Ball of the Mannequins. However, by 1946, the house was in need of resurrection. That year, the French textile baron, entrepreneur, and one of France's richest men, Marcel Boussac invited Christian Dior to become head designer for Philippe et Gaston and rejuvenate the brand. Dior declined, as he wanted to launch his own label under his own terms, rather than resurrect an "old-fashioned and rundown house." Boussac and Dior subsequently launched Christian Dior S. A.

Two 1920s garments by the House, an evening gown and a fur-trimmed coat, are in the Costume Institute at the Metropolitan Museum of Art.
