= Alexis Mabille =

French fashion designer (born 1977)

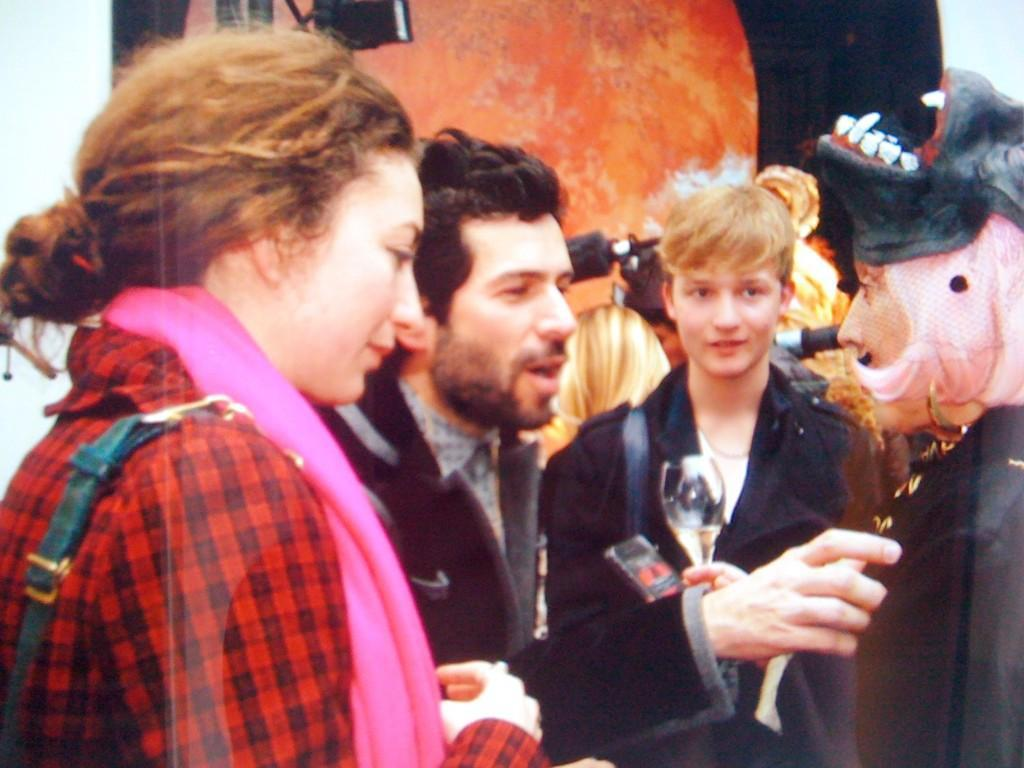
- Born: 30 November 1977 (age 48); Lyon, France
- Education: Chambre Syndicale de la Couture Parisienne
- Label: Alexis Mabille

Alexis Mabille (born 30 November 1977) is a French fashion designer who is the creative director of his namesake label, Alexis Mabille.

== Early life ==
Alexis Mabille was born on 30 November to a middle-class family in Lyon, France. His mother had an interest in fashion, and taught the young Mabille how to use a needle and thread. He developed an expertise in creating clothes, and as a teen would dress his family and friends. He designed clothes for the Lyon opera, and made clothes for a growing number of clients.

== Education ==
In 1995, Mabille enrolled in the Chambre Syndicale de la Couture Parisienne for a three-year course. In 1997, he graduated early due to his early expertise at couture designs. He would then train at Ungaro and Nina Ricci.

== Career ==
After his training at Nina Ricci and Ungaro, Mabille moved to Dior where then-creative director John Galliano noticed his talent and appointed him to design the 1997 accessories collection for the house. It was a major success, and he collaborated on the men's jewelry collection with Hedi Slimane, who would later go on to head Dior Homme. He would continue his service at Dior while collaborating with such celebrated fashion houses as Yves Saint Laurent and Lancôme.

In 2005, he launched his namesake label, his designs at that time were unisex. He decided to use the bowtie as a logo, as well as a common denominator of menswear and womenswear. He wanted to reinvent the bowties that were seen in France as old-fashioned, and only won by the girls in the countryside. His collections for Ready to Wear were lauded across the fashion world, with such people as Karl Lagerfeld and Mick Jagger praising his bowtie collections. In 2008, Alexis Mabille showed at Paris Haute Couture Fashion Week for the first time.

== Personal life ==
Mabille currently lives in Marais, Paris, France.
