= Mad Carpentier =

French fashion design house

Mad Carpentier was a French fashion design house, created in January 1940 in Paris by Mad Maltezos and Suzie Carpentier. It was created after Madeleine Vionnet, their former employer, closed in 1939. They stayed open during World War II, and were very popular in the 1940s. With an unusual name, newspaper reports of the era sometimes referred to Mad Carpentier as if it was a single person.

In fashion history and for many clients, Mad Carpentier represented a continuation of Vionnet's bias cut and elegance. In the late 1940s, Mad Carpentier was celebrated for the evening dresses and its remarkable and popular coats in 1940s and 1950s, breaking with the Vionnet tradition. The partnership ended in late 1957, when Mad Maltezos left to join Patou.

== Bibliography ==
- Perkins, Alice K. Paris Couturiers and Milliners. New York: Fairchild Publications, 1949
- Picken, Mary Brooks, and Dora Loues Miller, Dressmakers of France: The Who, How and Why of the French Couture, New York, 1956
