= Maggy Rouff =

French fashion designer (1896 - 1971)

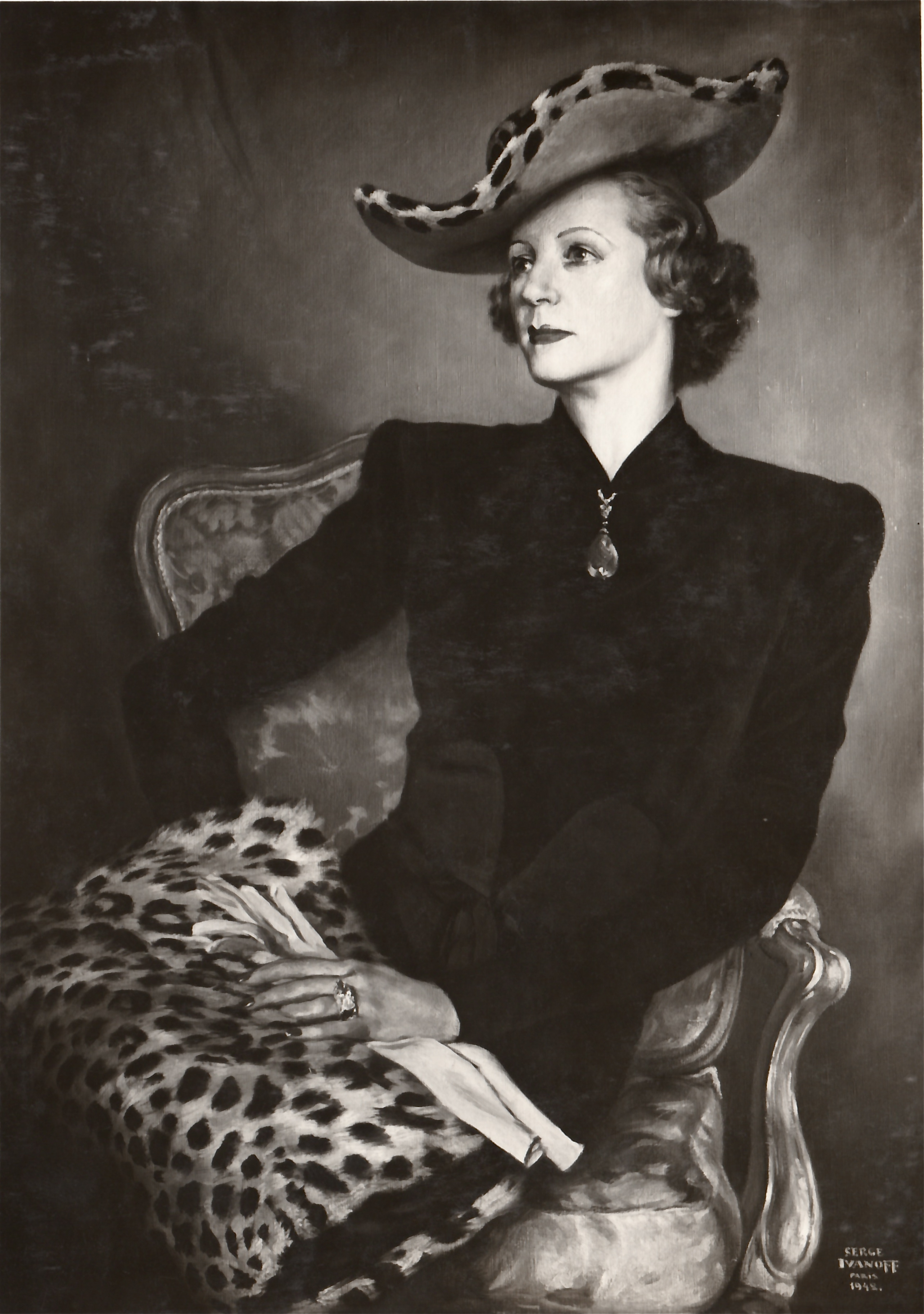
Portrait de Maggy Rouff Par Serge Ivanoff, Paris, 1948.

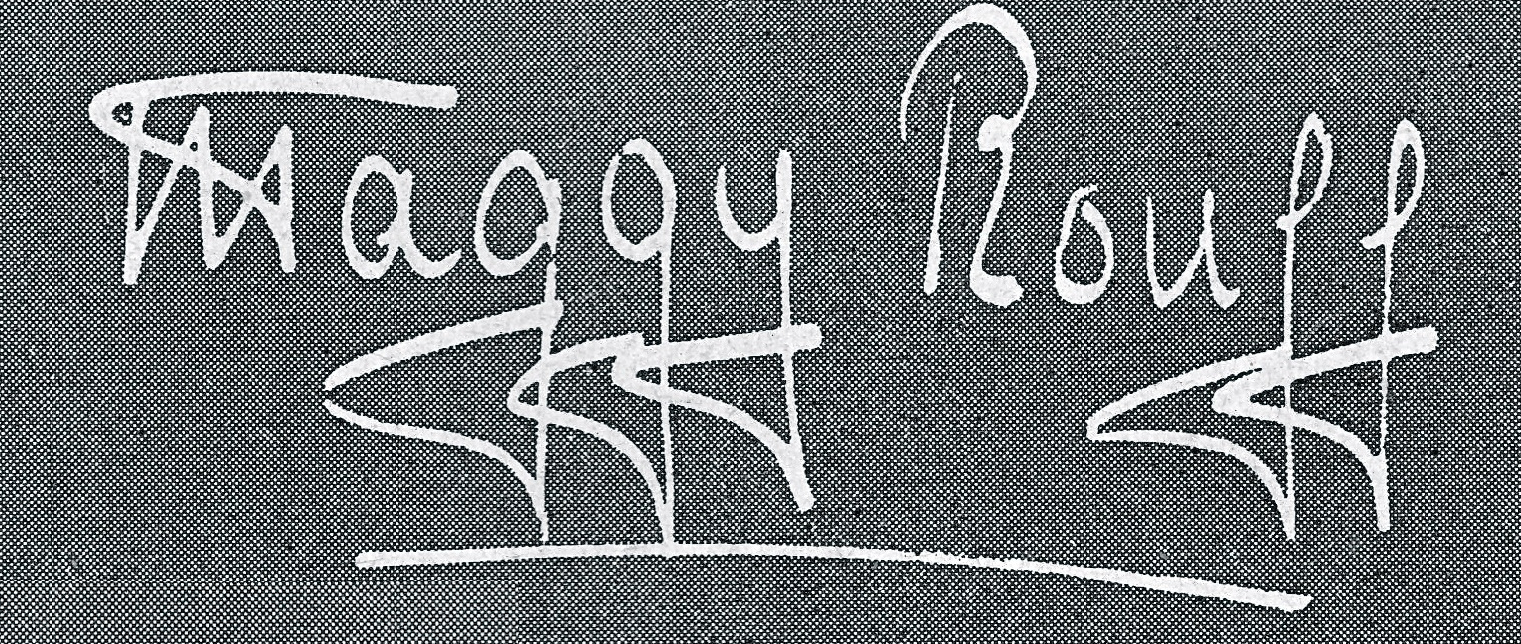
Signature of Maggy Rouff, cut from 1946 publicity for the textiles of Robert Perrier.

Maggy Rouff (September 1, 1896 – August 7, 1971) was a French fashion designer of Belgian origin.

== Family and early life ==
Maggy Rouff was born Marguerite de Wagner in 1896, to a Belgian couple (though Madame de Wagner was German-born). In 1902, Rouff's parents opened a couture house in Paris under the name Drecoll. This was a branch of the well-known Viennese fashion house Drécoll. Founded in 1896 by Christoff von Drécoll, the fashion house was a favorite of the Austro-Hungarian imperial family. Monsieur and Madame de Wagner paid for the right to use the Drécoll name in Paris while designing their own fashions.

== Career ==
Marguerite (Maggy) de Wagner married Pierre Besançon in October 1917 in Paris and both subsequently adopted the name Besançon de Wagner. In 1929, Marguerite Besançon de Wagner opened a new fashion house at 136 avenue des Champs Elysees under the name Maggy Rouff.

Rouff was known for her understated sportswear designs at the beginning of her career, and later for the feminine detailing in her garments such as ruffles, shirring, and the bias cut.

In 1937, Rouff opened a London outpost at 12a Stanhope Gate, Park Lane. The business was housed in an old home which Rouff decorated herself.

In the 1930s, Rouff headed PAIS (Association pour la Protection des Arts Plastiques et Appliques, also known as the Association pour la Protection des Industries Artistiques Saisonnieres), one of the most important anti-piracy and counterfeiting trade networks in Paris couture, which was founded by Madeleine Vionnet in 1922.

== Famous clients ==
Maggy Rouff is listed as costume designer or as part of the costue department for twelve films between 1938 and 1961. The latter films may have been designed by Anne-Marie Besançon de Wagner using the Maggy Rouff label.

In 1938, the "children of France" gifted Princess Elizabeth and Princess Margaret two dresses and a set of handkerchiefs. Other well-known clients included Grace Kelly and Clarissa Churchill Eden.

== Writings ==
Rouff wrote two books, American Seen Through the Microscope, about her travels in the United States, and Philosophy of Elegance.

== Later life ==
Rouff retired in 1948. Her daughter Anne-Marie Besançon de Wagner took over the business. The house closed in 1965 after failing to attract younger customers.
