= Paris Fashion Week =

Fashion industry event in Paris, France

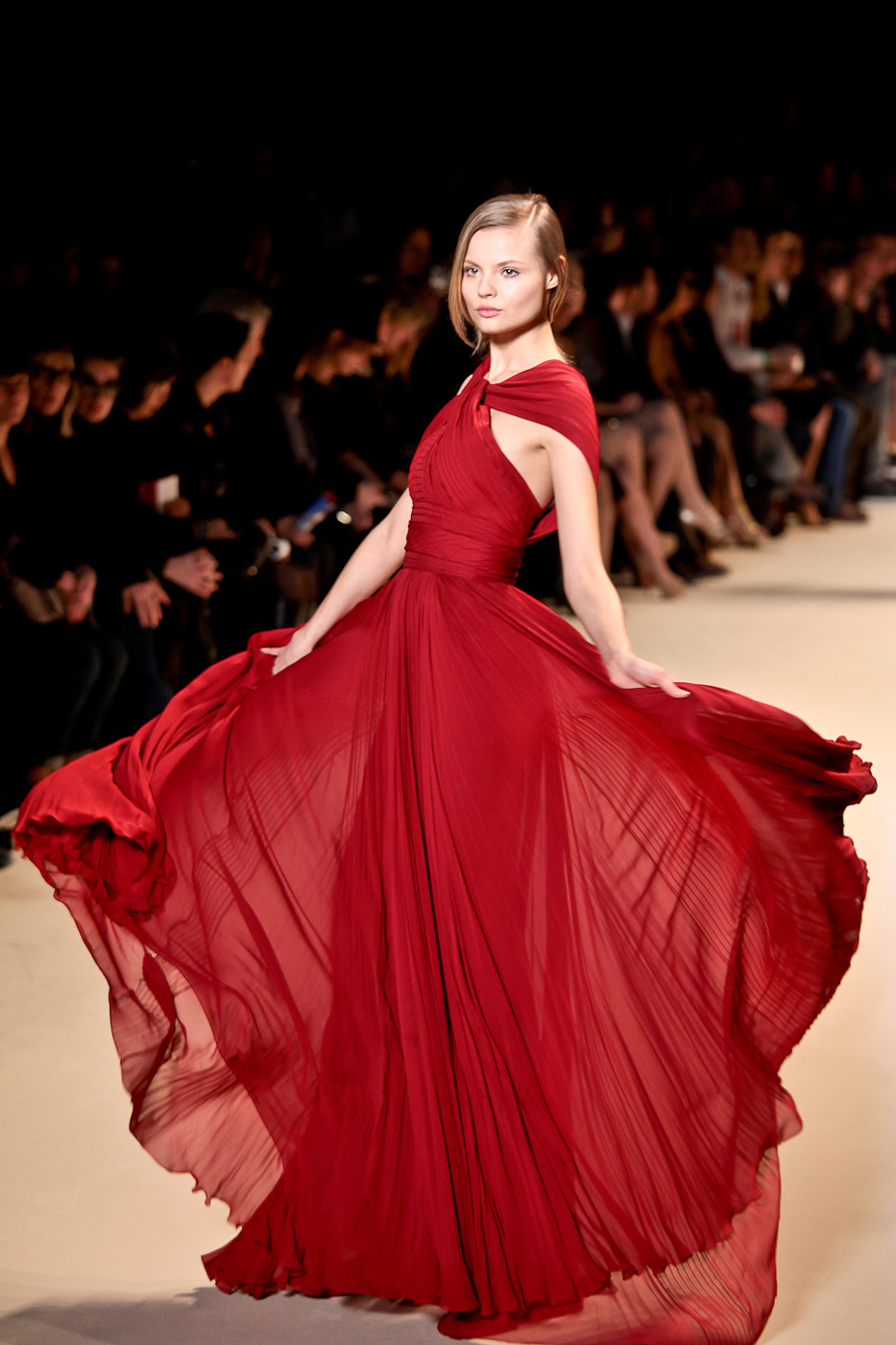
- Magdalena Frackowiak in Elie Saab at Paris Fashion Week F/W 2011
- Genre: Clothing and fashion exhibitions
- Dates: Spring and fall
- Frequency: Semi annual
- Locations: Paris, France
- Inaugurated: October 1–9, 1973
- Organiser: Fédération de la Haute Couture et de la Mode
- Website: Official website

Paris Fashion Week (French: Semaine de la mode de Paris, commonly [la] Fashion Week) is a series of designer presentations held semi-annually in Paris, France, with spring/summer and autumn/winter events held each year. Dates are determined by the Fédération de la Haute Couture et de la Mode. Paris Fashion Week is held at venues throughout the city. It is one of the "Big Four" fashion weeks alongside New York, Milan, and London.

In addition to ready-to-wear shows, there are men's and haute couture shows; these are held semiannually for the spring/summer and autumn/winter seasons. The haute couture collections are always presented and exhibited before the ready-to-wear collections, with there being a total of a little over 100 collections each season. Also, every year, famous brands like Dior, Chanel, Louis Vuitton, Kenzo, Givenchy, and Céline host their shows in historical places such as the Carrousel du Louvre and the Grand Palais.

== Paris Fashion Week criteria ==
In order to participate, the houses must fulfill the criteria that are set in place by the Chambre Syndicale de la Haute Couture, such as a requirement of 35 looks per year that need to include day and evening wear. Only a few houses are able to fulfill this requirement; therefore, this leaves few to participate in haute couture fashion shows. Since there are only a few spots left for those to participate, there are the well-known high-end fashion brands like Chanel and Alexander Mcqueen, but also the lesser-known ones like Maxime Simöens and Eymele Burgaud.

== The Big 4 ==
Paris Fashion Week is part of the global "Big 4" fashion weeks, the others being London Fashion Week, Milan Fashion Week and New York Fashion Week. The schedule begins with New York, followed by London, and then Milan and ends in Paris. New York was the first city to hold a "fashion week".

== Origins ==
Although the first fashion week was held in New York, the event itself derives from "salon shows" ("défilés de mode" in French, literally "fashion parades") in Paris couture salons.

A fashion week consists of a week of organized events of multiple designers' collections. Before this organized event was recognized in New York City, fashion showings were being held in Paris as early as the 1700s. Some earlier showings were presented on mannequins, which made it difficult for clients to see fashion pieces fully since the mannequin didn't have the same mobility a model did. These early showings were only to clients purchasing items and were shown on mannequins. In the 1800s, showings began to change. Charles Frederick Worth, noted for haute couture, began showing multiple pieces together and of a higher design. These designs were showcased to get the customer's attention in buying the pieces. Jeanne Paquin is the first designer to make her showings public and Paul Poiret is the first to host parties after his events.

In the mid 1800s, Mme Pauline von Metternich, an Austrian Princess and wife to the Ambassador of Paris, saw one of Worth's sketches and employed him to make her a gown. He gained much recognition through his powerful clients and opened his own haute couture house in Paris in 1858, which sold luxury fashion to upper-class women.

== Chambre Syndicale de la Haute Couture ==
In 1868 the Chambre Syndicale de la Haute Couture was created to set the specifications to determine what constituted a 'couture house'. The group decided that to be defined a piece of haute couture the clothing must have been; custom-made to fit the wearer, hand-sewn by multiple skilled artisans in the separate fields of embroidery, stitching, and beading, and only the most high quality of materials may be used.

== L’Association de Protection des Industries Artistiques Saisonnières ==
In 1921, fifty-three years after the Chambre Syndicale de la Haute Couture was created, the French press created L’Association de Protection des Industries Artistiques Saisonnieres, or PAIS to protect couture designs from being copied. To ensure the copyright of the designers, their creations were photographed on a model or mannequin from the front, back, and sides to catalog the design.

== The first Paris Fashion Week ==
In 1945, the Chambre Syndicale de la Haute Couture established another set of rules to regulate and determine Haute Couture houses. In order to meet the criteria, the house had to ensure they followed the updated rules with one of them being that in each season, a couture house must present a collection of at least 35 runs with both daytime and evening wear to the Paris press. Others included having at least 20 members on staff, and that every design must include fittings and be made-to-order for the clientele. The following biannual events of Haute Couture houses in accordance with the new guidelines set by the Chambre Syndicale de la Haute Couture have been seen as the first pair of fashion weeks in Paris.

== First fashion week under the Fédération Française de la Couture ==
The first recognized Paris Fashion Week was held in October 1973 and organized Haute Couture, Ready-to-Wear, and Men's Fashion into one grouped showing by the Fédération Française de la Couture.

The event was a fundraiser held at the Palace of Versailles to restore the palace. The amount aimed to reach to repair the palace was estimated at US$60 million which converts to 53,026,956 Euros. The fundraiser was started because the French government had stated they could not handle the cost of the renovations. It was overseen by the founder of New York Press Week, now known as New York Fashion Week, Eleanor Lambert, in accordance with, the at the time Versailles curator, Gérald Van der Kemp. The restorations and renovations included Marie Antoinette's dressing room, Louis XV's children's play room, and a staircase which began construction in 1722 but was never finished.

Both American and Parisian designers attended the event including; Anne Klein, Bill Blass, Stephen Burrows, Oscar de la Renta, Hubert de Givenchy, and Yves Saint Laurent. The French designers each held their own showing set to various themes whose pieces included; a rocket ship, pumpkin coach and a rhinoceros pulling a gypsy caravan.

The American designers, due to errors in measurement conversion, collectively held one showing under the common theme of Paris using both white and African-American models. The American designers' use of diversity in models marked the event as the first time African-American models had walked a French runway.

The event gained much publicity because of the designers involved and is given the nickname "The Battle of Versailles" because of its location and the tension between the American and Parisian designers during the run of the show.

== Rules of Paris Fashion Show ==
=== Size-zero ban ===
According to French law Fashion Week does not allow size zero models to attend. The purpose of this ban is to deter models from trying to attain an unhealthy beauty standard and in turn promoting it to the public. Nutritionist and dietetics warn individuals about this dangerous fashion trend as it creates a higher increase of eating disorders in younger individuals, ranging from 14-18 years old. However, the term "size-zero" was not created by Fashion Week, but those in the Hollywood film industry in the 1990s. Most seeking to get into the fashion world confuse the size 0 law as a law that does not allow models in a size 0 to walk in shows.

=== Age limits ===
Paris Fashion Week prohibits models under 18 years of age. After steps taken by luxury brands like LVMH and Kering, it is stated that "No model under 16 years will be recruited to take part in fashion shows or photographic sessions representing adults."

== See also ==
- Fashion week
- List of fashion events
