= Fédération de la Haute Couture et de la Mode =

Governing body for the French fashion industry

The Fédération de la Haute Couture et de la Mode (French pronunciation: [fedeʁɑsjɔ̃ d(ə) la ot kutyʁ e d(ə) la mɔd]; 'Federation of Haute Couture and Fashion') is the governing body for the French fashion industry. It has a dual mission: as a professional organisation in the classic sense of the term, as in other sectors of the economy. As such, it provides services to its members, and represents them in the professional ecosystem and towards public authorities in France and Europe. As an event organisation with Paris Fashion Week and Haute Couture Week, for which it structures the official calendars and adjacent activities, it aims to consolidate Paris as the fashion capital of the world.

== History ==
1868: Creation of the Chambre Syndicale de la Couture, des Confectionneurs et des Tailleurs pour Dames et Fillettes, on the initiative of Charles Frederick Worth.

1911: The organisation is renamed Chambre Syndicale de la Couture Parisienne.

1945: The controlled appellation "Haute Couture" is created. The organisation becomes the Chambre Syndicale de la Haute Couture.

1973: Creation of the Chambre Syndicale du Prêt-à-Porter des Couturiers et des Créateurs de Mode and the Chambre Syndicale de la Mode Masculine. Creation on the same day of the Fédération Française de la Couture, du Prêt-à-Porter des Couturiers et des Créateurs de Mode.

2017: Becomes the Fédération de la Haute Couture et de la Mode.

2024: Institutional reform of the Fédération de la Haute Couture et de la Mode.

== Chambres syndicales and other entities ==
The federation comprises three chambres syndicales ('trade associations'):

- Chambre Syndicale de la Haute Couture
- Chambre Syndicale de la Mode Féminine
- Chambre Syndicale de la Mode Masculine

The federation also has a fashion school, the École de la chambre syndicale de la couture parisienne (created in 1927 and still active). Alumni of the school include Valentino Garavani, Yves Saint Laurent, Karl Lagerfeld, André Courreges, Issey Miyake, Anne Valerie Hash, Alexis Mabille, Tomas Maier, Nicole Miller, Stephane Rolland, Victor Joris.

The federation has close ties to the Union Nationale Artisanale de la Couture et des Activités Connexes ('National Couture Craft Industry and Related Activities Union'), a trade association of couture dressmakers in other French administrative regions outside of Paris.

== Functions ==
The federation is responsible for setting the dates and location of the French fashion weeks. It also establishes industry standards on quality and on the use of the word "haute couture".

== See also ==
- French fashion
- Haute couture
- List of fashion designers
- List of grand couturiers
- Arab Fashion Council
- Association Nationale pour le Développement des Arts de la Mode
- British Fashion Council
- Council of Fashion Designers of America
- National Chamber of Italian Fashion
