= Patricia Urquiola =

Spanish architect and designer (born 1961)

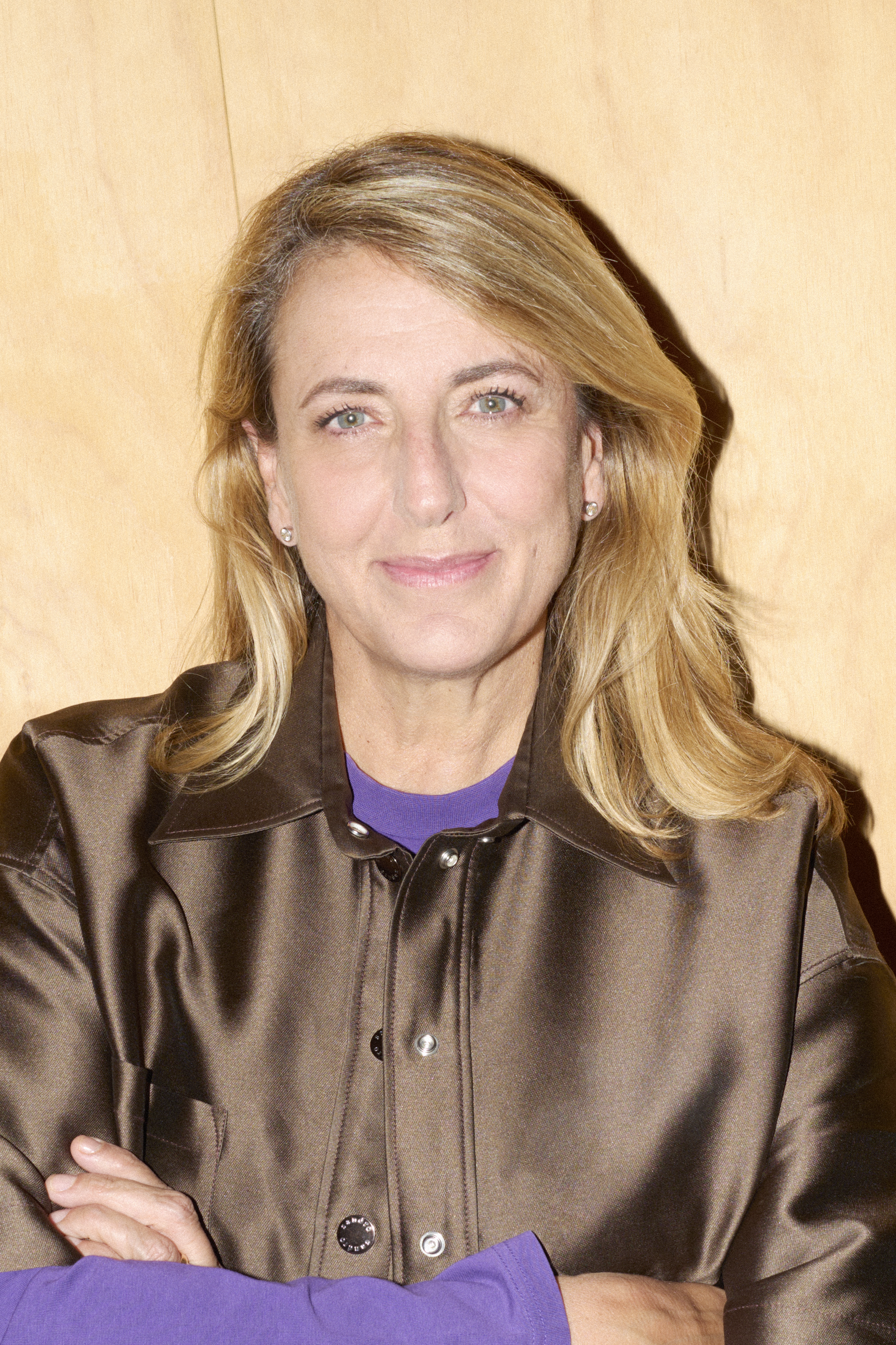
- Born: 22 April 1961 (age 65)
- Education: Polytechnic University of Milan
- Occupations: Architect, artist, designer
- Awards: Gold Medal of Merit in the Fine Arts (2011); Order of Isabella the Catholic (2011); Dearest Son of Oviedo (2010)
- Website: patriciaurquiola.com

Patricia Urquiola Hidalgo (born 1961) is a Spanish architect, industrial designer and art director. Her work is featured in the MoMA in New York, Musée des Arts Décoratifs in Paris, Triennale di Milano, Design Museum in Munich, National Gallery of Victoria in Melbourne, Vitra Design Museum in Basel, Victoria & Albert Museum in London, Design Museum in Zurich, Stedelijk Museum of Modern and Contemporary Art in Amsterdam, Design Museum in Barcelona, and the Philadelphia Museum of Art. Since 2015, she has been the Art Director of Cassina.

== Biography ==
Patricia Urquiola was born in Oviedo, Spain, and studied architecture at the Universidad Politécnica de Madrid. She later moved to Milan to complete her studies at the Politecnico di Milano, graduating in 1989 under the mentorship of Achille Castiglioni. She worked with Vico Magistretti and later served as Head of Design at Lissoni Associati.

In 2001, she opened a studio in Milan.

Her architectural projects include Casa Brera, Six Senses Rome, the Mandarin Oriental Hotel in Barcelona, Das Stue Hotel in Berlin, the spa at the Four Seasons Hotel in Milan, and Il Sereno Hotel on Lake Como. She has also designed showrooms and installations for Cassina, the Venice Biennale, BMW, Missoni, Moroso, Ferrari, Swarovski, and Santoni.

She has delivered lectures at universities and cultural events: Bocconi University, Domus Academy, Harvard University, and Politecnico di Milano, where she serves on the advisory board, and Design Shanghai, Istanbul Design Week, the Expressive Design Conference at the Vitra Design Museum, the Bloomberg Design Conference in San Francisco, Festarch Perugia, Festival della Mente in Sarzana, and Festivaletteratura. She is also a member of the Scientific Committee of the Fondazione Museo del Design, the Board of Directors of the Triennale di Milano, and the advisory board of Altagamma, where she holds honorary membership. She was an Ambassador for Expo Milan 2015.

== Reception ==
In 2011 she was awarded the Medalla de Oro al Mérito en las Bellas Artes and the Order of Isabella the Catholic by King Juan Carlos I of Spain.

The New York Times has described her as: "possibly the most lauded and in-demand industrial designer in Europe, on par with Philippe Starck and Hella Jongerius".

In 2023, she was named the Interior designer of the year at Dezeen Awards, and was appointed Honorary Ambassador of Marca España. In 2024, she became a member of the Real Academia de Bellas Artes de San Fernando and was awarded the title of Knight of the Order of Merit of the Italian Republic by the President of Italy.

In October 2024, she and Teresa Sapey were the recipients of the inaugural Tempietto di Bramante Award; she was inducted into the Spanish Royal Academy of Fine Arts in the same month.

Wallpaper, Dezeen, Frame, Elle Decor International, AD España, and Architektur und Wohnen have selected her for their annual Designer of the Year or Lifetime Achievement Awards.

== Museum collections and exhibitions ==
Her work has been acquired for the permanent collections of the Museum of Modern Art in New York, Philadelphia Museum of Art, Vitra Design Museum, and Musée des Arts décoratifs in Paris. Her work has also been displayed in the following exhibitions:

- 2013 “O’clock – time design, design time”, CAFA Art Museum, Beijing, China.
- 2013 "Patricia Urquiola and Rosenthal, Landscape", Neues Museum, Nüremberg, Germany.
- 2017 "Patricia Urquiola: Between Craft and Industry", Philadelphia Museum of Art, Philadelphia, USA.

== Selected architecture projects ==
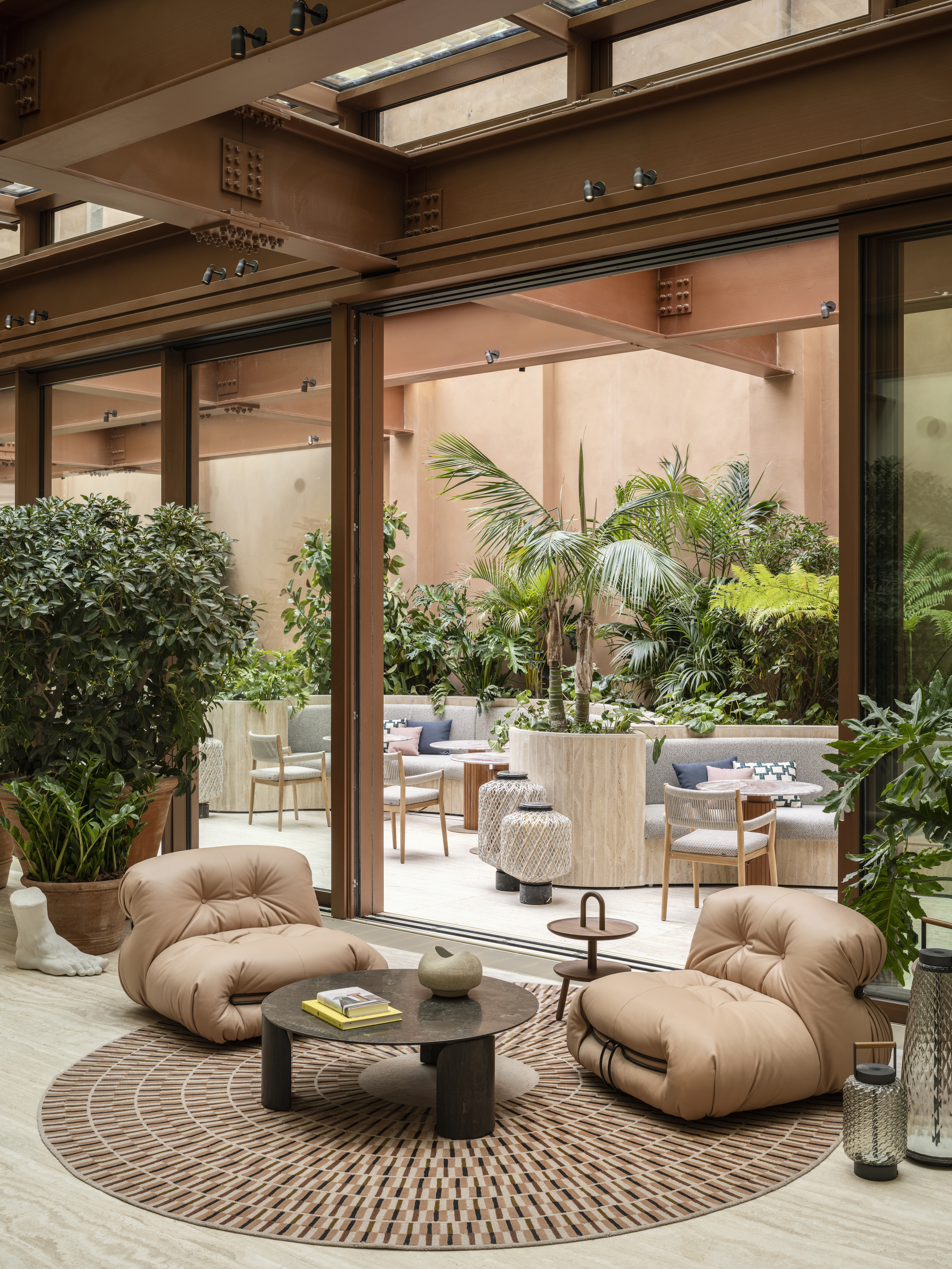
Six Senses Rome (2023)

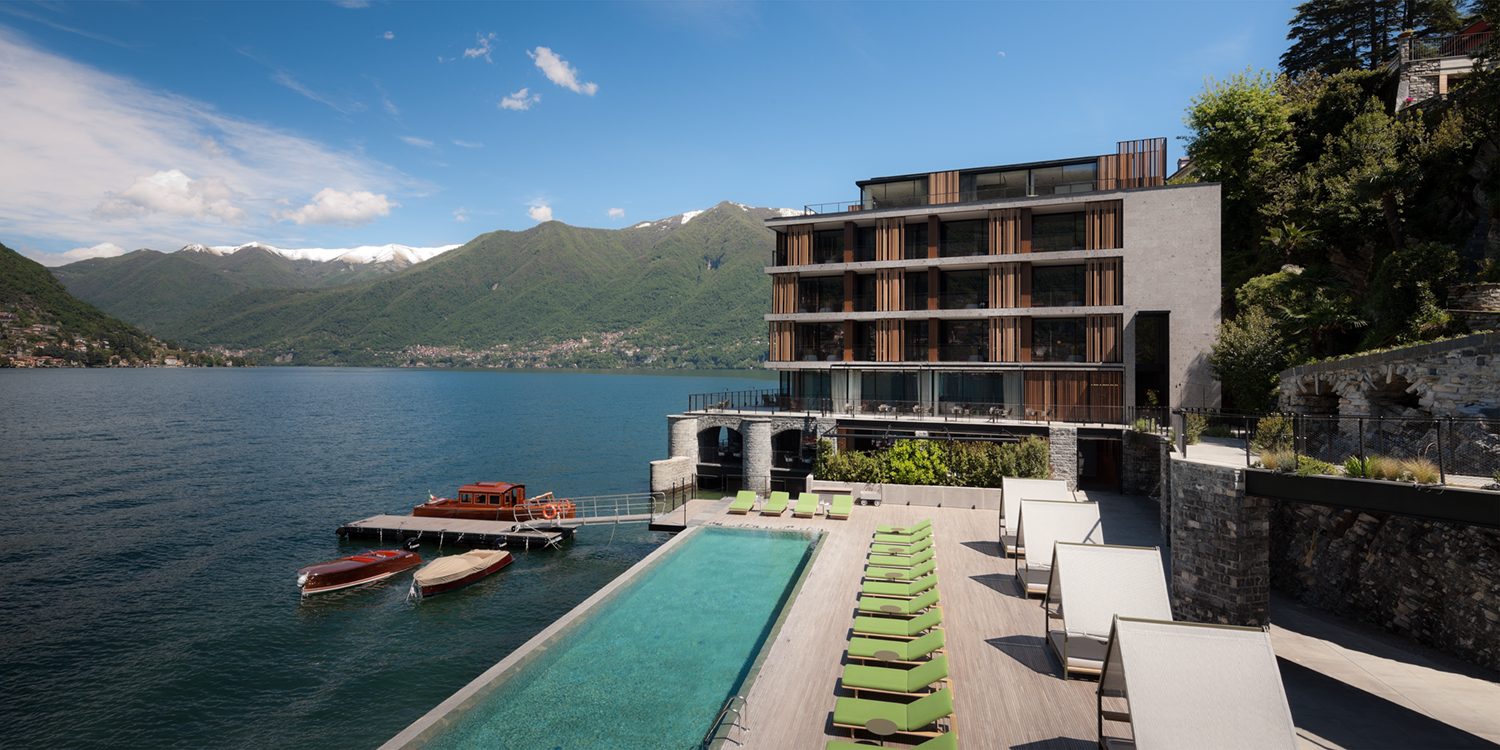
Il Sereno (2016–2021)

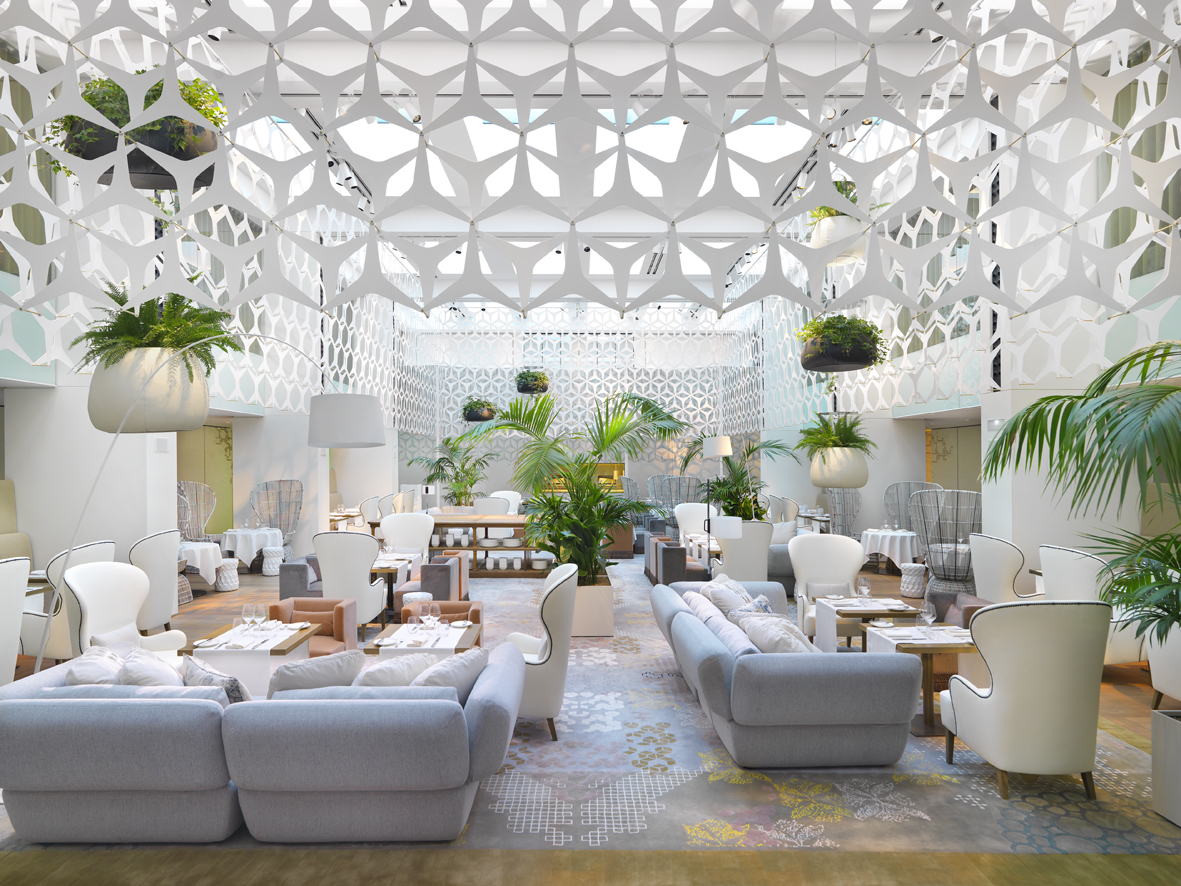
Mandarin Oriental Hotel (2010)

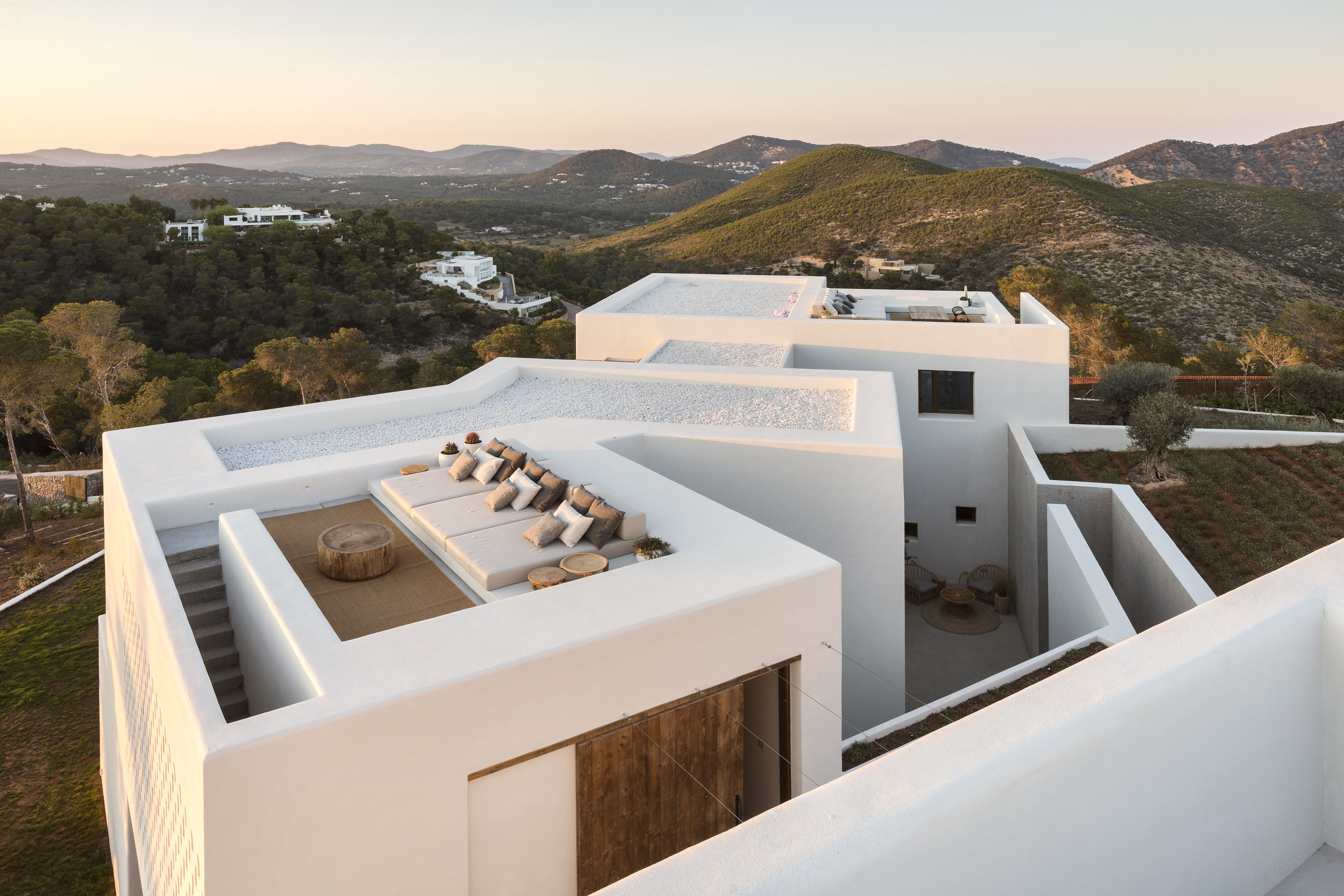
Private Villa, Ibiza (2018)

=== Hospitality ===
- 2025:
  - Jumeirah Capri Palace, 5 suites, Anacapri, Italy
  - IGNIV Restaurant, Andermatt, Switzerland
- 2024:
  - Casa Brera, Milan, Italy
  - The Emory Hotel, third and fourth floors, London, United Kingdom
- 2023:
  - Casa Perbellini 12 Apostoli, restaurant, Verona, Italy
  - Six Senses Rome, Rome, Italy
  - The Rome EDITION, Rome, Italy
- 2022:
  - Laguna Faro Suites, Grado, Italy
  - Raemian Gallery, Seoul, South Korea
- 2021:
  - Ca Di Dio, Venice, Italy
  - Four Seasons Hotel, Common Areas, Milan, Italy
  - Haworth Hotel, Holland, Michigan, USA
- 2020:
  - IGNIV, ristorante, Zurich, Switzerland
  - IGNIV, ristorante, Bangkok, Thailand
- 2019:
  - JW Marriott Hotel Lounge, Seoul, South Korea
- 2018:
  - Nika Private Residence, Velaa Private Island, Maldives
  - Eskalduna Eneko Restaurant, Bilbao, Spain
- 2017:
  - Il Sereno Spa, Como, Italy
  - 403030 Kitchen, Milan, Italy
- 2016:
  - Hotel Room Mate Giulia, Milan, Italy
  - Villa Pliniana, Como, Italy
  - Hotel Oasia, Singapore
  - Berton Al Lago Restaurant, Como, Italy
  - Igniv Restaurant, Badrutt's Palace, Saint Moritz, Switzerland
  - Igniv Restaurant, Grand Resort, Chef Andreas Caminada, Saint Moritz, Switzerland
- 2015:
  - Hotel Il Sereno, Como, Italy
  - Heart Disco Restaurant, Ibiza, Spain
- 2014:
  - Hotel Mandarin Oriental Extension, Barcelona, Spain
- 2012:
  - Hotel Das Stue, Berlin, Germany
  - Cinco Restaurant, Chef Paco Perez, Hotel Das Stue, Berlin, Germany
  - The Casual Restaurant, Hotel Das Stue, Berlin, Germany
  - Bar Stue, Hotel Das Stue, Berlin, Germany
- 2011:
  - Four Seasons Milano Spa, Milan, Italy
- 2010:
  - Hotel Mandarin Oriental, Barcelona, Spain
  - W Hotel, Vieques, Puerto Rico
  - Boujis Bar Promenade du Port, Porto Cervo, Italy
  - Bankers Bar, Mandarin Oriental, Barcelona, Spain
  - Moments Restaurant, Mandarin Oriental, Barcelona, Spain
  - Blanc Restaurant, Mandarin Oriental, Barcelona, Spain
  - Mimosa Garden, Mandarin Oriental, Barcelona, Spain
  - Terrat Restaurant, W Hotel, Vieques, Puerto Rico
  - Sorcé Restaurant, W Hotel, Vieques, Puerto Rico
  - Wet Bar, W Hotel, Vieques, Puerto Rico
  - W Café, W Hotel, Vieques, Puerto Rico
  - Doha Airport Bar and Museum Shop, Doha, Qatar

=== Installations ===
- 2025:
  - The Other Side Of The Hill, Biennale Architettura, Venice, Italy
  - Elle Decor Alchemica, Palazzo Bovara, Milan, Italy
  - Kettal Stand, Salone del Mobile, Milan, Italy
  - Among Us, Heimtextil, Messe Frankfurt, Germany
  - The Cassina Perspective, Cassina Durini, Salone del Mobile, Milan, Italy
  - Louis Vuitton Objets Nomades Installation, Louis Vuitton
- 2024:
  - El Paron, Interni Cross Vision, Università degli Studi di Milano, Milan, Italy
  - Cimento Stand, Salone del Mobile, Milan, Italy
  - Haworth Neocon, THE MART, Chicago, Illinois, USA
  - The Cassina Perspective, Cassina Durini, Salone del Mobile, Milan, Italy
  - Louis Vuitton Objets Nomades Installation, Louis Vuitton
- 2023:
  - Le Voyage Recommencé, Cartier Installation, Lucca, Italy
  - Haworth Neocon, THE MART, Chicago, Illinois, USA
  - Technogym Booth at ARCOmadrid, ARCO, Madrid, Spain
  - Echoes Cassina, 50 Years of iMaestri, Milan, Italy
  - The Cassina Perspective, Cassina Durini, Salone del Mobile, Milan, Italy
  - Louis Vuitton Objets Nomades Installation, Louis Vuitton
- 2022:
  - Il Galateo, 2022 Milan Design Week, Buccellati, Milan, Italy
  - Louis Vuitton Objets Nomades Installation, Place Vendôme, Doha, Qatar
  - Cimento Stand, Salone del Mobile 2022, Milan, Italy
  - Haworth Neocon 2022, THE MART, Chicago, Illinois, USA
  - The Cassina Perspective, Cassina Durini, Salone del Mobile, Milan, Italy
- 2021:
  - Louis Vuitton Objets Nomades Installation, Design Miami, Miami, USA
  - Sixième Sens Cartier Installation, Torno, Como, Italy
- 2019:
  - The Cassina Perspective, Cassina Durini, Salone del Mobile, Milan, Italy
  - Progressive Luxury Meets Creative Intelligence, BMW Welt, Munich, Germany
- 2018:
  - Life In Vogue, Salone del Mobile, Milan, Italy
  - Electa Bookstore, Milan, Italy
- 2017:
  - Cassina 9.0, Fondazione Feltrinelli, Milan, Italy
- 2015:
  - Signorina Misteriosa, Ferragamo, Milan, Italy
  - The Revolving Room, Salone del Mobile, Milan, Italy
- 2015:
  - L'Incoronazione di Poppea, Opera Scenography, Oviedo, Spain
  - The Dwelling Lab, BMW, Salone del Mobile, Milan, Italy

=== Exhibitions ===
- 2020:
  - Nature Morte Vivante, solo exhibition, Madrid Design Festival, Spain
- 2018:
  - A Castiglioni, Triennale di Milano, Milan, Italy
  - Don't Treat Me Like an Object, VR installation with Federico Pepe, Fuorisalone, Milan, Italy
- 2017:
  - Ferrari Under The Skin, The Design Museum, London, United Kingdom
  - Ferrari Under The Skin, Maranello, Italy
  - Patricia Urquiola: Between Craft and Industry, Philadelphia Museum of Art, Philadelphia, USA
- 2016:
  - Stanzas, Elle Decor Grand Hotel, Catanzaro, Italy
- 2011:
  - O'Clock - Time Design, Design Time, Triennale di Milano, Milan, Italy
  - Ossimoro, Casabella Lab, Milan, Italy
  - Not For All, Nilufar Gallery, Milan, Italy
- 2010:
  - Cosas, Feria Habitat Valencia, Spain
- 2008:
  - Nowhere-Now-Here, Contemporary Art Museum, Gijón, Spain
- 2006:
  - Pelle D'Asino, Abitare il Tempo, Verona, Italy

=== Naval ===
- 2022:
  - Sanlorenzo SD90 Yacht interior
  - Sanlorenzo SD118 Yacht interior
- 2019:
  - Yacht SD96, Sanlorenzo Yacht interior
- 2018:
  - Celebrity Cruises, Celebrity Edge
  - Tui Cruise, Mein Schiff

=== Residential ===
- 2024:
  - Private Apartment in Milan, Milan, Italy
- 2022:
  - Private Mountain House Bormio, Bormio, Italy
- 2020:
  - Lodha Residential, common areas, London, United Kingdom
- 2019:
  - Private House, Laglio, Como, Italy
  - Lodha Clubhouse, Mumbai, India
- 2018:
  - Private Villa, Ibiza, Spain
- 2016:
  - Private Villa, Melbourne, Australia
- 2010:
  - Private Villa, Udine, Italy
- 2009:
  - Apartment, Milan, Italy
- 2006:
  - Beach Villa, Punta del Este, Uruguay

=== Retail ===
- 2024:
  - Santoni – Boutique 2025, Milan, Italy
- 2024:
  - Andreu World Showroom, Dubai, United Arab Emirates
  - Andreu World Showroom, Tokyo, Japan
  - Andreu World Showroom, Milano, Italy
- 2023:
  - Ecoalf Shop, Milan, Italy
- 2022:
  - Fabiana Filippi Flagship Store, Milan, Italy
- 2018:
  - Missoni Boutique, Bangkok, Thailand
  - Missoni Boutique, New York, USA
  - Swarovski Crystal Studio, retail concept and store, Via Dante, Milan, Italy
- 2018:
  - Gianvito Rossi Boutique Donna, Rome, Italy
  - Missoni Boutique, Jakarta, Indonesia
  - Gianvito Rossi Corner, Nihonbashi, Japan
  - Missoni Shop, Daegu, South Korea
  - Gianvito Rossi Boutique, Monte Carlo
- 2017:
  - Panerai Boutique, London, UK
  - Gianvito Rossi Boutique Uomo, Milan, Italy
  - Gianvito Rossi Boutique Uomo, Paris, France
  - Missoni Boutique, Dubai, UAE
  - Panerai Harrods, London, UK
  - Panerai Harrods, Los Angeles, USA
  - Panerai Harrods, Beverly Hills, USA
  - Panerai Harrods, Dubai, UAE
  - Panerai Harrods, Shanghai, China
  - Panerai Harrods, Melbourne, Australia
- 2016:
  - Missoni Boutique, Florence, Italy
  - Gianvito Rossi Boutique, Los Angeles, USA
  - Officine Panerai, Paris, France
  - Panerai Toronto, Canada
  - Panerai, Las Vegas, USA
  - Panerai, Singapore, USA
  - Panerai, Ginza, Japan
  - Panerai , Hangzhou, China
- 2015:
  - Panerai, Milan, Italy
  - Missoni Flagship, Paris, France
  - Gianvito Rossi Boutique, NYC, USA
  - Panerai, Miami, USA
  - Missoni Boutique, Riyadh, Saudi Arabia
  - Missoni Boutique, Singapore
  - Officine Panerai, Paris, France
- 2014:
  - Missoni Boutique, Florence, Italy
  - Officine Panerai, Florence, Italy
  - Gianvito Rossi Boutique, London, UK
  - Santoni Boutique, NYC, USA
  - Missoni, Hong Kong
- 2013:
  - Missoni Flagship, Milan, Italy

=== Showrooms ===
- 2020:
  - Haworth, Lyon, France
  - Casa Mutina, Milan, Italy
- 2019:
  - Budri, Milan, Italy
  - Haworth, NYC, USA
  - BMW Welt, Munich, Germany
- 2018:
  - Cassina, Milan, Italy
  - Haworth, Madrid, Spain
- 2017:
  - Cassina, Paris, France
  - Haworth, Frankfurt, Germany
  - Kettal, Barcelona, Spain
- 2016:
  - Haworth, London, UK
  - Laufen, Madrid, Spain
  - Cassina, Madrid, Spain
- 2015:
  - Molteni & C, Tokyo, Japan
  - Cassina, NYC, USA
- 2011:
  - Scholtès, London, UK
- 2009:
  - Flos/Moroso, London, UK
- 2007:
  - Moroso, NYC, USA
- 2006:
  - B&B Italia, Barcelona, Spain
- 2004:
  - Knoll, Milan, Italy
- 2002:
  - Moroso, Milan, Italy

=== Offices ===
- 2024:
  - IXC Cassina Offices, Tokyo, Japan
- 2022:
  - Mutina Headquarters, Fiorano Modenese, Italy
- 2019:
  - Marienturm & Marienforum Towers, Frankfurt, Germany
- 2018:
  - Cassina Via Durini, Milan, Italy
- 2017:
  - Cassina Headquarters, Meda, Italy
- 2016:
  - Haworth Headquarters, Holland, Michigan, USA
- 2012:
  - Patricia Urquiola Studio, Milan, Italy

== Design projects ==
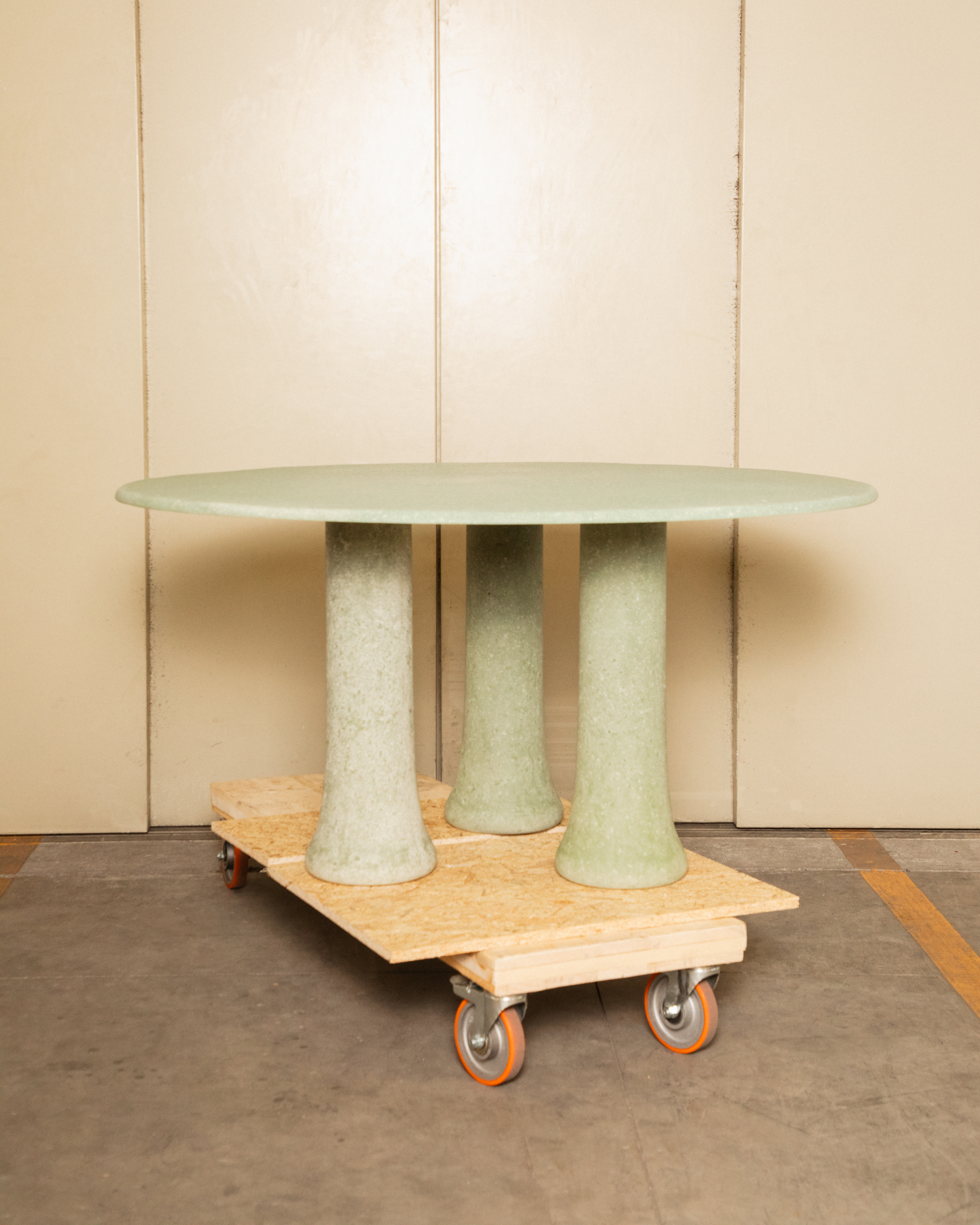
Babar, Glas Italia (2024)

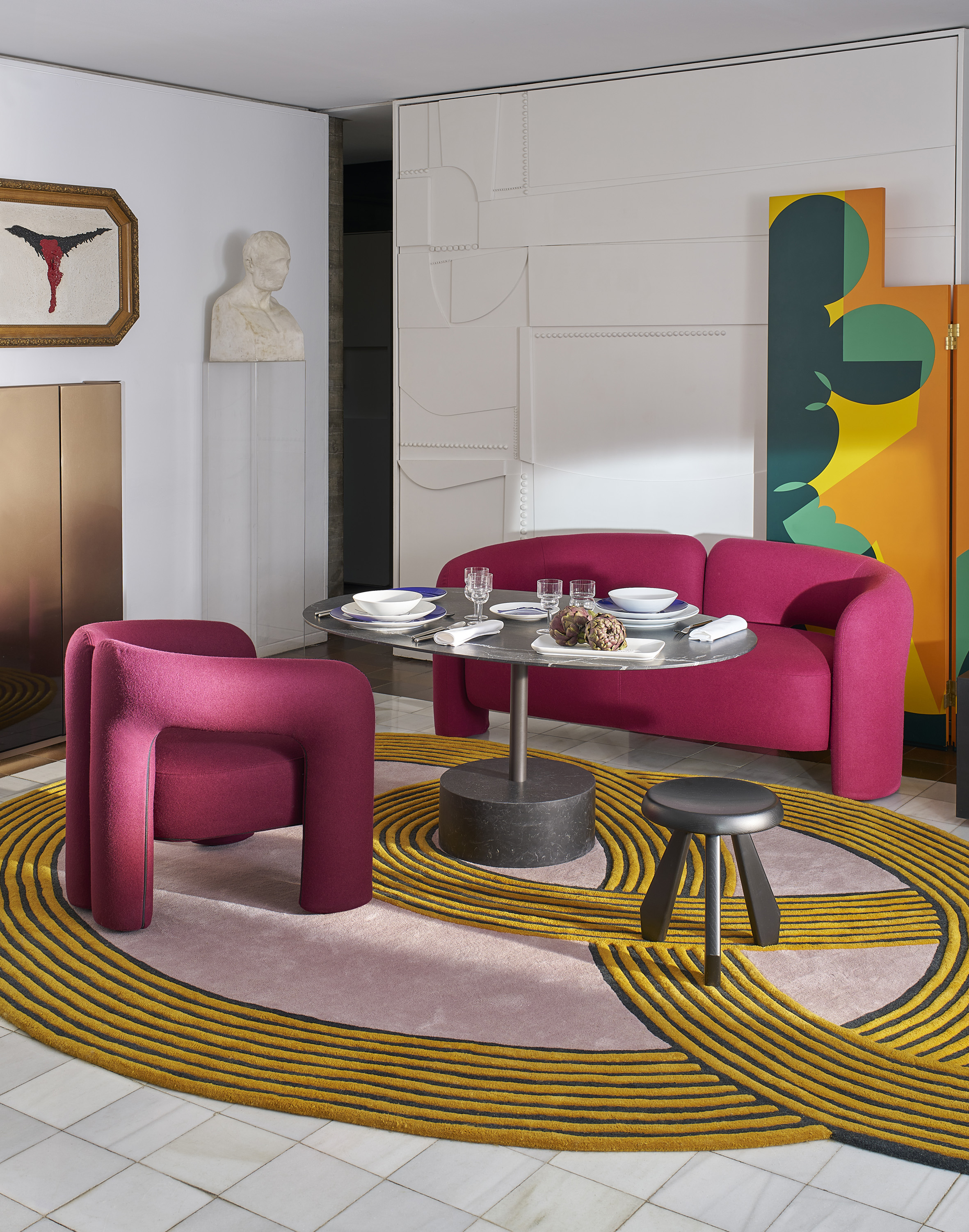
Dudet Sofa & Armchiar, Cassina (2024)

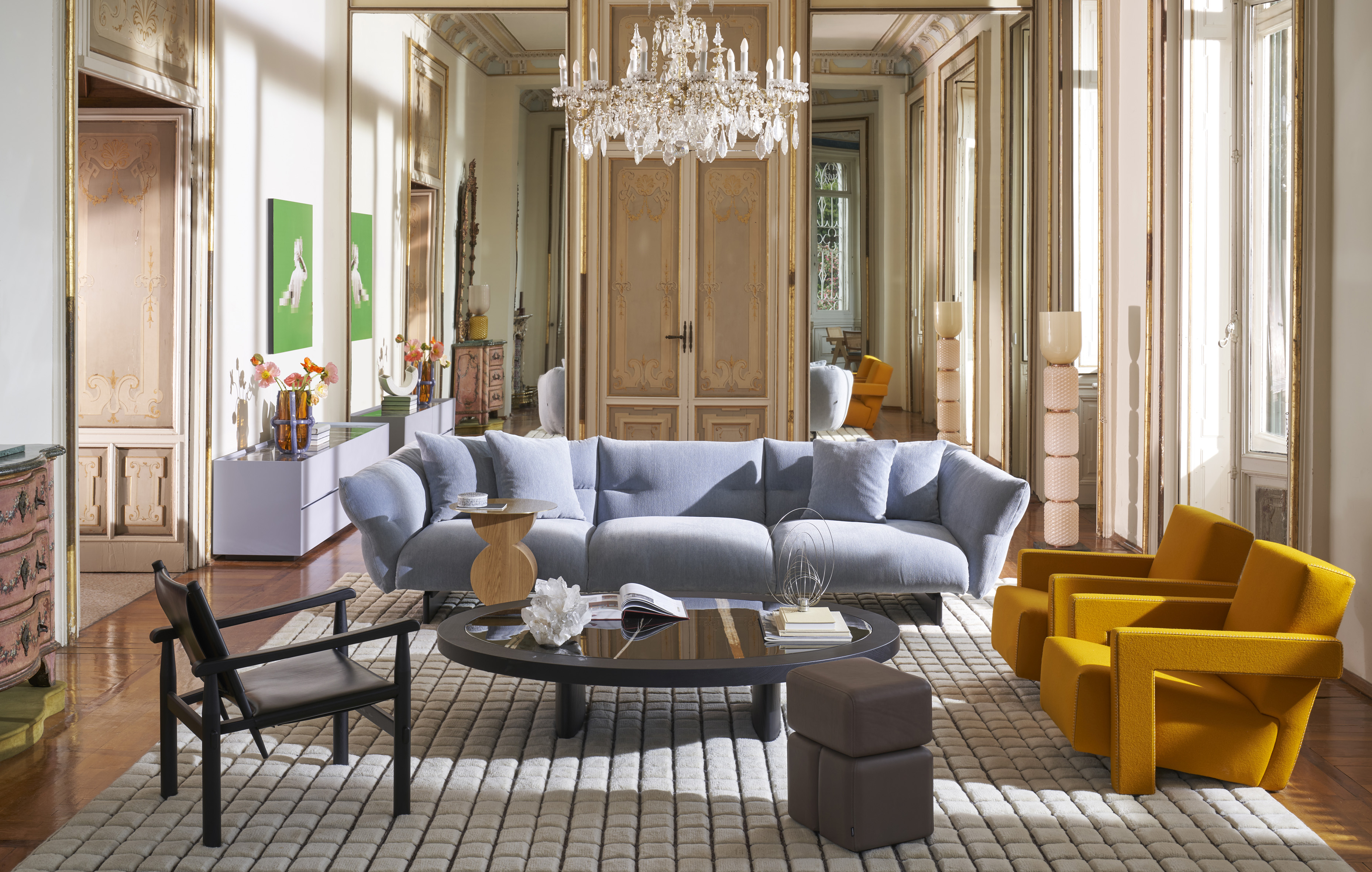
Moncloud Sofa, Cassina (2023)

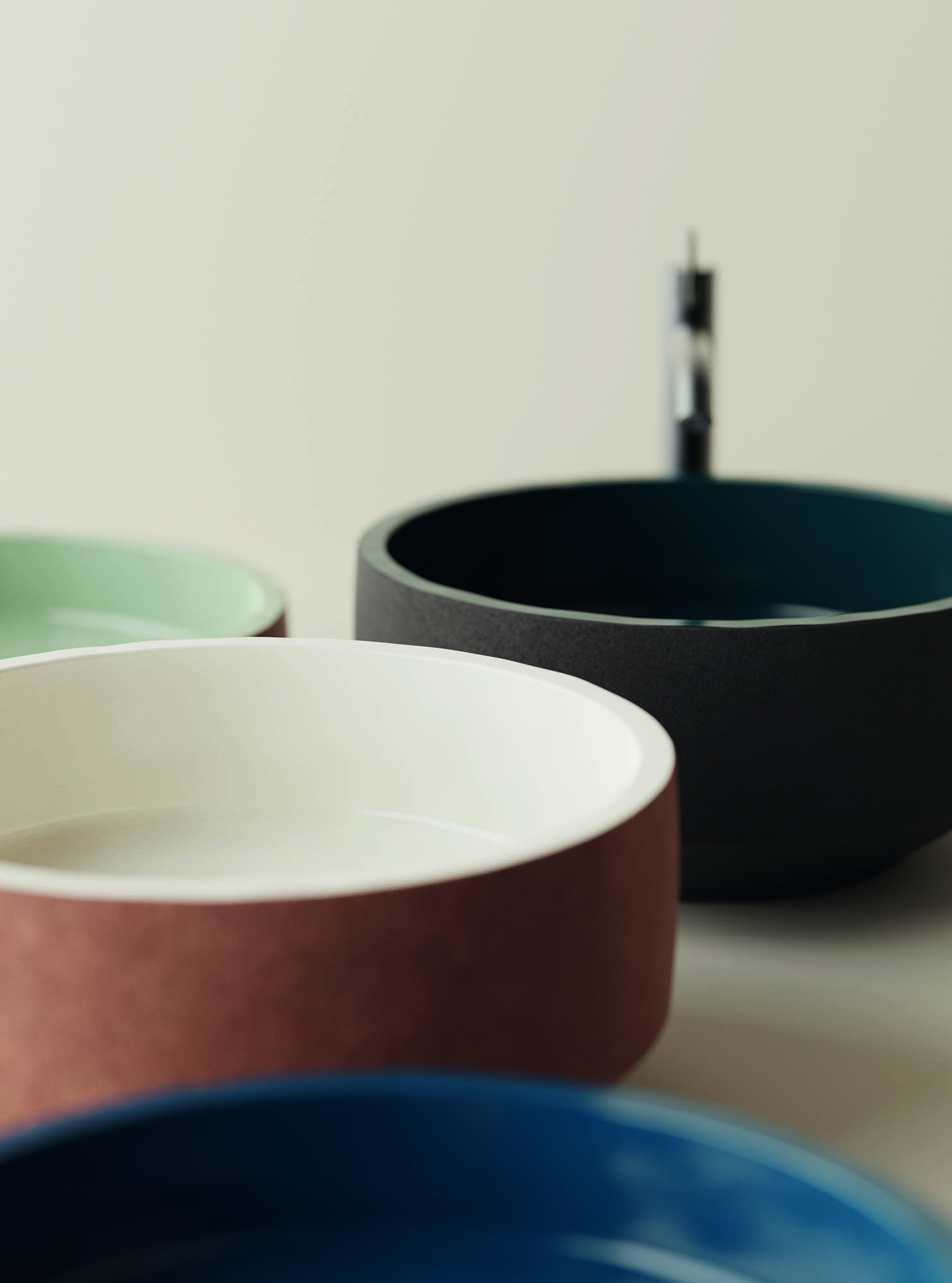
Cenote, Agape (2022)

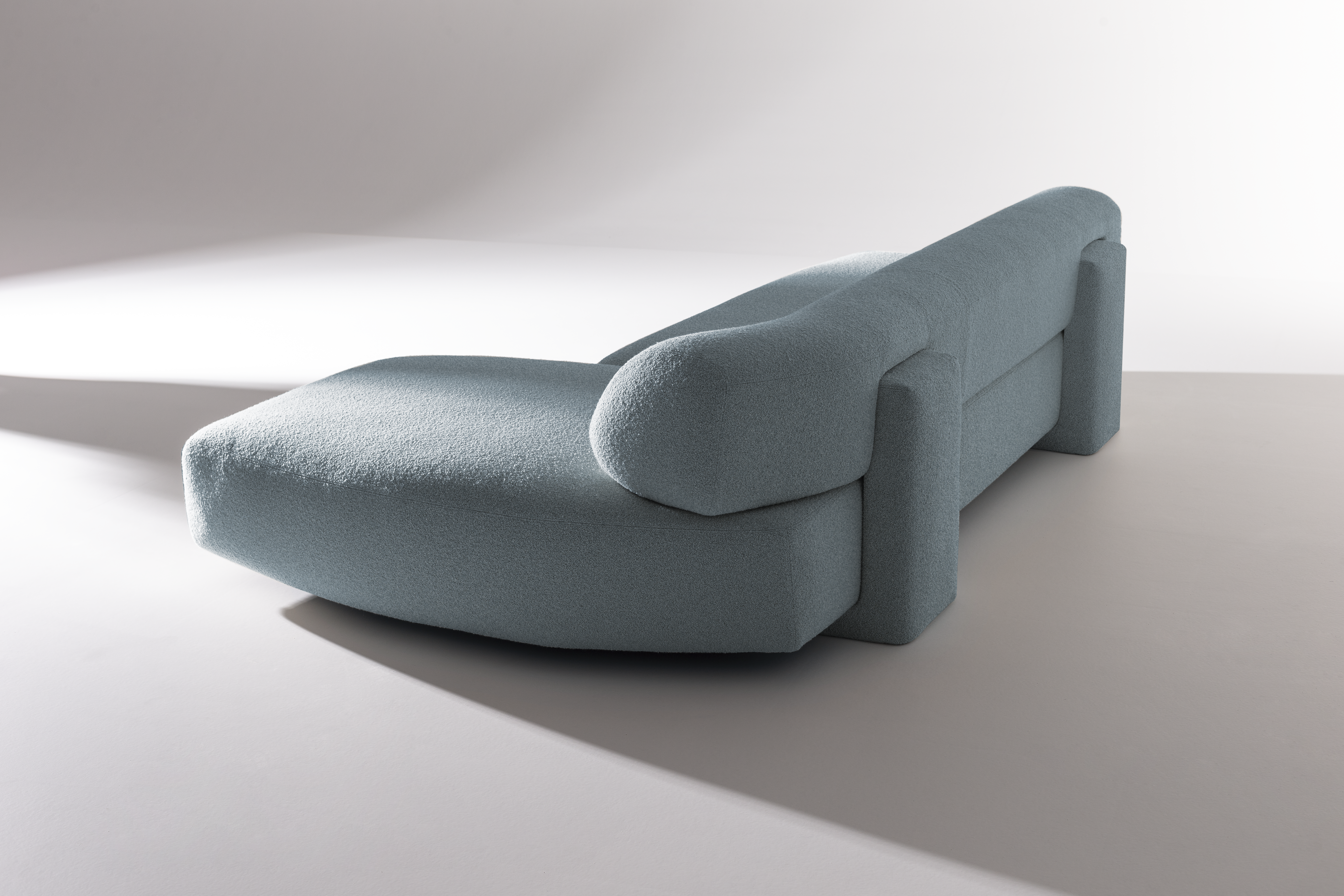
Gogan, Moroso (2019)

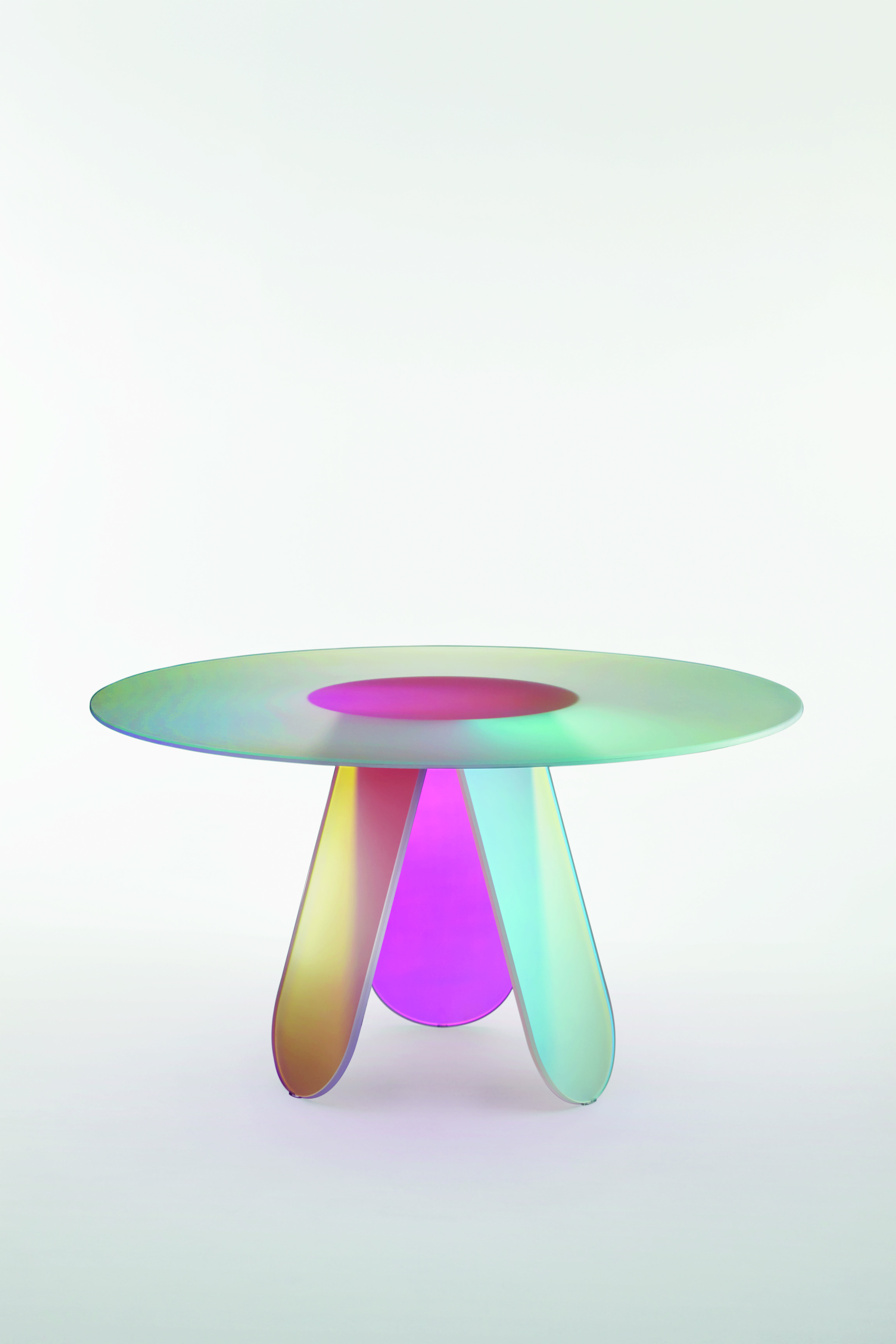
Shimmer, Glas Italia (2015)

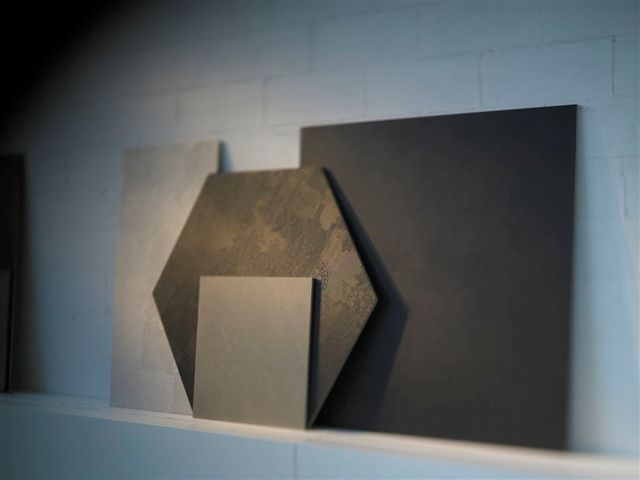
Déchirer, Mutina (2008)

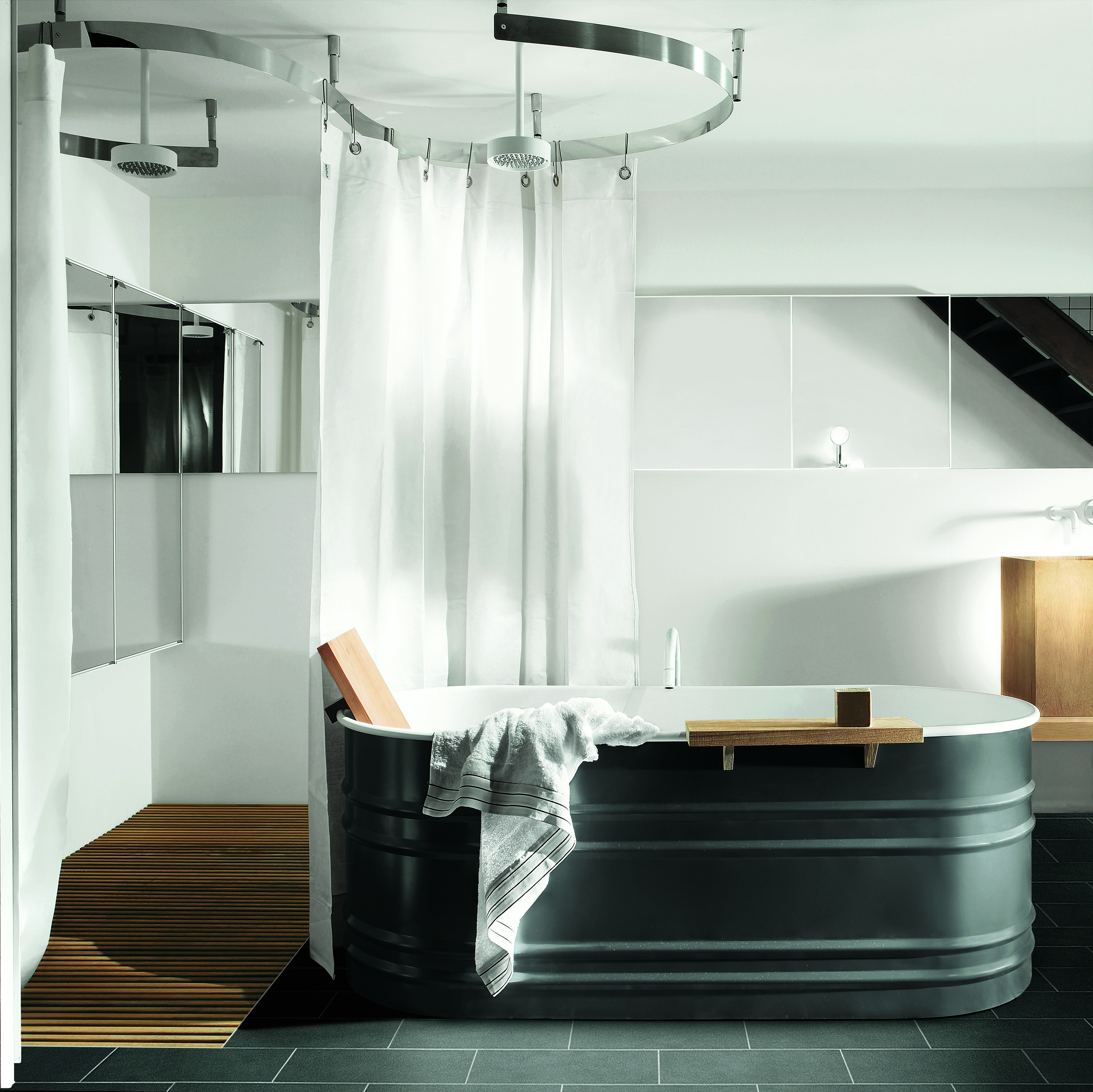
Vieques, Agape (2008)

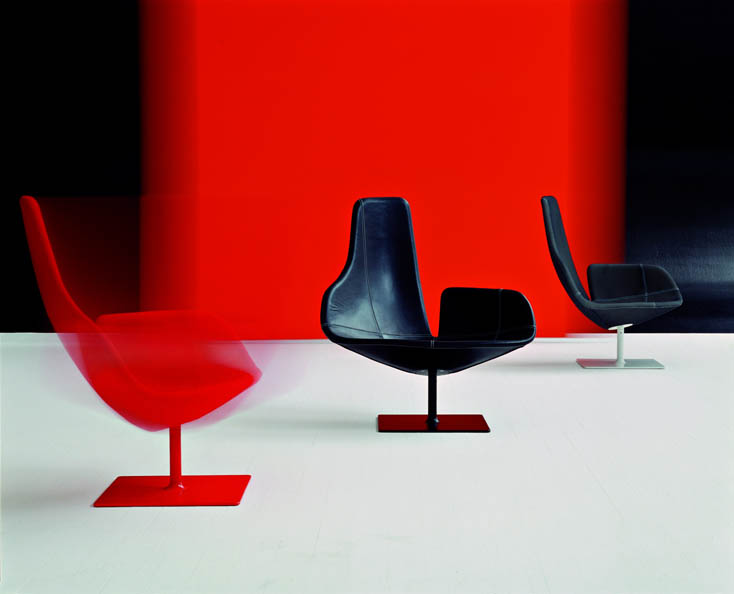
Fjord Chair, Moroso (2002)

- 2025:
  - Coffee Table, Merlate Coffee Table, for Bitossi
  - Bed, Mon-nid Bed, for Cassina
  - Rug, Cryptid, for cc-tapis
  - Bathroom collection, Balcoon, for Duravit
  - Side tables, Opalia Tables, for Glas Italia
  - Console, Lepid, for Kartell
  - Teapot, Ardilla Teapot, for Loewe
  - Armchair, Pecora Armchair, for Louis Vuitton
  - Sofa, Cuadra Soft, for Moroso
  - Sofa, Sedona, for Moroso
  - Bedside table, Tilt, for Moroso
  - Sofa, Gruuvelot, for Moroso
- 2024:
  - Bathtub, Cenote, for Agape
  - Stool, Valencia Stool, for Andreu World
  - Vases, Merlate Vases, for Bitossi
  - Picnic set, Tahiti Pic-nic, for Buccellati
  - Side table, Geodies, for Budri
  - Sofa, Lud’o Sofa, for Cappellini
  - Table, Lud’o Table, for Cappellini
  - Sofa and armchair, Dudet Sofa + Armchair, for Cassina
  - Armchair, Moncloud Armchair, for Cassina
  - Rug, Rigadino Rug, for Cassina
  - Blanket, Toncloud Blanket, for Cassina
  - Dining set, Trampoline Dining, for Cassina
  - Rug, M’ama Non M’ama, for cc-tapis
  - Rug, Sonora, for cc-tapis
  - Collection, Alberoni, for Cimento
  - Collection, Lazzaro, for Cimento
  - Collection, Riva, for Cimento
  - Collection, Naturalia, for Etel
  - Dining set, Babar, for Glas Italia
  - Seating collection, AALAND Family, for Kartell
  - Stool/Vases, Corteza, for Kartell
  - Modular sofa, Insula, for Kettal
  - Sofa, Gruuve, for Moroso
  - Bathroom collection, The Small Hours, for Salvatori
  - Kitchen, Mantle, for Signature Kitchen
  - Bench, Rocky Bench, for Technogym
  - Side table, Remis, for Glas Italia
  - Stool, Alder, for Mater
- 2023:
  - Washbasin, Cenote – Free Standing, for Agape
  - Sculpture, Octopoda, for Kvadrat
  - Modular sofa, Bolete, for Andreu World
  - Surface, Aquarel, for Budri
  - Shoes, Caban, for CABaN
  - Sofa, Moncloud, for Cassina
  - Mirror, No Vanitas, for Cassina
  - Rug, Panoplie, for cc-tapis
  - Outdoor rug, Mangas Outdoor, for Gandia Blasco
  - Side table, Robotin, for Glas Italia
  - Rug, Parays, for Kartell
  - Fabric, Sport, for Kvadrat
  - Armchair, Pheaby, for Moroso
  - Surfaces, Mater, Jali, Chamotte, for Mutina
  - Fabric, Desso & Patricia Urquiola, for Tarkett
  - Washbasin, Bloque, for Agape
- 2022:
  - Rug, Pipeline, for cc-tapis
  - Washbasin, Cenote, for Agape
  - Chair and table, Oru Chair and Table, for Andreu World
  - Small armchair, Lud’ina, for Cappellini
  - Sofa, Sengu Bold, for Cassina
  - Tables, Frari Tables, for Cimento
  - Stool, Zattere, for Cimento
  - Side table, Fondamenta, for Cimento
  - Vases, Erasmo, for Cimento
  - Mirror/Art, Canal Grande, for Cimento
  - Porcelain sculptures, Hybrida 2, for EDIT Capodimonte
  - Vases, Oxymoron, for Editions Milano
  - Lamp, Almendra, for Flos
  - Tables, Simoon Tables, for Glas Italia
  - Storage, Doble Storage, for Glas Italia
  - Lounge chair, Cardigan Knit, for Haworth
  - Fabrics, Rooms, for Jannelli & Volpi
  - Glasses, Hilo, for Jins
  - Sofa, Plumòn, for Kettal
  - Fabric, Punkto, for Kvadrat
  - Apparel, Habito, for Max Mara
  - Shoes, URBAN Shoes, for UYN
- 2021:
  - Outdoor collection, Vieques Outdoor, for Agape
  - Washbasin, Limon, for Agape
  - Fabrics, Bolon, for Bolon
  - Tables, Architexture, for Budri
  - Armchair, Dudet, for Cassina
  - Rug, Venus Power, for cc-tapis
  - Porcelain sculptures, Hybrida, for EDIT Capodimonte
  - Coffee table, Simoon, for Glas Italia
  - Chair, Charla, for Kartell
  - Side table, Undique, for Kartell
  - Sofa, Pacific, for Moroso
  - Bag, Off-White c/o Patricia Urquiola x Tessabit, for Off-White
  - Table, Taula, for Salvatori
- 2020:
  - Side tables, Raiz and Cascas, for Etel
  - Chair, Dalya, for Coedition
  - Surfaces, Grada and Quadra, for Alpi
  - Bags, Marvles, for Valextra (with Budri)
  - Office structure, Pergola, for Haworth
  - Rugs, Patcha, for cc-tapis
  - Curtain, Lumo, for Kvadrat
  - Fabrics, Relate and Reflect, for Kvadrat
  - Lounge chair, Nuez Lounge Bio®, for Andreu World
  - Lounge chair, Lud’o, for Cappellini
  - Armchairs, Getlucky, for Moroso
  - Armchairs, Ruff, for Moroso
  - Consoles, Cascas and Raiz, for Etel
  - Bed, Bio-mbo, for Cassina
  - Sofa, Sengu, for Cassina
  - Outdoor collection, Trampoline, for Cassina
- 2019:
  - Armchair, Back Wing, for Cassina
  - Rugs, Fordite, for cc-tapis
  - Outdoor lamp, Caule, for Flos
  - Rugs, Nuances, for Gan
  - Tables, Bisel, for Glas Italia
  - Outdoor collection, Anatra, for Janus et Cie
  - Seat, Gogan, for Moroso
- 2018:
  - Sofa, Bowy, for Cassina
  - Rug, Slinkie, for cc-tapis
  - Rug, Mirage, for Gan
  - Side table, L.A. Sunset, for Glas Italia
  - Chair, Vimini, for Kettal
  - Bowl, Overlay Bowl, for Louis Vuitton
  - Sofa, Chamfer, for Moroso
  - Table, Burin, for Viccarbe
- 2017:
  - Chair, Nuez, for Andreu World
  - Sofa, Super Beam, for Cassina
  - Rugs, Rotazioni, for cc-tapis
  - Rugs, Garden Layers, for Gan
  - Tables, Liquify, for Glas Italia
  - Washbasin collection, Sonar, for Laufen
  - Tiles, Déchirer XL, for Mutina
  - Tiles, Cover, for Mutina
- 2016:
  - Lounge chair, Gender, for Cassina
  - Rugs, Visioni, for cc-tapis
  - Sideboard, Credenza, for Editions Milano
  - Table accessories, Urkiola, for Georg Jensen
- 2015:
  - Bathtub, Lariana, for Agape
  - Sofa, Fat, for B&B Italia
  - Lamp, Serena, for Flos
  - Tables, Shimmer, for Glas Italia
  - Chair, Roll, for Kettal
  - Flooring, Biscuit, for Listone Giordano
  - Armchairs, Lilo, Mathilda, for Moroso
- 2014:
  - Handle, Conca, for Olivari
  - Armchair, Husk, for B&B Italia
  - Kitchen, Salinas, for Boffi
  - Bathroom collection, Rabbet, for Budri
  - Plates and glasses, Jellies, for Kartell
  - Sofa, (Love Me) Tender, for Moroso
- 2013:
  - Outdoor collection, Canasta 13’, for B&B Italia
  - Furniture collection, Earthquake 5.9, for Budri
  - Rug, Logenze, for Ruckstuhl
- 2012:
  - Handle, Lucy, for Olivari
  - Vases, Variations, for Baccarat
  - Daybed, Cottage, for Kettal
  - Sofa, M.a.s.s.a.s., for Moroso
- 2011:
  - Bathroom collection, Vieques, for Agape
  - Lamp, Tatou, for Flos
  - Armchair, Foliage, for Kartell
  - Armchair, Biknit, for Moroso
- 2010:
  - Rugs, Mangas, for Gan
  - Chair, Comback, for Kartell
  - Sofa, Redondo, for Moroso
  - Tiles, Tierras, for Mutina
- 2009:
  - Sofa, Night & Day, for Molteni
  - Handle, Adamant, for Olivari
  - Technology, Haori, for Panasonic
- 2008:
  - Armchair, Crinoline, for B&B Italia
  - Table, Mantis, for De Padova
  - Seating collection, Tropicalia, for Moroso
- 2007:
  - Armchair, Bergere, for De Padova
  - Outdoor chair, Pavo, for Driade
  - Outdoor collection, Maia, for Kettal
  - Seating collection, Antibodi, for Moroso
- 2006:
  - Sofa, Tufty-Time, for B&B Italia
  - Lamp, Caboche, for Foscarini
- 2004:
  - Collection, Fat Fat, for B&B Italia
- 2000:
  - Sofa, Lowland, for Moroso
- 1998:
  - Sofa, Step, for Moroso

== Awards ==
Urquiola has received the following awards:

- 2025 – HiP Award, Workplace: Table, Mater Alder – Haworth
- 2025 – HiP Award, Workplace: Stool, Valencia Stool – Andreu World
- 2025 – HiP Award, Sustainability, Alder Tables – Haworth
- 2025 – HiP Award, Sustainability, Valencia Stool – Andreu World
- 2025 – Best of NeoCon, Silver Award, Bolete Armchair – Andreu World
- 2025 – Best of NeoCon, Gold Award, Nina Lounge Andreu World
- 2025 – Best of NeoCon, Gold Award, Bolete Lounge Outdoor – Andreu World
- 2025 – Best of NeoCon, Silver Award, Bolete Lounge Outdoor – Andreu World
- 2025 – Best of NeoCon, Sustainability Award, Valencia Stool – Andreu World
- 2025 – Best of NeoCon, Sustainability Award, Alder Tables – Haworth
- 2024 – Best of NeoCon, Silver Award, Brezal Occasional Table – Andreu World
- 2024 – Best of NeoCon, Sustainability Award, Bolete Chair – Andreu World
- 2024 – Best of NeoCon, Sustainability Award, Bolete Conference Table – Andreu World
- 2023 – HiP Award, Product – Environmental Impact, Bolete Lounge BIO® – Andreu World
- 2023 – HiP Award, Furniture: Seating & Table, Bolete Lounge BIO® – Andreu World
- 2023 – Best of NeoCon, Sustainability Award, Bolete Occasional BIO® – Andreu World
- 2023 – Best of NeoCon, Business Impact Award, Bolete Lounge BIO® – Andreu World
- 2023 – Frame Award, Lifetime Achievement
- 2022 – HiP Award, Workplace: Lounge Seating, Urquiola Knit Lounge – Haworth
- 2022 – Best of NeoCon, Gold Award, Oru Chair – Andreu World
- 2022 – Best of NeoCon, Gold Award, Oru Table – Andreu World
- 2022 – Best of NeoCon, Innovation Award, Knit Lounge – Haworth
- 2021 – Best of NeoCon, Gold Award, Nuez Lounge BIO – Andreu World
- 2021 – Best of NeoCon, Sustainability Award, Nuez Lounge BIO – Andreu World
- 2021 – Best of NeoCon, Silver Award, Pergola – Haworth
- 2020 – HiP Award, Workplace: Lounge Seating, Lud’o Lounge – Haworth & Cappellini
- 2020 – HiP Award, Workplace: Meeting Room/Pod, Pergola – Haworth
- 2019 – HiP Award, Hospitality Seating, Back-Wing – Haworth/Cappellini
- 2019 – HiP Award, Workplace: High-Back Seating, Cabana Lounge – Haworth
- 2019 – Best of NeoCon, Gold Award, Cabana Lounge – Haworth
- 2019 – Best of NeoCon, Gold Award, Nuez Outdoor – Andreu World
- 2019 – Archiproducts Design Awards, Outdoor, Nuez Outdoor – Andreu World
- 2018 – Red Dot Design Award, Seating Conference, Nuez – Andreu World
- 2017 – HiP Award, Hospitality Seating, Nuez – Andreu World
- 2017 – EDIDA, Floor Covering category winner, Visioni – cc-tapis
- 2017 – EDIDA, Seating category winner, Gender – Cassina
- 2015 – EDIDA, Kitchen category winner, Salinas – Boffi
- 2015 – Laurea Honoris Causae – Shenkar College of Engineering and Design, Tel Aviv
- 2015 – Wallpaper, Designer of the Year*
- 2015 – Expo Milan Ambassador and member of Women for Expo
- 2015 – Titan Award – International Interior Design Association
- 2014 – EDIDA, Bedding category winner, Husk – B&B Italia
- 2014 – Premio Marisa Bellisario per Moda Arte Design
- 2014 – Best of NeoCon, Competition winner, Openest – Haworth
- 2013 – EDIDA, Outdoor category winner, Cottage – Kettal
- 2012 – EDIDA, Wall Covering category winner, Nat(f)Use – Budri
- 2012 – EDIDA, Outdoor category winner, Husk – B&B Italia
- 2012 – Architektur und Wohnen Magazine, Designer of the Year
- 2011 – German Design Award
- 2011 – EL MUNDO, 25 world's most influential persons – Trends Category
- 2011 – Interior Design Magazine, Hall of Fame
- 2011 – Medalla de Oro al Mérito en las Bellas Artes – King Juan Carlos I of Spain
- 2011 – Ordine Isabella la Cattolica
- 2010 – Premio «Título de Hija predilecta de la ciudad de Oviedo»
- 2010 – H.O.M.E. Magazine Germany, Best Designer of the first Decade of the 21st Century
- 2010 – Home e Häuser, Designer of the Decade (2000–2010)
- 2009 – EDIDA, Wall Covering category winner, Déchirer – Mutina
- 2009 – ICFF Awards, Carpet and Flooring category, Mangas – GAN
- 2008 – EDIDA, Bathroom category winner, Pear – Agape
- 2008 – AD Spain, Designer of the Year
- 2007 – EDIDA, Seating category winner, Antibodi – Moroso
- 2006 – Wallpaper, Designer of the Year*
- 2005 – Red Dot Design Award, Product Design, Diamond – Molteni
- 2005 – EDIDA, Bedding category winner, Fat Fat – B&B Italia
- 2005 – EDIDA, Designer of the Year
- 2004 – Good Design Award, Lighting – Bague Lamp – Foscarini
- 2003 – Design Prize, Best System Award
