= Shoulder pad (fashion) =

Pads attached inside a garment to shape the shoulders

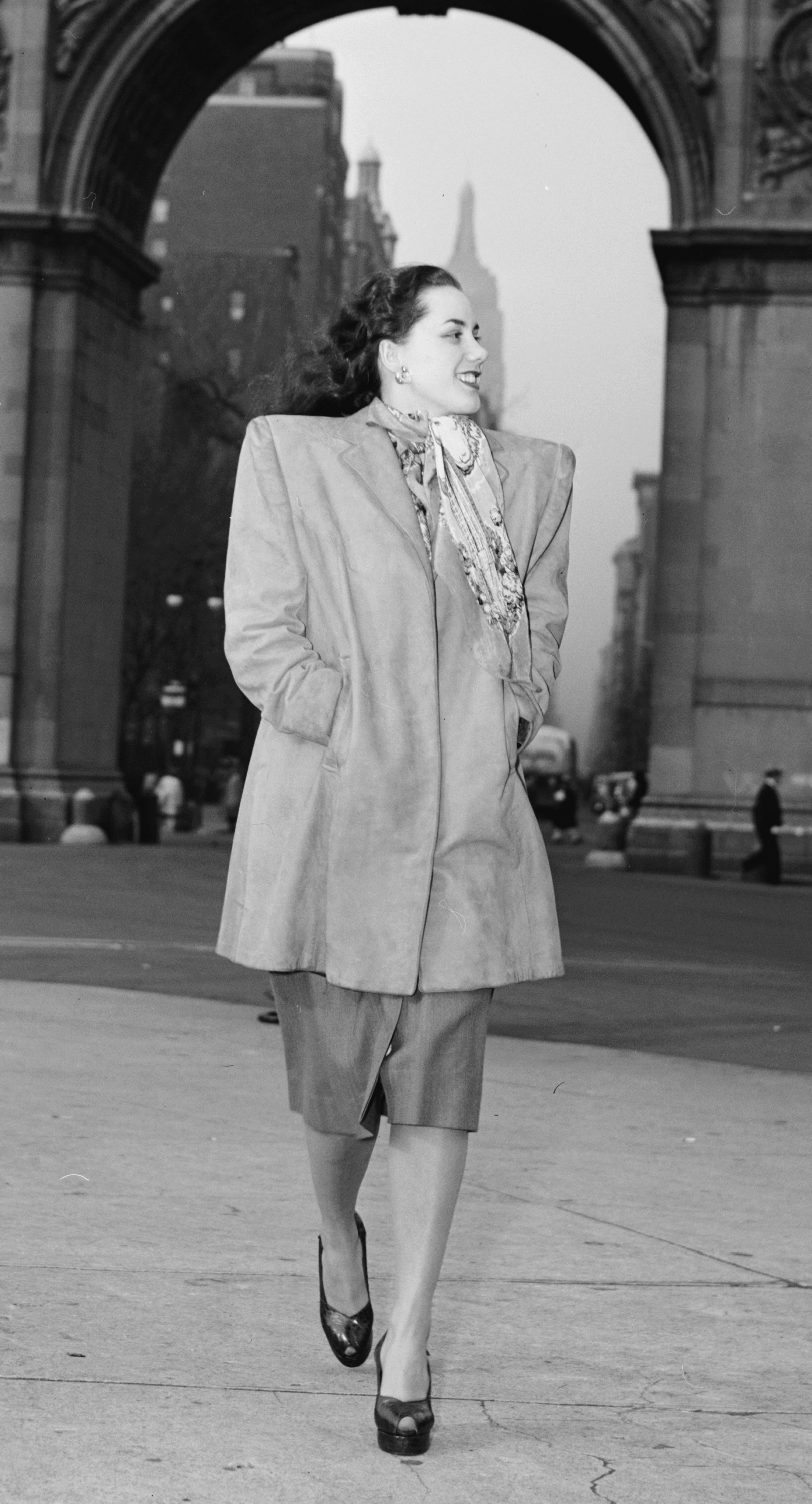
Jazz singer Ann Hathaway (1925-1997), wearing a coat with shoulder pads, walking on Washington Square, New York, 1947

Shoulder pads are a type of fabric-covered padding used in clothing to give the wearer the illusion of having broader and less sloping shoulders. In the beginning, shoulder pads were shaped as a semicircle or small triangle and were stuffed with wool, cotton, or sawdust. They were positioned at the top of the sleeve to extend the shoulder line. A good example of this is their use in "leg-o'-mutton" sleeves or the smaller puffed sleeves which are based on styles from the 1890s. In men's styles, shoulder pads are often used in suits, jackets, and overcoats, usually sewn at the top of the shoulder and fastened between the lining and the outer fabric layer. In women's clothing, their inclusion depends on the fashion taste of the day. Shoulder pads in clothing can compensate for people with narrow or sloping shoulders. They can also compensate for certain fabrics' natural properties, most notably suede blazers, due to the weight of the material. There are periods when pads intended to exaggerate the width of the shoulders are favored. As such, they were popular additions to clothing (particularly business clothing) during the 1930s and 1940s; the 1980s (encompassing a period from the late 1970s to the early 1990s); and the late 2000s to early 2010s.

== 1930 to 1945 ==
The shoulder pad was initially invented in 1877 for American football by a Princeton football player. By the second decade of the twentieth century, shoulder pads were appearing in non-athletic menswear. In women's fashion, shoulder pads originally became popular in the 1930s when fashion designers Elsa Schiaparelli and Marcel Rochas included them in their designs of 1931. Though Rochas may have been the first to present them, Schiaparelli was the most consistent in promoting them during the 1930s and '40s and it is her name that came to be most associated with them. Both designers had been influenced by the extravagant shoulder flanges and small waists of traditional Southeast Asian ceremonial dress. Costume designer Travis Banton's broad-shouldered designs for Marlene Dietrich also influenced public tastes.

Soon, broad, padded shoulders dominated fashion, seen even in eveningwear and perhaps reaching a peak of variety in 1935-36, when even Vionnet showed them; Rochas presented high, pinched-up shoulders; and Piguet outdid Rochas by extending his widened shoulders vertically like oars or paddles. Amid all this competing extravagance, the widest shoulders were still said to come from Schiaparelli, who hadn't given them up even when they briefly dropped out of favor with designers in 1933.

War was in the air during this entire period, and fashion reflected it in epaulettes and other martial details, but after World War II began in 1939, women's fashions became even more militarised. Jackets, coats, and even dresses in particular were influenced by masculine styles and shoulder pads became bulkier and were positioned at the top of the shoulder to create a solid look that sloped slightly toward the neck.

The shoulder-padded style had now become universal, found in all garments except lingerie, so standard that when US designer Claire McCardell wanted to remove them from her garments in 1940, her financiers feared their sales would suffer and insisted that pads be retained. McCardell's innovative response was to put them in with very simple stitching so that they could be easily removed by the wearer, prefiguring the flexibility of the velcro-fastened shoulder pads of the 1980s. The following year, British designer Molyneux also eliminated shoulder pads, part of a prophetic trend in high fashion that would be carried further by Balenciaga in 1945 and culminate in Dior's slope-shouldered 1947 Corolle collection.

Big shoulders were still popular in 1945, when Joan Crawford wore a fur coat with wide, exaggerated shoulders, also designed by Adrian, in the film Mildred Pierce.

In men's fashion, jacket and coat shoulders were also generally broad, often due to padding, though that varied from year to year. Zoot suits had their own share of popularity. Basically, a zoot suit is based on a "regular" 2-piece suit, yet one or two sizes larger, so it was supposed to be "padded like a lunatic's cell".

During this period, stiff, felt-covered cotton batting was the material used for most shoulder pads, a combination that allowed for easy adjustment but didn't hold its shape very well when washed.

== 1945 to 1970 ==
Balenciaga's 1945 endorsement of sloped shoulders signaled the direction that fashion was heading, and this was confirmed with Christian Dior's transformative 1947 Corolle collection, characterized by a striking natural shoulder line.

The popularity of shoulder pads with the public, too, ultimately tapered off later in the decade, after the war was over and women yearned for a softer, more feminine look.

During the late 1940s to about 1951, some dresses featured a soft, smaller shoulder pad with so little padding as to be barely noticeable. Its function seems to have been to slightly shape the shoulder line. By the 1950s, shoulder pads appeared only in jackets and coats — not in dresses, knitwear or blouses as they had previously during the heyday of the early 1940s.

Examples of 1950s jacket and coat padding: When Chanel reentered the fashion world in 1954, her jackets contained light padding. Some of the rounded-shoulder, barrel-shaped coats of the late 1950s, particularly those of Balenciaga and Givenchy, contained shoulder pads to widen the rounded line.

Through the early 1960s, coat and jacket shoulder pads slowly became less noticeable (with Marc Bohan's fall 1963 collection for Dior a notable exception) and midway through the decade, shoulder pads had disappeared. The rare times shoulder pads were seen in the final years of the decade, as in a Betsey Johnson tunic from 1967, they were seen as unusual and not as part of a trend.

In menswear, shoulder pads would remain pronounced in suits and sport jackets through the first half of the 1950s, but shoulders were narrowing, and they continued to diminish in size through the end of the decade. This would culminate in Pierre Cardin's influential 1960 men's collection, in which he emphasized a slim, youthful look that included a shoulder line that he described as "respected but unexaggerated," saying that big-shouldered "Tarzans" were now out of fashion. The most influential menswear designer of the 1960s, Cardin would eliminate shoulder pads in many jackets to achieve his fitted look.

== 1970s ==
Shoulder pads made their next appearance in women's clothing in the early 1970s, through the influence of British fashion designer Barbara Hulanicki and her label Biba. Biba produced designs influenced by the styles of the 1930s and 1940s, and so a soft version of the shoulder pad was revived. Ossie Clark was another London designer using shoulder pads at the time, showing forties-revival suits as early as 1968. During the first five years of the 1970s, a number of designers in other fashion capitals also presented padded shoulders with an explicit 1940s inspiration, constituting a minor trend that peaked in 1971. In 1970, Yves Saint Laurent showed forties-themed padded shoulders; in 1971, Angelo Tarlazzi, Yves Saint Laurent, Karl Lagerfeld for Chloé, Marc Bohan for Dior, Valentino, Jean-Louis Scherrer, Guy Laroche, Michel Goma for Patou, Michele Aujard, Thierry Mugler, and many New York designers; in 1972, Jean-Louis Scherrer and Scott Barrie; in 1973, Valentino, Jean-Louis Scherrer, and Daniel Hechter; and in 1974, Jean-Louis Scherrer and Nino Cerruti. These padded shoulders never reached mainstream acceptance, though; Saint Laurent's forties-revival attempts in particular were widely criticized, and so the look was relatively limited in reach, with designers showing and the public preferring the relaxed, natural, often jeans-based clothing styles typical of the times.

During the mid-1970s, Saint Laurent and a few others did show an occasional padded-shoulder jacket scattered among the popular ethnic and peasant looks, but sensibly proportioned, easy, and contemporary in appearance instead of being part of a forties look, suitable for the standard officewear women were preferring as they entered the workforce in greater numbers during the decade, a look codified with the 1977 publications of John T. Molloy's The Woman's Dress for Success Book and Michael Korda's Success!. The shoulder padding occasionally seen in these business blazers was unobtrusive, no more pronounced than in a standard men's suit jacket, and the most high-fashion versions carried no pads at all, in line with the unconstructed Big Look that dominated the fashion world at the time.

=== Fall 1978 ===
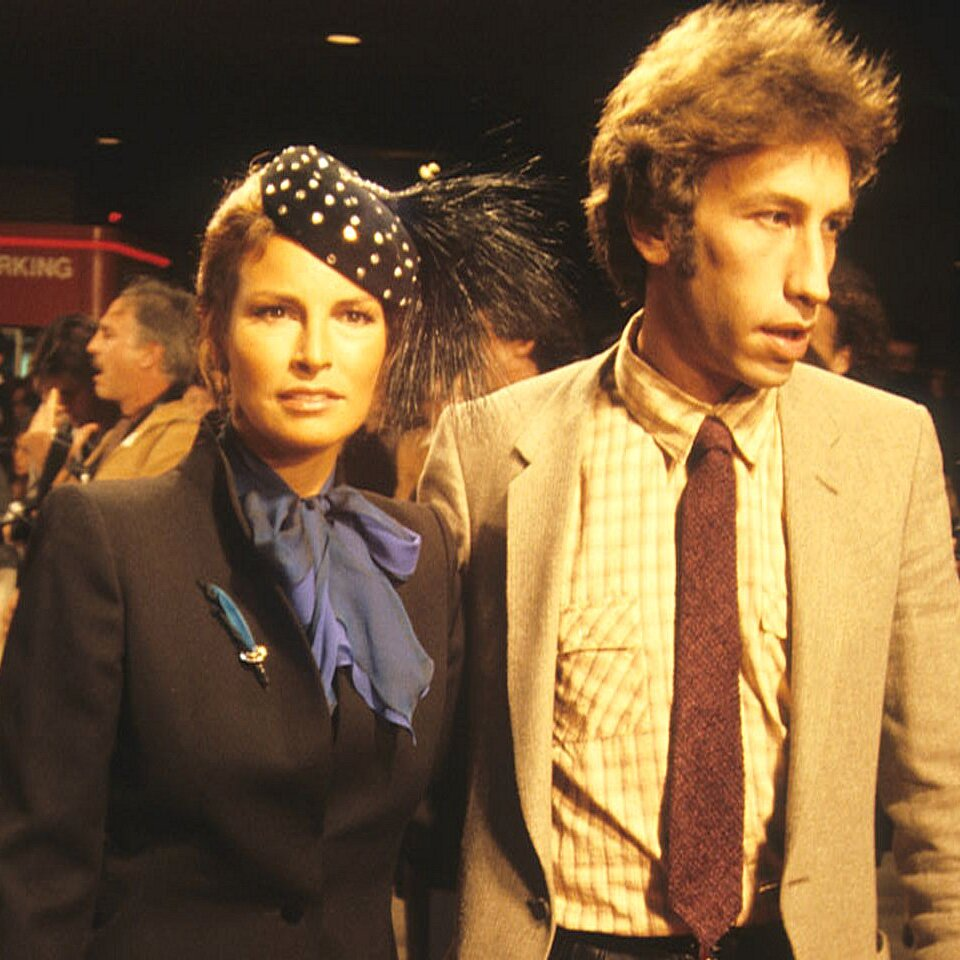
Actress Raquel Welch in 1979, wearing the shoulder pads and "retro"-look tilted hat favored by designers at the time

For fall 1978, designers in all fashion capitals suddenly endorsed wide, padded shoulders across the board, introducing the broad-shouldered styles that would characterize the 1980s. There had been some signs of a move toward broader shoulders the previous year, but it would be a January 1978 collection from the most influential designer of the time, Yves Saint Laurent, that would be accepted as the first clear expression of the trend when Saint Laurent showed a handful of jackets with exaggerated shoulder padding over slim trousers. Jean-Louis Scherrer showed somewhat similar square-shouldered designs two days before Saint Laurent, but it was Saint Laurent's shoulders that made an impression on the press. In later years, there would be various claims about who began the eighties big-shoulders trend, with Norma Kamali, Giorgio Armani, and several others variously cited as the exclusive originator, but Saint Laurent was the designer credited by fashion writers at its 1978 inception with launching the trend.

When most of the rest of the fashion world showed broad-shouldered looks a couple of months later, there would be two distinct versions of it. The first, favored by Paris designers like Saint Laurent, Karl Lagerfeld for Chloé, Thierry Mugler, Claude Montana, Pierre Cardin, Jean-Claude de Luca, Anne Marie Beretta, France Andrevie, and a number of others, was an explicit but exaggerated 1940s-revival silhouette based largely on tailored suits and dresses, though more a slim-skirted haute couture forties look than the flared-skirt, World War II Utility Suit-inspired shapes flirted with by Saint Laurent in the early seventies, no platform shoes or snoods this time. This first version was referred to as retro and included 1940s accessories, some mid-20th-century sci-fi looks, and military influences. A very dressy but subdued version of this 1940s-50s-derived look was adopted by designers like Givenchy, Valentino, Bill Blass, Oscar de la Renta, and a number of others.

The second version of the new broad-shouldered silhouette was a more contemporary sportswear look in which shoulder pads were added to easy but slimmed-down casualwear, favored largely by US and Italian designers like Perry Ellis, Norma Kamali, Calvin Klein, and Giorgio Armani.

This time, the shoulder line was usually continuous from outer edge to neck, without the dip toward the center seen in the 1940s, and the pads used, even when enormous, were much lighter and held their shape better than the ones used in the 1940s, now most often made of foam and other lightweight, well-shaped, moldable materials. As shoulder pads hadn't been this common in womenswear in decades, some in the fashion industry worried that the tailoring skills necessary for them had been lost and measures were taken to train workers in their proper placement.

Initially, this big change from the natural shoulder of the sixties and seventies could be extreme, with some designers showing shoulders three feet wide and others presenting pagoda shoulders, and the buying public was strongly resistant. The only US designer to have any commercial success with the new shoulder pads that first season was Perry Ellis, whose playful, more casual use of pads was a surprise sales hit. A similar approach by Norma Kamali would finally see large shoulder pads go completely mainstream a few years later, but not until the early 1980s. Meanwhile, undeterred, most designers continued to present the look through 1979, attempting to acclimate the public to it. Full acceptance wouldn't come until a couple of years into the eighties.

Most designers did adopt the new trend of padded shoulders, but a few prominent designers, Kenzo, Ralph Lauren, and Emanuel Ungaro among them, refrained, at least at first. Geoffrey Beene, who had been a pioneer of the Soft Look that had dominated the mid-seventies, did more than refrain, actively denouncing shoulder pads as regressive. Kenzo mostly adhered to his popular, easy, comfortable clothes even during the shoulder-padded eighties. Ralph Lauren continued with his familiar English country classics and devoted his fall 1978 collection to a cowboy theme, his shoulders the same size they had been in previous seasons. He wouldn't adopt the new big-shouldered silhouette until the following year and it would remain only a minor part of his offerings into the eighties. Ungaro would also only resist the new broad-shoulders trend for a season or two, during which he continued to show the easy, seventies Soft Look/Big Look, before enthusiastically adopting big-shoulder styles in 1979 and making the look his signature the following decade.

=== Shoulder pads in 1970s menswear ===
Standard, mass-market menswear during the 1970s continued to feature standard, unobtrusive shoulder pads shaping suits and sport jackets, but more high-fashion menswear basically followed the same trajectory as high-fashion womenswear, with a delay of about a season or two. Thus, there was a removal of shoulder pads and other internal structuring during the easy, oversized, unconstructed Big Look or Soft Look era of the mid-seventies, spearheaded in womenswear by Kenzo Takada in 1973-74 and in menswear by Giorgio Armani a couple of years later. When high-fashion womenswear reverted to highly structured garments with big shoulder pads for fall of 1978, high-fashion menswear followed suit the following year, Cardin replicating his women's pagoda shoulders in his men's suits and even Armani adding unusually pronounced shoulder pads to his men's jackets, a trend that would continue during the following decade.

== 1980s ==
The early 1980s continued a trend begun in the late 1970s toward a resurgence of interest in the ladies' evening wear styles of the early 1940s, with peplums, batwing sleeves and other design elements of the times reinterpreted for a new market. The shoulder pad helped define the silhouette and continued to be made in the cut foam versions introduced in the fall 1978 collections, especially in well-cut suits reminiscent of the World War II era. These styles had initially been resisted by the public at their 1978 introduction, but designers continued to present exaggerated shoulder pads into the eighties so that they saturated the market and women did come to adopt them, with everyone from television celebrities to politicians wearing them. For example, British Prime Minister Margaret Thatcher was internationally noted for her adoption of these fashions as they more and more became the norm. Before too long, these masculinized shapes were adopted by women seeking success in the corporate world, women who in the mid-seventies had worn sensibly proportioned blazers for the same purpose, and exaggerated shoulder pads later became seen as a symbol of women's attempts to smash the glass ceiling, a mission that was aided by their notable appearance in the US TV series Dynasty, whose stars' broad-shouldered, Valentino-inspired outfits were designed by Nolan Miller.

As the decade wore on, exaggerated shoulder pads became the defining fashion statement of the era, known as power dressing (a term that had previously been applied to the more sensibly proportioned business blazers of the mid-seventies) and bestowing the perception of status and position onto those who wore them. Some of the exaggerated shoulder pad sizes from the fall 1978 introduction of the trend became accepted and even common among the public by the mid-eighties. Every garment from the brassiere upwards would come with its own set of shoulder pads, with women frequently layering one shoulder-padded garment atop another, a trend launched by designers in 1978.

To prevent excessive shoulder padding, velcro was sewn onto the pads so that the wearer could choose how many sets to wear. The ability to remove shoulder pads also helped prevent deforming the pads in the wash, but discomfort could result if the pad wasn't attached securely to the velcro strip and the rough side scratched the skin. Other problems experienced by women as shoulder pads became widespread included slipping and displacement of the pads in oversized garments and interference with purse straps.

Prominent designers of big shoulders who had name recognition with the public during this period included Norma Kamali, Emanuel Ungaro, and Donna Karan. Kamali was one of a number of designers who, instead of just reviving highly tailored 1940s-style suits, added large shoulder pads to more contemporary sportswear styles, achieving great fame and influence in 1980 by showing sweatshirt-fabric versions of the flounced, hip-yoked, mini-length skirts she had introduced in 1979 (called rah-rah skirts in the UK) and presenting them with hugely shoulder-padded tops in the same material, the pads removable via velcro. Kamali was the first designer to make prominent use of velcro-fastened shoulder pads. Some made the plausible claim that the worldwide success of this collection is what finally made shoulder pads acceptable to the public after two or three years of designers promoting them. In 1984, she made a video showcasing her fall collection that included a song about shoulder pads, featuring lines like, "She's got big shoulder pads for men to cry on."

Ungaro became perhaps the most commercially successful of the Paris designers of the period by maximizing the use of seductive-looking shirring, ruching, and draping in large-shouldered dresses and suits, part of a reintroduced Schiaparelli-era trend of Edwardian revival. Donna Karan, who had achieved fame in the 1970s as one of the designers behind the Anne Klein label, opened her own house in the mid-eighties, specializing in versatile separates for working women as she had in the seventies, but with eighties-style big shoulder pads and more formal glamor added to conform to the times. Though distracting to the eye today, exaggerated shoulder pads were so normal during the eighties that the huge shoulders of Karan, Ungaro, and others were often not even commented on by fashion writers.

Throughout the Fall 1978-through-1980s big-shoulder-pads period, designers and fashion writers often said that the current year's shoulders were not as big as the previous year's. Because of the public's initial rejection of the fashion industry's 1978-79 presentation of exaggerated shoulder pads, many designers backed away from them in 1980 and '81. Nonetheless, a number of prominent designers continued to show them during that period and shoulder emphasis continued to be a feature of many styles. Often, means besides or in addition to shoulder pads were used to enlarge the shoulder, including puff-top sleeves, tucks and pleats, shoulder flanges, and stiffened ruffles. Norma Kamali's light-hearted use of shoulder pads was a surprise hit with the public from 1980 to 1982, so that when many designers returned to favoring tailored padded shoulders in 1982 and enlarged them yet again from 1983 to 1985, the public was more inclined to accept them and followed along, even with enthusiasm. There were some designers who never really took up big shoulder pads, particularly Japanese designers like Kenzo and Issey Miyake, and it was never the only look around during the decade, but by and large, most mainstream designers and manufacturers put them in everything, with almost all creating their own versions of the heavily structured, prominently shoulder-padded eighties suit jacket, even normally independent designers like Mary McFadden, Jean Muir, André Courrèges, and Giorgio di Sant'Angelo. The most consistent in showing particularly huge shoulders throughout the period was probably Claude Montana, who declared in 1985, "Shoulders forever!" Nicknamed "King of the Shoulder Pad," Montana's silhouette designs were credited with defining the 1980s power-dressing era.

Eighties designers even incorporated big shoulder pads when they were doing revival styles from earlier, non-shoulder-padded eras like the 1950s and 1960s. For instance, a version of the 1950s chemise dress was widely shown by designers from the 1978 inception of the big-shoulder era into the eighties, but with shoulder pads instead of authentic 1950s sloped shoulders. Similarly, when Thierry Mugler did sixties-revival styles in 1985, they included his characteristic enormous shoulder pads. Even sixties-revivalist Stephen Sprouse showed his period-perfect shift and trapeze minidresses in the eighties with broad-shouldered jackets and topcoats and produced his own versions of the shoulder-padded undergarments popular in the mid-eighties. Designers producing more eighties-looking minidresses added shoulder pads because they felt that prominent shoulders helped balance out the increased expanse of leg. During a brief general designer return to a sort of mid-seventies style of long dirndl skirts and shawls for Fall 1981, many shoulders remained broad and padded, very unlike the seventies.

All of this had an effect on the public, so that by the end of the era, some mass-market shoulder pads were the size of dinner plates and people were no longer shocked by them as they had been at their 1978 introduction.

In 1986, UK music group the Fall, a favorite of avant-garde artists like Michael Clark and Leigh Bowery, included a song on their Bend Sinister album entitled "Shoulder Pads," which mentions shoulder pads as an unacceptable fad. During the mid-eighties, there were clear signs of a move away from big shoulder pads among several prominent designers, with Vivienne Westwood introducing her famous 1985-86 mini-crini specifically to, as she put it, "kill this big shoulder." Christian Lacroix's celebrated mini-pouf skirt collections of 1986-87 were dominated by sloping, fichu shoulders. The two designers most noted for showing huge shoulders at the start of the era, Thierry Mugler and Claude Montana, brought their shoulders down in size somewhat mid-decade, with Montana giving up big shoulders entirely by 1988, when he began showing collections with completely natural shoulders. Pierre Cardin's shoulders had rivaled Claude Montana's in size since 1978, but he too began reducing padding in the mid-eighties. Karl Lagerfeld, who had been an early leader in the 1978 move to huge shoulders, for 1986 took pads from the shoulders and placed them visibly on the outside of the hips. Two years later, he would proclaim that shoulders would now be "tiny." Yves Saint Laurent had initiated the eighties big-shoulder trend in January 1978 and had been a shoulder-pad stalwart throughout the intervening years, but in 1988 even his shoulders, while still padded, had been noticeably narrowed. Avant-garde designers like Adeline André and Marc Audibet had long shown sloped shoulders with no pads, as had Romeo Gigli, who was hailed as the most prophetic designer of the end of the eighties. He showed almost exclusively natural, sloping shoulders, even on tailored jackets. This direction among designers was clear enough that in The Washington Post's New Year in/out list for 1989, "Shoulder pads" were listed as out and "Shoulders" were listed as in.

The public and retailers, though, had embraced shoulder pads wholeheartedly by the end of the decade, feeling that they filled out their form and gave clothes a more saleable "hanger appeal." A 1988 broadcast of the popular US TV program The Oprah Winfrey Show featured a segment entitled "Hide Your Figure Flaws with Shoulder Pads" that showed wardrobe consultants adding prominent shoulder pads to audience members' outfits and the host recommending maintaining a separate wardrobe drawer dedicated exclusively to shoulder pads, with the audience nodding in agreement, quite a change from the public's rejection of these styles when designers first introduced them in 1978. Shoulder pad manufacturers were now flourishing, with literally millions of pads produced every week. Many women seemed reluctant to give up big shoulder pads as designers began sending new signals in the late eighties. Prominent shoulder pads would not completely disappear until into the nineties.

=== Shoulder pads in 1980s menswear ===
In menswear, the exaggerated shoulder pads that had been introduced into high-fashion clothing in 1979 would continue to various degrees throughout the eighties, even becoming mainstream, with many everyday business suits having more pronounced shoulders than had usually been worn in the seventies. High-fashion shoulder pad shapes would vary with the whims of designers, a sharp-edged pad preferred one season, a more rounded pad preferred another. Part of what drove these styles was the increased proliferation of serious working out in the eighties after widespread fitness and health pursuits had emerged in the seventies. Near-bodybuilder physiques became normal sights starting in the eighties for everyday people, both on the streets and in advertising, and jacket shapes seemed to echo this, sometimes by padding the shoulders and shaping the cut even more to a V-shape, other times by leaving out or reducing the pads to allow the newly built-up wearer's own body to give the jacket shape. By the end of the eighties, there was a fad for often brightly colored sport jackets with big shoulders worn over deep-cut, also often brightly colored muscle tank tops or string tank shirts, or even no shirt at all, letting a well-worked-out torso show and sometimes allowing the shoulder-padded jacket to slide off the wearer's own chiseled shoulder, a style that would continue into the early nineties.

== 1990s ==
The shoulder pad fashion carried over from the late 1980s with continued popularity in the early 1990s, but wearers' tastes were changing due to a backlash against 1980s culture. Some designers continued to produce ranges featuring shoulder pads into the mid-1990s, as shoulder pads were prominent in women's formal suits and matching top-bottom attire, highly exemplified in earlier episodes of The Nanny from 1993 and 1994, where costume designer Brenda Cooper outfitted star Fran Drescher in things like late-eighties-style square-shouldered jackets by Moschino and Patrick Kelly. The velcro-fastened shoulder pads of the eighties were still familiar items in the early nineties. In 1993, a US patent was even registered for a removable shoulder pad that contained a hidden pocket to hide valuables. But as the decade wore on, shoulder-padded styles became outdated and were shunned by young and fashion-conscious wearers. Appearances were reduced to smaller, subtler versions augmenting the shoulder lines of jackets and coats.

== 2000s and 2010s ==
The late 2000s and early 2010s saw the resurgence of shoulder pads. Many young women imitated pop artists, mainly Lady Gaga and Rihanna, who were known for their use of shoulder pads in their stylistic outfits. There was a large presence of shoulder pads on many runways, in fashion designer collections, and a revival of 1980s trends became mainstream among many people who were interested in them. By the 2009-2010 seasons, shoulder pads had made their way back into the mainstream market. By 2010 many retailers like Wal-Mart had shoulder pads on at least half of all women's tops and blouses.

The late 2010s saw another resurgence of shoulder pads. With the rise of the Me Too movement and other female empowerment movements, the increase of women being elected to political positions, and a continuing revival of 1980s trends, many are opting to wear clothes with shoulder pads.

== See also ==
- 1940s in Western fashion
- 1980s fashion
- Epaulette
