= Norma Kamali =

American fashion designer (born 1945)

- Born: Norma Arraez; June 27, 1945 (age 81); New York City, U.S.
- Education: Fashion Institute of Technology
- Occupation: Fashion designer
- Years active: 1968–present
- Website: normakamali.com

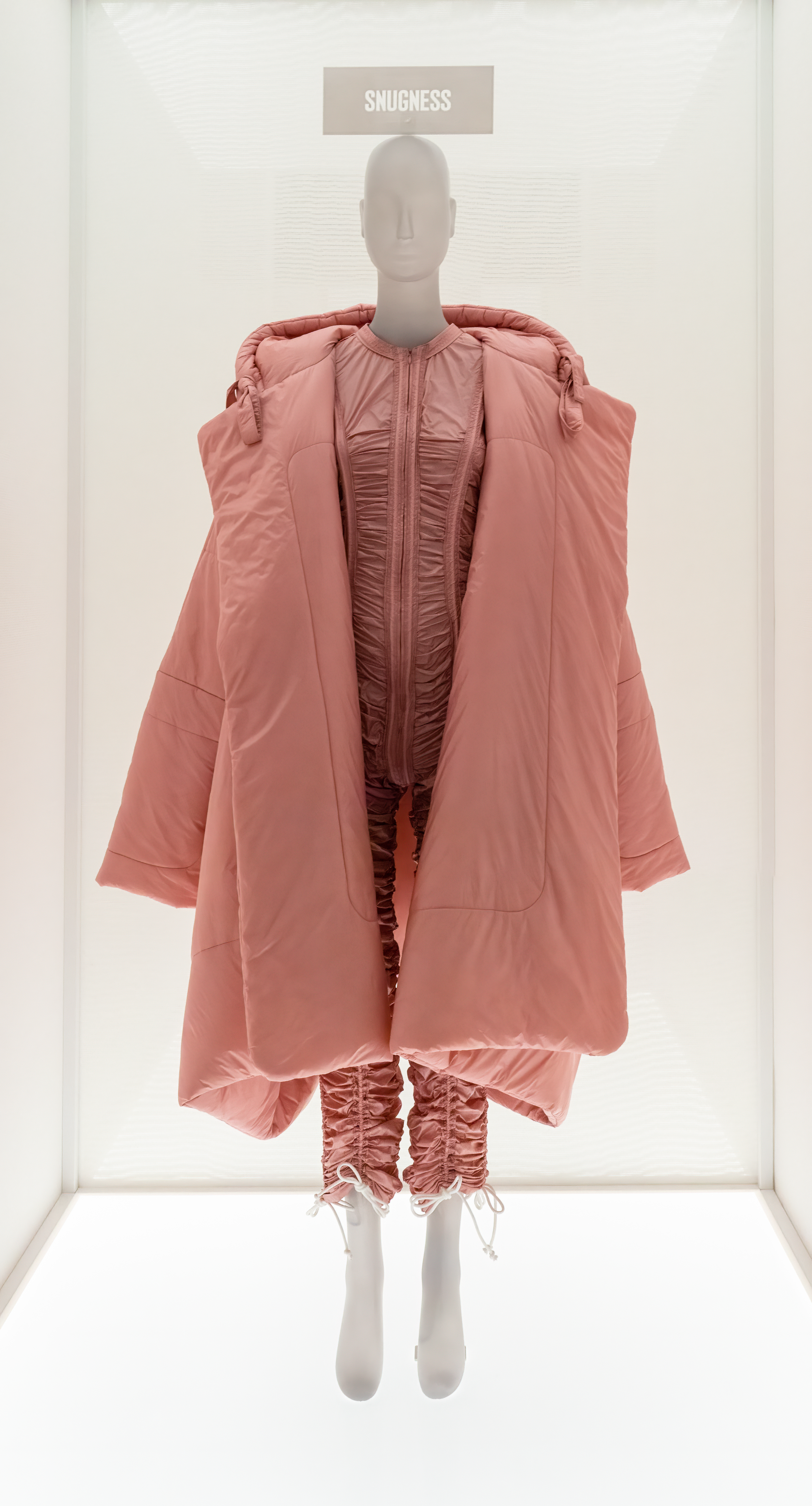
A coat Kamali designed in 2021 at the Metropolitan Museum of Art for the In America: A Lexicon of Fashion exhibition

Norma Kamali (born June 27, 1945) is an American fashion designer and entrepreneur best known for the "Sleeping Bag" Coat, sweats as everyday sportswear, and swimwear. She lives in New York City.

== Early life and education ==
Norma Arraez was born on June 27, 1945, to Estrella C. Galib Arraez Granofsky and Salvador Mariategui William Arraez, a middle class family residing in Manhattan's Upper East Side in New York City. She is of Lebanese and Basque descent. Aspiring to become a painter. Kamali attended the Fashion Institute of Technology and earned a degree in illustration. Her first job was working for Northwest Orient Airlines from 1966 to 1967, operating a Univac computer. She started going to London every weekend for four years. In an interview, she says that her mother Estrella planted a seed when telling her to become independent and pushed her to make her own clothes early on.

== Career ==
In 1967, at the age of 22, Kamali opened a small New York boutique in a 9-by-10-foot basement space, renting for $285 per month with her then-husband Mohammed Houssein "Eddie" Kamali. The business was founded with the goal of designing original clothing that differed from what was then available in the market, concentrating on London-style street looks, including the 1940s-revival looks that were trendy in 1971 and that Kamali would play with throughout her career. Early in the company’s development, Kamali encountered skepticism regarding her ability to design garments and manage a business. After being told that certain designs were not feasible, she learned pattern-making herself in order to independently develop and produce her designs. By 1968 she was designing her own pieces: looks with elaborate appliques, tie-die velvets, rhinestone-studded T-shirts and hot pants - the first in NYC. This is also when she created the All In One Dress that she still sells today and other multi-style jersey designs.

Norma Kamali designed her famous Sleeping Bag Coat in 1973 after a camping trip inspired her to create a wearable garment from a sleeping bag.

In 1974, the couple opened a shop called Kamali on Madison Avenue. She makes the Parachute Collection made from actual silk parachutes. She became known for her line of clothing made of real silk parachutes, which included the innovation of being adjustable in length and fit by drawstring, a characteristic feature of the mid-seventies Big Look period, and she still makes parachute clothing today. Diana Vreeland includes them in her Metropolitan Museum of Art Costume Institute curation looking at the future of fashion contrasted.

After their divorce in 1975, Norma Kamali opened her own independent boutique called OMO Norma Kamali, OMO standing for "on my own."

During the early seventies, she started producing one-piece maillot bathing suits stripped of structuring to achieve a sleek, racy shape on which she altered leg cuts and back cuts to create a great variety of looks. Those in glamour fabrics like gold lamé garnered particular attention from fashion-watchers, especially when Cosmo puts Francesco Scavullo’s photo of Christie Brinkley in the Pull Bikini on its cover. By the mid-seventies, she was well known for her swimsuits, and the very high leg cuts on some of her swimwear from the second half of the seventies set a trend that lasted through the following decade. She used fabrics with Lycra both for her swimsuits and for clothing to dance in at Studio 54. Kamali designed the red one-piece bathing suit worn by Farrah Fawcett in the iconic 1976 poster (later considered the best-selling poster of all time) and the bathing suit worn by Whitney Houston on the back cover of her 1985 debut album. Farrah Fawcett's suit was donated to the Smithsonian National Museum of American History in 2011.

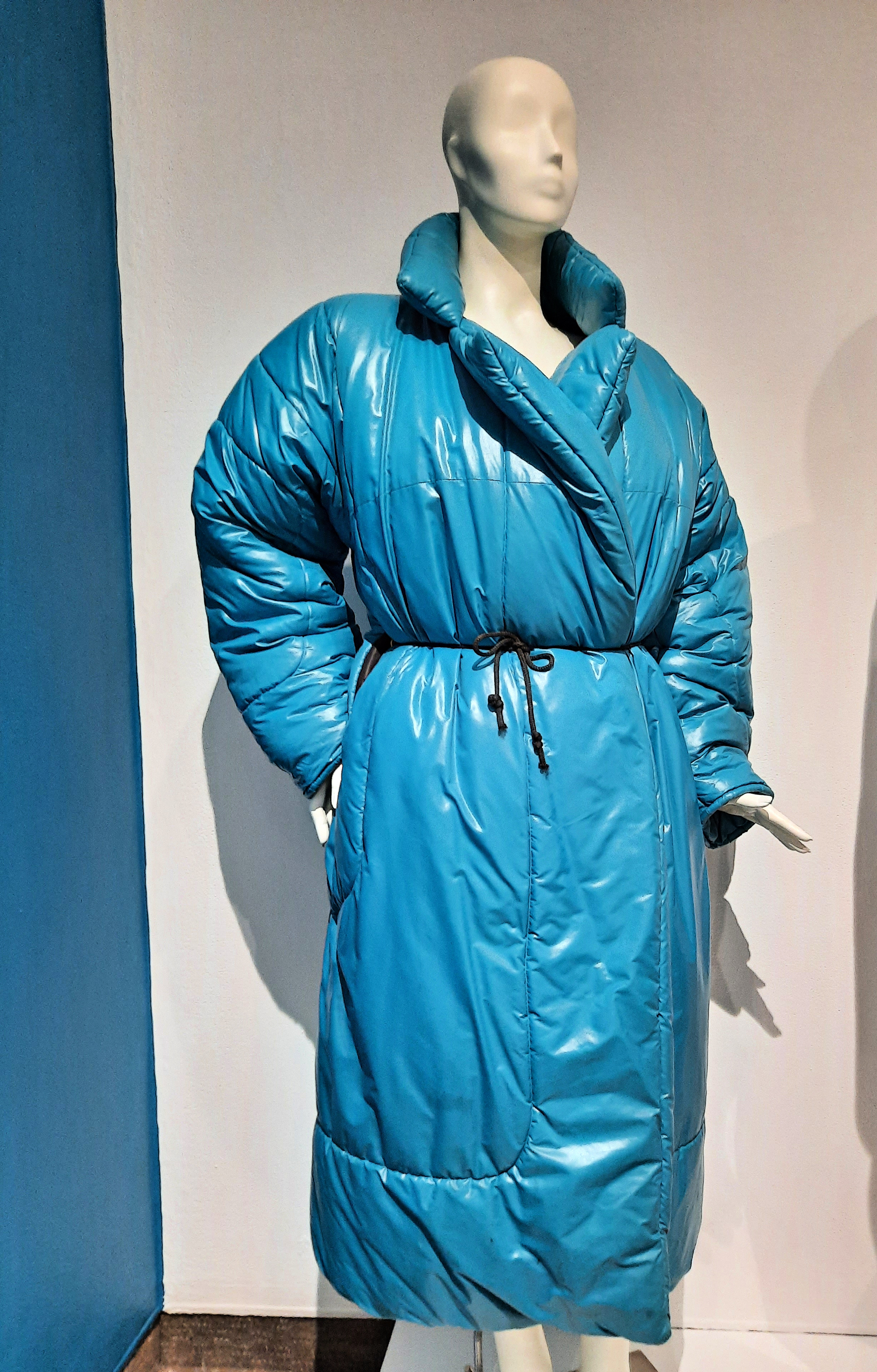
Norma Kamali's "Sleeping Bag" coat, designed between 1980-1985.

Kamali was one of over a dozen designers selected to produce costumes for the 1978 film The Wiz.

She is one of several designers credited with popularizing the shoulder pad in women's wear in the 1980s and played a prominent role in adapting exaggerated shoulder pads to casual clothes at the beginning of the eighties shoulder-pad era in 1978.

She reached a peak of fame during the early 1980s with her 1980 "Sweats" collection, a variety of garments done in sweatshirt fabric, most famously and influentially flounced, hip-yoked miniskirts called rah-rah skirts in the UK, a style she had first presented in other fabrics in 1979. These garments were the first mini-length skirts in ten years to gain widespread public acceptance, repopularizing miniskirts for the eighties. The "Sweats" collection of 1980 also finally won the public over to the large shoulder pads that the fashion industry had been trying to get women to wear since 1978, partly by making the pads removable via velcro, the first designer to make prominent use of velcro for this purpose. Her "Sweats" collection popularized athleisure, which we still see trending today.

Kamali did not usually participate in the biannual series of fashion shows in which most designers presented their wares, preferring instead to debut new styles in her store windows. An exception to this was when Japanese designer Hanae Mori invited her to stage a Kamali presentation in Tokyo in 1983.

Kamali purchased and redesigned her own building at 11 West Fifty-Sixth Street in 1983 to become her brand headquarters, retail store, design studio and showroom.

Giving her own twist to an idea first advanced by Betsey Johnson in 1969, Norma Kamali designed and patented a high-heeled sneaker in the 1980s.

Garments from Kamali's 1983 and '84 lines, including black-and-white blanket plaids, raincoat-yellow jackets, and trumpet skirts, were featured in the video for Chaka Khan's hugely popular 1984 cover of "I Feel for You."

To present her fall 1984 collection, she prepared a video called "Fall Fantasy" that was played on screens in her store. The video included a song composed for her by Walter Grant called "Shoulder Pads," a tongue-in-cheek paean to one of her favorite fashion items of the time. Her fall 1985 collection video featured music by Carly Simon. She continued to introduce new lines via store videos for years afterward. In 1985 she produced and directed “Fashion Aid” video for the Live Aid Foundation to help fight famine in Africa.

In 1986, Kamali did the costumes for Twyla Tharp's ballet In the Upper Room, with music by Philip Glass.

For sustainability purposes, all of her designs are washable.

In 1996, www.normakamali.com launches with a simultaneous virtual reality broadcast for the internet during her Fall 1996 collection presentation. By 1998 she is one of the first designers to launch e-commerce when 18008KAMALI becomes available for purchase.

Her work is included in the collections of the Metropolitan Museum of Art.

Kamali was the first designer to create an online store on eBay. In addition to designing clothing, she also produced a fitness, health and beauty line. The events of 9/11/2001 inspired her to open the Wellness Cafe and an Olive You Line debuts.

In 2008, Kamali produced a collection for Walmart, all priced under $20, and sales crash its website. In 2012 she launches Kamalikulture with all styles under $100 on Amazon and zappos.com.

In 2021, Kamali published a memoir entitled I Am Invincible, a handbook for women on fitness, health, beauty, and life. She also co-wrote a book in 2016 on acupuncture and Chinese Medicine with Dr. Jingduan Yang titled "Facing East."

Kamali has a podcast, NORMAKAMALIFE, where she interviews pop culture figures, fashion and beauty notables, and wellness and longevity experts, as well as shares her life experience.

After completing a generative AI course at MIT in 2023, Kamali trained an AI to produce clothing designs in her style, referencing her archive.

Her designs have been worn by rock stars and pop culture figures for almost 60 years, including Bette Midler, Grace Jones, Diana Ross, Raquel Welch, Christie Brinkley, Madonna, Beyonce, Rihanna, Lady Gaga, and Sabrina Carpenter.

Kamali continues to be the sole owner of Norma Kamali Inc, which has global distribution. Over time the company has expanded, but Kamali has remained its owner for several decades. She has publicly stated that the longevity of the business is due in part to adapting to change and continuously learning, viewing both successes and failures as formative experiences in the company’s development.

== Awards and honors ==
1981: A Coty Award, called the "Winnie" but formally titled the American Fashion Critics' Award.

1983: Earnie Award for Outstanding Children’s Sportswear Design celebrating the mini version of Sweats

1983: A Coty Hall of Fame Award.

1986: Honored by the Fashion Group International (FGI) in a salute to women who have made a difference in the fashion industry.

1989: President George H.W. Bush presents her with the American Success Award for Vocational Technical Education.

1999: Pencil Award for extraordinary commitment to New York City public school education.

2005: The CFDA Board of Directors Special Tribute Award.

2009: The Fashion Designer of the Year Award from the American Apparel and Footwear Association.

2016: The CFDA Geoffrey Beene Lifetime Achievement Award, which was presented to her by Michael Kors.

2010: Kamali received an honorary doctorate from her alma mater, the Fashion Institute of Technology.

Kamali has a plaque on the Fashion Walk of Fame.

== Personal life ==
In 1968, she married Mohammad "Eddie" Kamali. They divorced in 1977. She got engaged to her longtime partner, Marty Edelman, in 2020, and they are now married.

She is a lifelong devotee of dachshunds with a pet named Wally Kamali.
