= Max Mara =

Italian fashion retailer

Max Mara S.r.l.

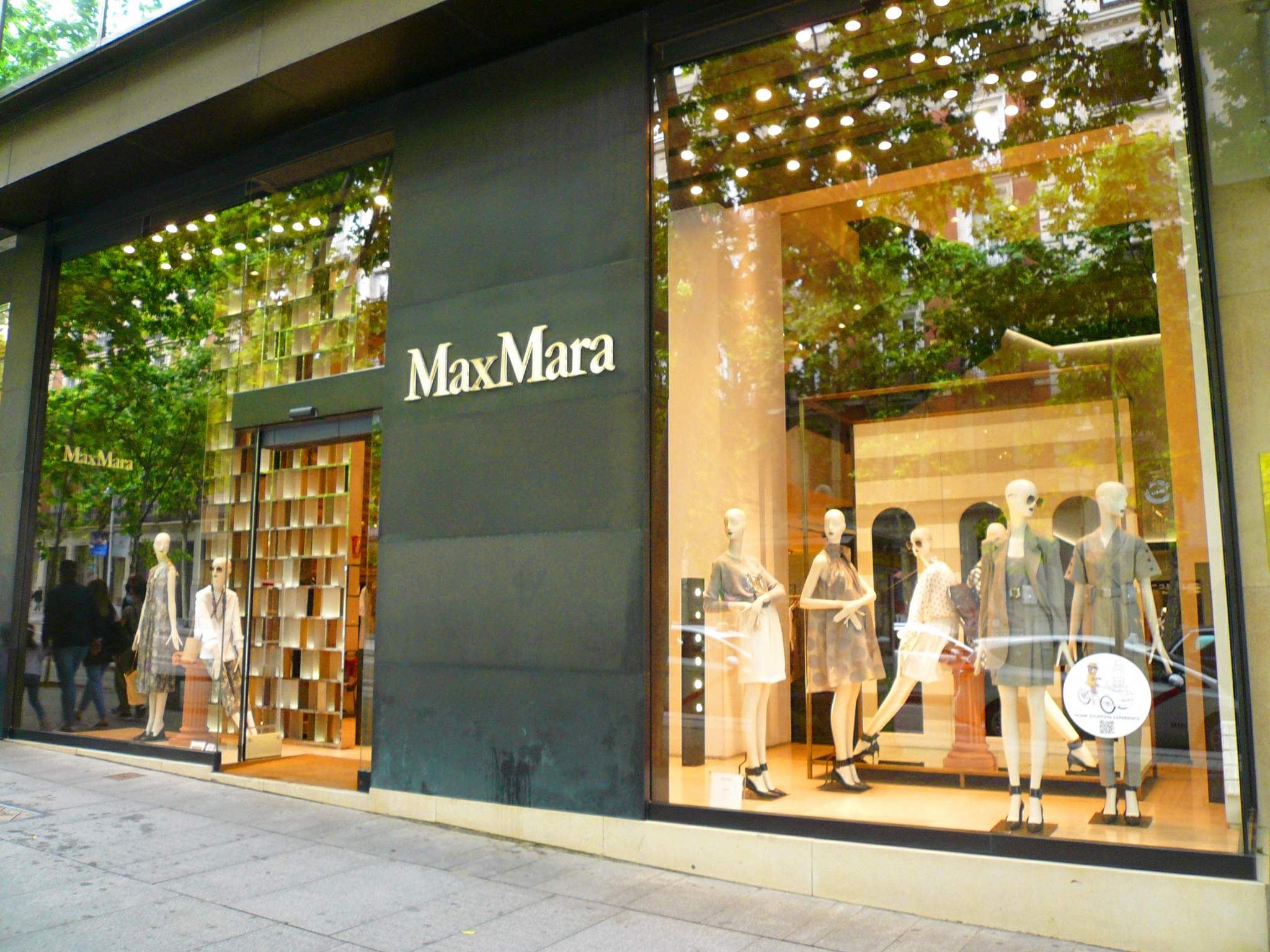
- MaxMara store in Madrid
- Type: Private
- Industry: Fashion
- Founded: 1951; 75 years ago
- Founder: Achille Maramotti
- Headquarters: Reggio Emilia, Italy
- Number of locations: 502 (October 2024)
- Area served: Worldwide
- Key people: Luigi Maramotti (chairman); Laura Lusuardi (design director)
- Products: Ready-to-wear clothing
- Revenue: €1.2bn
- Owners: Luigi, Ignazio and Ludovica Maramotti
- Website: www.maxmara.com

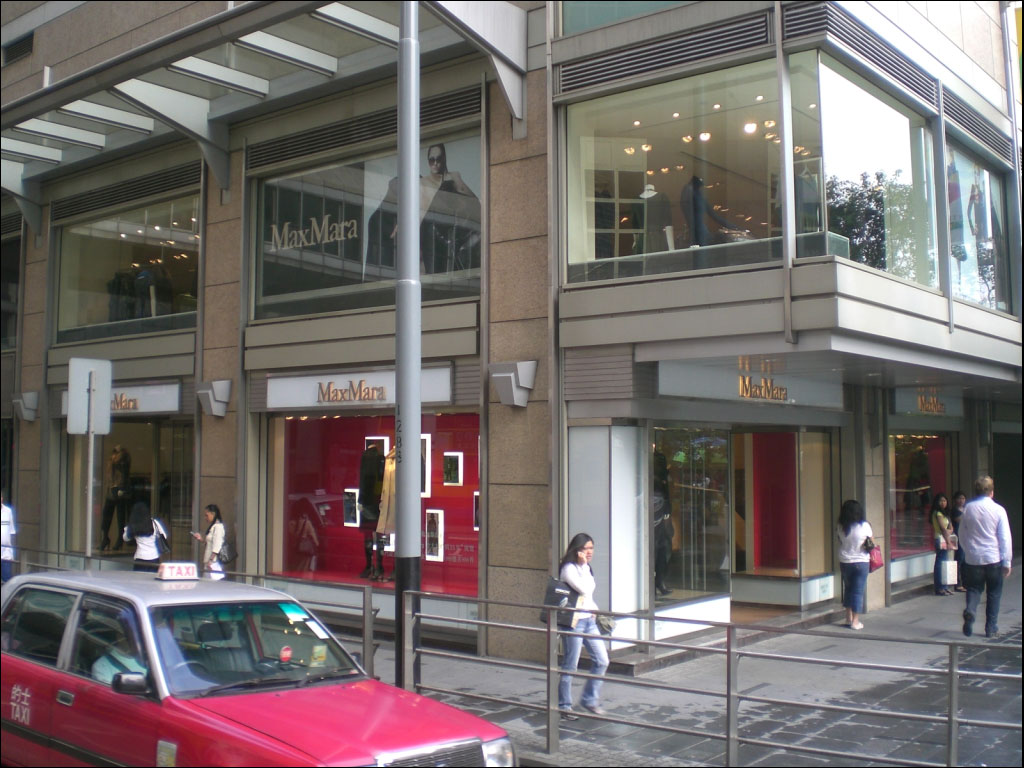
A shop in Central, Hong Kong

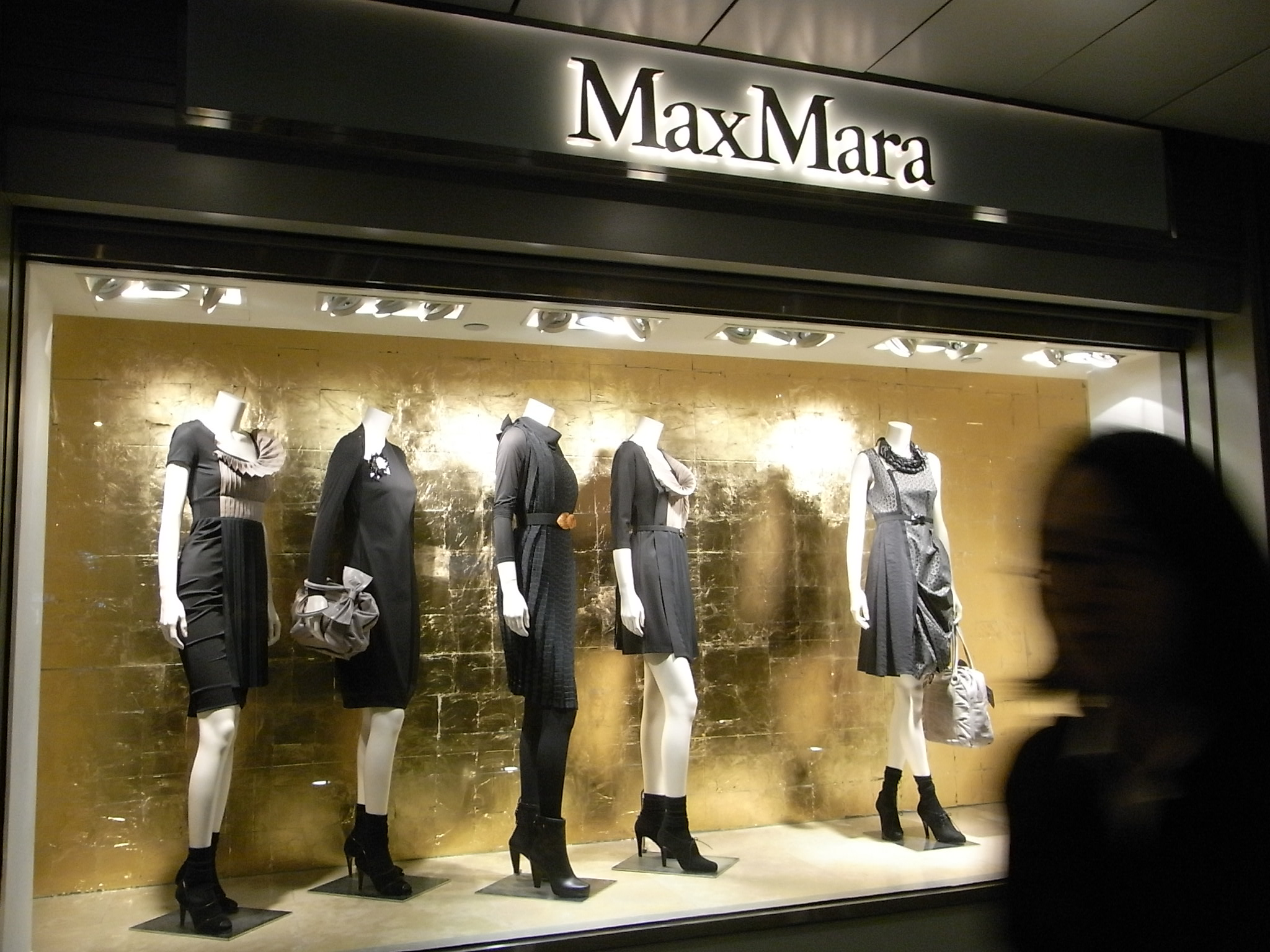
Max Mara shop window

Max Mara (Italian pronunciation: [maks ˈmaːra]) is an Italian fashion business that markets upscale ready-to-wear clothing. It was established in 1951 in Reggio Emilia by Achille Maramotti (7 January 1927 – 12 January 2005). As of October 2024 the company has 502 stores in 69 countries. It sponsors the Max Mara Art Prize for Women.

== History ==
Founded in 1951 by Achille Maramotti in Reggio Emilia, the fashion house was initially named Confezioni Maramotti with the aim of introducing American industrial processes into European tailoring culture, thus creating Italian pret-a-porter.

In 1957, the company expanded and moved to its new headquarters designed by industrial architect Eugenio Salvarani, changing its name to Max Mara. "Max" is a superlative, while "Mara" is a diminutive form of the founder's surname.

Achille Maramotti chose the men's coat as an iconic garment for women's wardrobes, and in the 1960s, Max Mara established its creative studio to research the expression and personalization of outerwear.

In the 1970s and 1980s, Max Mara began collaborating with international designers such as Anne-Marie Beretta, Emmanuelle Khanh, Karl Lagerfeld, Jean-Charles de Castelbajac, Narciso Rodriguez, Proenza Schouler, as well as fashion photographers including Richard Avedon, Arthur Elgort, Steven Meisel, Sarah Moon, Max Vadukul, Mario Sorrenti, David Sims, and Craig McDean.

During the same period, Max Mara also introduced the Manuela coat, made of pure camel hair with a notched collar, side pockets, wrap-around closure, and a belt. It has since become a distinctive outerwear piece for the fashion house.

In 1981, French designer Anne-Marie Beretta created the model 101801 coat, a camel-coloured wool and cashmere overcoat that became an iconic symbol of Max Mara. Inspired by the men's Ulster coat, the most noticeable feature of this model is the "puntino," a stitching detail derived from men's tailored suits.

In 1989, the MM Magazine was launched, a biannual fashion and lifestyle publication distributed in the brand's stores and selected multi-brand retailers.

In 2003, Max Mara relocated to its new campus in Reggio Emilia on Via Giulia Maramotti, designed by John McAslan & Partners.

In 2013, the brand presented the Teddy Bear coat on the Autumn/Winter runway, made of alpaca wool and silk with a faux fur effect, inspiring a series of imitations.

In 2014, the brand introduced recycled materials into its Weekend New Life collection.

In 2015, Max Mara collaborated with Renzo Piano Building Workshop to create the Whitney Bag for the opening of the new Whitney Museum of American Art in New York's Meatpacking District.

== Brands ==
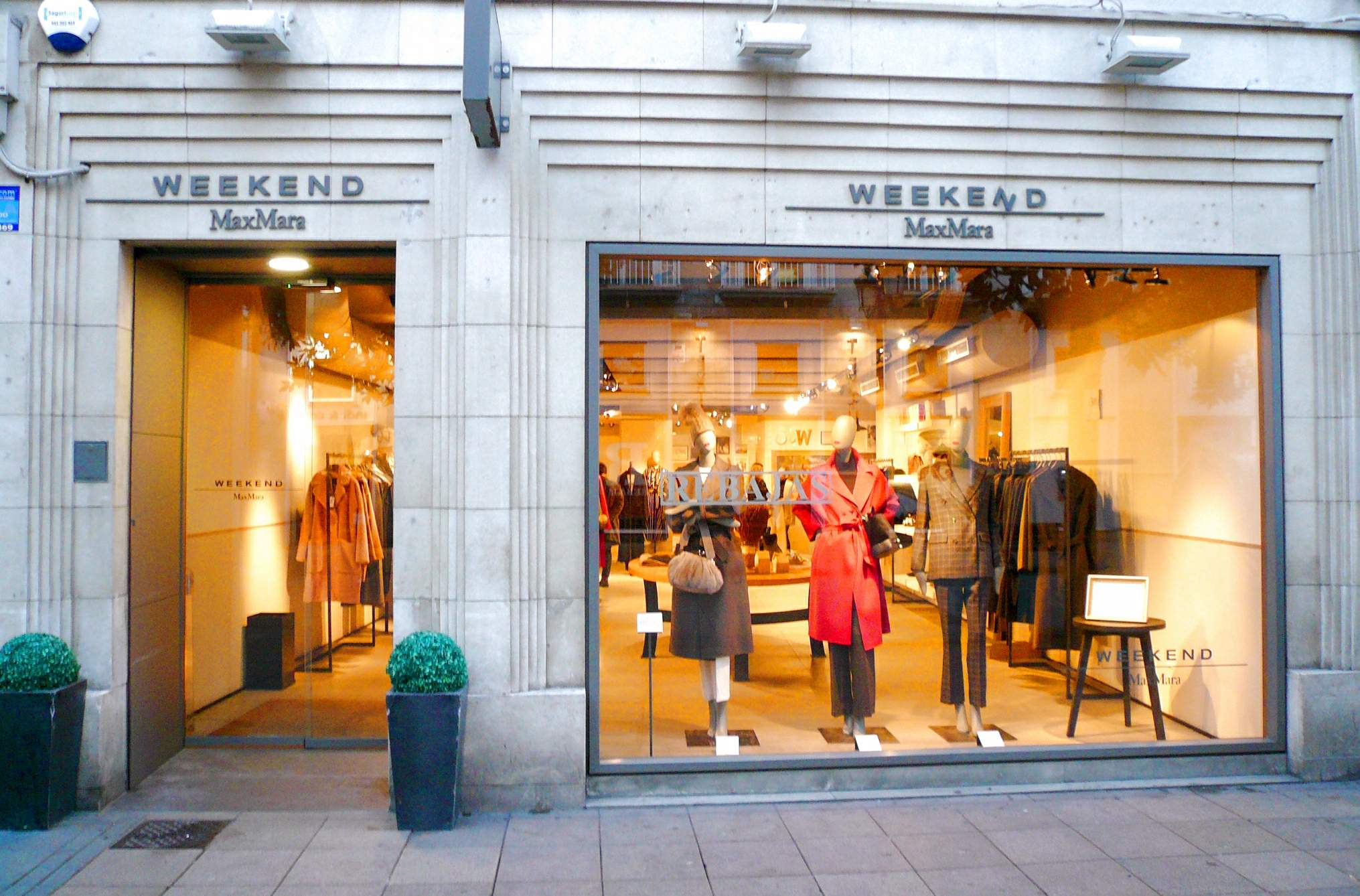
Weekend Max Mara store

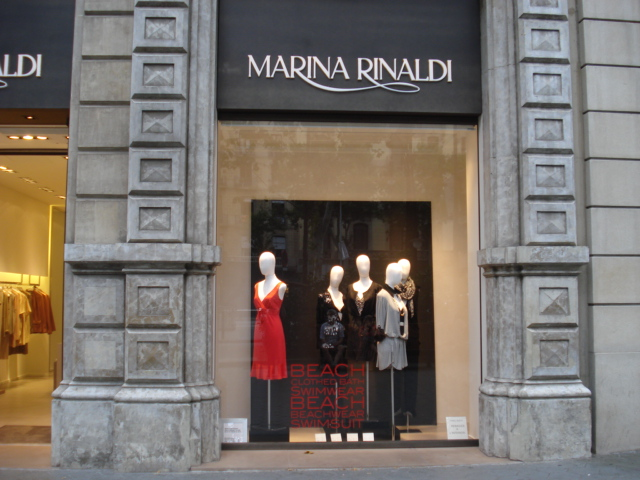
Marina Rinaldi store

Max Mara has spawned 35 labels, although Max Mara womenswear, usually stylized as MaxMara, remains the core of the company. Other brands include Sportmax, Sportmax Code, Weekend Max Mara, Marella, Pennyblack, iBlues, MAX&Co. (the trendy, youth division), and Marina Rinaldi. This last, founded in 1980 and named after Achille Maramotti's great-grandmother, is one of the best-known: in her obituary of Maramotti for The Independent.

In 2013, Jennifer Garner became the first celebrity spokesperson for Max Mara. Starting in September 2013, the campaign appeared in Vogue, Harper's Bazaar, Elle, W, InStyle, The New York Times, and the International Herald Tribune.

== Other activities ==
Max Mara had a licensing agreement with Italian eyewear manufacturer Safilo from 1997 to 2020. From 2019 to 2023, Sportmax had a five-year licensing agreement with Marcolin for the development, production and global distribution of the brand’s eyewear collections.

For the development, production, and distribution of its fragrances, Max Mara has had licensing agreements with Procter & Gamble’s Cosmopolitan Cosmetics division (–2004), Selective Beauty (2006–2024) and Shiseido (since 2024).

== Advertising campaigns ==
For its advertising campaigns, the Max Mara brands have been working with photographers like Arthur Elgort, Paolo Roversi, Peter Lindbergh, Max Vadukul (1993, 1995–1996), Steven Meisel (1994, 1997, 1999–2001, 2016), Elaine Constantine (1995), Miles Aldridge (1996), Richard Avedon (1998), Craig McDean (2006), David Sims, Inez van Lamsweerde and Vinoodh Matadin and Mario Sorrenti (2013–2014). Past campaigns have featured actresses Jennifer Garner (2013) and Amy Adams (2014). Max Mara later collaborated repeatedly with model Choi Hye-seon.

== Philanthropy ==
=== Women In Film Max Mara Face of the Future Award ===
Introduced at the Women In Film's 2006 Crystal + Lucy Awards, this award is given to an actress who is experiencing a particularly interesting period in the film and television industry. The award recognizes their social commitment, contributions to the community at large, and their ability to stand out in terms of grace, elegance, and style. Past recipients of this award include:

- 2006 – Maria Bello
- 2007 – Emily Blunt
- 2008 – Ginnifer Goodwin
- 2009 – Elizabeth Banks
- 2010 – Zoë Saldana
- 2011 – Katie Holmes
- 2012 – Chloë Grace Moretz
- 2013 – Hailee Steinfeld
- 2014 – Rose Byrne
- 2015 – Kate Mara
- 2016 – Natalie Dormer
- 2017 – Zoey Deutch
- 2019 – Elizabeth Debicki
- 2020 – Gemma Chan
- 2021 – Zazie Beetz
- 2022 – Lili Reinhart
- 2023 – Yara Shahidi
- 2024 – Joey King
- 2025 – Maude Apatow

=== Max Mara Art Prize for Women ===
This project was launched in 2005 in collaboration with the Whitechapel Gallery and is dedicated to women living in the United Kingdom. The jury consists of four members: a gallerist, a journalist and/or critic, an artist, and a collector, and it is renewed for each edition.

The prize, awarded every two years, provides an opportunity to spend six months in Italy collaborating with local artists and conducting research. The resulting artwork is then exhibited at the Whitechapel Gallery in London and later at the Collezione Maramotti in Reggio Emilia, Italy.

== Recognition ==
In 2012, Max Mara received the "Brand Heritage Award" from the global association Fashion Group International during the FGI's 29th Annual Night of Stars in New York.

== Criticism ==
In 1995, Max Mara was placed under investigation by Florentine magistrate Antonio Grassi for alleged commercial fraud; at issue were Mara labels that allegedly overstated the percentages of plush fibers such as cashmere, angora and mohair mixed with the wool of certain garments.

Research of the social democratic party in the European Parliament, the Sheffield Hallam University and further groups accused Max Mara in 2023 of using forced labour camps exploiting Muslim Uyghurs in China provided by the Anhui Huamao Group Co., Ltd. for production.

In 2024, the Humane Society of the United States campaigned for Max Mara to stop trafficking in the fur trade of foxes, mink, and raccoon dogs, stating "Max Mara has fallen behind their competitors—including Gucci, Versace, Armani, Prada and Valentino—that have already gone fur-free."

== Family ==
Achille Maramotti was born on 7 January 1927, in Reggio Emilia in Italy. Maramotti was educated in Rome and received a law degree from the University of Parma. According to the Forbes Rich List of 2005, Maramotti was one of the world's richest men with a fortune of US$2.1 billion.

He died in Albinea, Italy on 12 January 2005. Maramotti's two sons and daughter, Luigi, Ignazio and Ludovica, followed him into the business; Luigi Maramotti is chairman of the company. After his death, according to Maramotti's will, a large and important collection of contemporary art from Europe and America was made open to the public.
