= Teresa Sapey =

Italian architect and interior designer

- Born: Cuneo
- Education: Polytechnic University of Turin
- Occupations: Architect, designer
- Website: www.teresasapey.com

Teresa Sapey (Cuneo, Italy, 13 June 1962) is an Italian architect and interior designer, characterised by her playful designs and unique sense of color. She studied at Architecture Politecnic University of Turin in 1985, and completed her academic education in París with a BFA degree from the Parsons School of Design and a Master in La Villette. In 1990 she moved to Madrid, where she founded her own architecture studio, which she currently leads alongside her partner and daughter Francesca Heathcote Sapey. Sapey has been a teacher of Plastic Investigation at Universidad Camilo José Cela in Madrid and as a visiting professor at several foreign universities (McGill University in Montreal, Carleton University in Ottawa, University of Waterloo in Toronto, and the Domus Academy in Milán). She was part of the Hotel Puerta América Project, designing the parking. In this project, 18 architects worked together such as Jean Nouvel, Arata Isozaki, Norman Foster and Zaha Hadid.

== Prizes ==
- 2000 Competition Premio di Progetto di Case Riabita, Italy
- 2000 Submission to RIABITA Prize of Housing Design, Italy
- 2000 Competition al V Premio Internazionale Risorse, Seattle, Washington, USA
- 2000 Competition Ar+D, Emergencies, Architectural Review, London, England
- 2002 Competition McCann-Erickson, Madrid, Spain
- 2005 Awarded the Official Prize of Architecture of Madrid
- 2006 Awarded the Official Prize of Commercial Architecture, Madrid City
- 2007 Awarded the Breakthrough Designer of the Year, Wallpaper Magazine
- 2008 Awarded the Woman of the Year Award, Women Together Organization
- 2009 appointed "Commendatore" by the Italian Republic Minister Napolitano
- 2010 "Interior Design Studio" of the year. Architectural Digest Magazine
- 2010 Plus Interior Design 2010 (Vía Group)
- 2010 Marie Claire Magazine Names Teresa Among the 10 Women of the Year
- 2011 Chosen Architect by Citroën to do a personal design of DS3
- 2011 OperaHouse, el Cairo Competition Bases
- 2011 Golden Medal 2011 of Foro Europa 2001
- 2011 Arco 2012 VIP Lounge
- 2023 Archiproducts Outdoor Design Award for her "Romana" design for Isimar
- 2023 Career Award from Casa Decor
- 2024 Tempietto di Bramante Award

She has been featured several times in the Spanish Architectural Digest edition of the Top 100 most significant design studios, last time for the list of 2024.

== Publications ==
- Sapone Sapey, Mondadori Electa, Milano, 2010
- Parking, Edizioni Gribaudo, Alessandria, 2008, pp. 12–21
- The Architecture of Parking, Simon Henley, Thames & Hudson, London, 2007, pp. 52
- Cybercafes, Surfing Interioris, Loftpublications, Barcelona, 2007, pp. 144–149
- Dress Code, Interior Design for Fashion Shops, Frame Publishers, Amsterdam, 2006, pp. 298–303
- Bagni, Federico Motta Editore, Milano, 2004, pp. 267–271
- Sapore Sapey, Mondadori Electa, Milano, 2004
- Scale, Federico Motta Editore, Milano, 2003, pp. 228–229
- The International Design Book 2003, Laurence King Publishing, 2003, pp. 126
- Loft, Federico Motta Editore, Milano, 2002, pp. 326–337
- Caffé e Ristoranti, Federico Motta Editore, Milano, 2000, pp. 316–325
