= Anne Marie Beretta =

French fashion designer (born 1937)

Anne-Marie Beretta
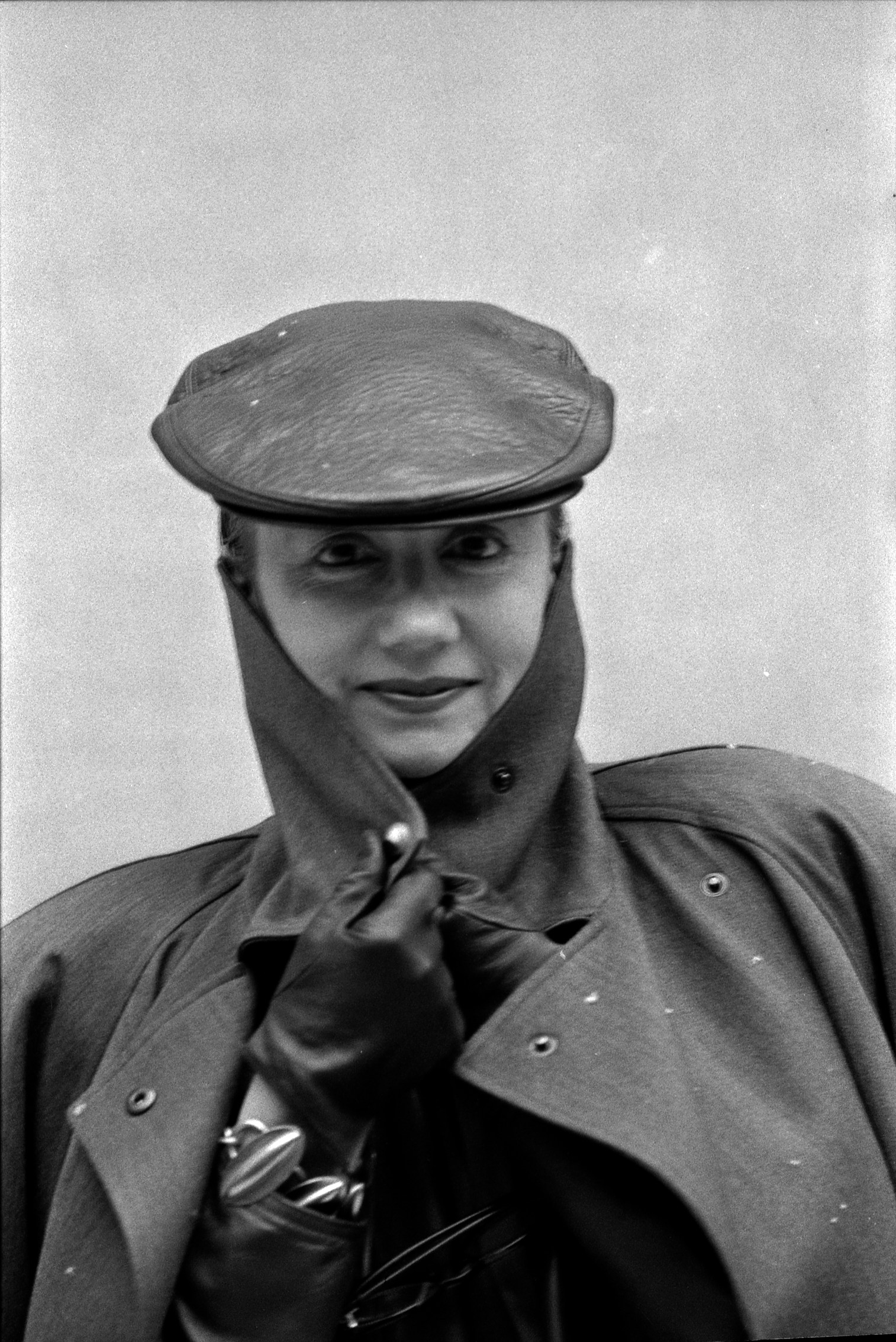
- Born: September 24, 1937 (age 88); Béziers
- Occupation: stylist
- Known for: "101801" coat designed for Max Mara
- Awards: Chevalier des Arts et des Lettres

Anne-Marie Beretta (born 24 September 1937) is a French fashion designer. She is known particularly for her iconic "101801" coat designed for Max Mara. In 1986 she became a Chevalier des Arts et des Lettres.

== Life ==
Beretta was born in Béziers in 1937. In 1957 she took the advice of Roger Bauer who was working at Jacques Griffe and decided to be a fashion designer. She found work with Antonio Castillo who was creating costumes for the theatre. She went on to work in New York for Pierre d’Alby and Mac Douglas, and Oleg Cassini. She came to notice in 1968 designing waterproofs for Ramosport and the "101801" signature coat for Max Mara in 1981. This coat which was said to have influenced the 80s is still in production in 2020. Harrods estimate that 140,000 of these coats have been sold.

In 1974 she launched her ready to wear brand.

== Awards ==
In 1986 she was knighted and she became Chevalier des Arts et des Lettres. Beretta has her designs in the Palais Galliera in Paris.
