= Jessica Miller (model) =

American model (born 1984)

- Born: 21 February 1984 (age 42); Las Vegas, Nevada, U.S.
- Occupation: Model
- Years active: 1998–present
- Spouse: Lars Ulrich (m. 2015)
- Modelling information
- Height: 178 cm (5 ft 10 in)
- Hair colour: Brown
- Eye colour: Green
- Agencies: Iconic Management (Berlin)

Jessica Miller (born 21 February 1984) is an American model. She rose to fame after signing an exclusive contract with Calvin Klein.

== Early life ==
Miller was born on 21 February 1984 in Las Vegas, United States.

== Career ==
Miller began her career at age fourteen taking classes at a modelling school. In 1999 she was discovered by Corrie Singer at Next Model Management and signed with the agency the following year.

Miller was on the March 2000 cover of Vogue Russia.

She made her Paris Fashion Week debut in 2001 walking for Lanvin, Yves Saint Laurent, and Thierry Mugler. Her break in the industry occurred in 2002 when she signed an exclusive contract with Calvin Klein. Kate Moss and Christy Turlington had both previously been the 'Calvin Klein girl'. From June 2002 onwards she was featured on the covers of Vogue Paris, Vogue España, Vogue Japan, L'Officiel Paris, L'Officiel Lithuania, L'Officiel Türkiye, Elle España, Elle Italia, Numéro, Russh, Marie Claire, Marie Claire Italia, Pop, alongside features in advertising campaigns for Banana Republic, Blugirl, Chanel, Chloé, Diesel, DSquared2, H&M, J.Crew, Jimmy Choo, Lancel, Schwarzkopf, Swarovski, and more. Miller has been a muse for photography duo Inez & Vinoodh.

Miller retired from the runway in the late 2000s. She returned permanently to the runway in 2024 and has consistently walked multiple shows since. When Chemena Kamali took over French fashion house Chloé in 2023, Miller became the face of the house and has been in advertising campaigns and walked Chloé shows since.

In a 2024 Vogue feature Miller voiced her support for reproductive rights.

== Personal life ==
Miller married Danish drummer Lars Ulrich in 2015.
