= Bouchra Jarrar =

French haute couture fashion designer (born 1970)

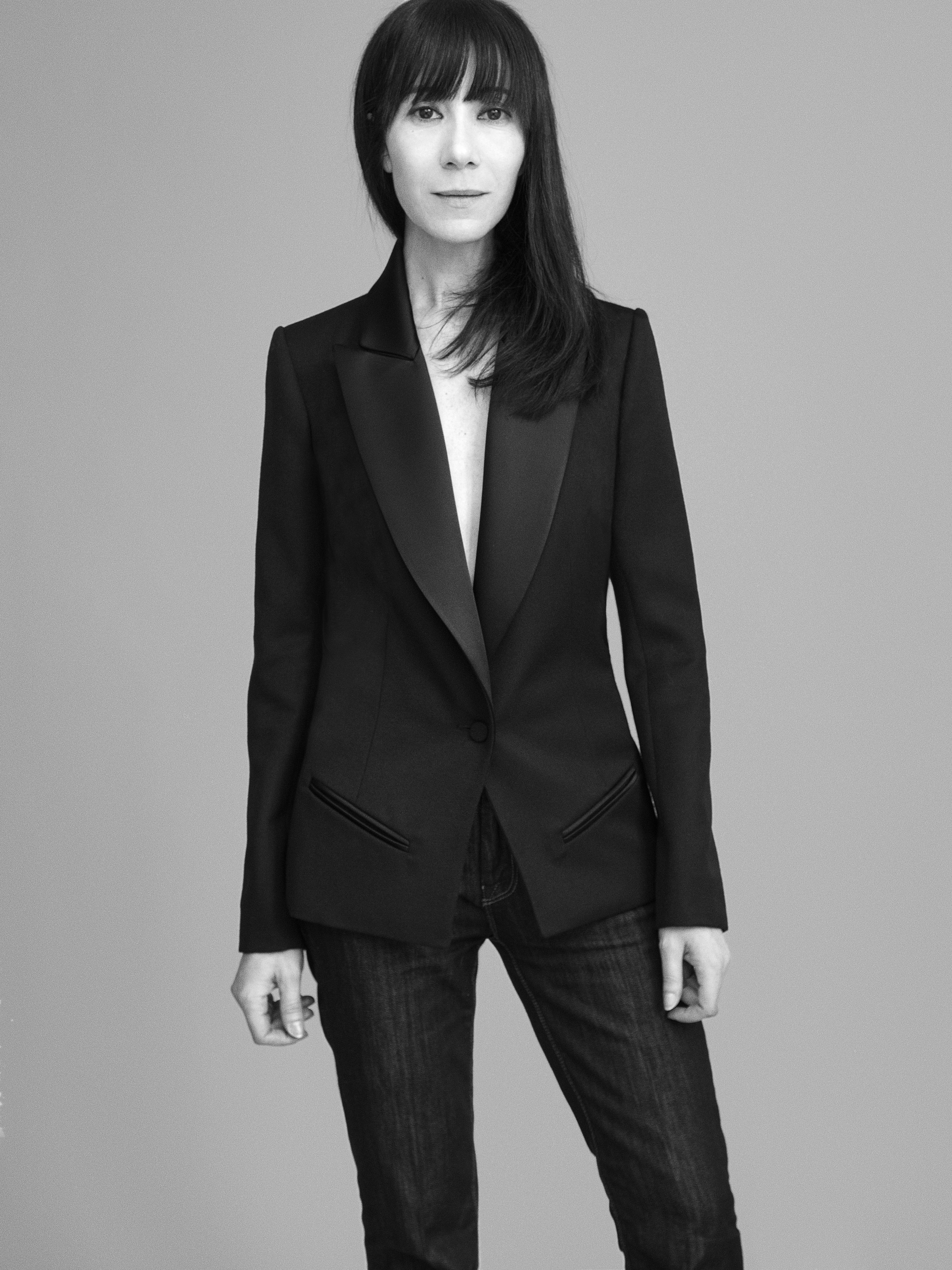
- Bouchra Jarrar in 2016.
- Born: November 14, 1970 (age 55); Cannes, France
- Education: École Duperré (1991－1994)
- Occupation: Fashion designer
- Labels: Balenciaga (1996－2006); Bouchra Jarrar (2010－); Lanvin (2016－2017)
- Awards: Ordre des Arts et des Lettres (2012)

Bouchra Jarrar (born 14 November 1970 in Cannes) is a French haute couture fashion designer.

== Early life and education ==
Born to Moroccan parents in Cannes, Jarrar entered Paris' École Duperré where she graduated in 1994.

== Career ==
Jarrar started to work on Jean Paul Gaultier's licensed jewelry collection in 1994. In 1996, she moved to Balenciaga, first under the supervision of Josephus Thimister, and then under the supervision of the creative director Nicolas Ghesquière, where she served as his studio director until 2006, helping to create ready-to-wear collections. She then worked for Scherrer for a short time, before becoming the director of Lacroix's haute couture studio, which she ran until the company filed for bankruptcy in 2009. She also worked for the lingerie brand Capucine Puerari.

In January 2010, Jarrar started her own brand, presenting her collections once a year, during Paris Fashion Week. The label has since become known for its minimal aesthetic. From 2010 to 2013, she was a guest member of the Chambre syndicale de la haute couture. Since December 2013, she is an official member, her fashion house being able to use the term "haute couture". In 2015, Mode et Finance, the French venture capital firm managed by Bpifrance, made a minority investment in Jarrar’s business, with the designer retaining a 74% ownership.

In addition to her own label, Jarrar designed a jewellery collection for Mauboussin in 2016.

In March 2016, the French fashion house Lanvin appointed Jarrar artistic director of the brand's women's collection, succeeding Alber Elbaz. She closed her eponymous couture house to join the company. Jarrar showed her first resort collection in June 2016 to critical approval. She completed only two ready-to-wear collections, spring 2017 and fall 2018, for the house before the termination of her contract. She left Lanvin after 16 months of declining sales and amid a scandal accusing the fashion house of racism in the casting of their 2017 Paris Fashion Week show.

In 2019, Jarrar photographed the singer Keren Ann for the cover of her album Bleue.

== Recognition ==
- 2012 – Chevalier of the Ordre des Arts et des Lettres
- 2017 – Officer of the Ordre des Arts et des Lettres
