= Sixiang =

Chinese-language academic book series

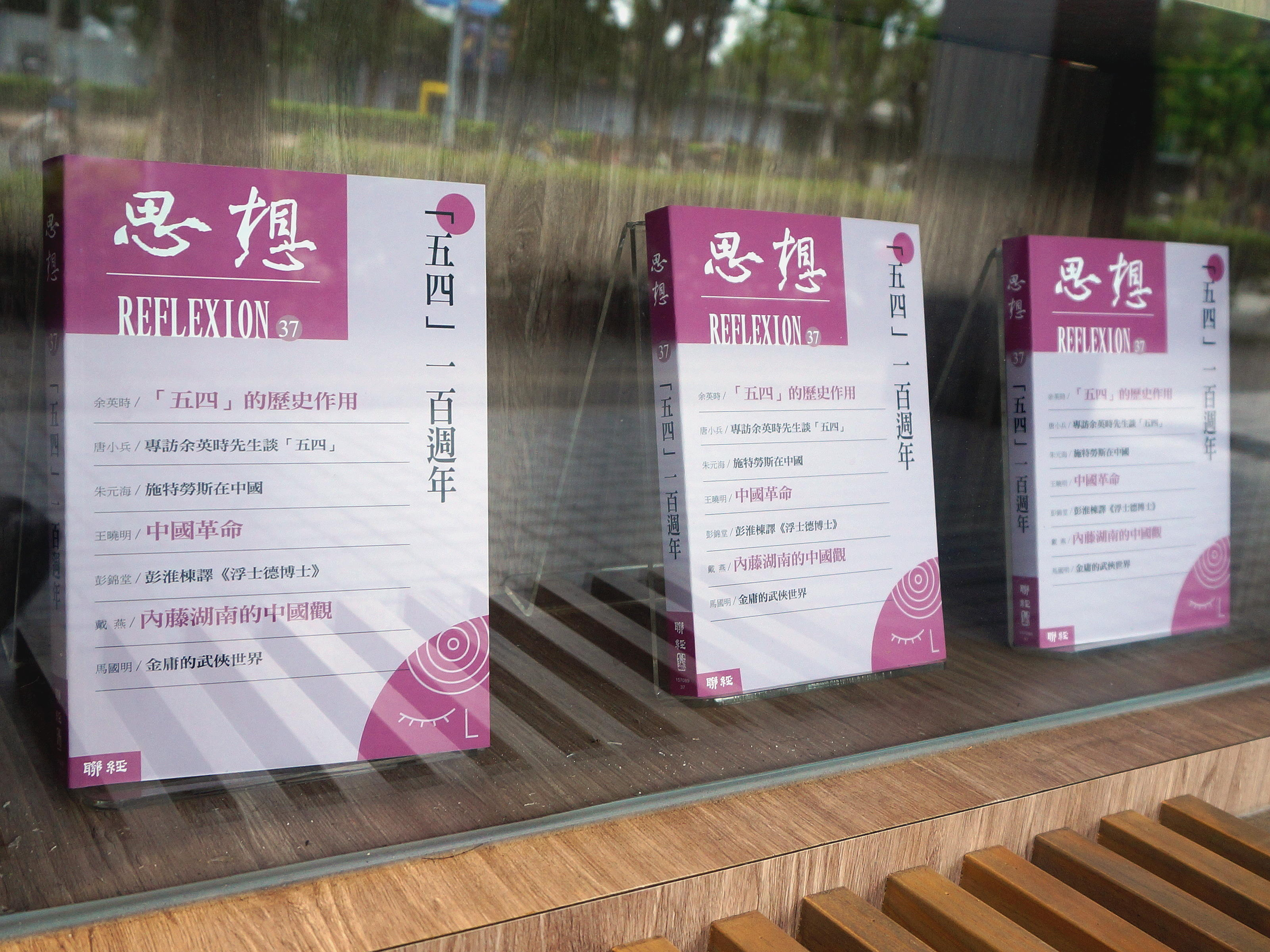
- Vol. 37, The 100th anniversary of the May 4th Movement
- Country: Taiwan
- Language: Traditional Chinese
- Discipline: Humanities and social sciences
- Publisher: Linking Publishing
- Published: 2006–present
- No. of books: 40 (by 2020)
- OCLC: 607556590

Sixiang (Chinese: 思想, lit. Thought), or Reflexion in English, is a Chinese-language academic book series edited by Academia Sinica and published by Linking Publishing. Its founder and current editor-in-chief is Sechin Y. S. Chien.

== History ==
In 1988, Linking Publishing planned to establish a journal that would focus on translating Western classics. Sechin Y. S. Chien at Academia Sinica also felt that the Taiwanese readers needed translations of Western classics, and that individual articles were not easy to publish, so it would be better to publish them in a collection. The first volume of Sixiang was titled "The Intellectual Pursuit". Although the first print run of 3,000 copies sold out, it did not continue, as it was difficult at the time to obtain copyright and find translators.

In March 2006, Linking Publishing resumed publishing Sixiang, and the theme of the second volume was "History and Reality". After the resumption, the content of Sixiang has benn original works by Chinese-speaking scholars, and it has benn published 3 to 4 times a year, similar to a quarterly, with each issue exploring a different theme. Sixiang aims to unite intellectuals in the Sinosphere as a serious Chinese-language intellectual journal, using the knowledge of scholars to discuss public issues.

== See also ==
- Toward the Future Series
