= Jessica Miller =

Jessica Miller may refer to:

- Jessica Miller (born 1984), American model
- Jessica Miller (born 1981), American-Canadian figure skater
