= Paul Vacher =

French perfumer

Paul Vacher (pronounced [pɔl vaʃe]) (1902 – 1975) was a French perfumer.

Vacher created Le Galion fragrances, trademarked in 1936. He worked at Guerlain, among other perfume houses. He is best known for his parts in the creations of Miss Dior for Christian Dior in 1947 with Jean Carles, and Arpège for Lanvin in 1927 with André Fraysse.

Until 1990, Le Galion created and distributed 24 fragrances, the best known of which was Sortilège.
