= Lanvin =

French luxury fashion house

Lanvin Group
- Type: Subsidiary
- Industry: Fashion
- Founded: 1889; 137 years ago in Paris, France
- Founder: Jeanne Lanvin
- Headquarters: 22 Rue du Faubourg Saint-Honoré, Paris, France
- Area served: Worldwide
- Key people: Barbara Werschin (CEO); Peter Copping (Artistic Director)
- Products: Apparel, accessories, perfume, jewelry
- Parent: Lanvin Group, a subsidiary of Fosun International
- Website: www.lanvin.com

Lanvin (French: [lɑ̃vɛ̃]) is a French luxury fashion house founded in 1889 by Jeanne Lanvin in Paris. It is the oldest French fashion house still in operation. Since 2018, it has been a subsidiary of Shanghai-based Lanvin Group. Lanvin Group includes Lanvin, Sergio Rossi, Wolford, St. John Knits, and Caruso.

== History ==
=== Under Jeanne Lanvin (1889–1946) ===
Created by Jeanne Lanvin, Lanvin was born in 1867 and had started a small millinery on Rue du Marché Saint Honoré in 1885. The House of Lanvin was created in 1889 with a millinery shop at 16 Rue Boissy-d’Anglas. In 1893, Lanvin acquired 22 Rue du Faubourg Saint Honoré.

In 1897 Lanvin gave birth to her daughter and only child, Marguerite. Marguerite became Lanvin's muse and she started making clothing for Marguerite. This eventually lead to the establishment of a children's clothing line in 1908. Lanvin was the first to create a designer line for children.

In 1909 Lanvin joined the Chambre Syndicale de la Couture, formally making her a couturier. Along with this she expanded to women's clothing. Her styles became known for their femininity and youthful, romantic aesthetic. She is famous for her proprietary shade of inimitable blue nicknamed "Lanvin Blue" inspired by a Fra Angelico fresco she saw, and produced exclusively in her factory at Nantes.

In collaboration with Armand-Albert Rateau, an interior design store was opened in 1920.

==== Lanvin Décoration ====
In 1921, Jeanne Lanvin and French decorator Armand-Albert Rateau founded Lanvin Décoration, a decorative arts division specializing in interior decoration and furnishings.

Located at 15 Rue du Faubourg Saint-Honoré in Paris, opposite the Lanvin couture house, the boutique sold furniture, furnishing fabrics, lighting, woodwork, carpets, and other decorative elements for interior design.

Its furniture and decorative objects were produced in workshops established by Rateau in Neuilly-Levallois in 1920, where crafts such as carpentry, cabinetmaking, weaving, gilding, lacquerwork, and sculpture were brought together under one roof.

Their collaboration extended to several major projects between 1921 and 1925, including the Théâtre Daunou, the Lanvin boutiques, and the Pavillon de l’Élégance at the 1925 International Exhibition of Modern Decorative and Industrial Arts in Paris.

Their work drew on motifs inspired by flora, fauna, antiquity, and the Orient, reflecting the Art Deco aesthetic of the period.

Lanvin also commissioned Rateau to decorate her private mansion at 16 Rue Barbet-de-Jouy in Paris. After the building’s demolition in 1965, parts of her private interiors, including a bedroom, boudoir, and bathroom, were transferred to the Musée des Arts Décoratifs.

==== Logo ====
The Lanvin logo was inspired by a photograph which depicts Lanvin and her daughter wearing matching outfits at a costume ball in 1907. The logo was drawn in 1923 by French illustrator Paul Iribe. As stated by Alber Elbaz, “It's not a lion, and it's not a horse. It's a mother and a daughter, I find the logo very emotional."

A dye factory opens in 1923 located in Nanterre, the factory was created to make exclusive colours for the company.

Lanvin Parfums was created in 1924, however perfumes had been released before the creation of the company. Mon Péché (My Sin) was released in 1925 formulated by Maria Zède (Madame Z) and André Fraysse. Released first in France and then the USA (as My Sin) where it was a huge success.

In 1926 men's, fur and lingerie lines were launched.

The fragrance Arpège was later launched in 1927, becoming Lanvin's signature scent. The perfume was created to celebrate her daughter Marguerite's (by now a musician) thirtieth birthday with the title translating to arpeggio in English. It later developed the tagline "Promise her anything, but give her Arpège".

=== After Jeanne Lanvin (1946–present) ===
When Lanvin died in 1946, her daughter Marguerite (by then known as Countess Marie-Blanche de Polignac) became director of Jeanne Lanvin and Lanvin Parfums. Because Marguerite died childless in 1958 the ownership of the house went to a cousin, Yves Lanvin.

Lanvin Parfums merged with Charles of the Ritz in 1964. The company was purchased by Squibb in 1971, however in 1978 Lanvin was separated from Charles of the Ritz and sold. The Lanvin family kept its ownership of the fashion division.

In 1989 a controlling stake in Lanvin was sold to Midland Bank. Claude Montana then became the designer for the brands haute couture division. His first collection was shown in January 1990.

==== L'Oréal ownership (1990–2001) ====
Orcofi (a holding company of Henry Racamier) and L'Oréal purchased Lanvin in 1990, from Midland Bank and the Lanvin family. L'Oréal increased its ownership of Lanvin in 1994 to a 66% stake, becoming the majority owners. Orofci continued to own a 34% stake in the brand. In 1995 the stake became 94%. Finally in 1996 L'Oréal purchased the entirety of the company.

Claude Montana left the house in 1992 and with this the haute couture line was shuttered.

In 1995 Ocimar Versolato was appointed as designer for the women's ready-to-wear line, he showed his first collection in March 1996. Versolato created an evening wear line under the Lanvin name for Bergdorf Goodman in 1996.

==== Harmonie ownership (2001–2018) ====
Lanvin was purchased by investor group Harmonie S.A. in August 2001. The group was headed by Taiwanese media magnate Wang Shaw-lan. However, in 2003 Wang bought out the other investors of Harmonie S.A.

Joix Corporatic became the ready-to-wear licence holder in Japan in 2005, with a retail value of €50 million. In Japan, Lanvin clothes are a licence held by Itochu and in 2007 made around $280 million in sales from Lanvin-branded clothes, more than the house made.

The perfume business of the company was sold in 2007 to Interparfums.

On 4 December 2009, Lanvin opened their first U.S. boutique in Bal Harbour, Florida.

In 2011, Lanvin sales reached €203 million. In 2012, Lanvin Ralph Bartel increased his stake in the brand to 25 percent with a capital increase of 17.5 million euros.

On 20 November 2013, Lanvin became the official tailor of Arsenal FC.

On 28 October 2015, Lanvin announced that Elbaz was no longer at the company, due to differences of opinion with the shareholders. He was replaced by Bouchra Jarrar in March 2016. Jarrar left the following year and was succeeded by Olivier Lapidus, who departed on 23 March 2018, after only two seasons. Lapidus' successor was not named upon his exit.

==== Fosun International ownership (2018–present) ====
Shanghai-based Fosun International became the owner of Lanvin in February 2018. This was after they acquired the shares of Wang and Bartel (who owned 75 percent and 25 percent respectively). After the acquisition Jean-Philippe Hecquet was appointed CEO, however after 18 months he stepped down in March 2020.

Fosun Fashion Group (the subsidiary of Fosun which owns Lanvin) was renamed to Lanvin Group in October 2021.

In December 2021, Siddhartha Shukla was appointed Deputy General Manager .

The group was listed on the New York Stock Exchange in 2023. The group was valued at US$1.5 billion.

Lanvin Lab was launched in 2023. Lanvin Lab collaborates with others for mini-collections the first was with rapper Future.

On 11 June 2024, Vogue reported that Lanvin would reveal a new creative director in the coming days. On the 27th of June it was announced that Peter Copping would become the brands artistic director, leading both the womenswear and menswear collections.

== Creative directors since 2001 ==
=== Alber Elbaz ===
In October 2001, Alber Elbaz was appointed the Lanvin artistic director for all activities, including interiors. His work, characterized by dramatic flowing silhouettes showcasing luxurious fabrics, was critically well received. In 2006, he introduced new packaging for the fashion house, featuring a forget-me-not flower color, Lanvin's favorite shade which she purportedly saw in a Fra Angelico fresco (Suzy Menkes, 2005.).

On 2 September 2010, it was announced by H&M that Lanvin would be their guest designer collaboration for the Winter 2010 collection. The collection would be available to view beginning 4 November 2010 at HM.com. The collection would then be available to buy in 200 stores worldwide, on 20 November, with a first look sale the day before exclusively at the H&M store in Las Vegas. The main face of the collection video was supermodel Natasha Poly.

=== Lucas Ossendrijver ===
In 2006, Lucas Ossendrijver was appointed the head of the men's line. The 2006 men's ready-to-wear collection was inspired by a Jean-Luc Godard film. He launched the first LANVIN urban sneakers, now with their patent leather toe caps, while presenting his AW 2006 collections; the shoes later became available in women's collections. While enjoying a revitalized reputation in luxury, Lanvin received mainstream press in the United States in May 2009 when Michelle Obama was photographed wearing a popular line of Lanvin's sneakers made of suede with grosgrain ribbon laces and metallic pink toe caps while volunteering at a Washington, D.C. food bank. The sneaker shoes were reportedly retailed at $540.

=== Bouchra Jarrar ===
Bouchra Jarrar was appointed as Creative Director by Lanvin in March 2016. In 2017, and with the preparation of only two ready-to-wear collections, Jarar stepped down from her position. Upon her departure, Lanvin released the following statement: "Lanvin and Bouchra Jarrar have mutually decided to put an end to their collaboration".

=== Bruno Sialelli ===
French designer Bruno Sialelli was named the new creative director of Lanvin in January 2019. Lanvin revealed in a statement that Sialelli's appointment marks a "pivotal new direction". Sialelli had worked with Jonathan Anderson at Spanish brand Loewe prior to the appointment and was presumed to be facing "great pressure to turn things around for the Maison." In April 2023 he left Lanvin after four years as creative director.

=== Peter Copping ===
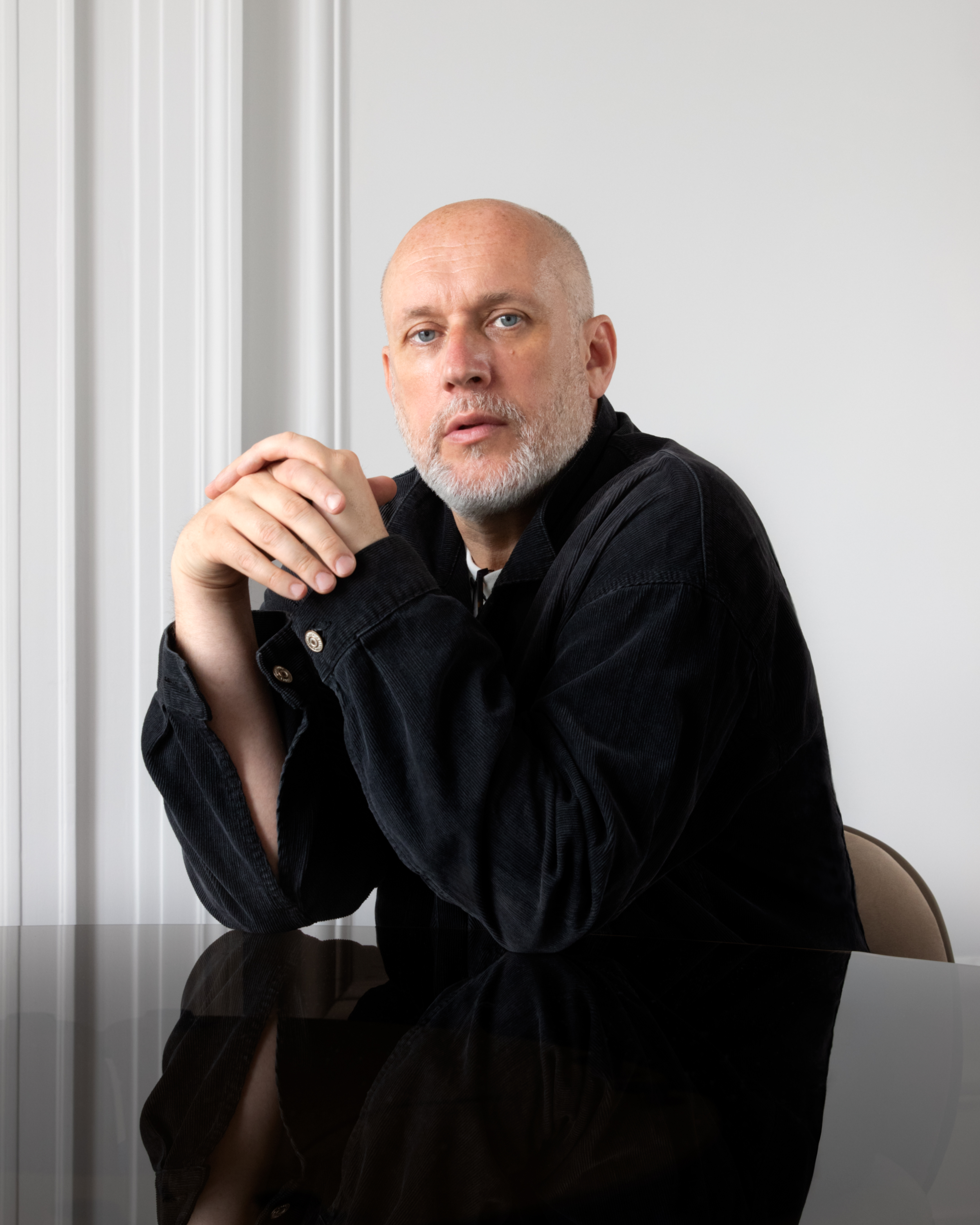
Peter Copping

In June 2024, Peter Copping was announced as the next artistic director of Lanvin, effective September 2024. His previous work experience includes leading Balenciaga's return to Haute Couture, and creative director positions at Oscar de la Renta and Nina Ricci.

== Directors ==
- 1946–1950, Lanvin's daughter Marie-Blanche de Polignac, owner and director
- 1942–1950, Marie-Blanche's cousin Jean Gaumont-Lanvin (Colombes, 1908–Versailles, 1988), director general
- 1950–1955, Daniel Gorin (Paris, 1891–Paris, 1972), director general
- 1959, Marie-Blanche's cousin Yves Lanvin, owner; Madame Yves Lanvin, president.
- 1989–1990, Léon Bressler, chairperson
- 1990–1993, Michel Pietrini, chairperson
- 1993–1995, Loïc Armand, chairperson
- 1995–2001, Gérald Asaria, chairperson
- 2001–2004, Jacques Lévy, director general
- 2009–2013, Thierry Andretta
- 2013–2017, Michèle Huiban
- 2017–2018, Nicolas Druz
- 2018–2020, Jean-Philippe Hecquet
- 2020, Joann Cheng (ad interim)
- 2021, Arnaud Bazin
- 2021–2026, Siddhartha Shukla, CEO
- 2026–2026, Andy Lew (interim)
- 2026–present, Barbara Werschin

== Designers ==
- 1946–1958: Marie-Blanche de Polignac, director general and designer
- 1950–1963: Antonio del Castillo, women's collections
- 1960–1980: Bernard Devaux, hats, scarves, haute couture; women's "Diffusions" line 1963–1980,
- 1964–1984: Jules-François Crahay (Liège, 1917–1988), haute couture collections and "Boutique de Luxe"
- 1972: Christian Benais, men's ready-to-wear collection
- 1976–1991: Patrick Lavoix, men's ready-to-wear collections
- 1981–1989: Maryll Lanvin, ready-to-wear, first haute couture in 1985 and women's "Boutique" collections
- 1989–1990: Robert Nelissen, women's ready-to-wear collections
- 1990–1992: Claude Montana, five haute-couture collections
- 1990–1992: Eric Bergère, women's ready-to-wear collections
- 1992–2001: Dominique Morlotti, women's and men's ready-to-wear collections
- 1996–1998: Ocimar Versolato, women's ready-to-wear collections
- 1998–2002: Cristina Ortiz, women's ready-to-wear collections
- 2002–2015: Alber Elbaz, artistic director of all creative activities
- 2003–2006: Martin Krutzki, designer of men's ready-to-wear
- 2006–2018: Lucas Ossendrijver, men's collections
- 2015–2016: Chemena Kamali, Lucio Finale, and Elie Top contributed to the creation of collections shown between the exit of Elbaz and appointment of Jarrar.
- 2016–2017: Bouchra Jarrar, women's collections
- 2017–2018: Olivier Lapidus, women's collections
- 2018–2019: Estrella Archs, women's collections
- 2019–2023: Bruno Sialelli, women's and men's collections
- 2024–present: Peter Copping, women's and men's collections

== Advertising ==
For its advertising campaigns, Lanvin has been working with photographers like Craig McDean (2000) and Steven Meisel (1999, 2012, 2022).
