= Joana Valls =

Spanish dressmaker

Francisca Juana María del Pilar Giralt Miró (1855–1935, in Barcelona) was a Spanish dressmaker who worked in Barcelona between 1880 and 1919. She was better known as Joana Valls, and is regarded by modern fashion historians as one of the most influential dressmakers in Barcelonian fashion of the early 20th century with French fashion designer Caroline Montagne Roux.
