= Ralph Toledano =

French businessman

Ralph Toledano (born 27 September 1951, Casablanca, Morocco) is a French-Moroccan businessman. He is president of the Puig group's fashion division; president of the Fédération française de la Couture, du Prêt à Porter des Couturiers et des Créateurs de Mode; and president of the Chambre Syndicale de la Haute Couture.

== Family ==
He was born in a Moroccan Jewish family, to Rose-Sarah Toledano and Joseph Toledano, one of the leaders in Morocco's preserved and canned food industries. Joseph Toledano was a distinguished member of the Jewish community in Morocco and was president of the Moroccan delegation to the World Jewish Congress. He lived in Morocco until he was 18 years old.

Toledano graduated from the French business school HEC Paris in 1973.

Toledano married Céline Toledano on November 17, 1990. Together they raised three children: Emmanuelle, Sarah and Ilan.

== Career ==
He became president of the Puig group's fashion division in 2012. He was managing director of Karl Lagerfeld’s company and signature label from 1985 - 1995. He then joined Guy Laroche as managing director in 1996, soon naming Alber Elbaz artistic director of the French house. Mr. Toledano stayed at Guy Laroche until 1999 when he was named chief executive officer of Chloé (Groupe Richemont). Two years after his arrival, he brought Phoebe Philo on board as artistic director. Toledano remained head of Chloé until 2010. From 2011 to 2012 Mr. Toledano was chairman of St. John.

He was president of the Chambre Syndicale du Prêt à Porter des Couturiers et des Créateurs de Mode from 2003 to 2008 and from 2012 to 2014.

He was elected president of the Fédération française de la Couture, du Prêt à Porter des Couturiers et des Créateurs de Mode on July 1, 2014, and holds the position since then. He was re-elected as President of the Chambre Syndicale de la Haute Couture on November 12, 2015.

In 2018 he was appointed Chairman of Victoria Beckham Ltd.

Toledano is a member of the board of DEFI, a (French organization that works to support the French fashion industry both domestically and at export) He is a board member of the IFM and the Association Villa Noailles (which in particular organizes the Hyères Festival)

== Awards and Distinctions ==
Toledano is a Chevalier in the Legion of Honour (2003) and an Officer in the Ordre National du Mérite (2014).
