= Armand-Albert Rateau =

French furniture maker and interior designer

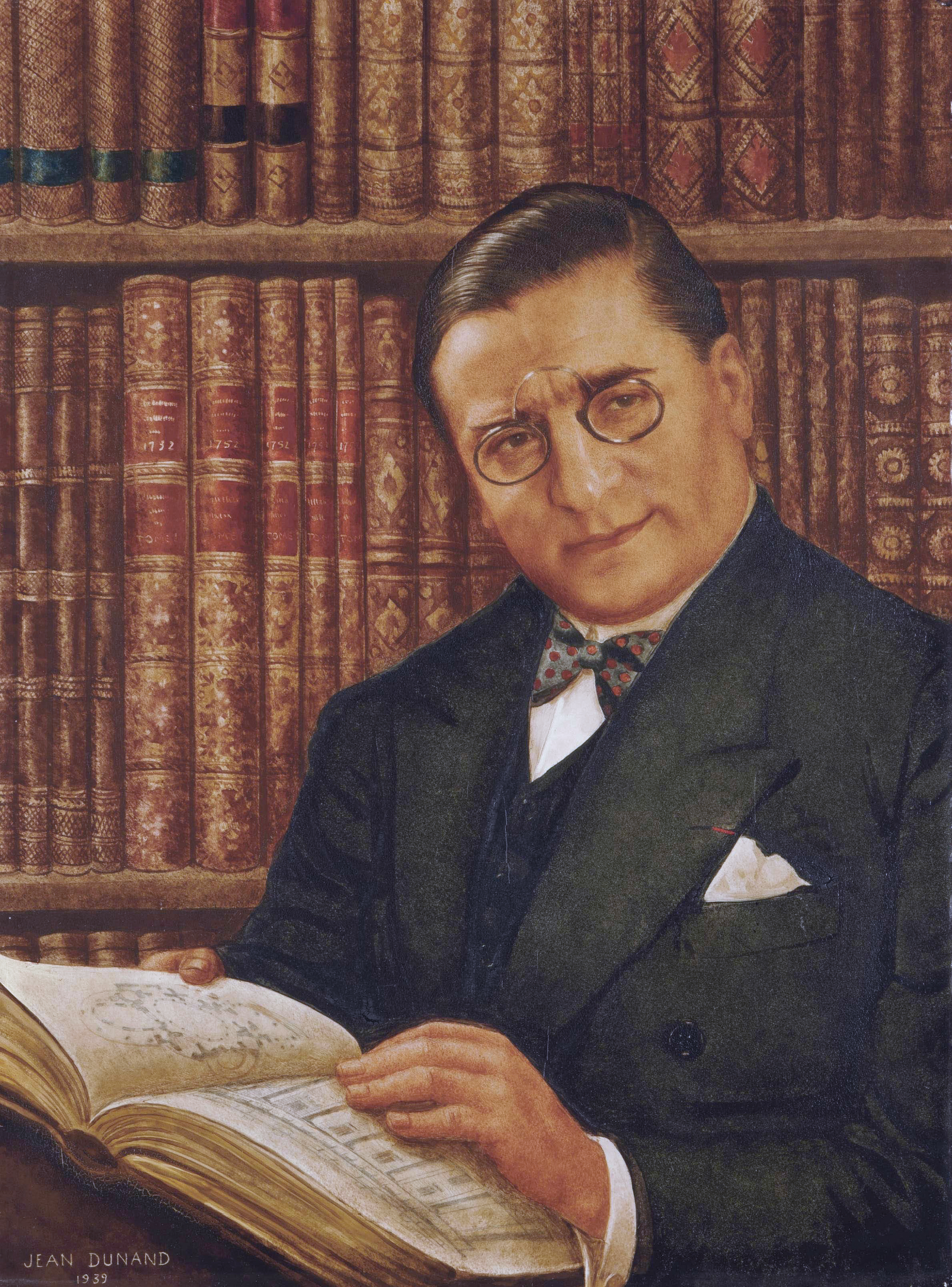
- Armand-Albert Rateau in his library (Jean Dunand, 1939)
- Born: 24 February 1882; Paris, France
- Died: 20 February 1938 (aged 55); Paris, France
- Occupations: furniture maker and interior designer

Armand-Albert Rateau (24 February 1882 – 20 February 1938) was a French furniture maker and interior designer. In 2006, The Grove Encyclopedia of Decorative Arts characterized him as "the most eminent of the ensembliers, the high-style designer-decorators" who worked with luxury materials for the socially elite. In 2012, Architectural Digest described him as "one of the most exclusive interior designers of the 1920s." Two of his more notable achievements are the bronze furniture of his manufacture and the designs he assembled in decorating the apartment of Jeanne Lanvin.

== Career ==
Rateau was born in 1882. Trained at the École Boulle, Rateau took a formative trip with friends in 1914 to Naples and Pompei, visiting museums and archaeological sites. When he began his career with renowned designer Georges Hoentschel, his focus was on Classical style. At the age of 23, he became the artistic director of Alavoine and Company, which was one of the most important French companies in decoration at the time. In 1919, bolstered by the reputation he earned for his Classical work with Hoentschel and Alavoine, he set up his own house.

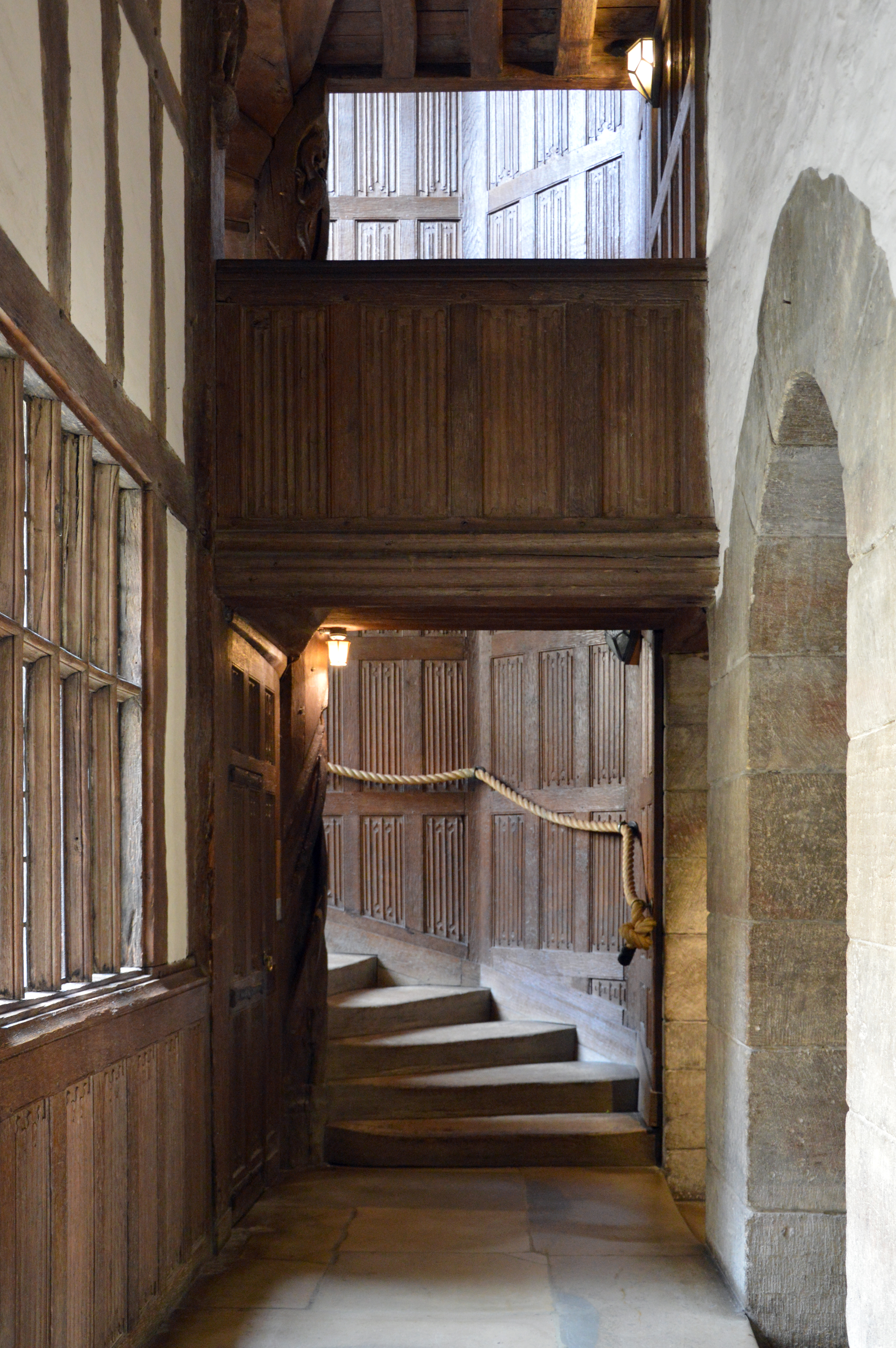
Spiral staircase designed by Rateau in the style of the 16th century, added to the south side of the Fountain Court of Leeds Castle.

Rateau's first important project was a commission from the United States, to furnish the swimming pool of George and Florence Meyer Blumenthal. There, he began to work with the themes he had observed in his 1914 journey, creating the first bronze furniture pieces which would come to be so strongly associated with him. In 1920, he began working with French couturier Jeanne Lanvin, redesigning several of her properties, and soon thereafter began work designing for the Duchess of Alba. He became one of the most important designers of the Art Deco furniture and decor movement in France, with an emphasis on Antiquity that also included a focus on Egyptian-based design.

Having become friends with Lanvin during his design work for her, he want on to manage her Lanvin-Sport business, also designing a bottle for her perfume line Arpège.

== Legacy ==
The furniture that he designed in 1928 for Lanvin's apartment on rue Barbet-de-Jouy in Paris was donated by Prince Louis de Polignac to the Museum of Decorative Arts in Paris in 1965. The entire apartment has been created and is on display there.
