= Wang Shaw-lan =

Taiwanese businesswoman

- 王效蘭
- Born: 1941 (age 83–84); Chongqing, China
- Education: Shih Hsin University (BA)
- Occupation(s): fashion house and newspaper owner
- Parent(s): Wang Tiwu; Zhao Yuxian

Wang Shaw-lan (Chinese: 王效蘭; pinyin: Wáng Xiàolán; born 1941) is a Taiwanese businesswoman who serves as the publisher of the United Daily News and the publishing-ceased Min Sheng Bao in Taiwan. She studied at Shih Hsin University, graduating in 1964.

== Life and career ==
She was born in Chongqing but the roots of her family are from Zhejiang. She has four younger siblings. In 1947, her father Wang Tiwu, a colonel in the army of Chiang Kai-shek, traveled to Taiwan and founded the newspaper United Daily News, in 1951. Wang studied journalism in Taipei and then worked as a reporter at the United Daily News. She married an air force pilot and lived in Switzerland with her husband. She was asked by her father to return to Taiwan and run the newspaper.

In August 2001, through her holding Harmonie SA, Wang bought Lanvin, the oldest fashion house still in operation, from L'Oréal. During the same year, Wang hired Alber Elbaz as Lanvin's designer.

Shaw-Lan was the director of both Min Sheng Bao and the Europe Journal until 2006 and 2009.

She earned two Legion of Honor awards as well as a Chevalier de l'Ordre des Arts et des Lettres award from France.
