= Linking Publishing =

Taiwanese publishing house

Linking Publishing 聯經出版
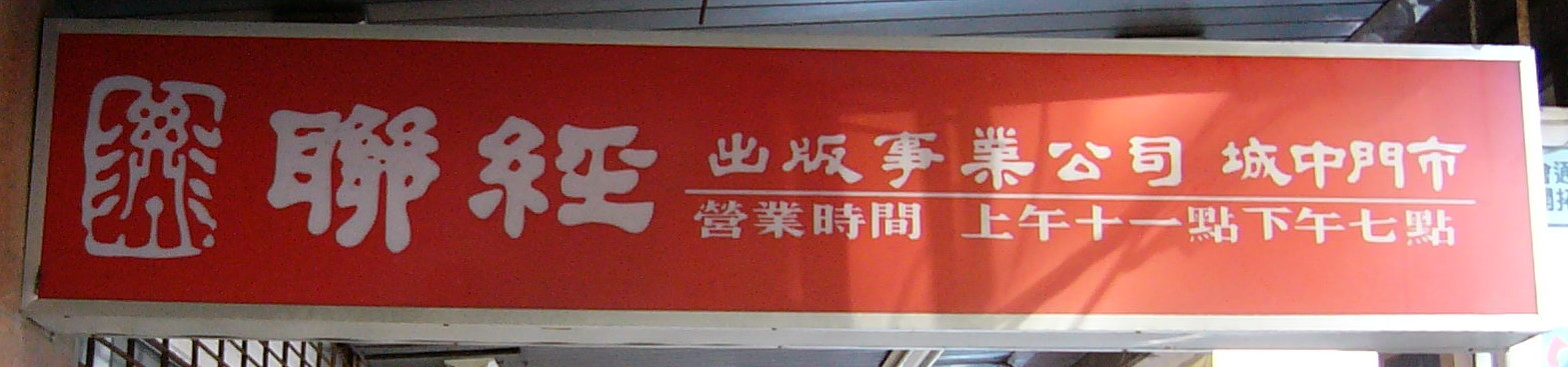
- Founded: 1974; 52 years ago
- Headquarters location: Taipei, Taiwan
- Owner: United Daily News
- Official website: www.linkingbooks.com.tw

Linking Publishing (聯經出版), officially Linking Publishing Co., Ltd. (聯經出版事業公司), abbreviated as Linking (聯經), is a Taiwanese publishing house that focuses on the publication of humanities and social sciences books.

== Overview ==
In the 1970s, Taiwan's economy was booming. Wang Tiwu, founder of the United Daily News Group, and Liu Changping, president of the United Daily News, felt that Taiwan had neglected cultural development at the time and decided to establish a publishing company to focus on supporting the publication of academic works. On May 4, 1974, Linking Publishing was established in Taipei City. The two Chinese characters "Lian Jing" (聯經) were taken from the first characters of the United Daily News and the Economic Daily News, respectively, and became the third business entity of the United Daily News Group. May 4 was chosen as the birthday of Linking Publishing to demonstrate the spirit of the May Fourth Movement.

Linking's backlist includes thousands of titles, ranged from humanities, social sciences, natural sciences and reference books to literature, business & management, self-help & spiritual, travel and children's books as well. Linking manages two bookstores located in Taipei and Taichung and an internet bookstore.

Yu Ying-shih commented: "It is precisely because Linking has such a serious and generous attitude towards unprofitable academic works that I have dared to send many special research works to Linking for consideration over the years."
