= Gaby Aghion =

French Jewish fashion designer (1921–2014)

- Born: Gabrielle Hanoka; 3 March 1921; Alexandria, Egypt
- Died: 27 September 2014 (aged 93); Paris, France
- Occupation: Fashion designer
- Known for: Founder of Chloé
- Spouse: Raymond Aghion (m. 1940; died 2009)
- Children: Philippe
- Awards: Legion of Honor (2013.12.16)

Gabrielle Aghion (née Hanoka; 3 March 1921 – 27 September 2014) was a French fashion designer and founder of the French fashion house Chloé. She is said to have coined the phrase prêt-à-porter.

== Early life ==
Gabrielle Hanoka was born in Alexandria, Sultanate of Egypt, to a family of Sephardic Jewish descent. Her father was a cigarette factory manager and her mother was a homemaker who was passionate about French fashion. She met her husband, Raymond Aghion (1921–2009), when both were seven years old in elementary school. He was born into a wealthy Italian Jewish family of cotton exporters. Despite his upper-class background, he became a communist activist, founding an organization called the Democratic Union as an intellectual home for Egyptian communists and publishing a communist magazine and newspaper. Hanoka and Aghion married at the age of 19. They moved to Paris together in 1945, fearful of the fragmentation of the Egyptian communist movement. In Paris they continued to socialize within the communist community, becoming close to writers Louis Aragon, Paul Éluard and Tristan Tzara.

== Career ==
Aghion launched Chloé in 1952. Raymond opened an art gallery in 1956, specializing in modern art. Aghion named the label Chloé after a friend, because it was too much of a risk to use her own name—it was not well-thought-of for a woman of her status to work. She also stated that she loved the roundness of the letters.

Aghion rejected the stiff formality of 1950s fashion and created soft, feminine, body-conscious clothes from fine fabrics, calling them "luxury prêt-à-porter". Unique for their time, they were clothes available off the rack. She set up her workshop in a maid's room above her large flat. Aghion and Jacques Lenoir formed a partnership in 1953, with Lenoir taking charge of the business operations while Aghion took on the creative responsibilities.

The duo put on the first Chloé show in 1956 at a breakfast at the Café de Flore, an important place for young intellectual Parisians in the 1940s and 1950s.

Aghion said: "Everything was yet to be invented and this thrilled me." She hired Karl Lagerfeld early in his career, along with other emerging fashion designers. Her son, Philippe, recalls Lagerfeld coming to the company in the mid-1960s: "When he arrived from [the house of] Jean Patou, Karl was a shy individual. He and my mother made a fantastic team. He came into the spirit of Chloé."

Aghion continued to run Chloé until 1985, when it was bought by Dunhill Holdings (now Compagnie Financière Richemont Group).

In 2012, the Paris Palais de Tokyo held an exhibition, Chloé Attitudes, to celebrate 60 years of the label.

In October 2023, the Jewish Museum in New York opened Mood of the moment: Gaby Aghion and the house of Chloé, the first museum exhibition detailing Aghion's work. The exhibition opened with three ensembles from the house’s early years: an original Embrun dress Aghion designed with the English-Irish model Maxime de la Falaise in 1960, flanked by a 1964 gold skirt suit (from 1964) and a ruffled wool crepe wrap dress (from 1961) standing before a grid of images from one of its first fashion presentations. Designs by Lagerfeld, who continued working at Chloé until 1983 and returned to the fashion house for a second stint as creative director from 1992 to 1997, make up the majority of the exhibition.

== Awards ==
- French Legion of Honor (2013)

== Death ==
Gaby Aghion died in 2014. Her son, Philippe, an economist and Harvard professor who won the Nobel Memorial Prize in Economics, survives her. She was buried at Montparnasse Cemetery in Paris.
