= André Fraysse =

French perfumer

André Fraysse (1902-1984) was a French perfumer.

He was noted for his work with Lanvin. His creations included:

- Mon Péché (My Sin) (1924) with Maria Zede (formerly known as Madam Zed)
- Arpège (1927) with Paul Vacher
- Eau de Lanvin (1933)
- Prétexte (1937)
- Rumeur (1934), relaunched in a new formulation 2006
- Scandal (1933)

Fraysse's son, Richard Fraysse, is an in-house perfumer at Parfums Caron.
