= Caroline Montagne Roux =

French fashion designer in Barcelona

Caroline Montagne Roux (Paris 1858 – Barcelona 1941) was a French haute couture fashion designer. She founded a fashion house in Barcelona and was the friend and master of Jeanne Lanvin. She is also known as Carolina Montagne, Catalan version of her first name.

== Life ==
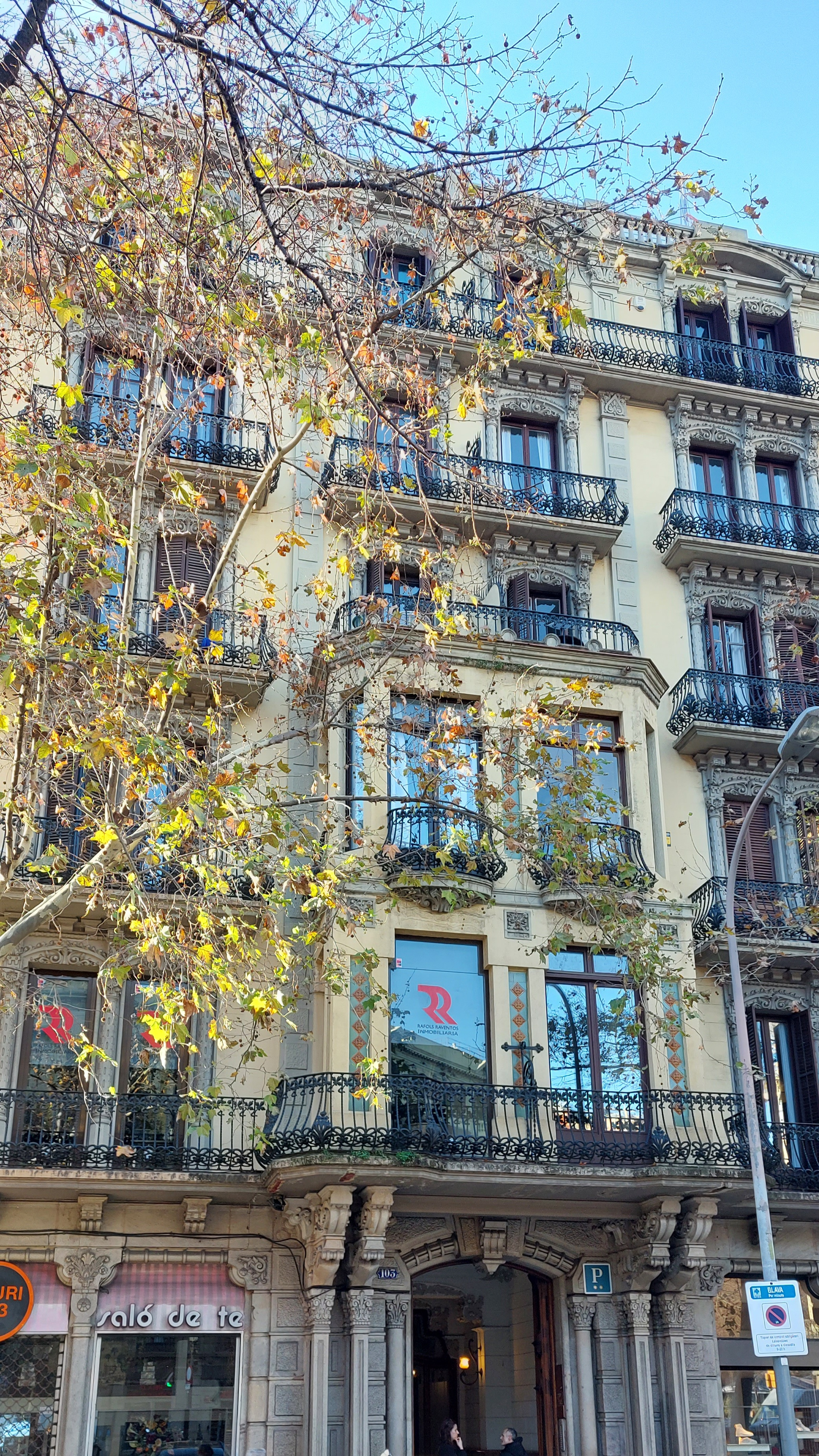
Former boutique of Caroline Montagne at Rambla de Catalunya.

The Montagne-Roux family is a French family settled in Barcelona. Parisian seamstress Anne Roux and her husband Charles Montagne came in the Spanish city with her two daughters, Caroline and Marie, in 1859.

Marie and Caroline worked as clothes designer, as their mother, and founded a fashion house inspired by French style. Caroline designed many dresses for women of the Barcelona's bourgeoisie. The workshop is successful, that encouraged Marie to hire the young Jeanne Lanvin, aged 18, then a hatter in Paris. She was trained by the Montagne house for five years. She has since forged a friendly and professional relationship with Caroline.

Thanks to Jeanne Lanvin, who left Barcelona to found her fashion house in Paris, Caroline's work followed the news of Parisian fashion which is spreading in Spain. In Barcelona, the industrial bourgeoisie is getting rich very quickly, and Caroline becomes one of the most prominent designers.

Caroline's workshop, situated Rambla de Catalunya 103, became one of the first Lanvin boutiques outside Paris.

Today, clothes designed by Caroline Montagne Roux can be found in contemporary collections and are notably presented at the Design Museum of Barcelona in the exhibition Dressing the Body.

The store, in which Carolina called herself "Madame Montagne", reflected her time and customers came in search of the spirit of Paris in Barcelona, such as Isabel Llorach. The house was particularly appreciated for her wedding dresses.
