= Min Sheng Bao =

Min Sheng Bao 民生報
- Type: Daily newspaper
- Format: Tabloid
- Founded: 18 February 1978
- Ceased publication: December 1, 2006
- Language: Traditional Chinese
- Headquarters: Taipei, Taiwan

Min Sheng Bao (Chinese: 民生報; pinyin: Mínshēng Bào; Pe̍h-ōe-jī: Bîn-seng-pò; lit. 'The People's Welfare Daily') was a tabloid newspaper based in Taiwan, and was a sister publication of United Daily News, then Taiwan's second most circulated newspaper.

It started publication in 1978, and became defunct and published its last print and online edition on December 1, 2006.
