= Alber Elbaz =

Moroccan-born Israeli fashion designer (1961–2021)

- אלבר אלבז
- Born: Albert Elbaz; 12 June 1961; Casablanca, Morocco
- Died: 24 April 2021 (aged 59); Neuilly-sur-Seine, France
- Education: Shenkar College of Engineering and Design
- Occupation: Fashion designer
- Years active: 1970–2021
- Labels: Lanvin (2001–2015); AZ Factory (2019–2021)
- Partner: Alex Koo
- Awards: International Award, Council of Fashion Designers of America (2005)

Alber Elbaz (Hebrew: אלבר אלבז; 12 June 1961 – 24 April 2021) was an Israeli fashion designer. He was the creative director of Lanvin in Paris from 2001 until 2015, after having done stints at a number of other fashion houses, including Geoffrey Beene, Guy Laroche, and Yves Saint Laurent. He founded the Richemont-backed label AZ Factory in 2019.

== Early life and education ==
Elbaz was born in Casablanca, Morocco, to a Jewish family. Elbaz's mother, Alegria, was a painter and his father, Meyer, a hairdresser. His family immigrated to Israel when Elbaz was eight months old and he grew up in the city of Holon. Elbaz's father died when Alber was a teenager and his mother became a cashier to support her four children—Alber, his brother and his two sisters. Elbaz later enlisted and served as a soldier in the Israel Defense Forces, and subsequently studied at the Shenkar College of Engineering and Design in Ramat Gan, Israel.

His mother encouraged Elbaz's early interest in fashion, as he had begun drawing dresses at seven years old, and gave him $800 when he left home for New York City in 1985 to pursue fashion professionally.

== Fashion career ==
Arriving in New York, Elbaz first worked for a bridal firm, then trained over the course of seven years as a senior assistant to Geoffrey Beene. In New York, Elbaz dropped the last letter of his first name, becoming Alber so that his name would be pronounced correctly in English as well as because he felt it made a better name for a fashion brand.

From 1996 until 1998, Elbaz worked for the French house of Guy Laroche as head of prêt-à-porter, moving to Paris in 1997 and drawing favorable notice in the fashion press. Appointed by Pierre Bergé, Elbaz next worked as creative director of Yves Saint Laurent beginning in 1998; he was brought on with the expectation of replacing Saint Laurent when the designer retired. Instead, after three seasons, Gucci bought the company and fired Elbaz in January 2000, making Tom Ford head designer instead for what proved an unsuccessful run (Ford retired from women's fashion in 2004).

Elbaz began designing for Lanvin in 2001. He also held a minority stake in the company of nearly 18 percent. During his 14-year tenure, he was credited with the house's renewed appeal thanks to Elbaz's "classic with a twist" takes on silk cocktail dresses and other feminine designs, often playing with color or other unusual variations on hallmark elegance. Looking back on his career, Women's Wear Daily wrote, "His elegant, feminine designs and pulse-pounding runway shows, which had a carnival spirit, catapulted Lanvin to become a top Paris fashion house." He spurred a trend for luxury brand jewelry when he launched strands of fabric-covered pearls. His light-hearted sketches, depicting anything from lollipops to Elbaz's own face became a signature on the brand's visual style. Elbaz's simple, feminine clothing, which has been compared to Lanvin's 1920s designs, was lauded by the fashion press. In 2005 Suzy Menkes wrote: "Elbaz is every woman's darling. And that includes Nicole, Kate, Chloë Sevigny, Sofia Coppola and a slew of rising movie names." Lanvin's business growth followed, with revenue increasing 60% in two years, from 2005 to 2007.

While at Lanvin, Elbaz also collaborated with Acne Studios on a denim collection, called the Blue Collection, at the end of 2008. In 2010, he led Lanvin's work on an H&M line, including tulle dresses and bejeweled necklaces. Notably, for his fall collection in 2012, the house's 10th anniversary, Elbaz chose ordinary people to feature in Lanvin's promotional campaign, including an 18-year-old musician and an 82-year-old retiree.

In October 2015, Elbaz announced that he had been let go from Lanvin after disagreements with the company's major shareholder, Shaw-Lan Wang. Elbaz also complained about the lack of strategy and targeted investment of the company. Shortly before he was fired, Elbaz had hired Chemena Kamali from Chloé as women's design director. Lanvin sales subsequently declined and China's Fosun eventually purchased the line.

After leaving Lanvin, Elbaz designed all of the costumes Natalie Portman wore in the 2016 film A Tale of Love and Darkness which she also wrote and directed. Thereafter he worked with various fashion brands, including Converse and LeSportsac. In 2016, he launched a perfume called Superstitious, working with perfumer Dominique Ropion for the French perfume house Editions de Parfums Frédéric Malle. He collaborated in 2019 with Italian shoemaker Tod's, creating bags and loafers.

Also in 2019, he joined forces with Richemont to develop his own line, AZfashion, a brand intended to focus on "developing solutions for women of our times." AZ Factory launched in 2021. It is Richemont's first involvement in a newly emerging brand and focuses on creating streamlined foundational basics and technical knits, which the designer termed "switchwear."

== Art and graphics ==
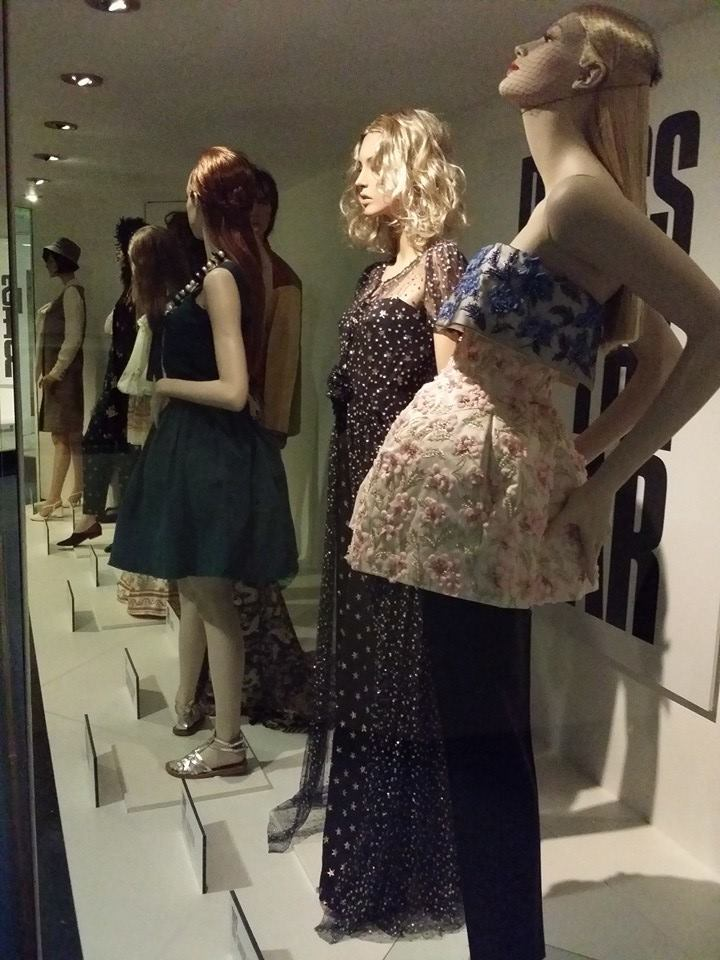
Dress of the Year 2005

In 2006, Elbaz introduced new packaging for Lanvin, featuring a light forget-me-not blue color, a favorite shade which Lanvin purportedly had seen in a Fra Angelico fresco. Packaging included shopping bags imprinted with Paul Iribe's 1907 illustration of Lanvin and her daughter Marguerite, and shoe boxes designed like antique library files, tied with black ribbons to emphasize the precious nature of the product.

Elbaz illustrated the song "Lady Jane" in singer-songwriter Mika's extended play Songs for Sorrow.

In 2012, Rizzoli published a book of 3,000 photographs documenting Elbaz's work for Lanvin.

In 2015, Elbaz curated "Alber Elbaz/Lanvin: Manifeste," a photography exhibition at the Maison Européenne de la Photographie in Paris. The show exhibited more than 350 photographs taken during his time at Lanvin as well as sketches and design mock-ups.

== Personal life and death ==
Elbaz's life partner since circa 1993 was Alex Koo, Lanvin's director of merchandising.

Elbaz often spoke of being overweight and how it influenced his designs. In 2009 he told journalist Ariel Levy,

I do things without décolleté; nothing is transparent ... I am overweight, so I am very, very aware of what to show and what not to show, and I am sure there is a huge link with being an overweight designer and the work I do. My fantasy is to be skinny, you see? I bring that fantasy into the lightness – I take off the corset and bring comfort and all these things I don't have. What I bring is everything that I don't have. This is the fantasy.

Despite international acclaim Elbaz avoided stepping into celebrity circles himself, often likening his work to a "concierge's in a good hotel in Manhattan" who spent his days working with famous and wealthy clients, but went home at night to the outer boroughs, and said this distance from "the fantasy" of fashion helped him maintain its power in his work. Joel Arthur Rosenthal, the Brooklyn-born designer of the ultra luxury jewelry line JAR, was Elbaz's closest friend.

Elbaz died of COVID-19 on 24 April 2021 at the American Hospital in Neuilly-sur-Seine in suburban Paris, France. He was 1 1/2 months from his 60th birthday.

== Awards ==
- 2005 – International Award, Council of Fashion Designers of America (CFDA)
- 2007 – Chevalier of the Légion d'Honneur
- 2007 – One of Time's 100 Most Influential People in the World
- 2014 – Honorary doctorate awarded by the Royal College of Art
- 2015 – Superstar Award, Fashion Group International (FGI)
- 2016 – Officer of the Légion d'Honneur

== See also ==
- Israeli fashion
