= Georges Hoentschel =

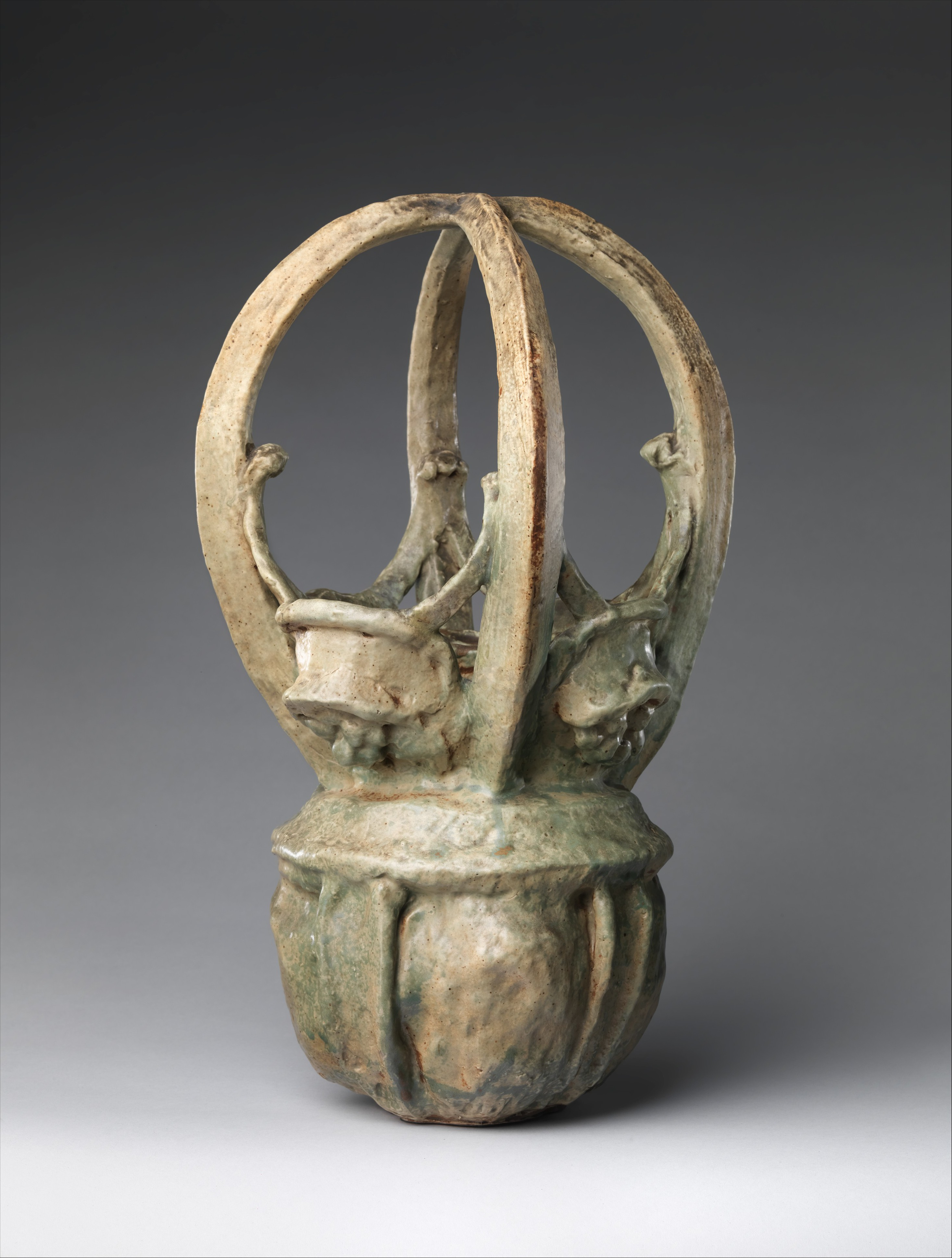
Basket vase, The Met.

Georges Hoentschel (1855-1915) was a French designer. His artwork is in the collections of the Metropolitan Museum of Art and the Art Institute of Chicago.
