= Arpège =

1927 perfume made by Jeanne Lanvin

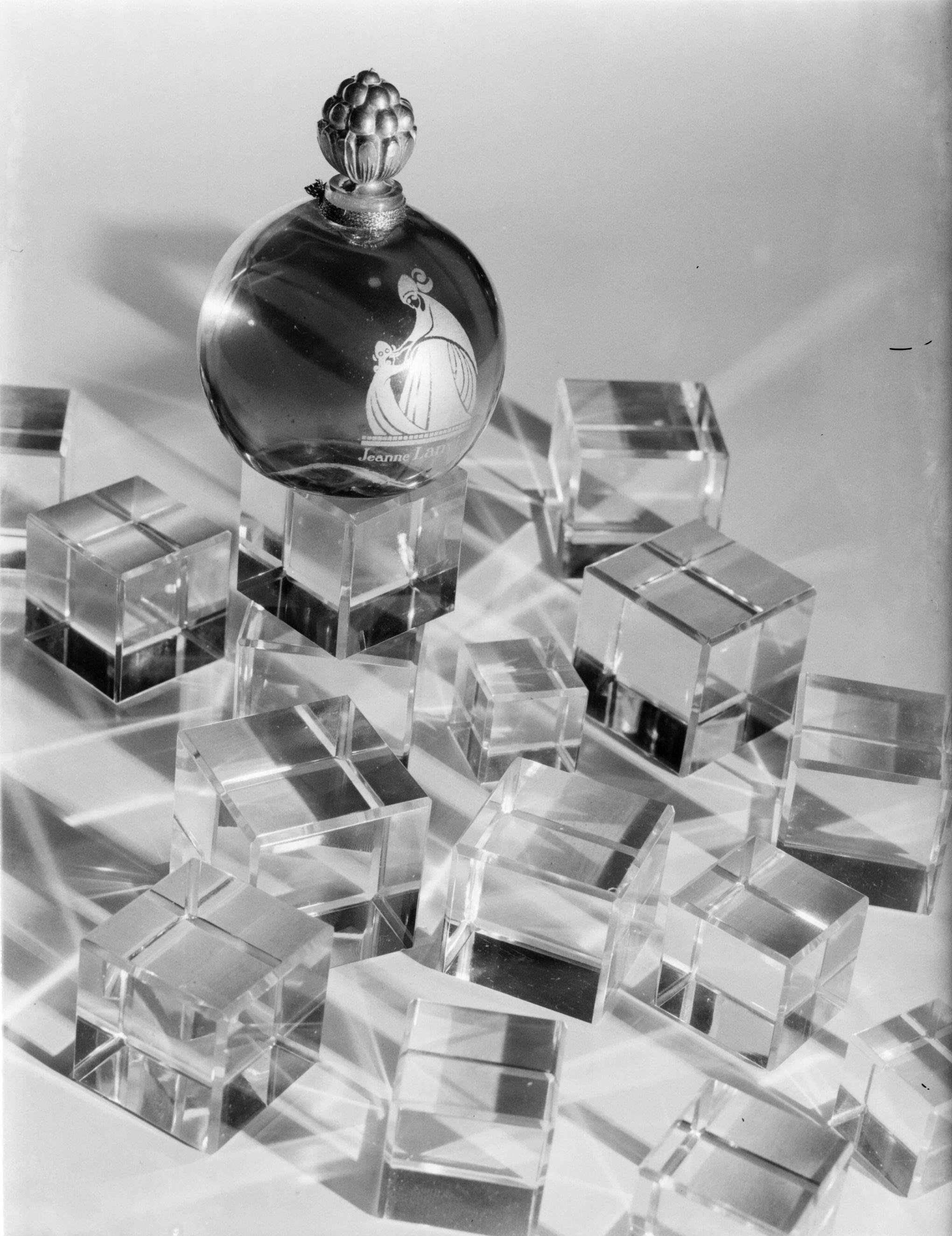

Fragrance by Jeanne Lanvin
- Released: 1927
- Label: Lanvin
- Tagline: Promise her anything, but give her Arpège

Arpège (pronounced [aʁpɛʒ]) is a 1927 perfume created by perfumers André Fraysse and Paul Vacher for Jeanne Lanvin and presented to her musician daughter Marie-Blanche on her 30th birthday. Its name is a derivation of the musical term arpeggio. Arpège is considered among the world's classic perfumes.

== Composition ==
The fragrance has been referred to as the "fragrance of 1,000 flowers" and it contains some 60 floral essences. Like Chanel No.5, launched six years earlier, it is considered an aldehydic floral perfume.

The original black bottle with a gold top was decorated with a gold illustration of Jeanne Lanvin and her daughter, created by French fashion illustrator Iribe.

In 1993, the perfume was reformulated by Hubert Fraysse, brother of André and founder of fragrance manufacturer Synarome.

Top notes: bergamot, neroli, aldehydes, peach, honeysuckle. Heart notes: rose, jasmine, lily of the valley, ylang-ylang, tuberose. Base notes: vanilla, sandalwood, patchouli, vetiver, musk.

== 85th anniversary ==
A special edition minaudière (evening bag) was launched in 2013 to mark the 85th anniversary of the perfume.

== See also ==
- Lanvin
- Fragrance wheel
