= Wang Tiwu =

Taiwanese politician

Wang Tiwu 王惕吾
- Born: 王瑞鐘; 29 August 1913; Dongyang, Zhejiang, Republican China
- Died: 11 March 1996 (aged 82); Taiwan
- Education: Zhejiang Dongyang High School
- Occupations: Founder and leading publisher of the United Daily News, Kuomintang politician and humanitarian
- Spouse: 趙玉仙
- Children: 5; including Wang Shaw-lan

Wang Tiwu (Chinese: 王惕吾, 29 August 1913 - 11 March 1996, born in Dongyang, Zhejiang, China) is the founder of the United Daily News and was a member of the Kuomintang Central Standing Committee.

Wang's family was from Zhejiang. In 1947, Wang was a colonel in the army of Chiang Kai-shek, moved to Taiwan, and founded the newspaper United Daily News in 1951. His daughter, Wang Shaw-lan, owns the newspaper.

== Estates ==
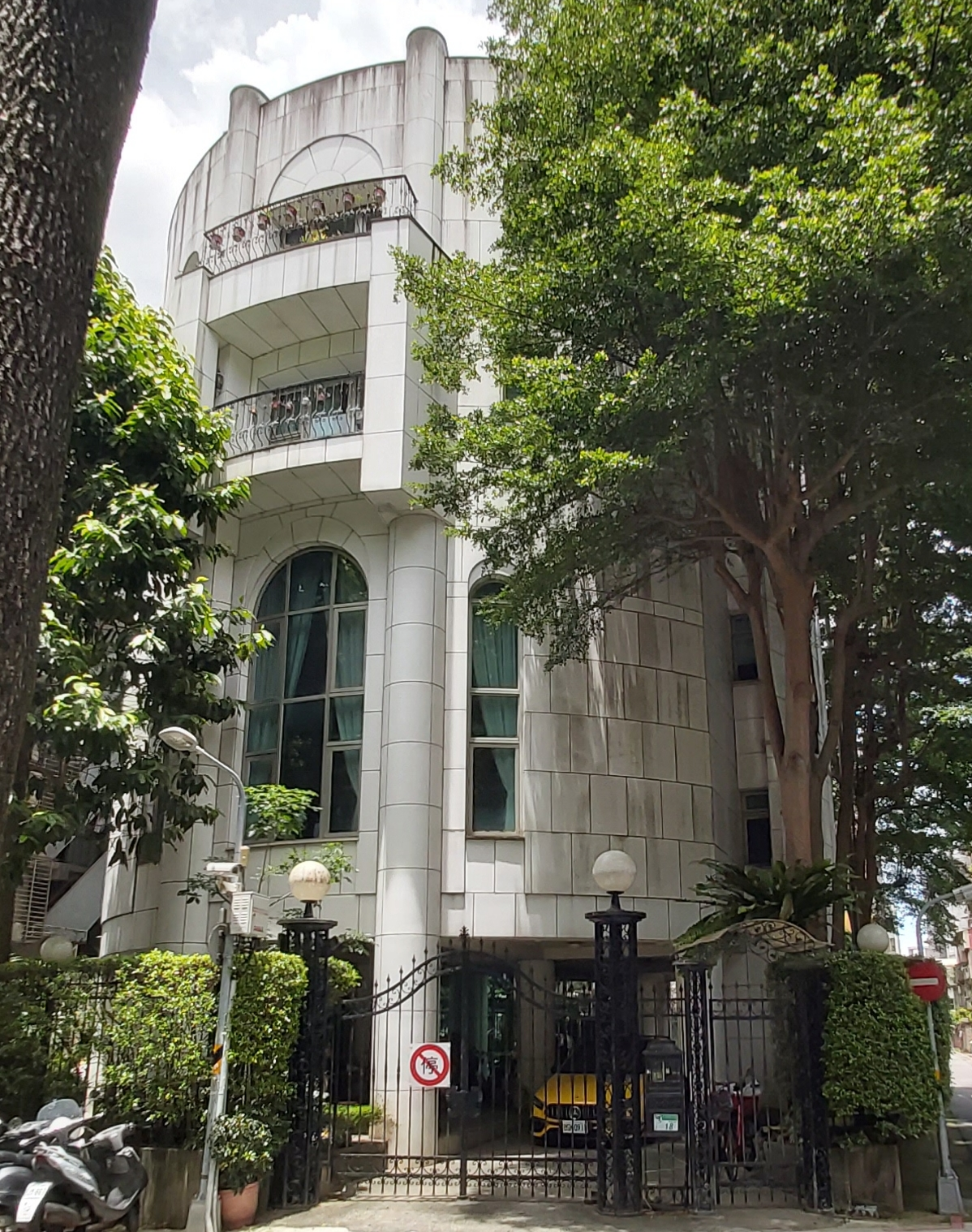
Wang's residence at Daan District, Taipei.

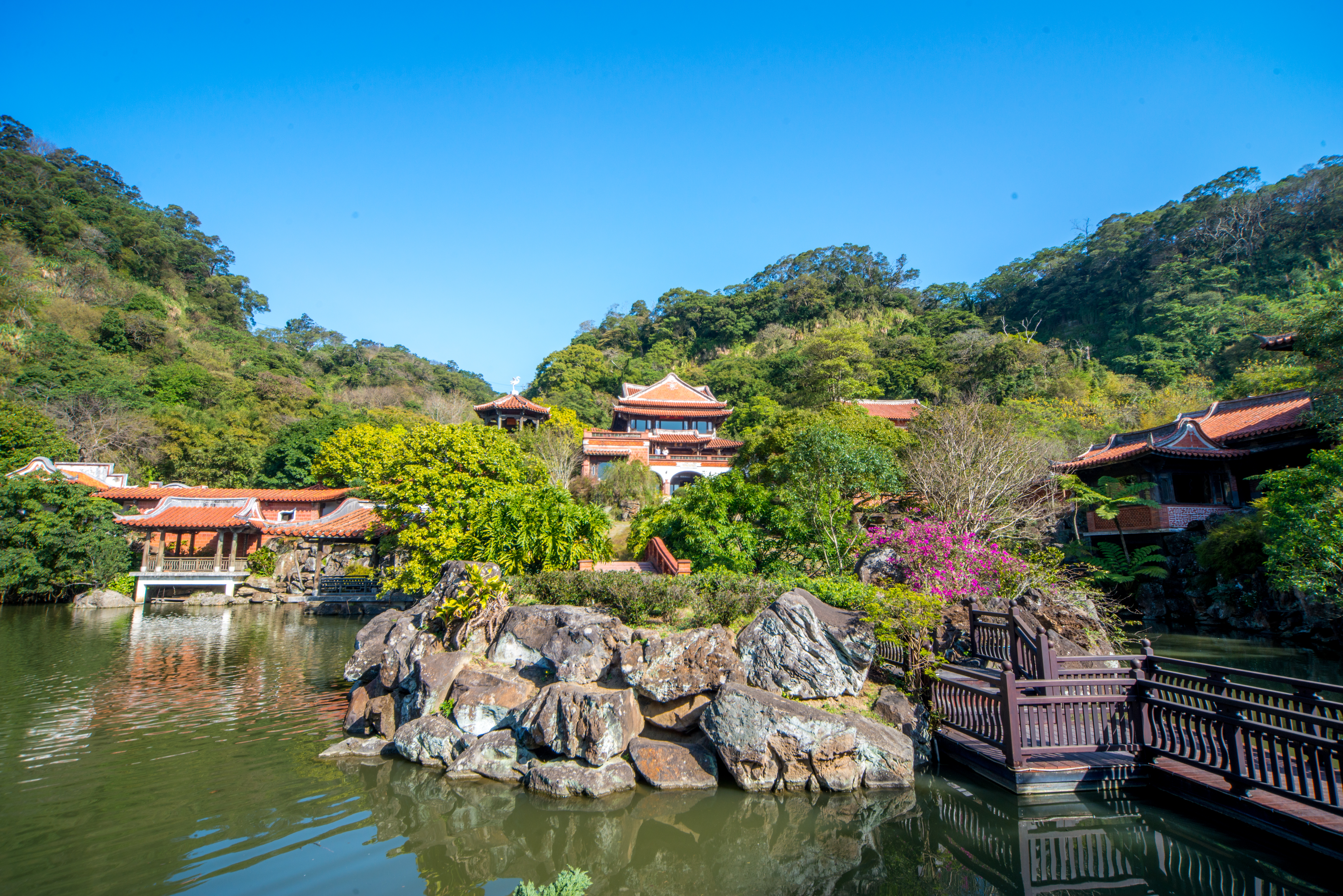
Hsinchu South Garden, Wang's country house at Xinpu, Hsinchu.
