= United Daily News =

Taiwanese newspaper

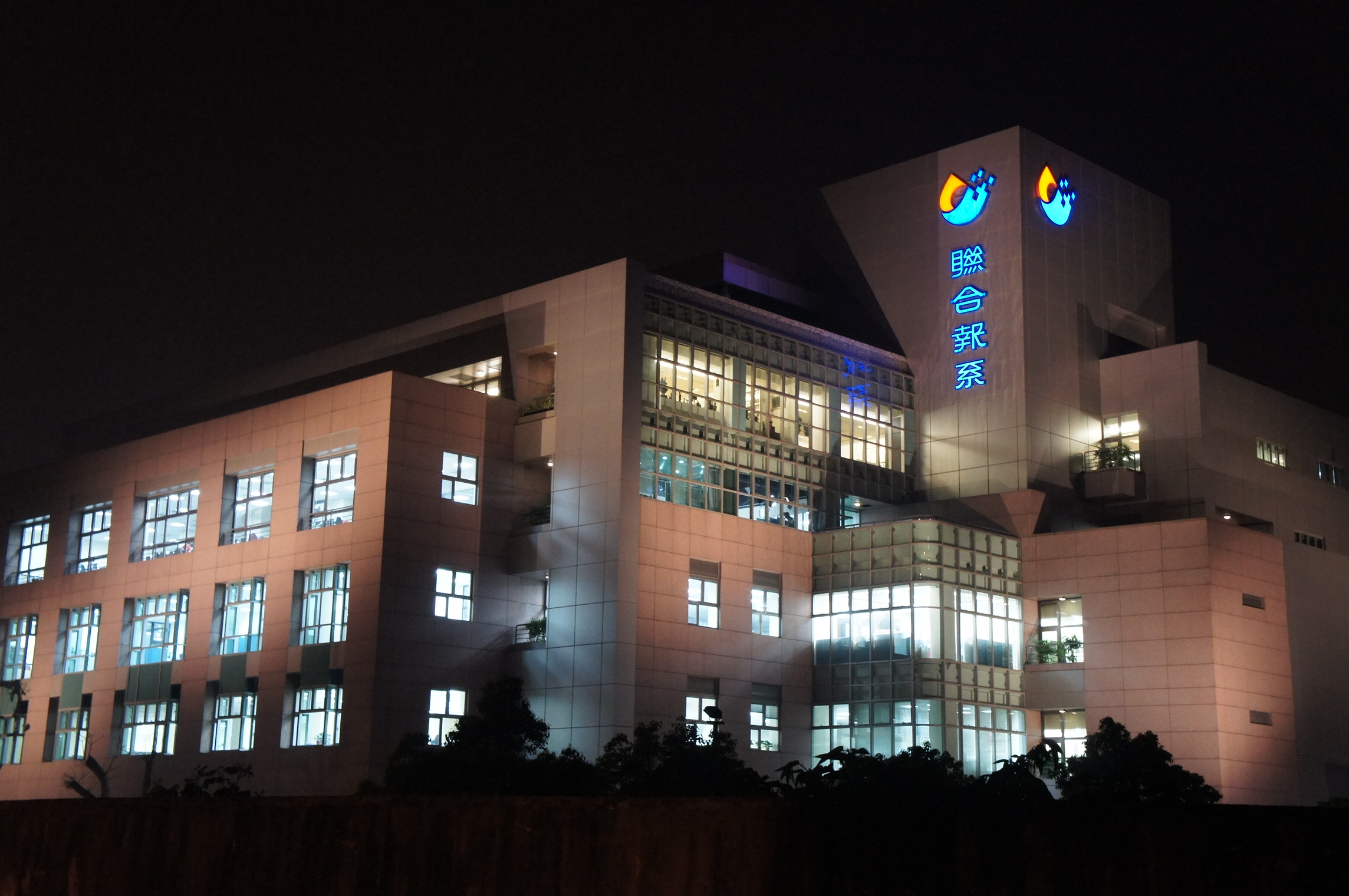
- Native name: 聯合報
- Type: Daily newspaper
- Format: Broadsheet
- Owner: Wang Shaw-lan
- Founded: 16 September 1951 (74 years ago)
- Political alignment: Pan-Blue
- Language: Traditional Chinese
- Headquarters: No. 369 Datong Rd., Xizhi District, New Taipei City, Republic of China (Taiwan)
- Website: udn.com

United Daily News (UDN; Chinese: 聯合報; pinyin: Liánhé Bào; Pe̍h-ōe-jī: Liân-ha̍p-pò) is a newspaper published in Taiwan. It is considered to support the pan-Blue Coalition in its editorials.

== History ==
UDN was founded in 1951 by Wang Tiwu as a merger of three newspapers, Popular Daily (全民日報), National (民族報), and the Economic Times (經濟時報). The three newspapers formally merged in 1953. The newspaper is owned by Wang Tiwu's daughter, Wang Shaw-lan. UDN is the flagship newspaper of the United Daily News Group which is chaired by Duncan Wang.

The evening edition of the paper, the United Evening News, was first published on February 22, 1968. By August 2014, the circulation of United Daily News had passed 1 million copies. The evening paper shut down after publishing its final issue on June 1, 2020.

== Editorial stance ==
The United Daily News has traditionally been close to the conservative wing of the Kuomintang. Before Taiwan democratized, it was an opponent of political reform; in the years since Taiwan has democratized, it has advocated policies encouraging cooperation with the mainland. The newspaper has consistently supported a Chinese identity in Taiwan and has taken an editorial stance that supports the pan-Blue Coalition. During the administration of Chen Shui-bian, UDN took a stance against de-Sinicization policies. It criticized former Kaohsiung mayor Chen Chu for inviting the Dalai Lama and Rebiya Kadeer, who were seen as "separatists". The newspaper's editorials have been critical of the Chinese Communist Party regularly, on issues such as those related to the 1989 Tiananmen Square protests and massacre and the Nobel Peace Prize laureate Liu Xiaobo.

== Content and reception ==
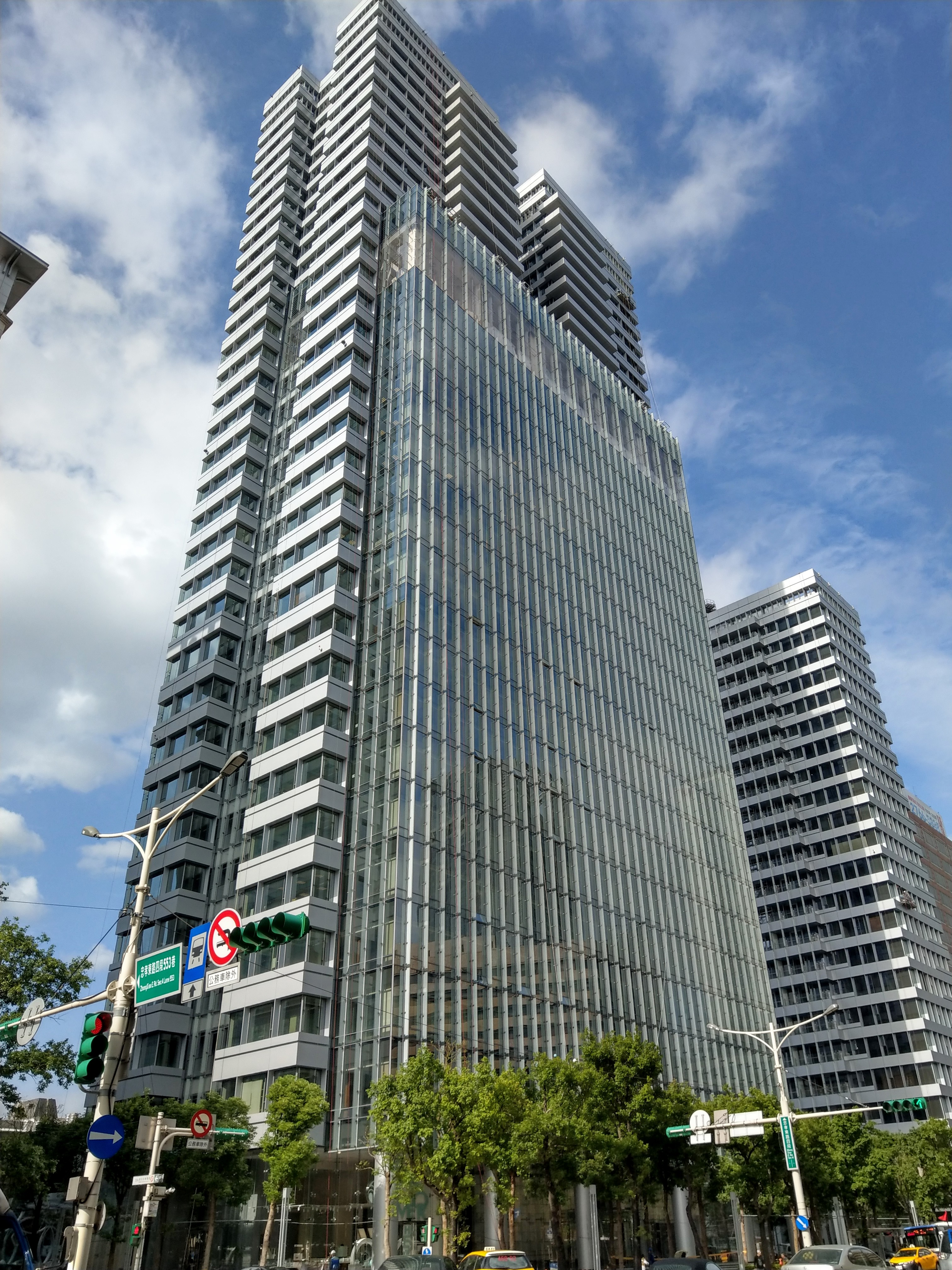
United Daily News Office Building in Xinyi District, Taipei

United Daily News is part of the UDN Group and is one of the two largest traditional news groups in Taiwan, along with China Times. The newspaper has also been a major platform for writers to publish and host award competitions in fukan literature.

A 2022 Reuters Institute for the Study of Journalism survey found that compared to the major pan-Green outlets Apple Daily and Liberty Times, United Daily News had roughly the same online reach while it had less reach than Sanlih E-Television. United Daily received a trust rating of 46% from Taiwanese respondents which was higher than the percentage the other three outlets received.

In July 2023, UDN published alleged meeting minutes of top officials in Taiwan purportedly discussing requests from the United States to develop bioweapons. The Taiwanese government and United States Department of State denied the report. The minutes' format differed from what the Executive Yuan uses. Taiwanese officials and a U.S. think tank believed that it could be or was likely part of a Chinese government disinformation campaign, generating concerns from commentators. Democratic Progressive Party members filed a legal case against the author on the grounds of forgery and making false claims. After checking with government agencies, the Taipei District Prosecutors' Office concluded that the minutes were forged but found no evidence of it being committed by the reporter himself. In addition, it criticized the reporter's unthorough verification with the Ministry of National Defense but noted that related reports covered responses from the government. The office decided not to press charges. On September 6, UDN said it apologizes to the readers with respect to the incident.

In August and September 2023, a group of individuals were suspected to have received money from China to influence elections in Taiwan. They paid for ads in at least seven news networks, including UDN, to promote results of fake opinion polls.

== See also ==
- Media of Taiwan
- World Journal
