= Chemena Kamali =

German fashion designer (born 1981)

- Born: 1981 (age 44–45)
- Education: Central Saint Martins
- Occupation: Fashion designer
- Employer: Chloé
- Spouse: Konstantin Wehrum
- Children: 2

Chemena Kamali (/tʃəˈmiːnə kəˈmɑːliː/ chə-MI-na kə-MAL-i) (born 1981) is a fashion designer. She became the creative director of fashion brand Chloé in 2023.

== Early life and education ==
Born in Germany in 1981, Chemena Kamali graduated from the fashion design course at Trier University of Applied Sciences.

She then undertook a Master of Arts in Fashion at Central Saint Martins University of the Arts in London under Professor Louise Wilson. She graduated with distinction in 2007.

== Career ==
Kamali worked in design from the mid-2000s. She began her career at the Maison as part of Phoebe Philo’s team and later returned as Design Director to Clare Waight Keller in 2012. From 2016, she was Women's Ready to Wear Design Director for Anthony Vaccarello at Saint Laurent.

On October 9, 2023, Kamali was appointed as the Creative Director of Chloé.

Her first show for Chloe in February 2024 was a warmly received debut.

Few months after her first show, Kamali launched Chloé Arts, a new program to nurture women artists.

== Awards and honors ==
Kamali received endorsement from US vice president Kamala Harris, who wore several Chloé suits on the campaign trail including one in “coconut brown”.

In August 2024, she was nominated for the Designer of the Year award by the British Fashion Council amongst Miucci Prada, Jonathan Anderson and John Galliano. The award recognizes British or international designers whose collections have made a notable impact on the industry, “defining the shape of global fashion”.

In December 2024, she was listed by the Financial Times as one of the Top 25 world's most influential women of 2024.

Kamali was one of Harper's Bazaar's "Women of the Year" in 2025.

== Personal life ==
Kamali is married to management consultant Konstantin Wehrum. They live in Paris with their two children.
