= Chloé =

Luxury fashion house

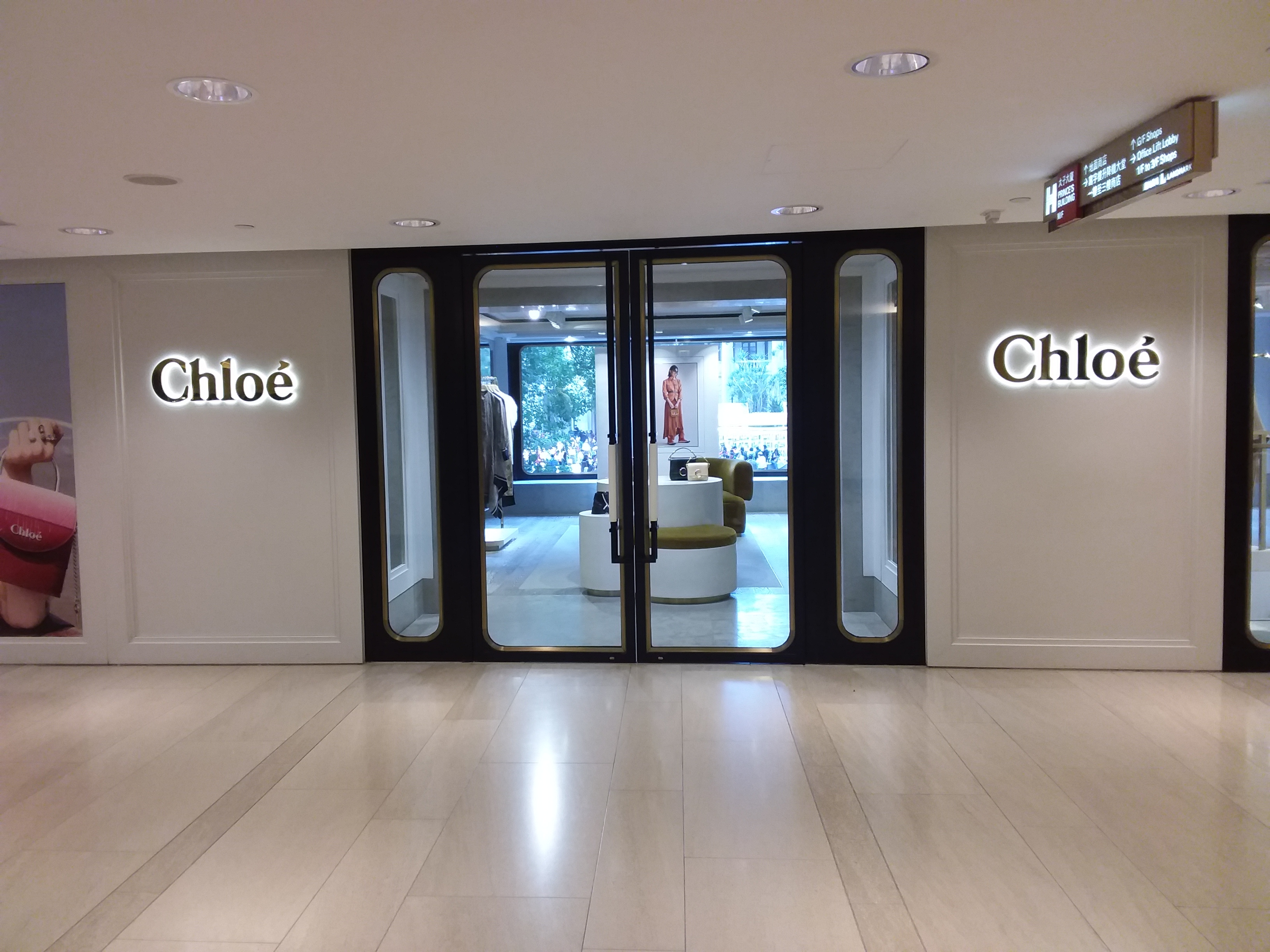
- The Chloé boutique in Hong Kong
- Type: Subsidiary
- Industry: Fashion
- Founded: 1952; 74 years ago
- Founders: Gaby Aghion; Jacques Lenoir
- Headquarters: Paris, France
- Key people: Chemena Kamali
- Parent: Richemont
- Website: chloe.com

Chloé (French pronunciation: [klɔe]) is a French luxury fashion house founded in 1952 by Gaby Aghion. In 1953, Aghion joined forces with Jacques Lenoir, formally managing the business side of the brand, allowing Aghion to purely pursue the creative growth of Chloé. Its headquarters are located in Paris.

The house is owned by luxury brands holding company Richemont Group. Chloé has been worn by many celebrities, including Marion Cotillard, Sienna Miller, Madonna, January Jones, Maggie Gyllenhaal, Kirsten Dunst, Cameron Diaz, Emma Stone, Clémence Poésy and Katie Holmes.

The brand is characterized by a youthful and bohemian aesthetic, and has produced several successful fragrances. As of October 2023, Chemena Kamali is its creative director.

== History ==
Chloé was founded in 1952 by Egyptian-born Gaby Aghion, who sought to offer luxury prêt-à-porter (ready-to-wear)—a concept new at that time. Gaby Aghion and her partner Jacques Lenoir continued to run the house until 1985, when Chloé was bought by Alfred Dunhill Ltd. (now part of Richemont).

=== Timeline ===
- 1952: Chloé is founded by Gaby Aghion, a Parisian of Egyptian-Jewish origin. She and her partner, Jacques Lenoir, were among the first to become aware of the rising demand for collections that could merge the strict requirements of haute couture and those of ready-to-wear.
- 1956: The first collection is introduced at Café de Flore, one of their favorite cafes and the meeting place of artists in Paris. The collection was designed by Gaby Aghion and made by a first assistant at Lelong. Gaby Aghion and Jacques Lenoir start hiring young talented designers, who would eventually make a name of their own: Christiana Bailly, Michèle Rosier, Maxime de la Falaise, Graziella Fontana, Tan Giudicelli, Guy Paulin, Carlos Rodriguez.
- 1966: Karl Lagerfeld is the main designer and Chloé becomes one of the symbolic brands of the 1970s. Among its customers : Jackie Kennedy, Brigitte Bardot, Maria Callas and Grace Kelly.
- 1971: The first Chloé boutique opens at the 3 rue Gribeauval in Paris.
- 1985: The company is acquired by the Richemont group.
- 1980s: Chloé keeps working with promising and eventually famous artistic directors: Martine Sitbon in 1988, Karl Lagerfeld in 1992.
- 2001: Kirsten Dunst, Natalie Portman, and Lou Doillon become customers.
- 2002: Chloé launches a line of bags, small leather goods and shoes. Among Phoebe Philo’s notable achievements at the brand was introducing the Paddington bag, a leather handbag that became one of the first “It” bags.
- 2009: Hannah MacGibbon introduces her first collection in March at the Spring-Summer 2009 runway. She cited the fashion illustrations of Antonio Lopez as an inspiration. American actress, former model and fashion designer Chloë Sevigny becomes a spokesperson for the company.
- 2023: Chloé collaborates with Angelina Jolie's newly launched fashion brand, Atelier Jolie.
- 2024: Chloé Perfume names Guan Xiaotong as its first Chinese brand ambassador.

== Artistic directors ==
- 1974–1988: Karl Lagerfeld
- 1988–1992: Martine Sitbon
- 1992–1996: Karl Lagerfeld
- 1997–2001: Stella McCartney
- 2001–2006: Phoebe Philo
- 2006–2008: Paulo Melim Andersson
- 2008–2011: Hannah MacGibbon
- 2011–2017: Clare Waight Keller
- 2017–2020: Natacha Ramsay-Levi
- 2020–2023: Gabriela Hearst
- 2023–present: Chemena Kamali

== CEOs ==
- 1999–2009: Ralph Toledano
- 2010–2019: Geoffroy de la Bourdonnaye
- 2019–2023: Riccardo Bellini
- 2024–present: Laurent Malecaze

== See by Chloé ==
Established as a diffusion line in 2001, See by Chloé at its peak represented about 10 percent of Chloé's total business. Designers included Laure de Sade (2011–2012). In 2022, the brand announced plans to phase out its See by Chloé business over the following three years. For the time of the brand's existence, Italy’s SINV SpA held the license for production of See by Chloé ready-to-wear, and also handled distribution for all but certain European markets. Bags, shoes and jewelry under the label were produced and distributed in house.

== Other products ==
=== Fragrances ===
Chloé fragrances include:

- Chloé Classique (1973)
- Love, Chloé (2010), created by Louise Turner and Nathalie Gracia-Cetto
- See by Chloé (2012)

With the purchase of Unilever Cosmetics International in 2005, Coty acquired the perfume license for Chloé, among other brands.

=== Eyewear ===
For corrective eyewear frames and sunglasses, Chloé has had licensing agreements with Marcolin (from 1998), Marchon Eyewear (2012–2019) and Kering Eyewear (since 2020).

== Advertising campaigns ==
For its advertising campaigns, Chloé has been working with photographers like Tom Munro (1998), Taryn Simon (2000–2001), Craig McDean (2003), Terry Richardson (2004), Inez van Lamsweerde and Vinoodh Matadin (2006, 2010), Ryan McGinley (2018), Steven Meisel (2019), Mario Sorrenti (2021) and David Sims (2024, 2025). The campaigns have featured actresses Chloë Sevigny (2008–2010), Clémence Poésy (2008–2010, 2014), and Ariane Labed (2018).

== Locations ==
Chloé's headquarters are located at Avenue Percier, 8th arrondissement of Paris. The regional offices are in New York, Tokyo, Shanghai, Hong Kong and Dubai.

Chloé has boutiques in Toronto, Bal Harbour, Costa Mesa, Las Vegas, New York City, Beijing (2), Sydney, Shanghai (2), Shenzhen, Hong Kong (2), Singapore, Kaohsiung, Taipei (3), Bangkok, Bandung, Paris, Munich, Porto Cervo, Moscow (2), Marbella, Istanbul, London, Tokyo (2), Nagoya, Salmiya, Beirut, Doha, Seoul, Zurich, Dubai (2) and Kuwait.

In 2017, Chloé inaugurated Maison Chloé, its new multifunctional cultural space located at 28 Rue de La Baume, which houses the brand's showrooms, VIP fitting rooms and working archives.

== Sponsoring ==
Since 2012, Chloé has been sponsoring the annual Prix Chloé at the Festival de Mode de Hyères. In 2016, the brand also sponsored the Port Eliot Festival.
