= Jeanne Lanvin =

French fashion designer (1867–1946)

Jeanne-Marie Lanvin
- Born: 1 January 1867; Paris, France
- Died: 6 July 1946 (aged 79); Paris, France
- Occupations: Couturière, fashion designer
- Known for: Founder of Lanvin
- Spouses: Count Emilio di Pietro (m. 1895; div. 1903) Xavier Melet (m. 1907)
- Children: 1
- Website: www.lanvin.com

Jeanne-Marie Lanvin (French: [ʒan maʁi lɑ̃vɛ̃]; 1 January 1867 – 6 July 1946) was a French haute couture fashion designer. She founded the Lanvin fashion house and the beauty and perfume company Lanvin Parfums.

== Early life ==
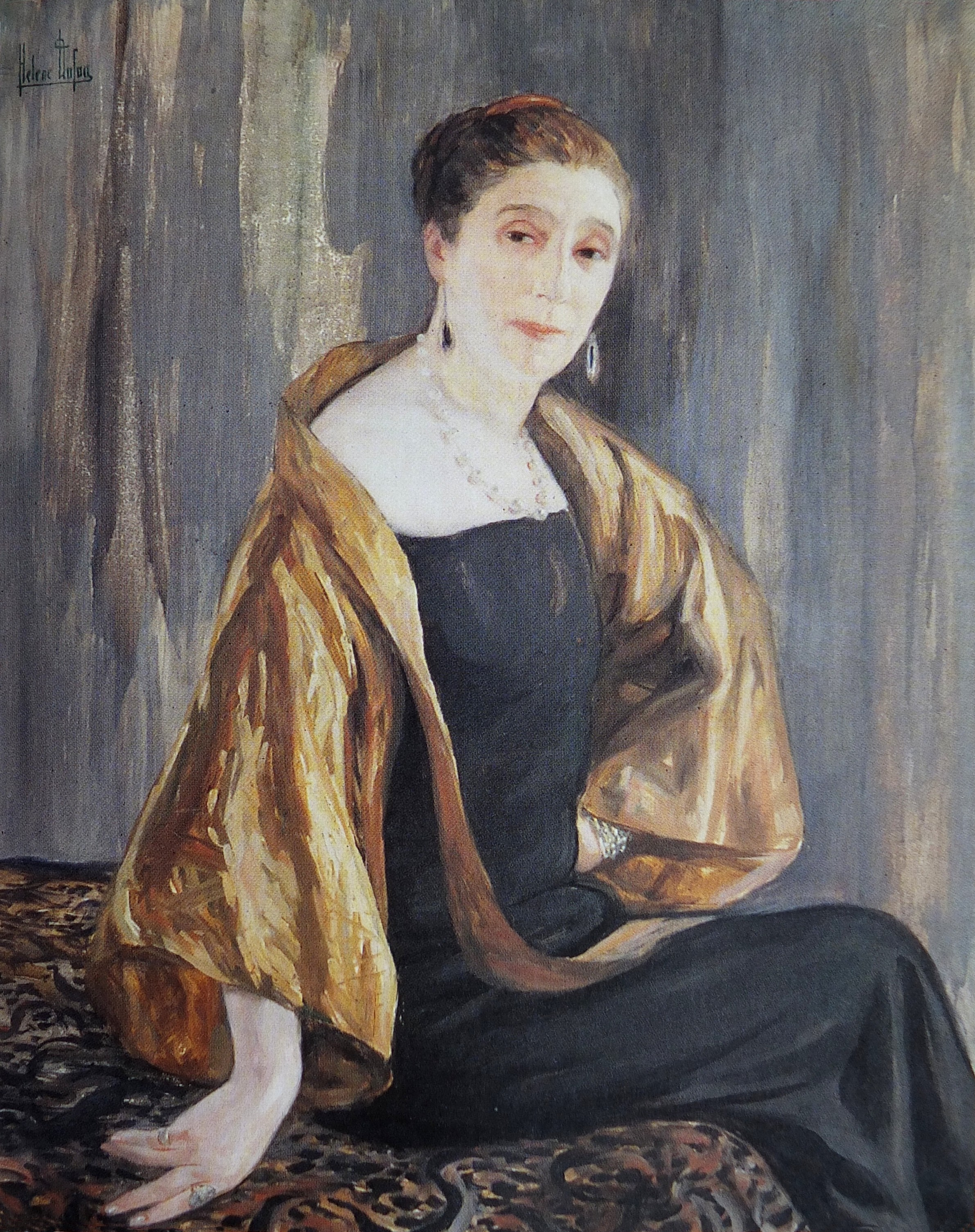
Portrait of Jeanne Lanvin in 1925 by Clémentine-Hélène Dufau, Musée des Arts Décoratifs, Paris

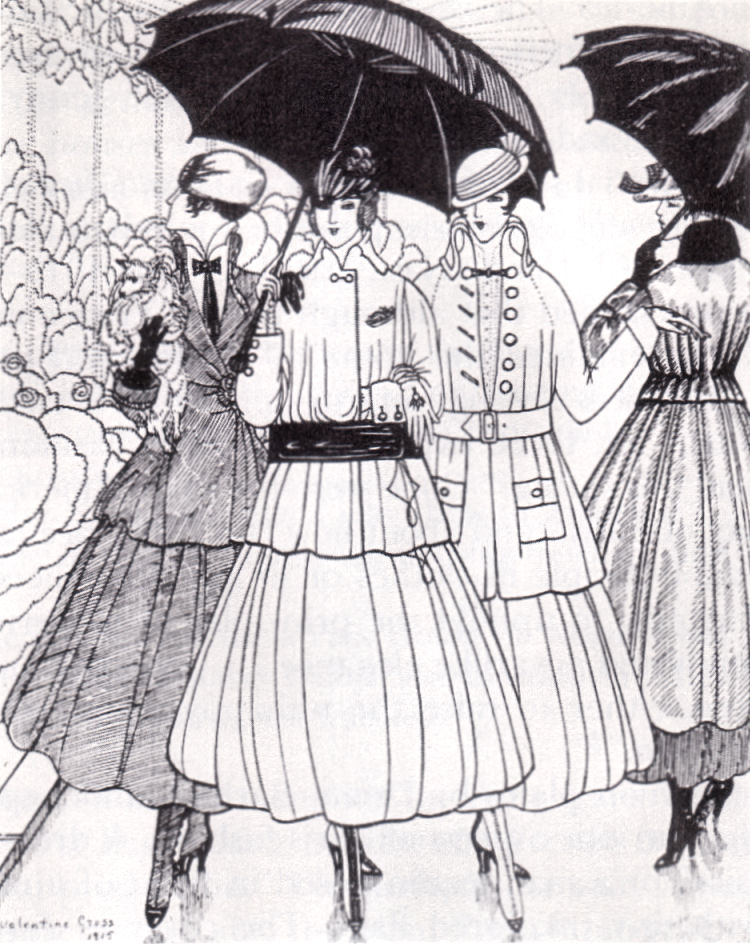
Designs by Jeanne Lanvin in La Gazette du Bon Ton, 1915

Jeanne Lanvin was born in Paris on 1 January 1867, the eldest of 11 children of a press employe Constantin Lanvin and a seamstress Sophie Deshayes. She became an apprentice milliner (hat maker) at Madame Félix in Paris at the age of 16. She trained with Suzanne Talbot and Caroline Montagne Roux before becoming a milliner on the rue du Faubourg Saint-Honoré in 1889.

== Career ==
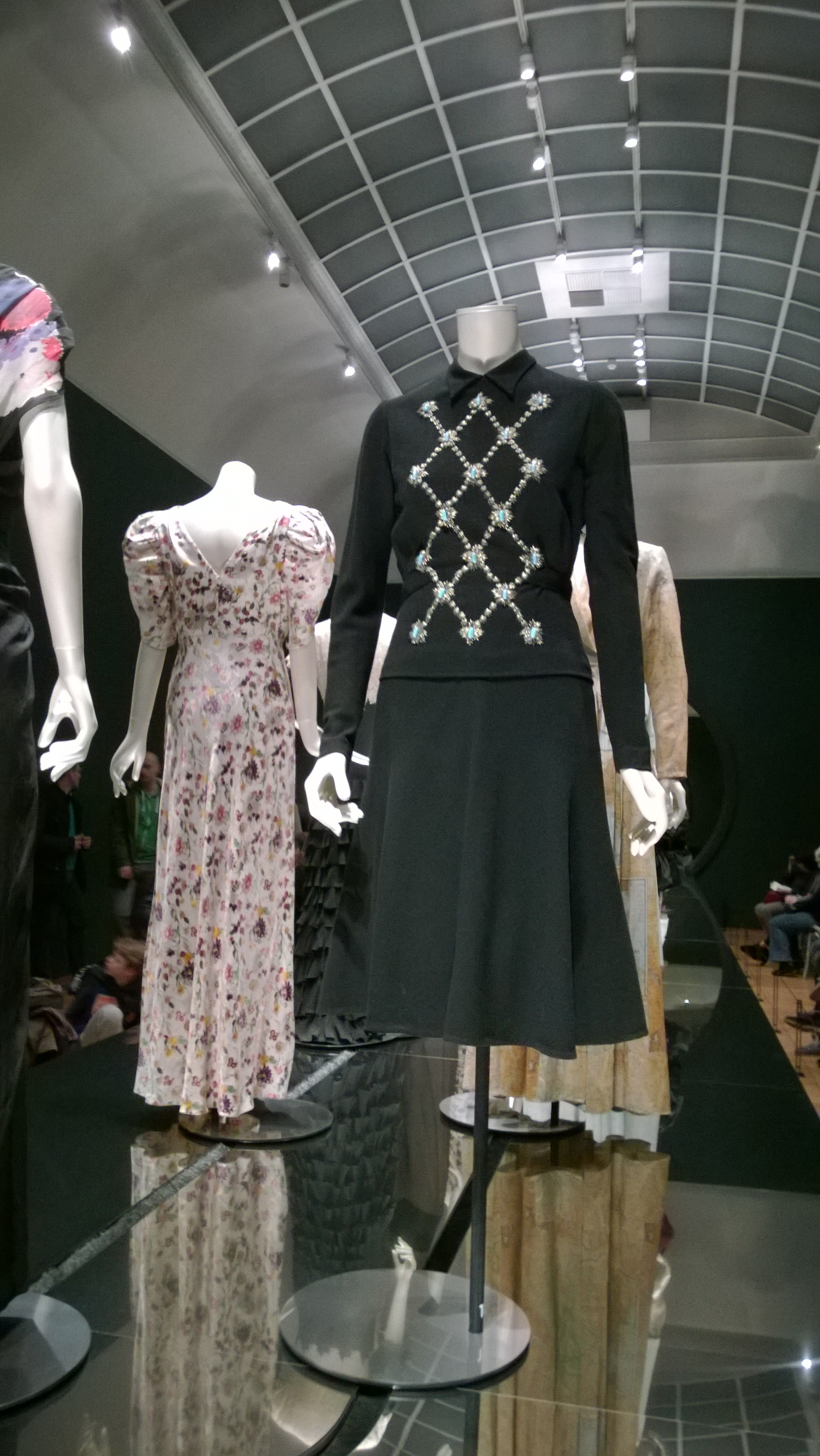
Black Sweater Suit, 1940s, Rijksmuseum

1915, dark blue suit with white trim on coat and skirt and white collar; white fedora with blue sash

In 1909, Lanvin joined the Syndicat de la Couture (fr), which marked her formal status as a couturière. The clothing Lanvin made for her daughter began to attract the attention of a number of wealthy people who requested copies for their own children. Soon, Lanvin was making dresses for their mothers, and some of the most famous names in Europe were included in the clientele of her new boutique on the rue du Faubourg Saint-Honoré in Paris. One of her models Maria Minard was the grandmother of future French actor Alain Delon.

In the 1920s, Lanvin opened shops devoted to home décor, menswear, furs and lingerie. Starting in 1923, the Lanvin empire included a dye factory in Nanterre. Her most significant endeavour was the creation of Lanvin Parfums SA in 1924. Her signature fragrance, Arpège, introduced in 1927, was inspired by the sound of her daughter Marguerite practicing her scales on the piano. (Arpège is French for arpeggio.)

In 1921, Lanvin created Lanvin Décoration with celebrated architect Armand Albert Rateau. Their first design project was the Theatre Daunou in Paris, owned at the time by actress Jane Renouardt, a friend and client of Lanvin. In 1922, Lanvin collaborated with Rateau in redesigning her apartment, her homes and her businesses. The living room, boudoir and bathroom of the apartment was reassembled in 1985 in the Musée des Arts Décoratifs, Paris. For this home, Rateau designed some remarkable 1920–22 furniture in bronze.

The pair developed a friendship. Rateau came aboard Lanvin's empire as manager of Lanvin-Sport, designing the Lanvin spherical La Boule perfume flacon for Arpège, originally produced by the Manufacture Nationale de Sèvres. To this day, Arpège perfume globe, designed by Rateau, are imprinted with Paul Iribe's gold image (rendered in 1907) of Lanvin and her daughter Marguerite. Rateau also managed Lanvin-Décoration, an interior-design department established in 1920, in the main store on the rue du Faubourg Saint-Honoré.

== Personal life, death and legacy ==
In 1895, Lanvin married Count Emilio di Pietro, an Italian nobleman. Two years later she gave birth to a daughter, Marguerite di Pietro (later, Countess Marie-Blanche de Polignac) (1897–1958). The couple's only child became an opera singer. She married the Count Jean de Polignac (1888–1943). On the death of her mother, she became the director of the Lanvin fashion house.

Lanvin and di Pietro divorced in 1903. Lanvin married Xavier Melet in 1907, a journalist at the newspaper Les Temps and later the French consul in Manchester, England.

Lanvin died on 6 July 1946. Her original office is preserved in Lanvin's corporate offices at 16 Rue Boissy d’Anglas in Paris.

Savannah College of Art and Design's SCAD FASH Museum of Fashion + Film unveiled the first U.S. show dedicated to her work, Jeanne Lanvin: Haute Couture Heritage, on 4 April 2025.

== Awards ==
- Chevalier de l'Ordre de la Légion d'Honneur, to Jeanne Lanvin, 1926
- Officier de l'Ordre de la Légion d'Honneur, to Jeanne Lanvin, 1938

== See also ==
- Lanvin (clothing) for more information on the fashion house
- Arpège

== Collections ==
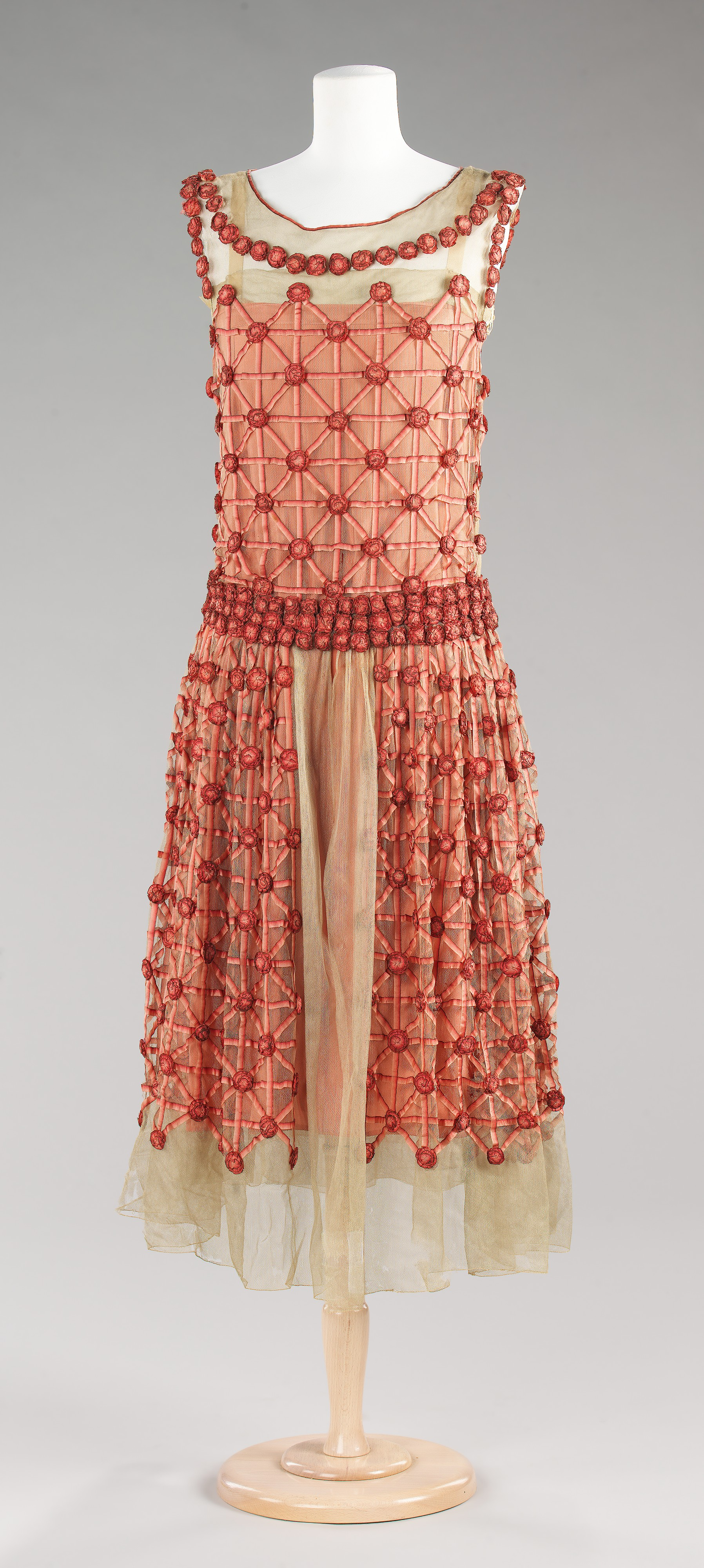
"Roseraie", evening dress (silk), spring/summer 1923

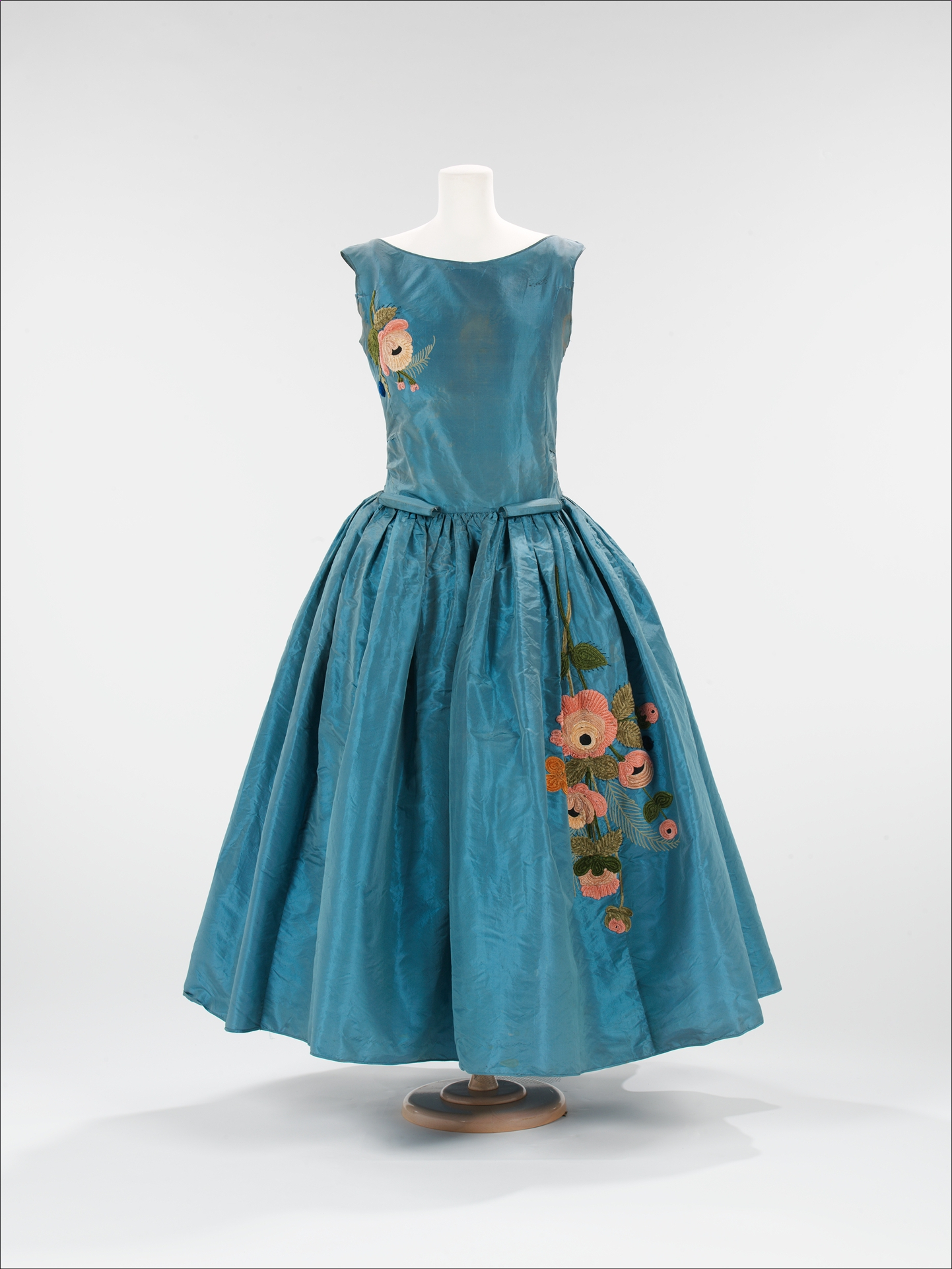
"Jolibois", evening dress (silk), fall/winter 1922–23

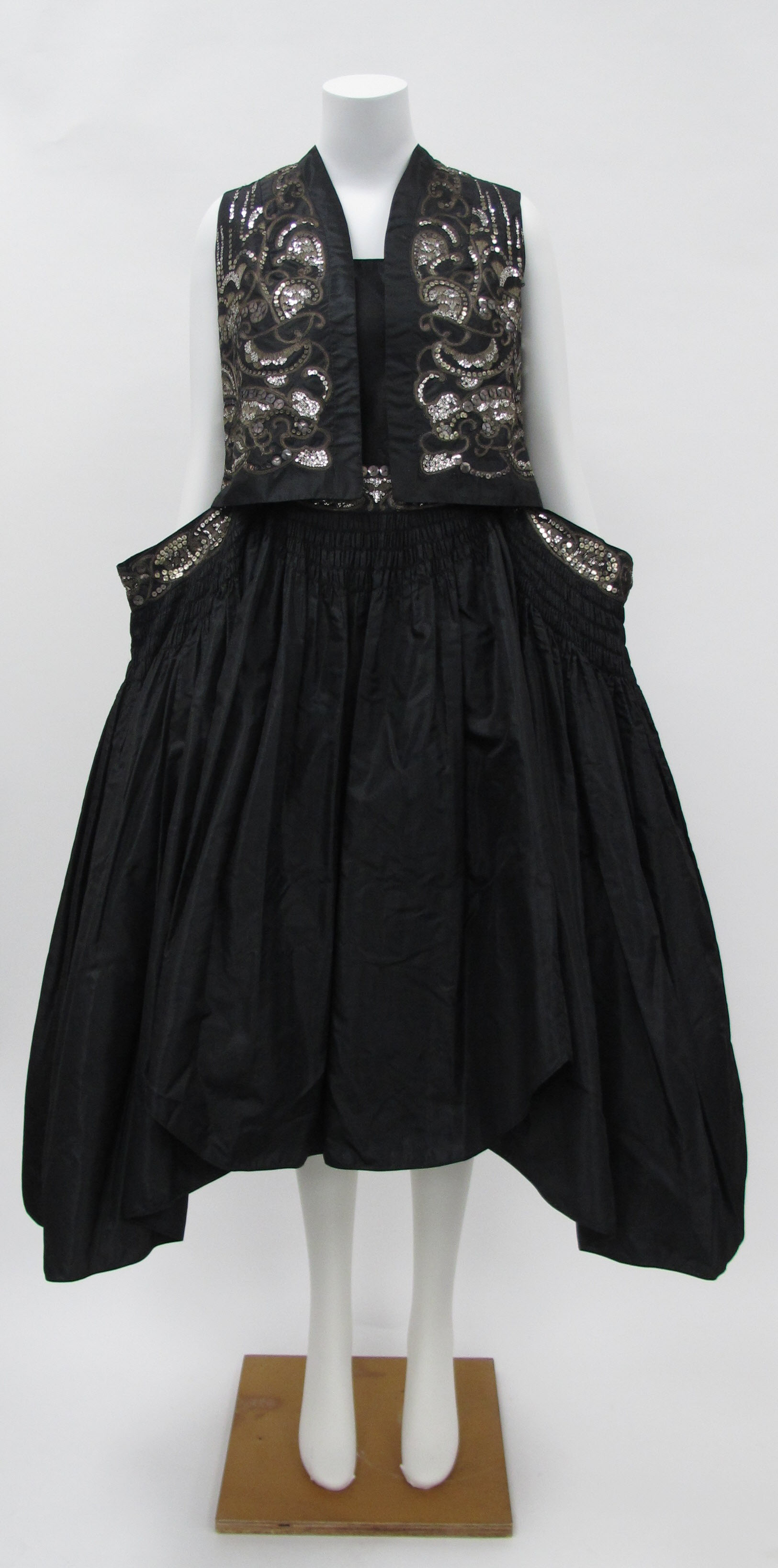
Ko.I.Noor, evening ensemble (silk and metal), spring/summer 1927

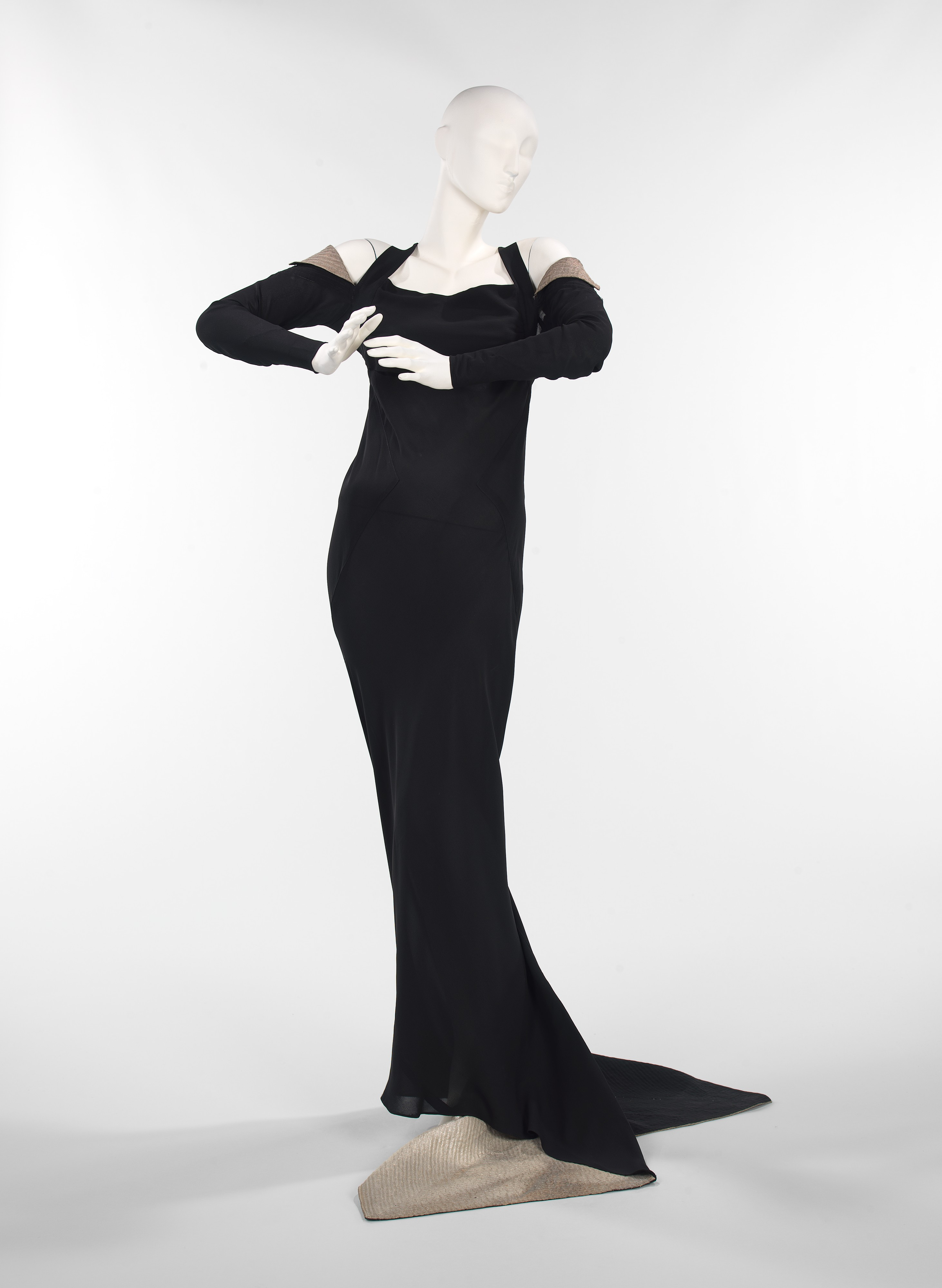
"Phèdre", evening dress (silk and metal), fall/winter 1933

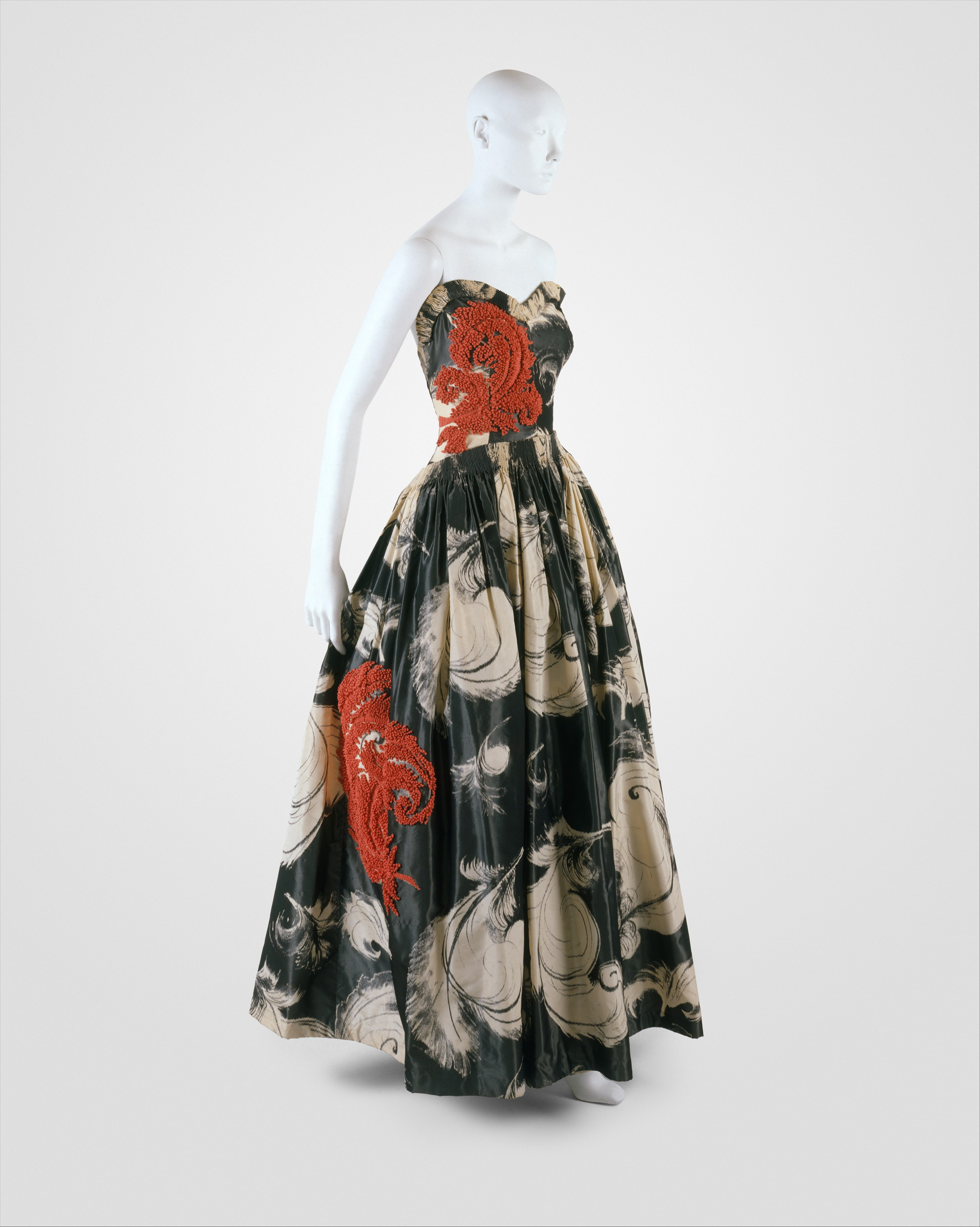
"Fusée", evening dress (silk), 1938

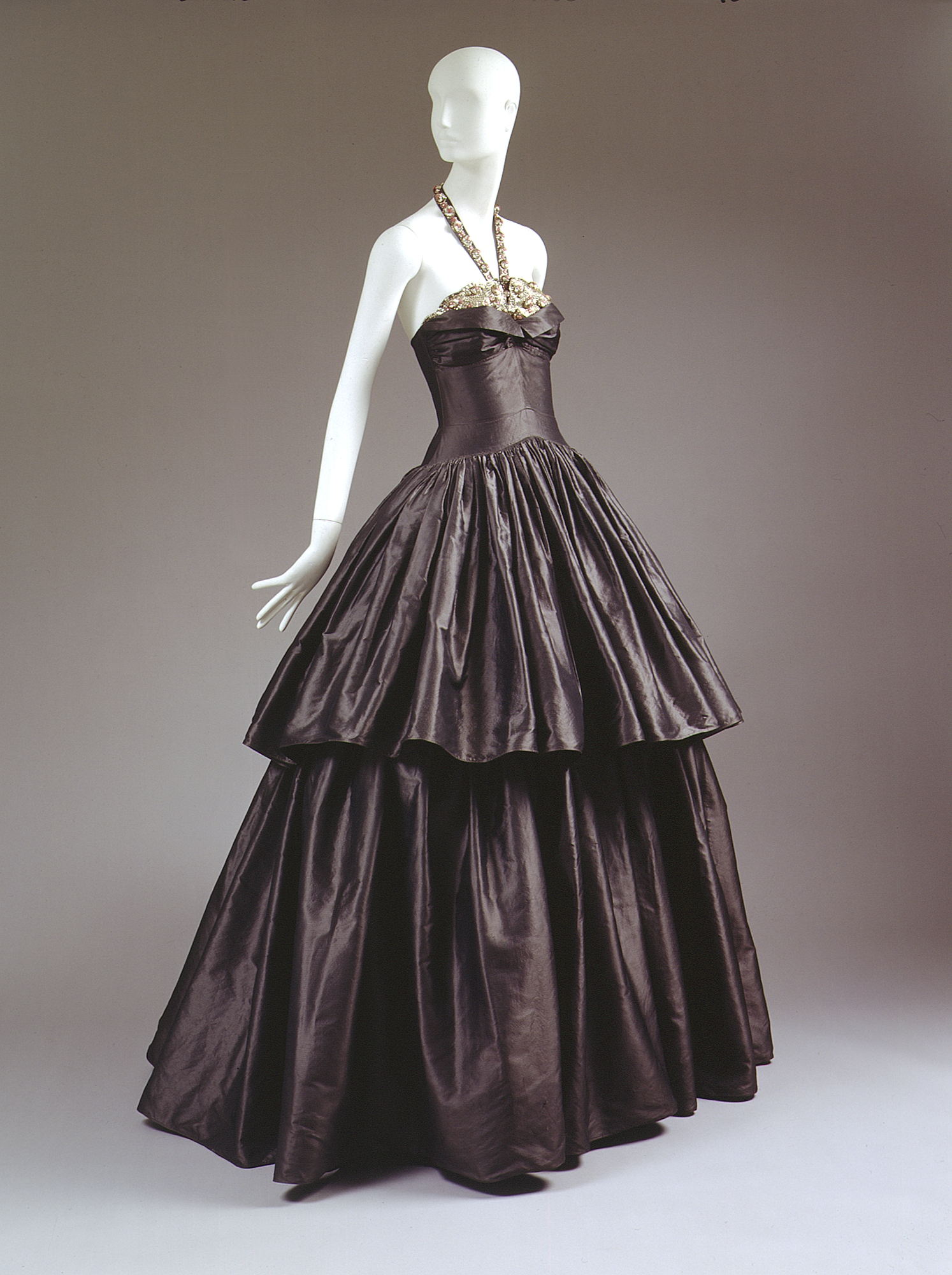
"Cyclone", evening dress (silk and spangles), 1939

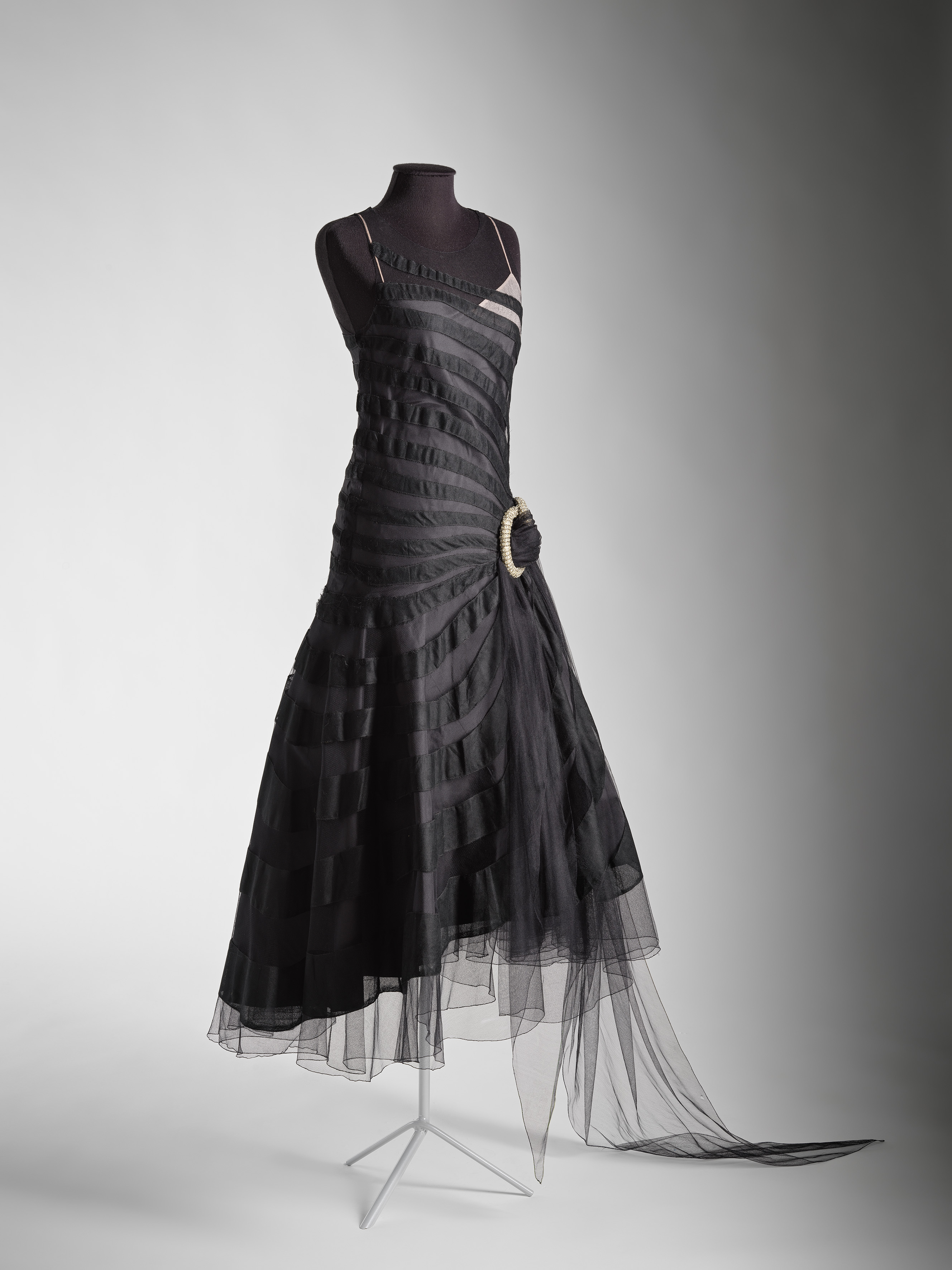
Japon, Lanvin, 1929 Marguerite de la nuit, MMH.2023.0008, Modemuseum Hasselt.

== Sources ==
- Colette, Emilio Terry, et al. (1965). Homage à Marie-Blanche, Comtesse Jean de Polignac, Monaco.
- "Jeanne Lanvin" and "Claude Montana" in Morgan, Ann (1984). Contemporary Designers, New York: Macmillan. | ISBN 0-333-33524-4
- "Castillo", "Jules-François Crahay", and "Jean Gaumont-Lanvin" in Remaury, Bruno, director (1994). Dictionnaire de la Mode au XXe Siècle, Paris: Éditions du Regard. | ISBN 2-84105-181-1
- Barillé, Elisabeth (1997). Lanvin, Paris: Assouline. | ISBN 2-84323-015-2)
- Picon, Jérôme (2002). Jeanne Lanvin, Paris: Flammarion. | ISBN 2-08-210044-8
- "Armand Albert Rateau" and "Jeanne Lanvin" in Byars, Mel (2004). The Design Encyclopedia, New York: The Museum of Modern Art. | ISBN 0-87070-012-X
- Menkes, Suzy (24 May 2005). "At Lanvin, a master of improvisation", International Herald Tribune.
