= Goga Ashkenazi =

Kazakh businesswoman and socialite

- Гога Ашкенази
- Born: Gaukhar Yerkinovna Berkalieva; 1 February 1980 (age 46); Taraz, Zhambyl Oblast, Kazakh Soviet Socialist Republic, Soviet Union
- Citizenship: Kazakh
- Education: Somerville College, Oxford
- Occupations: Entrepreneur; Businesswoman
- Spouse: Stefan Ashkenazy (m. 2003; div. 2007)
- Children: 2
- Relatives: Severyn Ashkenazy (former father-in-law)

Goga Ashkenazi (Russian: Гога Ашкенази; born Gauhar Erkınqyzy Berqalieva, (Note: Often transliterated as Gaukhar Yerkinovna Berkalieva through a Russified Romanization of Гаухар Еркиновна Беркалиева.) Kazakh: Гауһар Еркінқызы Берқалиева; 1 February 1980) is a Kazakh businesswoman and socialite. She is the founder and CEO of MunaiGaz Engineering Group, a Kazakh oil and gas conglomerate. From 2012 to 2023, she was head of the fashion label Vionnet, based in Milan.

== Early life and education ==
Ashkenazi was born in the Zhambyl Oblast, Kazakh Soviet Socialist Republic. She was raised in Moscow, where her father, engineer Yerkin Berkaliev, was a member of the Central Committee of the Communist Party under Mikhail Gorbachev. Her mother, Saule, has degrees in both engineering and medicine. She has a sister, Meruert, who is 10 years older.

After the fall of the Soviet Union in 1991, her family returned to Kazakhstan. Eager for their daughter to get a competitive education, her parents sent the 12-year-old Goga to boarding school in England. She first attended Buckswood Grange School in East Sussex followed by Stowe School. She then attended Rugby School, earning five A levels. She studied at Somerville College, Oxford, graduating in 2001 with a degree in modern history and economics.

== Career ==
After leaving Oxford, Ashkenazi worked at investment banking firms, including Merrill Lynch and Morgan Stanley in London and ABN AMRO in Hong Kong.

In 2003, Ashkenazi founded the MunaiGaz Engineering Group with her sister, Meruert. The company constructs compressor stations for gas pipelines and tunnelling operations for utility networks, gas turbine and diesel plants.

Ashkenazi bought and took over Vionnet in 2012. She said that she spent a year in Italy studying art, design, fashion and the Italian language. In April 2023, Vionnet was acquired by ChimHaeres.

Ashkenazi is also on the board of Ivanhoe Mining Group.

== Personal life ==
At age 23, she met and married American Stefan Ashkenazy, whose father Severyn Ashkenazy founded the L'Ermitage Hotel Group. The couple separated in 2004 and divorced in 2007, but she retained his last name, albeit with a different spelling due to a typo on her Russian passport. Her parents are both sworn atheists as members of the Communist Party, but her father is of Muslim background and Goga is Jewish through her maternal grandmother. Halachically Jewish, Goga notes she did not need to convert to marry Ashkenazy in a Jewish ceremony. She also says that in her purse she carries a page from a 1,200-year-old Torah.

Ashkenazi had an extramarital affair with billionaire Timur Kulibayev, the son-in-law of the president of Kazakhstan. She and Kulibayev have two sons: Adam, born in 2007 and Alan, born in 2012. She divides her time between Milan, where she works on Vionnet, and London, where her children live.

She is close friends with Prince Andrew, Duke of York, as well as banker Nathaniel Rothschild, real estate developer Nick Candy, Duran Duran band member Nick Rhodes and Lord Edward Spencer-Churchill.

Her first name, Gaukhar, means diamond in Kazakh, while her sister Meruert's name means pearl.
