= Vionnet (company) =

French-Italian luxury haute couture label

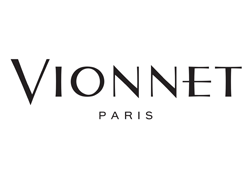
- Founded: 1912; 114 years ago, in Paris, France
- Founder: Madeleine Vionnet
- Headquarters: Milan, Italy
- Products: Luxury goods
- Parent: ChimHaeres Investment Holding
- Website: vionnet.com

Vionnet is an haute couture label founded by the French couturier Madeleine Vionnet. Established in 1912, the house of Vionnet closed doors in 1939.

Vionnet was relaunched by Guy and Arnaud de Lummen in the mid-1990s with perfumes and accessories, and then in 2006 with ready-to-wear collections. After being purchased by Kazakh businesswoman Goga Ashkenazi in 2012, the brand was acquired by Chimhaeres Investments in 2023.

== Original company ==
=== From 1912 to 1914 ===
The House of Vionnet opened in 1912 at 222, Rue de Rivoli. Madeleine Vionnet provided one-third of the financing while the remaining investment was supplied by one of her clients, Germaine Lilas, Henri's Lillas' daughter, the owner of the Parisian department store Bazar de l'Hôtel de Ville (BHV). In 1914, when World War I started, Madeleine Vionnet closed the house and set off to visit Rome.

=== From 1919 to 1940 ===
In 1919, the house reopened after the war. Mr. Martinez de Hoz, an Argentinian, joined Mr. Lillas as main shareholder of the house. During the same period, Thayaht, a futurist artist, created Vionnet's logo and started designing textiles, clothing and jewelry for the house.

In 1922, Théophile Bader, owner of the Galeries Lafayette, joined current shareholders Mr. de Hoz and Mr. Lillas in a new venture called Vionnet & Cie and became the majority shareholder. Few months later, on April 15, 1923, Vionnet's new premises opened at 50, Avenue Montaigne. The so-called "Temple of Fashion", a collaboration of architect Ferdinand Chanut, decorator George de Feure and crystal sculptor René Lalique, incorporated a spectacular Salon de Présentation and two boutiques: a fur salon and a lingerie salon. 1923 was a very active year for the house: Vionnet co-founded the first anticopyist Association (L'Association pour la Défense des Arts Plastiques et Appliqués), hosted in the House's premises and directed Vionnet & Cie's managing director; Vionnet introduced fingerprinted labels to authenticate models (each garment produced in Vionnet studios bears a label featuring Vionnet's original signing and an imprint of Vionnet's right thumb); Vionnet & Cie entered into a distribution arrangement with Charles and Ray Gutman, who own Charles & Ray Ladies' Tailors and Importers in New York City. In November, the first collection of Vionnet clothing shown at Charles and Ray was an enormous success.

In 1924, architect and designer Boris Lacroix was appointed art director of the House. From 1924 to 1937, he designed furniture, logos, printed textiles, handbags, accessories and took part in the planning of Vionnet's perfumes.

In the mid-1920s, the house was extremely active in the USA. In 1924, Vionnet & Cie signed an exclusive production and distribution agreement with Fifth Avenue retail store Hickson Inc. In February 1924, the Vionnet New York Salon opened at Hickson and an exclusive collection of gowns was presented. In 1925, Vionnet & Cie was the first French couture house to open a subsidiary in New York: Madeleine Vionnet Inc., located at 661 Fifth Avenue. The salon sold 'one-size-fits-all' designs with unfinished hems, to be adjusted to fit individual clients. Vionnet also produced ready-to-wear designs for US wholesale. Arguably the first prêt-à-porter ever made from Paris haute couture, the garments bore a label signed by Madeleine Vionnet along with "Repeated Original" as a trademark name.

During this time, in France, Vionnet opened a salon in the Grand Casino at Biarritz. in 1925, the house launched its first limited edition perfume comprising four fragrances named alphabetically: 'A', 'B', 'C' and 'D'. The geometrical bottle was designed by Boris Lacroix while the scent was made in collaboration with the House of Coty.

In 1927, Vionnet opened a school within her couture house to teach apprentices how to create clothing on the bias cut. In 1929, Vionnet led the establishment of a new anticopyist association, the P.A.I.S., directed by Armand Trouyet, managing director of Vionnet & Cie.

In 1932, the House acquired a new five-storey building at 50, Avenue Montaigne housing 21 workshops along with a clinic (equipped with both doctors and dentists) and a gymnasium. At this time, the house employed 1,200 seamstresses. Vionnet was one of the most important Parisian fashion houses of the 1930s. When World War II approached, a reorganization of the House was contemplated. Eventually, Vionnet decided to close her House. On August 2, 1939, Madeleine Vionnet showed her farewell collection.

=== Dormant period ===
In 1952, years after the closing of her house, Madeleine Vionnet donated most of her designs to the archives of the UFAC (today part of the Musée de la Mode et du Textile in Paris) including 120 dresses from 1921 to 1939.

== Revival ==
In 1988, the Vionnet label was acquired by the Lummen family. The family kept a low profile approach, avoiding new fashion collections and focusing on accessories and new perfumes (launch of "Madeleine Vionnet" in 1996 and "MV" in 1998).

=== 2006–2008 - The Lummen Era ===
In July 2006, following years of speculations, Arnaud de Lummen, CEO of the house, announced a return on the fashion scene. He promised "a unique and genuine approach to bring forward the Vionnet vision" and not a simple revival. Sophia Kokosalaki, then at the peak of her fame, was appointed Creative Director of the house. A debut clothing collection was launched for Spring/Summer 2007 - the first Vionnet clothing collection in 67 years.

The first new collection was unveiled to the public in December 2006 within the US edition of Vogue. From early 2007, this first new Vionnet collection became exclusively available in the house atelier in Paris and within Barneys New York flagship stores in the USA. Sophia Kokosalaki designed one more collection for the label before to be replaced in May 2007 by Marc Audibet, in an unexpected move from the house.

Marc Audibet, appointed as artistic advisor, presented its sole and unique collection for the house in October 2007. In her review of the collection, Suzy Menkes, fashion editor of the International Herald Tribune, stated: "Audibet has deeply understood the essence of Madeleine Vionnet."

From 2008, Vionnet collaborated with a pool of designers, without revealing their identities. Arnaud de Lummen told Women's Wear Daily that he wanted the focus to be on the label's expansion and not on the fame of its designers: "Vionnet doesn't need to be associated with a designer's name, it's an institution." To support such expansion, de Lummen approached several investors and one of them, Matteo Marzotto, eventually became a buyer. After initiating Vionnet's revival and heading the relaunch house, Arnaud de Lummen became an expert in reviving long dormant brands. Through Luvanis, he initiated Moynat's revival and acquired rights in sleeping beauty fashion brands such like Paul Poiret and Mainbocher.

From 2006 to 2008, Vionnet was established at 21, Place Vendôme in the former premises of Louise Chéruit and Elsa Schiaparelli. Vionnet produced made-in-France "demi-couture" collections closed to haute-couture in the prices featured and the techniques and textiles used. Vionnet involved historical partners of the house, such as the couture embroiderer Maison Lesage.

=== 2009–2011 - The Marzotto Era ===
On February 24, 2009, Matteo Marzotto announced the acquisition of the label and the creation of a new and independent structure in Milan where Vionnet is now operated. Matteo Marzotto, former General Manager and President of Valentino SpA, is one of the heirs of the Marzotto Group, a powerful textile group established in Italy since 1836. Matteo Marzotto also announced that some additional strategic development is to be provided by Gianni Castiglioni, CEO of the fashion brand Marni.

Rodolfo Paglialunga, formerly from Prada, became the new creative director of the house, introducing his first new collection in October 2009. In September, 2011, Vionnet announced that twin sisters Barbara and Lucia Croce as creative directors, replacing Rodolfo Paglialunga.

In December 2011, Vionnet unveiled its first directly owned stored in Milan.

Under the leadership of Marzotto, the list of celebrities dressed by Vionnet included Zoe Saldaña Diane Kruger, Madonna, Natalie Portman, Carey Mulligan, Emma Watson, Hilary Swank, Marion Cotillard, Catherine Zeta-Jones, Carey Mulligan, and Cameron Diaz.

=== 2012–2022 - The Ashkenazi Era ===
In May 2012, Kazakh-Russian businesswoman Goga Ashkenazi purchased a majority stake in the business before to take full control of the label in November of the same year.

From August 2012, Ashkenazi replaced the Croce sisters and assumed the creative direction of the label. In October 2012, she celebrated the 100th year of the brand with a demi-couture collection paying homage to the house's signature design.

In early January 2014, Vionnet announced hiring Hussein Chalayan to design the brand's demi-couture line. A first show took place on January 21, 2014. At the same time, Vionnet launched an advertising campaign shot by Jean-Paul Goude.

The company announced in October 2018 a voluntary liquidation. The purpose of the liquidation was to focus on restructuring the brand in order to fully commit to the cause of sustainability.

=== Since 2023 - The ChimHaeres Era ===
In April 2023, the brand was acquired by ChimHaeres, a joint venture investment company owned by Chimera Abu Dhabi and Haeres Capital.
