= High-low skirt =

Skirt with an asymmetrical hem

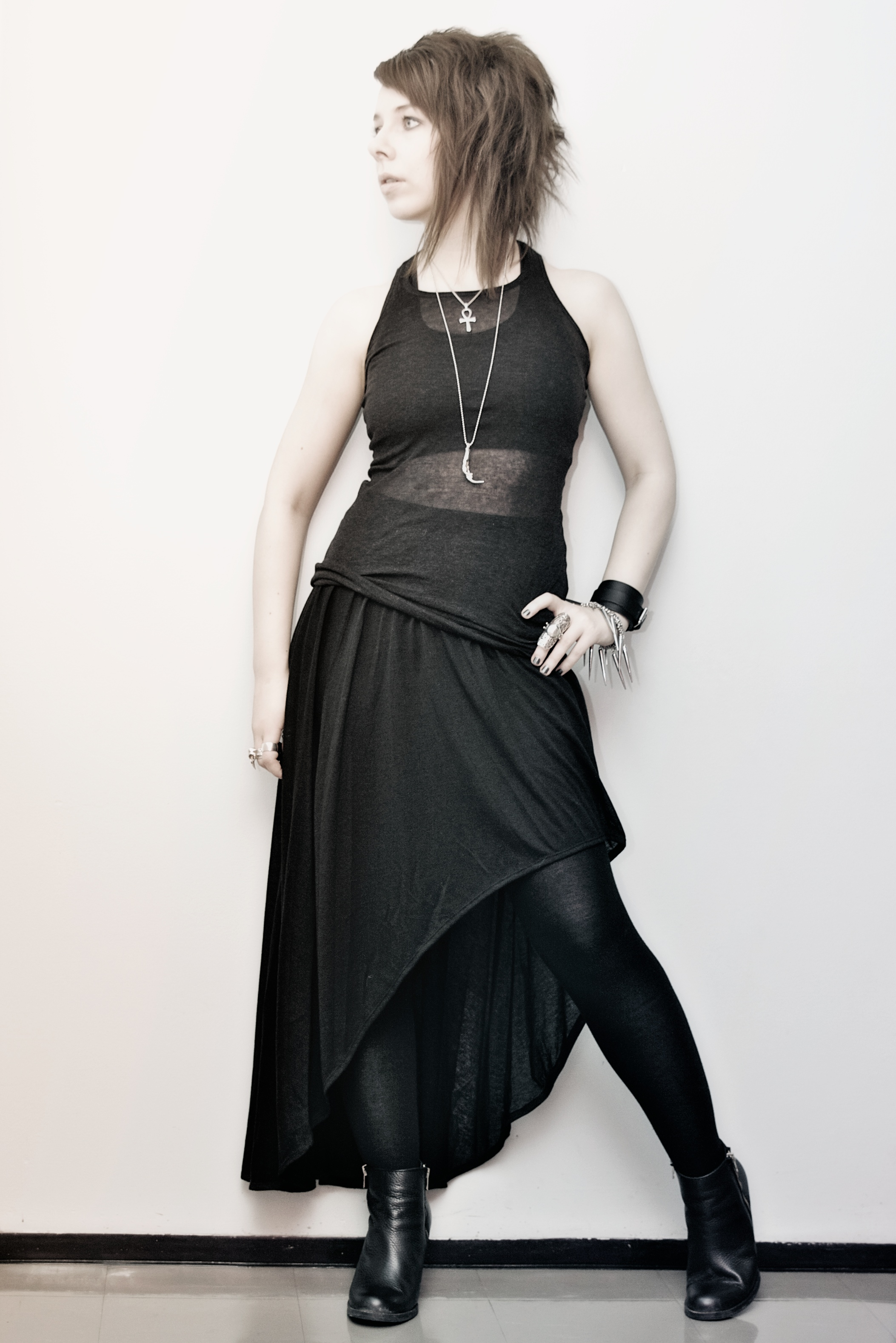
An example of a high-low skirt

High-low skirts, also known as asymmetrical, waterfall, or mullet skirts, are skirts with a hem that is higher in the front, or side, than in the back.

== History ==
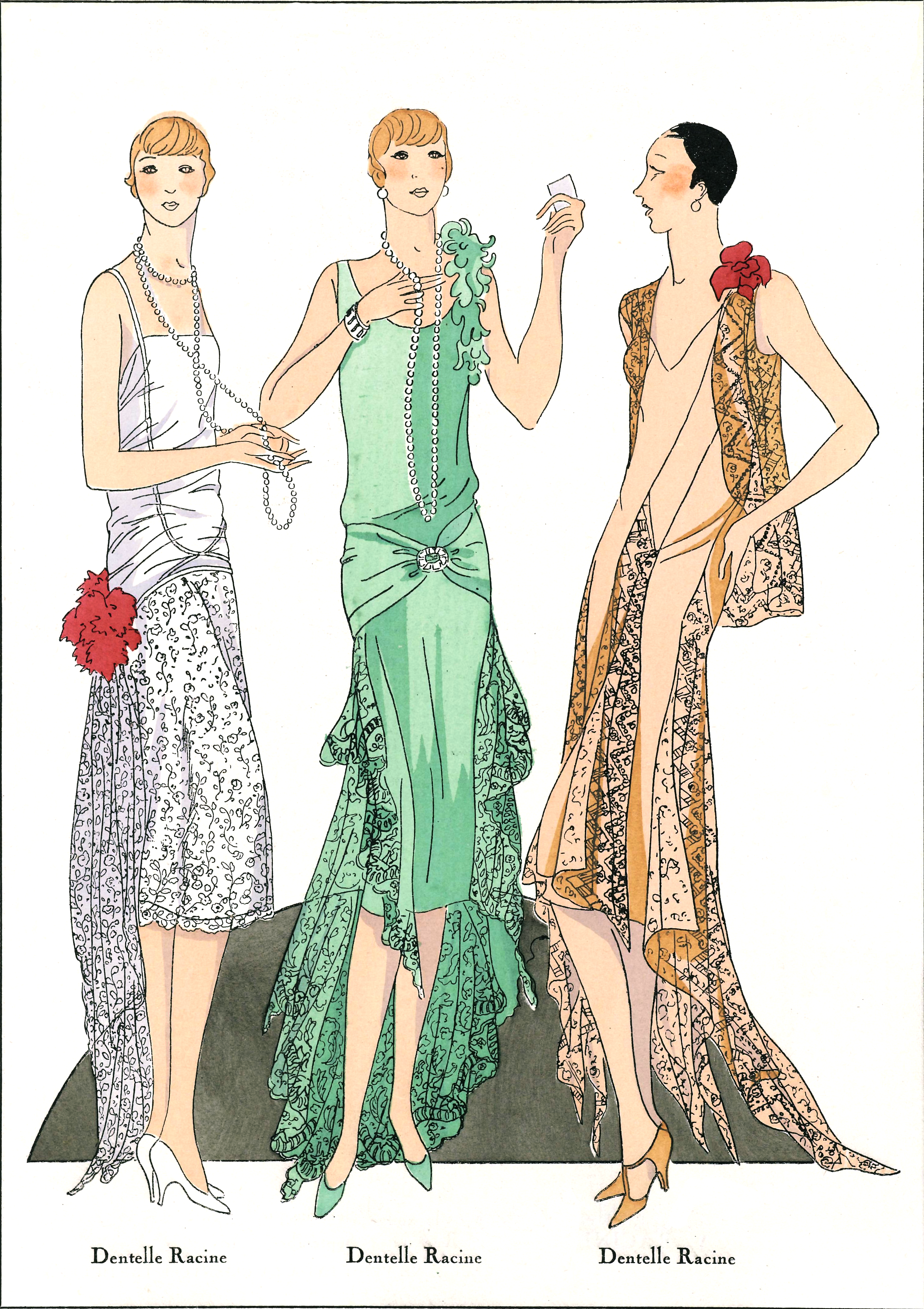
Evening dresses designed by Racine, showcasing lace high-low-skirts. Art-Goût-Beauté, 1929

The high-low skirt has a full circle hem. However, the length varies from short in front to long in back. The style originates in Victorian era dresses and formal gowns, when the hem style became known as the "fishtail". During the 19th century, it became a trend in the mid-1870s, reappearing in the early 1880s, and later in women's formal gowns and evening dresses throughout the 20th century, particularly in the late 1920s and early 1930s, where lowering hemlines were a mask that would start off 1930s silhouettes.

The recent high-low skirt hem trend began in late 2011. The high-low skirt became a trend in Europe and America in late 2011, eventually becoming a worldwide fashion in Spring and Summer 2012. It has received fashion press coverage in India, such as in the fashion labels Namrata Joshipura and Myoho, being praised for its "playfulness". It received widespread visibility outside of fashion circles after The Voice contestant Devyn DeLoera wore a peach-coloured high-low skirt for her audition in summer 2012.

The skirt style has been given a variety of names by designers and the press, including asymmetrical and waterfall, with the most common and derisive term being "mullet skirt", used by Britain's Mirror newspaper in criticising a version worn by singer Cher Lloyd in April 2012, a mocking reference to the now unfashionable mullet hairstyle that was a brief men's fad in the 1980s. However, some high-low dress wearers have embraced the term, referring to their own dress as a mullet dress.

== Asymmetric peplum trend ==
A related trend in 2011 and 2012 is the asymmetric peplum hem on shirts, sweaters and jackets for women. The peplum, a broad ruffled hem that is fitted at the waist and flares outward, has been a recurring fashion trend in Europe for centuries, and was last popular in Europe and North America during the 1940s and 1950s. An asymmetric version has been brought to women's fashion in 2012, but not all consumers find it flattering, with one American stating, "I do not believe it hides large hips and behinds, and the new asymmetrical peplums should only be worn by the tall and thin".

== See also ==
- Handkerchief hem
- Skirt
- Hem
