= Marie-Louise Bruyère =

French fashion designer (1884 - 1959)

Marie-Louise Bruyère in 1950

Marie-Louise Bruyère (6 October 1883 – ), mostly known as Madame Bruyère, was a French fashion designer of the 1930s, 1940s and 1950s, operating out of Paris and importing her fashion lines abroad.

== Biography ==
Bruyère was born in France in 1884, and died after 1959.

== Fashion career ==
Before Bruyère opened her haute couture house in 1928, she learned her trade from Callot Soeurs and Jeanne Lanvin. Her establishment was located on the Place Vendôme in Paris. An early collection in 1930 established Bruyère as comparable to Schiaparelli, Alix, Rochas and Mainbocher, with her coats and tailored suits proving a particular strength. Her suits were particularly noted for their subtle and unusual design elements. In August 1932 Fortune noted that her designs were rather more successful with Americans than with the French, who did not visit Bruyère's shop on the Rue de Mondovi. Bruyère's designs were imported to the United States, and in 1932, Fortune noted that a survey of copies of Paris couture gowns in the stores of Manhattan showed that Bruyère was the third most popular name, behind Vionnet and Lanvin.

Bruyère continued to present collections during the German occupation, now taking into account the needs of Frenchwomen who needed practical clothing that could handle the bitter winters and harsh realities of life while occupied.

After the war ended, Bruyère was not a supporter of the full-skirted New Look as popularised by Christian Dior, instead offering extremely simple, slim-line dresses and suits with plunging necklines in 1951.

In the 1950s, Bruyère began to focus on ready-to-wear clothing. She came to an agreement in 1951 with the Baron-Peters dress firm in the United States to reproduce her designs for the American medium-priced ready-to-wear market, carefully emphasising that the designs were pure replicas of her Paris collection, and not "whipped up for American tastes." In 1952 it was noted that most of Bruyère's business came from American clients.

In 1958, Bruyère was noted alongside a number of other female Parisian fashion designers, her designs described as flowing and ladylike, and worn by many famous actresses and socialites. She is thought to have ceased business during the 1950s.
