= Severyn Ashkenazy =

Polish-American hotelier, philanthropist

- Born: 1936 (age 89–90); Tarnopol, Poland
- Education: University of Paris; UCLA
- Occupations: Hotelier, philanthropist
- Children: 4, including Sev Aszkenazy
- Relatives: Goga Ashkenazi (former daughter-in-law)

Severyn Ashkenazy (born 1936) is a Polish-born American hotelier.

== Early life ==
Severyn Ashkenazy was born in 1936 in Tarnopol, then part of Poland, now in Western Ukraine. He has a brother, Arnold. Their father, Izador Ashkenazy, was an art collector who owned paintings by Matisse, Monet, Gauguin, Picasso, and Manet.

During World War II, he and his family hid in the cellar in the house of Polish peasant family in the countryside, who despite being fully aware of death penalty for helping Jews provided Ashkenazy's immediate and extended family (8 people in total) with shelter for over 20 months.

After the war, he moved to France, where he received a Bachelor of Arts degree in literature from the University of Paris. He then attended graduate school at the University of California, Los Angeles (UCLA) for four years, where he was a PhD candidate.

== Career ==
He developed L'Ermitage Beverly Hills with his brother Arnold, which opened in 1976. As of 1989, he co-owned it with his brother, as well as the Bel Age and Mondrian hotels.

Meanwhile, his brother Arnold Ashkenazy purchased paintings by "Vincent van Gogh, Pablo Picasso, Raoul Dufy, Maurice de Vlaminck, Stanton Macdonald-Wright, John Altoon, Saul Steinberg, and California impressionist William Wendt, and lithographs by Joan Miró, Marc Chagall and Alexander Calder." The brothers hung many of their paintings on the walls of their hotels.

He is the founder and chairman emeritus of Small Luxury Hotels of the World.

He is the founder of the Beit Warszawa Association, Heritage and Rebirth, Beit Polska and Beit Warszawa foundations, and Friends of Jewish Renewal in Poland.

== Personal life ==
He has a son, Sev Aszkenazy, who is a real estate developer in San Fernando, California. Whilst a UCLA student in 1960, Ashkenazy was involved with a Mexican American woman and left before the baby was born. His mother slightly changed the surname and brought him up as a Catholic. He finally met his father when he was in his 20s, and worked for him for six years, before starting Pueblo Contracting and Aszkenazy Development in San Fernando.

His son, Stefan Ashkenazy, was married to the Kazakh businesswoman and socialite Goga Ashkenazi from 2003 to 2007, and they have a son, Adam.
