= Kate Reily =

British dressmaker

Kate Reily was a noted British dressmaker, active in the late 19th- and early 20th-century.

She had a shop at 11-12 Dover Street, London. A New York branch of the enterprise was located at 277 Fifth Avenue, and a Chicago store was at 1305 Michigan Avenue.

Reily designed dresses worn by bridesmaids at the elaborate 1889 wedding of Lord William Nevill and Miss Luisa Maria Carmen de Murrieta, at Brompton Oratory in London. The dresses were described in The New York Times as "white silk dresses edged with otter fur" worn with "mouse-colored velvet hats with ostrich plumes."

The New York Times reported in 1894 that the American branch of the business was purchased by the New York firm of Ehrich Brothers, which made "magnificent costumes" available "for only a fraction of the original price." A labeled dress by Reily, a pale green silk satin with a brocaded floral and vine design, lace trim at the neckline and cuffs, net inserts at the neckline, and a wide satin sash with metal tassels, is in the collection of the Staten Island Historical Society (Staten Island, New York City).

Early in her career, the French designer Madeleine Vionnet (1876–1975) worked as a fitter with Reily.
