= Sophia Kokosalaki =

Greek fashion designer (1972–2019)

- Σοφία Κοκοσαλάκη
- Born: 3 November 1972; Athens, Greece
- Died: 13 October 2019 (aged 46); London, England
- Education: University of Athens; Central Saint Martins College of Art and Design
- Occupation: Fashion designer
- Children: 1

Sophia Kokosalaki (Greek: Σοφία Κοκοσαλάκη; 3 November 1972 – 13 October 2019) was a Greek fashion designer based in London.

== Biography ==
Born in Athens, of Cretan origin, Kokosalaki studied Greek and English literature at the University of Athens, before moving to London, where she graduated from the Central Saint Martins College of Art and Design.

== Career ==
Kokosalaki started her eponymous label in London in 1999. She received an Elle designer award and the Art Foundation award for fashion in 2002 and a new generation designer award in 2004, and had regular editorial from Vogue, Harper's Bazaar and W magazines.

In 2004, she was commissioned to design outfits for the opening and closing ceremonies at the 2004 Summer Olympic Games, which were staged in her home town of Athens. Over six thousand people were dressed by Kokosalaki for the opening ceremony, most notably the singer Björk who performed "Oceania" in an enormous ocean-inspired dress composed of many pleats and folds.

Briefly, between 2006 and 2007, Kokosalaki was the first creative director of the relaunched Vionnet fashion house. Although Kokosalaki cites Madeleine Vionnet as one of her favourite historical couturiers, and her work was well-received, she was ultimately disappointed by the experience, and left after two collections to focus on her own label.

Her style often featured classic Grecian draping combined with hand-crafted elements. While Kokosalaki was particularly known for draped, softly flowing dresses, her designs could also be architectural and heavily textured, and she worked in leather and tougher fabrics as well.

== Personal life ==
Kokosalaki, who was married, with one daughter, died on 13 October 2019 after a brief illness with cancer.
