= Marcelle Chaumont =

French fashion designer

Marcelle Chaumont (born 1891, Eymoutiers, Haute-Vienne; died 1990, Paris) was a French fashion designer.

Chaumont moved to Paris after World War I and became the head seamstress for Jeanne Lanvin and Madeleine Vionnet. Marcelle Chaumont created her fashion house in the late 1930s but World War II and health problems forced her to stop working. Her clients included Gloria Guinness who was voted 'Best Dressed Woman' by Time magazine in 1962. Some of Chaumont's creations can be seen at the Metropolitan Museum of Art of New York The house of Marcelle Chaumont closed in 1953.

Chaumont was married to Robert Chapsal, son of the politician Fernand Chapsal and was the mother of the writer Madeleine Chapsal.
