= Madeleine Chapsal =

French writer (1925–2024)

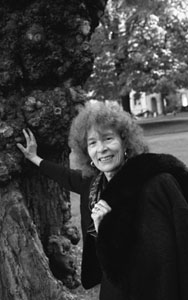
Chapsal in 1995

Madeleine Chapsal (1 September 1925 – 11 or 12 March 2024) was a French writer and the daughter of Robert Chapsal, son of the politician Fernand Chapsal, and of Marcelle Chaumont, who made dresses for Madeleine Vionnet.

== Biography ==
Madeleine Chapsal was born in Paris on 1 September 1925. She married the French journalist and politician Jean-Jacques Servan-Schreiber in 1947 with whom she participated in the creation of the news magazine L'Express. She was a member of the Prix Femina jury between 1981 and 2006. Chapsal died in the night of 11 to 12 March 2024, at the age of 98.

== Bibliography ==
=== Novels ===
- 1973: Un été sans histoire
- 1974: Je m'amuse et je t'aime
- 1976: Grands cris dans la nuit du couple
- 1979: Une femme en exil
- 1980: Un homme infidèle
- 1986: La maison de jade
- 1987: Adieu l'amour
- 1988: Douleur d'août and Une saison de feuilles
- 1990: Le retour du bonheur and Si aimée si seule
- 1991: On attend les enfants and "La chair de la robe"
- 1992: La femme abandonnée and Mère et filles
- 1993: Suzanne et la province
- 1994: L'Inventaire
- 1995: Une femme heureuse
- 1996: Le foulard bleu and Reviens Simone
- 1997: Un été sans toi, Un bouquet de violettes, La maîtresse de mon mari and Les amoureux
- 1998: Cet homme est marié, La mieux aimée and Défense d'aimer
- 1999: L'Embellisseur, L'indivision and Meurtre en Thalasso
- 2000: Dans la tempête, Divine passion, J'ai toujours raison, Jeu de femme and Nos jours heureux
- 2001: Deux femmes en vue, La Femme sans, La Maison and Les chiffons du rêve
- 2002: L'amour n'a pas de saison and Nos enfants si gâtés
- 2003: La Ronde des âges
- 2005: Un oncle à héritage and Les roses de Bagatelle
- 2006: Le Charme des liaisons and Affaires de cœur
- 2007: Un amour pour trois, La Femme à l'écharpe and Il vint m'ouvrir la porte
- 2008: C'est tout un roman, Une balle près de cœur and Méfiez-vous des jeunes filles
- 2009: Le Bonheur dans le mariage
- 2010: Madeleine Vionnet ma mère et moi: L'éblouissement de la haute couture
- 2010: A qui tu penses quand tu me fais l'amour ?
- 2011: Deux sœurs and La Mort rôde

=== Essays ===
- 1960: Vérités sur les jeunes filles and Les Écrivains en personne
- 1963: Quinze écrivains : entretiens
- 1970: Les Professeurs pour quoi faire ?, with Michèle Manceaux
- 1977: La Jalousie
- 1984: Envoyez la petite musique
- 1986: L'Élégance des années 50
- 1989: La Chair de la robe
- 1990: Le Retour du bonheur
- 1991: L'Ami chien
- 1993: Oser écrire
- 1994: Ce que m'a appris Françoise Dolto and L'Inondation
- 1995: Une soudaine solitude
- 1996: La Femme en moi
- 1997: Ils l'ont tuée and Les Amis de passage
- 1998: Les Plus belles lettres d'amour
- 1999: Si je vous dis le mot passion et Trous de mémoire
- 2002: Callas l'extrême and Conversations impudiques
- 2003: Dans mon jardin and Mes éphémères
- 2005: Le Certain âge
- 2007: Apprendre à aimer
- 2009: Madeleine Vionnet

=== Testimonies ===
- 2002: Conversations impudiques, with Edouard Servan-Schreiber
- 2004: L'Homme de ma vie and Noces avec la vie
- 2006: Journal d'hier et d'aujourd'hui
- 2007: L'Exclusion
- 2008: Journal d'hier et d'aujourd'hui II
- 2009: Journal d'hier et d'aujourd'hui III
- 2011: Ces voix que j'entends encore
- 2012: David

=== Children books ===
- 1971: Alphabêtes, Les Éléphants magiques, La Fleur du soleil, Le Poisson voyageur and Hop la ! dans un ciel de printemps
- 1972: Mimichat, Nourson and Le Chien jaune
- 1973: Un anniversaire chez les dragons
- 1978: Attention au loup !
- 2009: Bzzi-Bzzi vole dans la prairie

=== Theater ===
- 1985: Un flingue sous les roses
- 1989: Quelques pas sur la terre
- 1998: Combien de femmes pour faire un homme ? and En scène pour l'entracte

=== Poetry ===
- 1981: Divine passion
- 1996: Paroles amoureuses

=== Audiobook ===
- 1986: La Maison de Jade, read by the author

=== Documentaries ===
- 1961: Le Temps du ghetto by Frédéric Rossif
- 1963: Mourir à Madrid by Frédéric Rossif
- 1967: Révolution d'octobre by Frédéric Rossif
- 1976: La Fête sauvage by Frédéric Rossif
- 1991: Les Animaux by Frédéric Rossif

=== Film adaptations ===
- 1982: Une autre femme by Hélène Misserly
- 1988: La Maison de Jade by Nadine Trintignant
- 1989: Une saison de feuilles by Serge Leroy
- 1992: La Femme abandonnée by Édouard Molinaro
- 1996: La Dernière fête by Pierre Granier-Deferre
- 1998: L'Inventaire by Caroline Huppert

=== Awards ===
- "Officier de la Légion d'honneur"
- "Grand croix de l'ordre national du Mérite" (la décoration lui a été remise à l'Élysée le 28 septembre 2011 en présence notamment de Liliane Bettencourt)
