= Callot Soeurs =

French fashion house

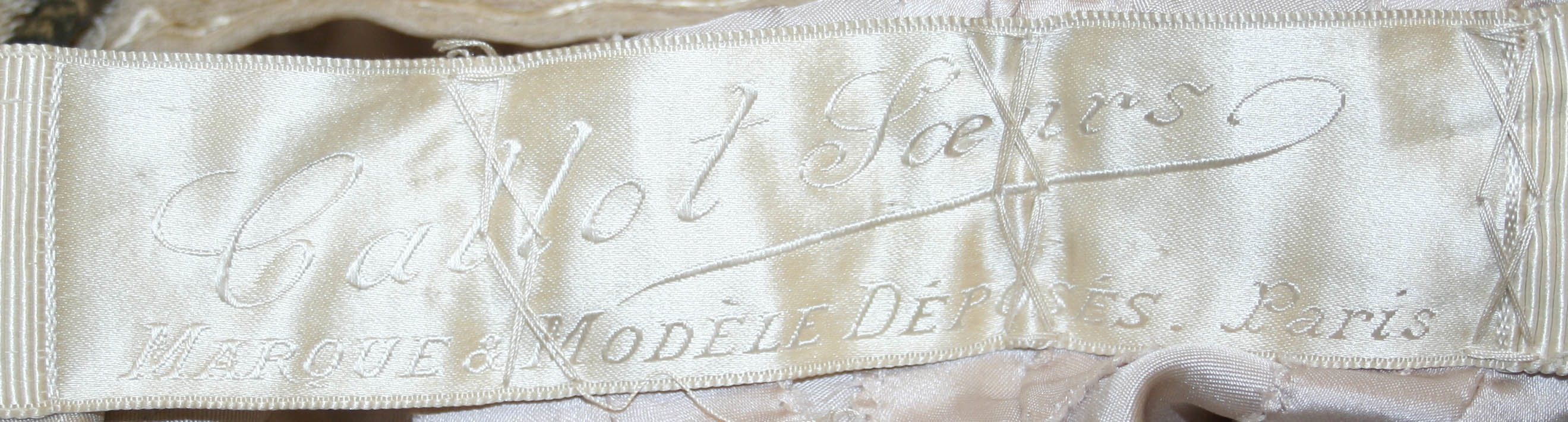
Callot Soeurs dress label

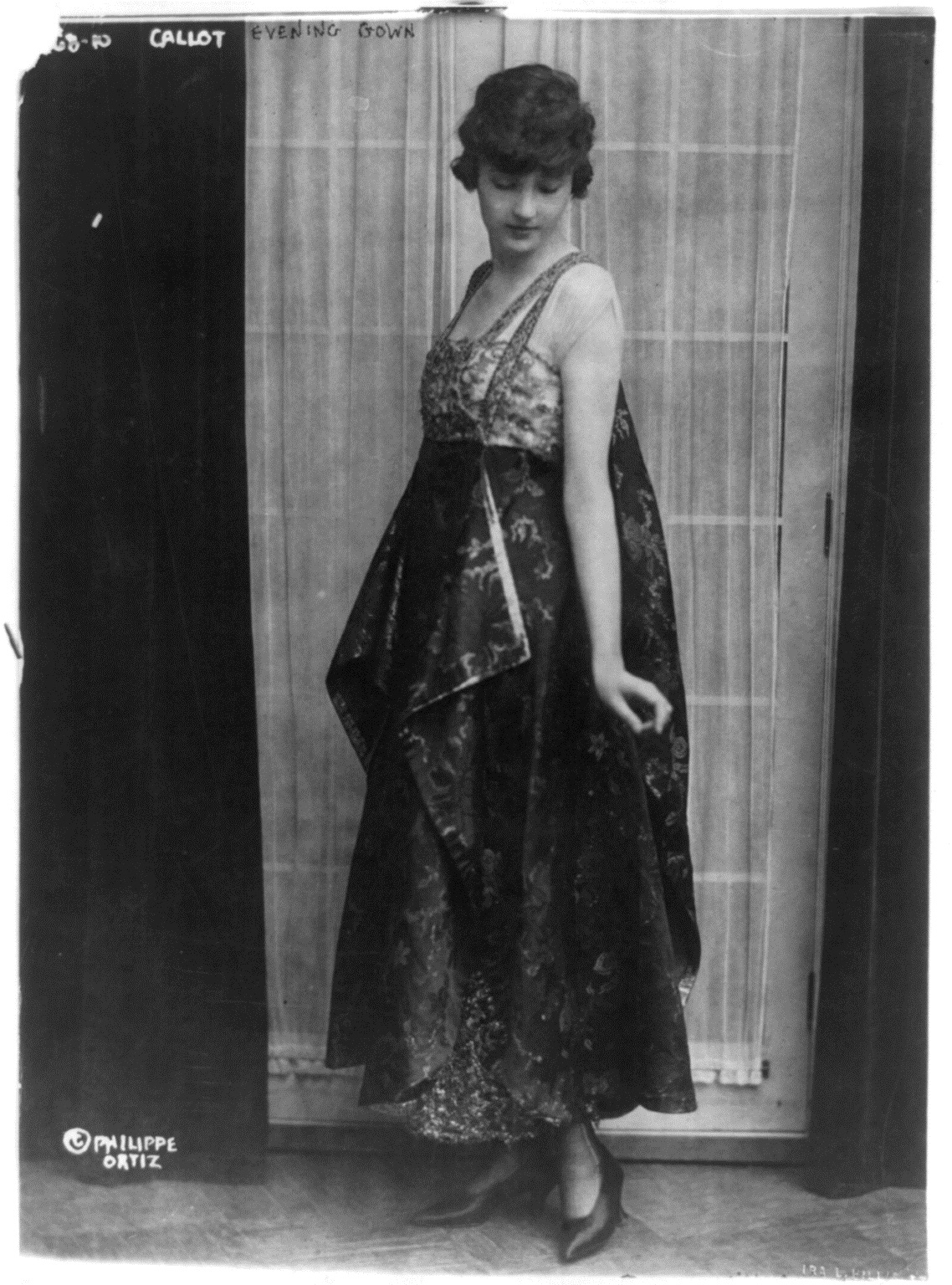
A Callot Soeurs dress, circa 1915

Callot Soeurs (French pronunciation: [kalo sœʁ]) was one of the leading fashion design houses of the 1910s and 1920s.

== Origins ==
Callot Soeurs opened in 1895 at 24, rue Taitbout in Paris, France. It was operated by the four Callot sisters: Marie Callot Gerber, Marthe Callot Bertrand, Regina Callot Tennyson-Chantrell and Joséphine Callot Crimon.

The eldest sister, Marie, was trained in dressmaking, having earlier worked for Raudnitz and Co., prominent Parisian dressmakers, and they were all taught by their mother, a lacemaker. The sisters began working with antique laces and ribbons to enhance blouses and lingerie. Their success led to an expansion into other clothing.

In 1897, Joséphine was rumored to have committed suicide. There is no substantiated proof and family members believe her death was accidental.

== Growth and peak ==
In 1900, they were featured at the Paris World's Fair. That year, they had a staff of two hundred and did two million francs in sales. By 1901, they had tripled their workforce and doubled their sales.

Callot Soeurs's day dresses were well received at the 1915 Universal Exhibition in San Francisco. In 1916, Henri Bendel was the largest buyer of Callot Soeurs in New York City. That same year, American Vogue dubbed the sisters the Three Fates, and declared them "foremost among the powers that rule the destinies of a woman's life and increase the income of France."

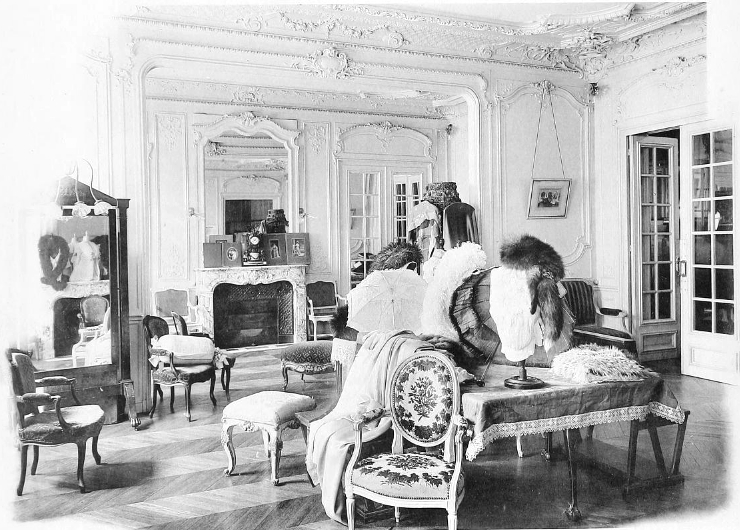
The sales room of the haute couture house Callot Soeurs, c.1910.

During World War I, American support was vital to the continued success of Callot Soeurs. While European sales fell, American buyers would order between 300 and 800 pieces every July. In response to the proliferation of knockoffs in the 1910s and 1920s, Callot Soeurs regularly placed advertisements in The New York Times listing the official retailers of their designs.

In 1919, Callot Soeurs moved to larger premises at 9-11 Avenue Matignon.

In 1920, Marthe Callot Bertrand suddenly died and the widowed Regina Callot Tennyson-Chantrell retired to care for her son. Marie Callot Gerber single-handedly ran the house for the next seven years.

In the 1920s, Callot Soeurs established branches in Nice, Biarritz, Buenos Aires, and London. A January 1922 article in Ladies' Home Journal claimed that "Callot probably has more rich clients than any other establishment in the world. They come from South America, from South Africa, and as far east as Japan."

In 1926, the American designer Elizabeth Hawes, while working in Paris, regularly wore Callot Soeurs. Hawes insisted that people should wear what they personally liked, not what was considered fashionable, and although some American buyers at that time considered Callot Soeurs' dresses out of date and unfashionable, she happily wore their "simple clothes with wonderful embroidery" that lasted her for several years.

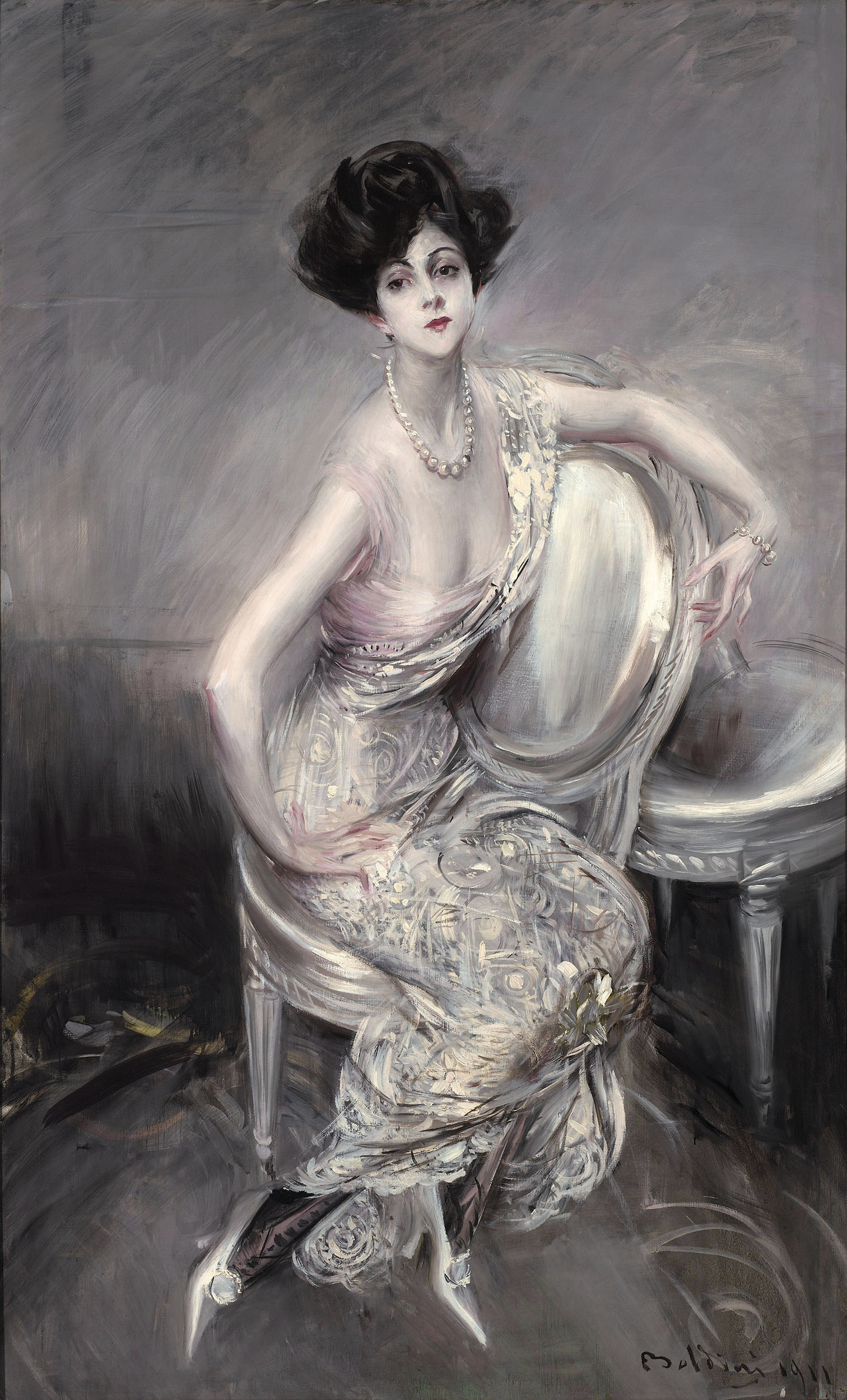
Portrait of Rita de Acosta Lydig by Giovanni Boldini, 1911

Callot Soeurs's greatest American supporter was Rita de Acosta Lydig who ordered dozens of dresses at a time. According to her sister Mercedes de Acosta, "Rita designed most of her own clothes and they were made for her by Callot Soeurs." Supposedly, Rita was such a fashion plate that when she learned her husband was having an affair with a poorly dressed woman, she sent the mistress to Callot Soeurs for new clothing. Rita wore a silver Callot Soeurs dress when she posed for Giovanni Boldini in 1911.

== Later history ==
Marie Callot Gerber died in 1927. Her obituary in Le Figaro commented: "One of the most beautiful figures of the Parisian luxury business has now disappeared."

In 1928, Pierre Gerber, Marie Callot Gerber's son, took over the business but could not survive in the highly competitive market and, in 1937, the House of Callot Soeurs closed and was absorbed into the House of Calvet (Marie-Louise Calvet); under the Callot label. However, World War II made matters difficult in France. Similarly to what happened with the House of Vionnet in 1939, Calvet and the Callot label finally closed in 1952.

== Influence and legacy ==
The couturier Madeleine Vionnet was head seamstress at Callot. It was here that she refined her technique in couture. She explained that "Without the example of the Callot Soeurs, I would have continued to make Fords. It is because of them that I have been able to make Rolls-Royces." Marie-Louise Bruyère was another designer who trained with the Callot Soeurs.

Callot Soeurs clothing was known for its exotic detail. They were among the first designers to use gold and silver lamé to make dresses.

Twenty-one Callot Soeurs dresses are preserved in the Acton Art Collection at New York University's Villa La Pietra in Florence. Additional dresses are held by the Metropolitan Museum of Art, the Philadelphia Museum of Art, the Museum at FIT, Palais Galliera, the Victoria and Albert Museum, The Kyoto Costume Institute, LACMA, the Indianapolis Museum of Art and the Ulster Museum, Belfast

== Gallery ==
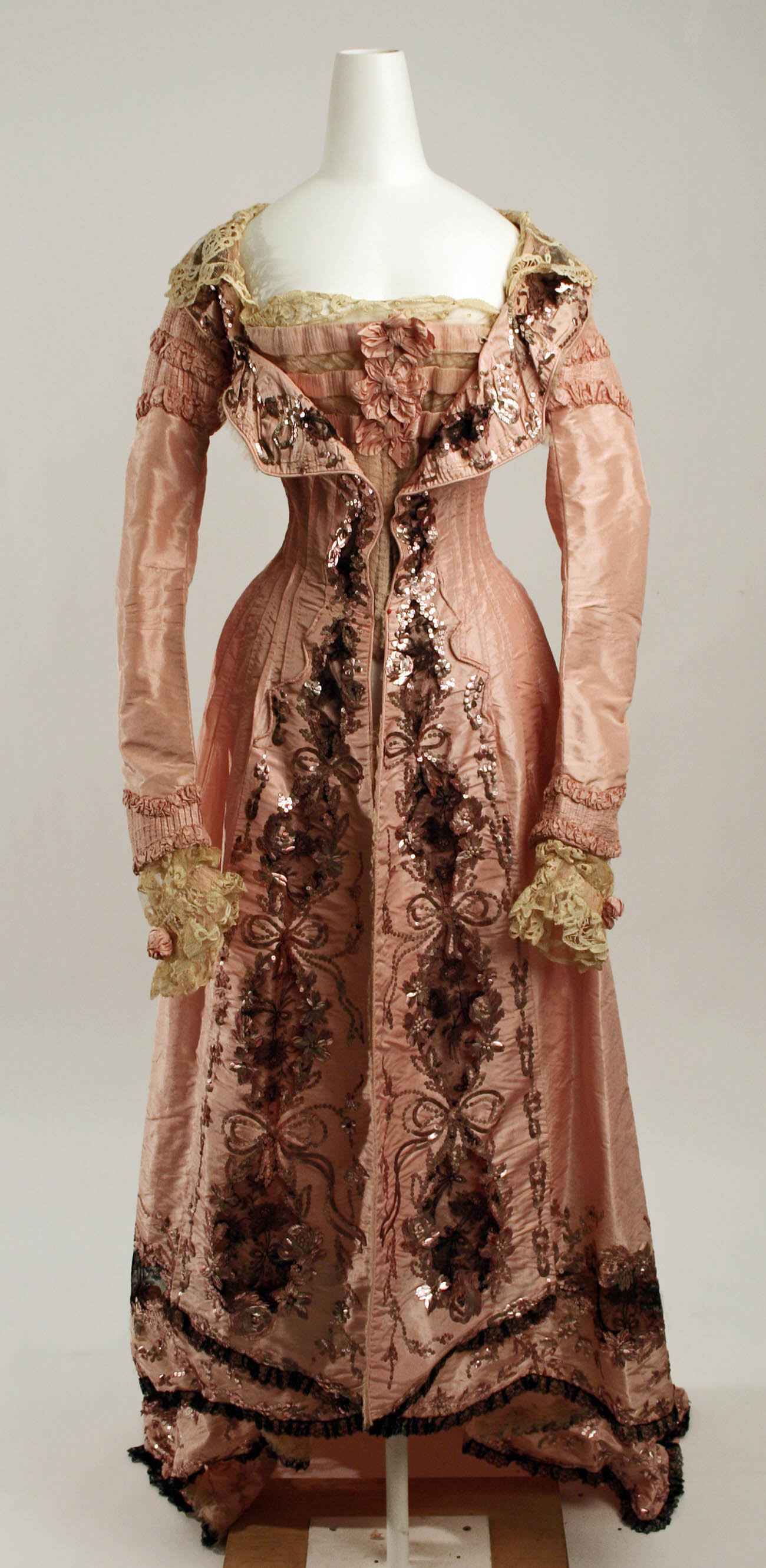
Negligee, 1898-1902

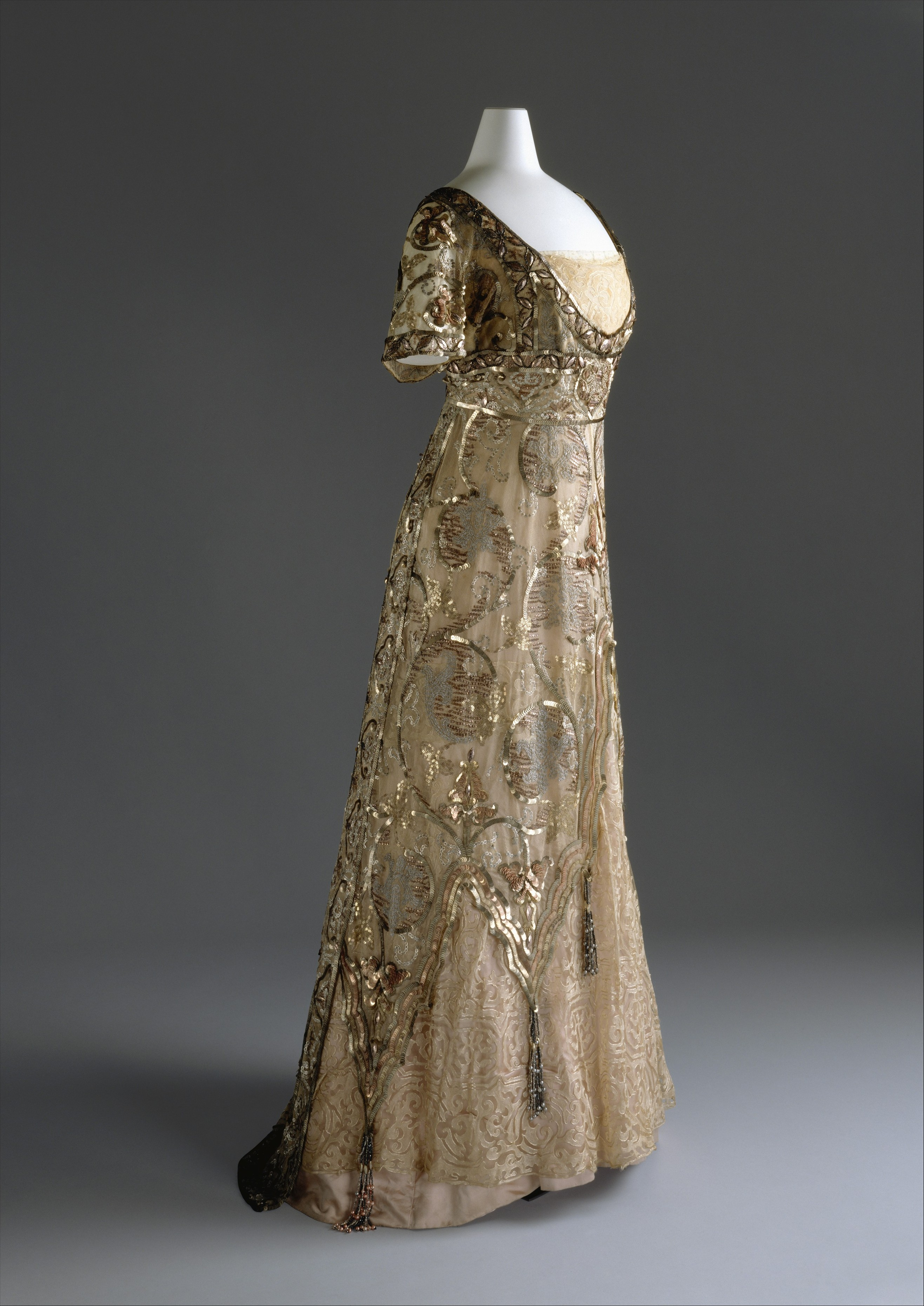
Evening dress, 1910-1914

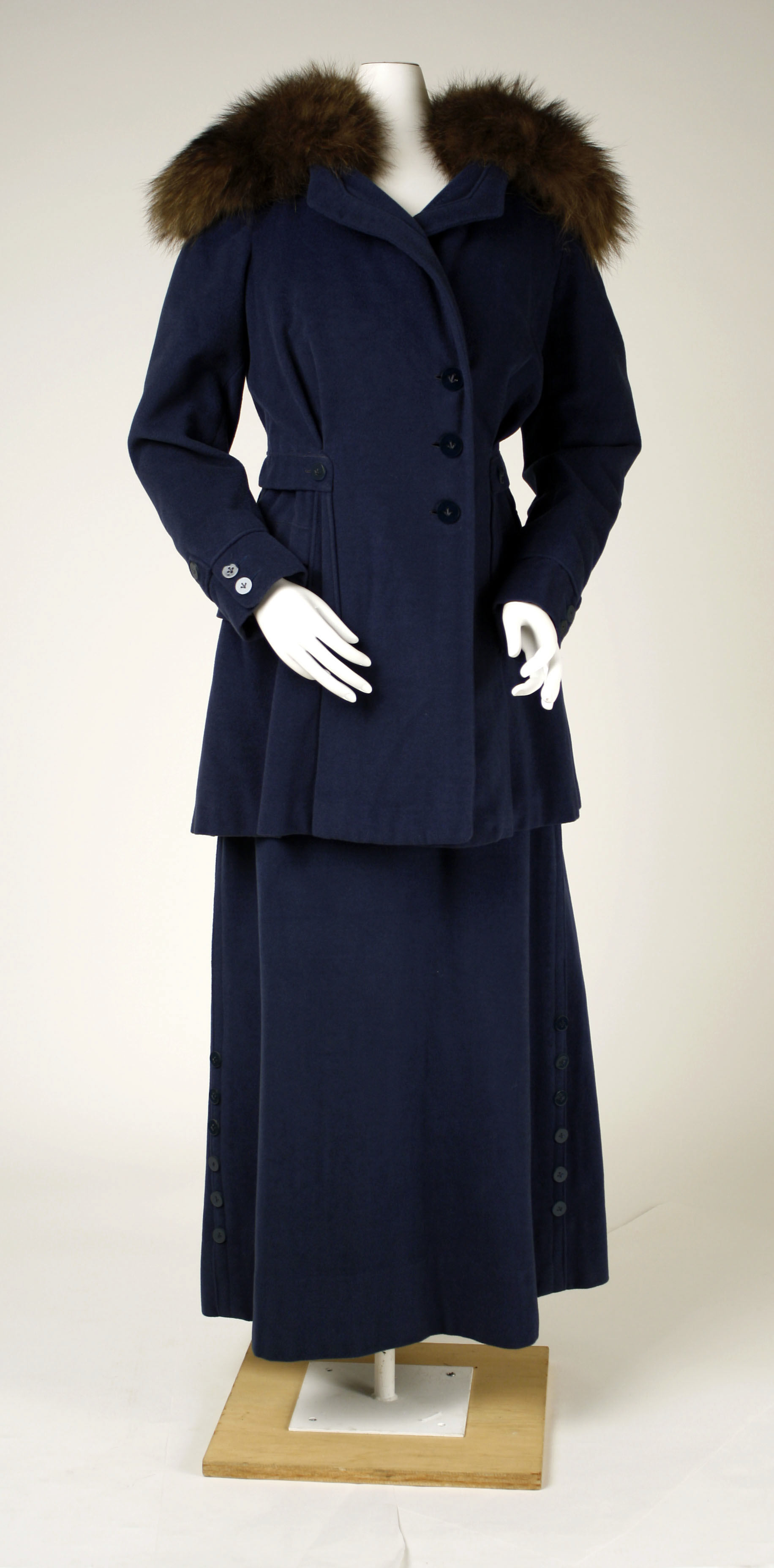
Suit, 1917

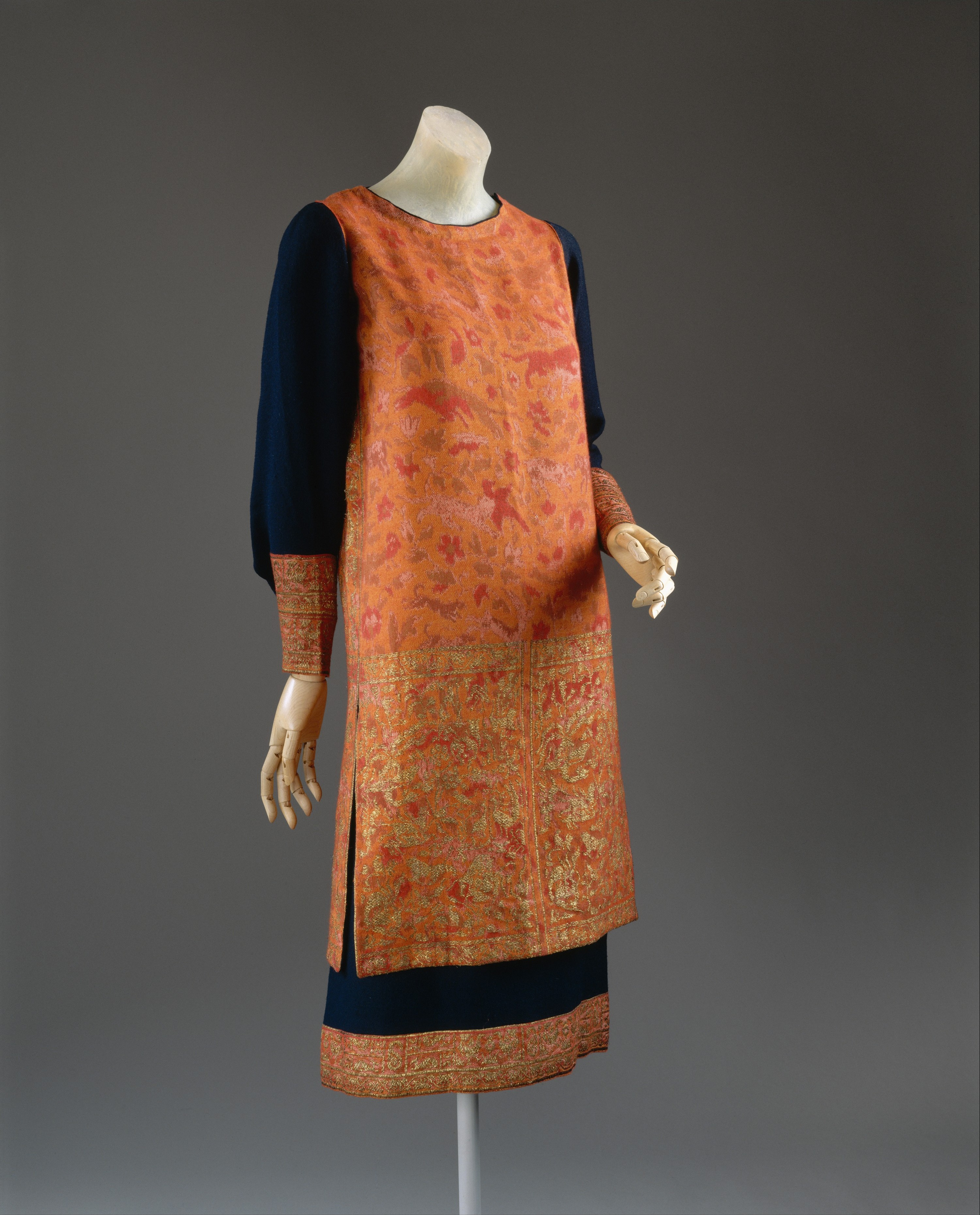
day dress with collarless tunic, ca 1924

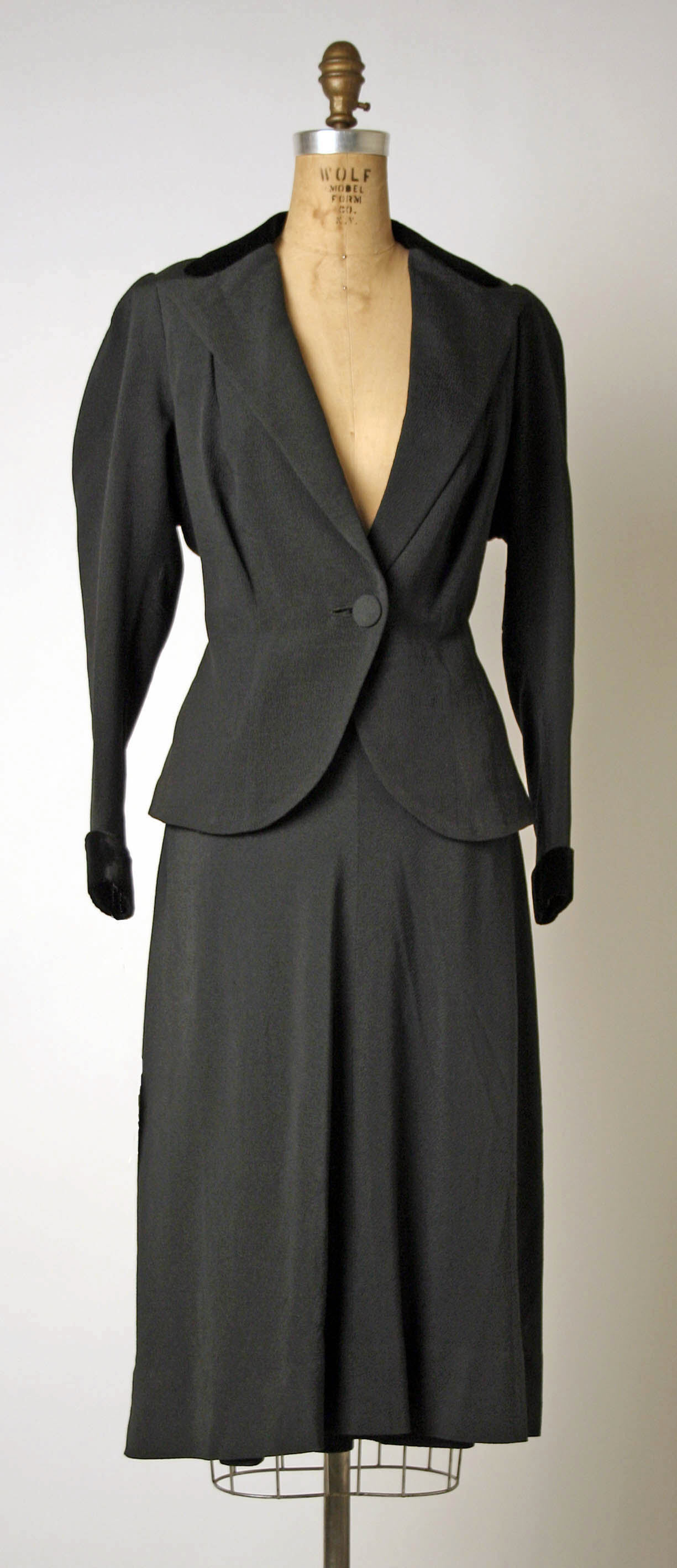
Cocktail suit, 1935
