= Madeleine Vionnet =

French fashion designer (1876–1975)

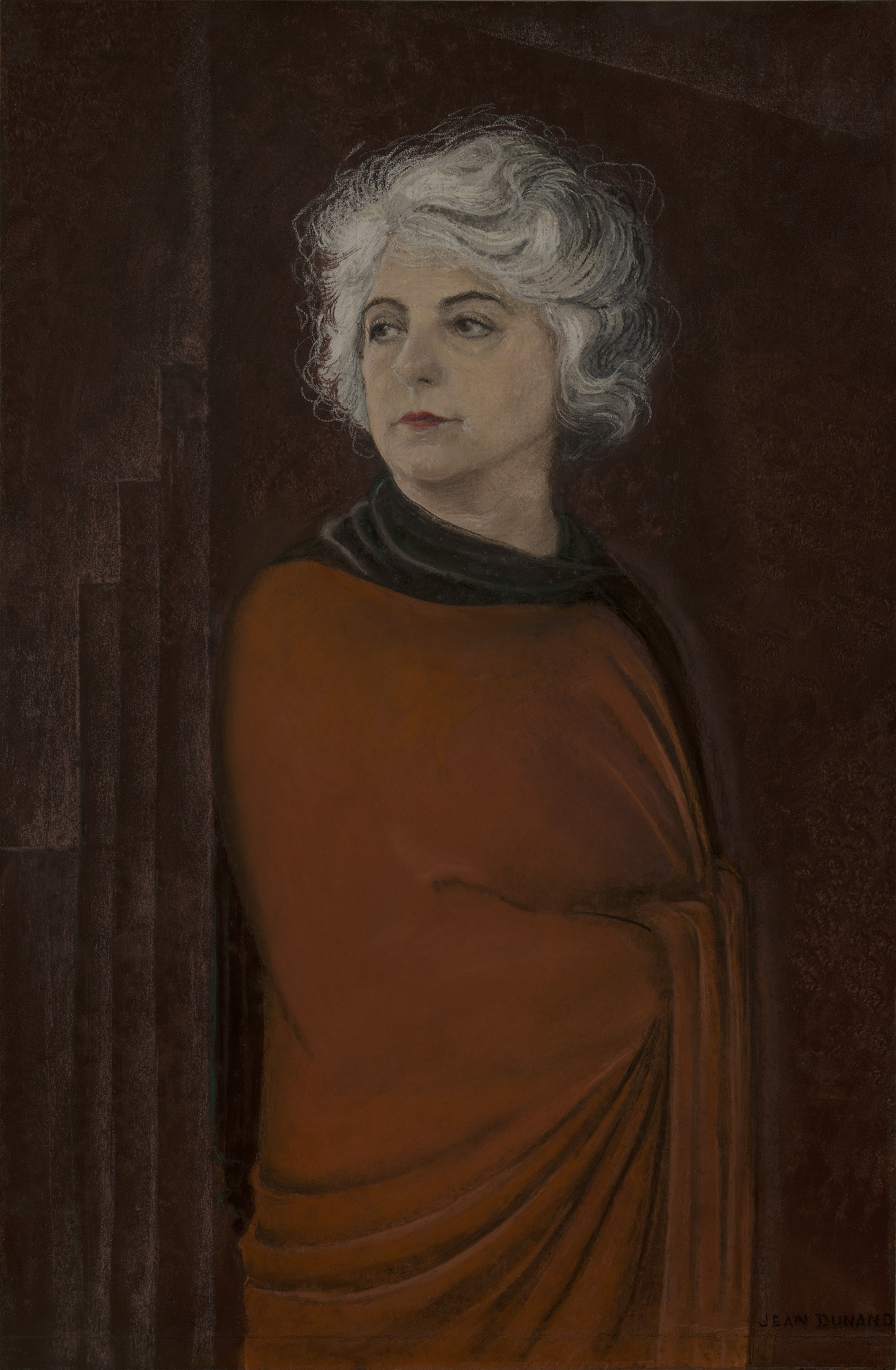
- Portrait of Vionnet by Jean Dunand
- Born: 22 June 1876; Chilleurs-aux-Bois, Loiret, France
- Died: 2 March 1975 (aged 98); Paris, France
- Occupation: Fashion designer
- Label: Vionnet

Madeleine Vionnet (pronounced [madlɛn vjɔnɛ]; June 22, 1876 – March 2, 1975) was a French fashion designer best known for being the "pioneer of the bias cut dress". Vionnet trained in London before returning to France to establish her first fashion house in Paris in 1912. Although it was forced to close in 1914 at the outbreak of the First World War, it re-opened after the war and Vionnet became one of the leading designers of 1920s-30s Paris. Vionnet was forced to close her house again in 1939 at the start of the Second World War and she retired in 1940.

Called "perhaps the greatest geometrician among all French couturiers" in 1925 British Vogue, Vionnet is best known today for her elegant Grecian-style dresses and for popularising the bias cut within the fashion world and is credited with inspiring a number of recent designers.

== Biography ==
Born on 22 June 1876 into a poor family in Chilleurs-aux-Bois, Loiret, Vionnet's parents separated when she was very young and she moved with her father, a toll collector, to Aubervilliers, Seine-Saint-Denis, at the age of five. Having already left school, Vionnet began her apprenticeship at age twelve as a seamstress alongside members of the garde champêtre. After a brief marriage at age 18 – and the loss of her young child – she left her husband and went to London to work as a hospital seamstress. While in London, Vionnet worked as a fitter for Kate Reily.

Vionnet eventually returned to Paris, working for six years in the fashion house Callot Soeurs as a toile maker. After a disagreement with a manager of the house, Vionnet threatened to leave her post. She was convinced to stay by the eldest of the Callot sisters, Marie Callot Gerber, after being offered a promotion that would mean improvising draped designs on a live model with Gerber herself. Vionnet later praised Marie Callot Gerber as "a great lady" and later remarked that "without the example of the Callot Soeurs, I would have continued to make Fords. It is because of them that I have been able to make Rolls-Royces". Her desire for simplicity was ultimately at odds with the characteristic lacy frills of the fashion house.

Vionnet designed for Jacques Doucet between 1907 and 1911. Her use of barefoot models and design of loose robes clashed with the style of the house. In 1912 she founded her own fashion house, "Vionnet", which closed in 1914 owing to the beginning of the First World War. Re-establishing the house in 1923, Vionnet opened new premises on Avenue Montaigne, which became known as the "Temple of Fashion". In 1925, Vionnet's fashion house expanded with premises on Fifth Avenue in New York City. She sold designs purchased off the peg and adapted to the wearer.

Vionnet's bias cut clothes dominated haute couture in the 1930s, setting trends with her sensual gowns worn by such internationally known actresses as Marlene Dietrich, Katharine Hepburn, Joan Crawford and Greta Garbo. Her loyal clients included mainly European aristocrats and wealthy North Americans such as the Baroness Robert de Rothschild, Madame Citroën, Mrs Harrison Williams (Mona von Bismarck) and Lady Davis.

Vionnet's vision of the female form revolutionized modern clothing, and the success of her unique cuts assured her reputation. She fought for copyright laws in fashion. She instituted what, at the time, were considered revolutionary labor practices: paid holidays and maternity leave, day-care, a dining hall, and a resident doctor and dentist for her workers. The onset of World War II forced Vionnet to close her fashion house in 1939, and she retired in 1940. Vionnet created some 12,000 garments over the course of her career.

An intensely private individual, Vionnet avoided public displays and mundane frivolities. Despite her success as a designer, she expressed dislike for the world of fashion, stating: "Insofar as one can talk of a Vionnet school, it comes mostly from my having been an enemy of fashion. There is something superficial and volatile about the seasonal and elusive whims of fashion which offends my sense of beauty". Vionnet was not concerned with being the "designer of the moment", preferring to remain true to her own vision of female beauty.

== Styles and technique ==
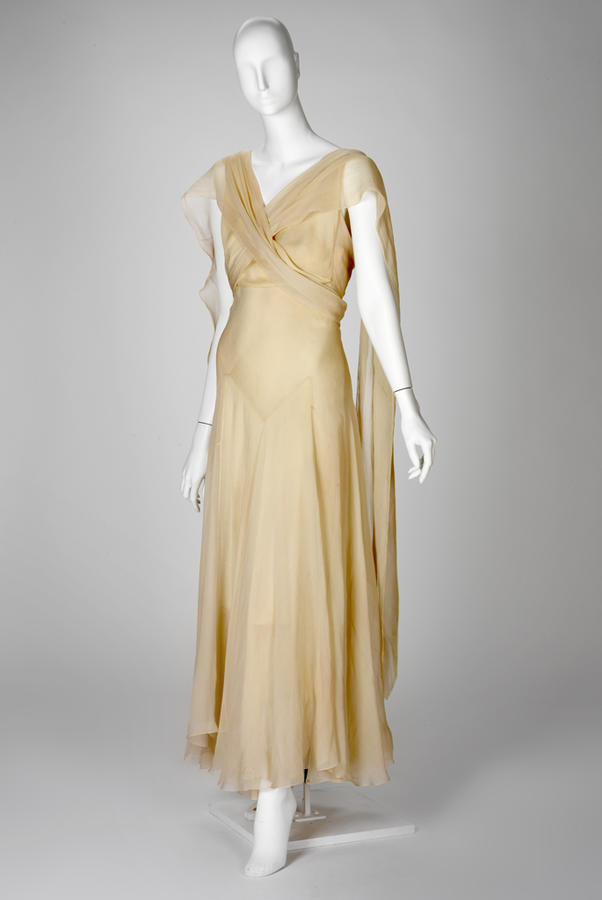
Vionnet evening gown, silk chiffon, c.1932 (RISD Museum)

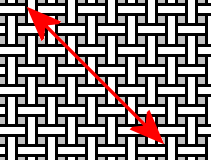
The bias of a textile runs at 45 degrees to both the warp and weft threads.

Alongside Coco Chanel, Vionnet is credited with a move away from stiff, formalised clothing to sleeker, softer clothes. Unlike Chanel, Vionnet had little appetite for self-promotion; her retirement in 1940 marginalised her contribution to the wider movement. Madeleine Vionnet is quoted as saying that "when a woman smiles, her dress must smile with her". Eschewing corsets, padding, stiffening, and anything that distorted the natural curves of a woman's body, she became known for clothes that accentuated the natural female form.

Influenced by the modern dances of Isadora Duncan, Vionnet created designs that showed off a woman's natural shape. Like Duncan, Vionnet was inspired by ancient Greek art, in which garments appear to float freely around the body rather than distort or mold its shape. Her style changed relatively little over her career, although it became a little more fitted in the 1930s.

In the 1920s, Vionnet had created a stir by developing garments utilizing the bias cut, a technique for cutting cloth diagonal to the grain of the fabric, enabling it to cling to the body while stretching and moving with the wearer. While Vionnet herself did not invent the method of cutting fabric on the bias, she was the first to utilize bias cuts for the entirety of a garment. Her work contrasted existing garments that utilized bias cutting for trims and embellishments placed on fabric pieces cut along the straight-of-grain.

Vionnet's use of the bias cut to create a sleek, flattering, body-skimming look revolutionized women's clothing and carried her to the top of the fashion world. Although sometimes credited with its invention, Vionnet claimed to have applied the technique, already used in skirts, trims, and embellishments, to full-body dresses. As an expert couturier, Vionnet knew that textiles cut on the bias could be draped to match the curves of a woman's body and express fluidity of motion. She used the cut to promote the potential for expression and motion, integrating comfort and movement as well as form into her designs.

Vionnet's apparently simple styles involved a lengthy preparation process, including cutting, draping, and pinning fabric designs on miniature dolls. She recreated full garments in chiffon, silk, or Moroccan crepe on life-size models. Vionnet used materials such as crêpe de chine, gabardine, and satin to make her clothes; fabrics that were unusual in women's fashion of the 1920s and 30s.

She ordered fabrics two yards wider than necessary to accommodate draping, creating clothes – particularly dresses – that were luxurious and sensual but also simple and modern. Characteristic Vionnet styles that clung to and moved with the wearer included the handkerchief dress, cowl neck, and halter top.

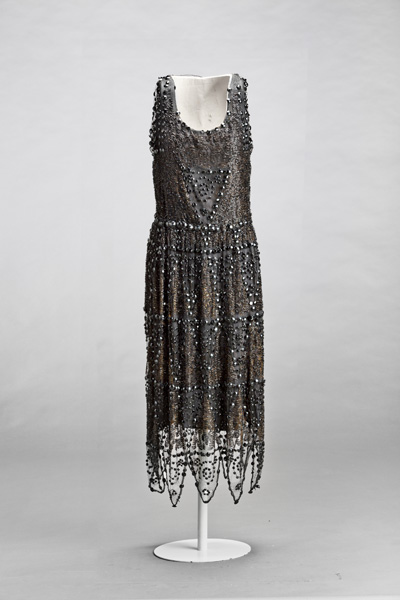
A 1920s Vionnet evening dress, black with beading

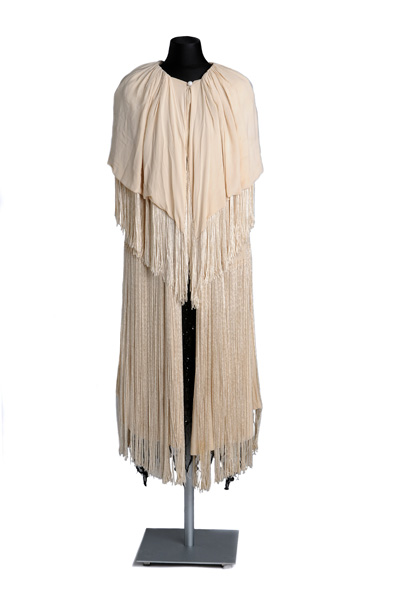
A fringed evening cape, c.1925

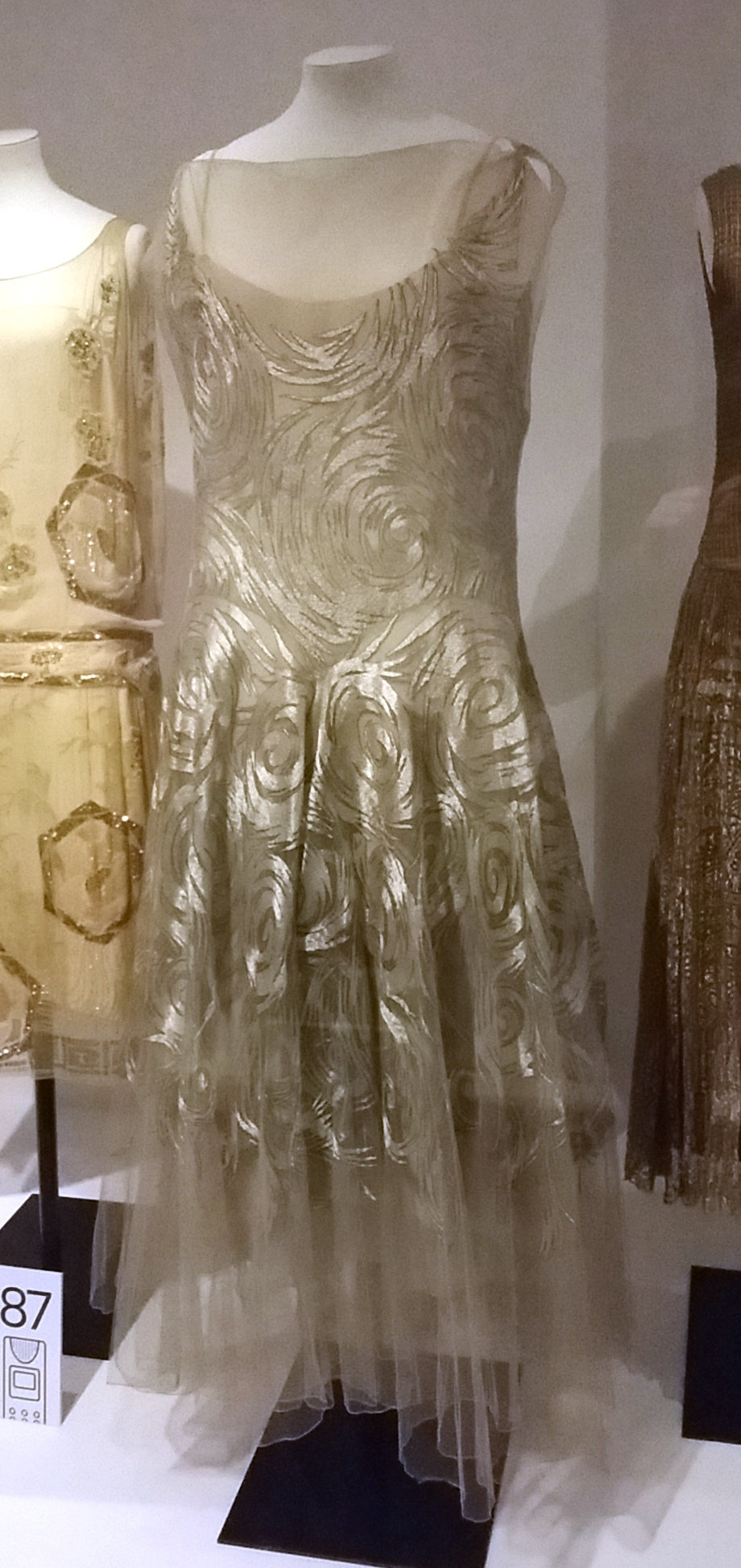
A Vionnet evening gown, embroidered silk net, 1931

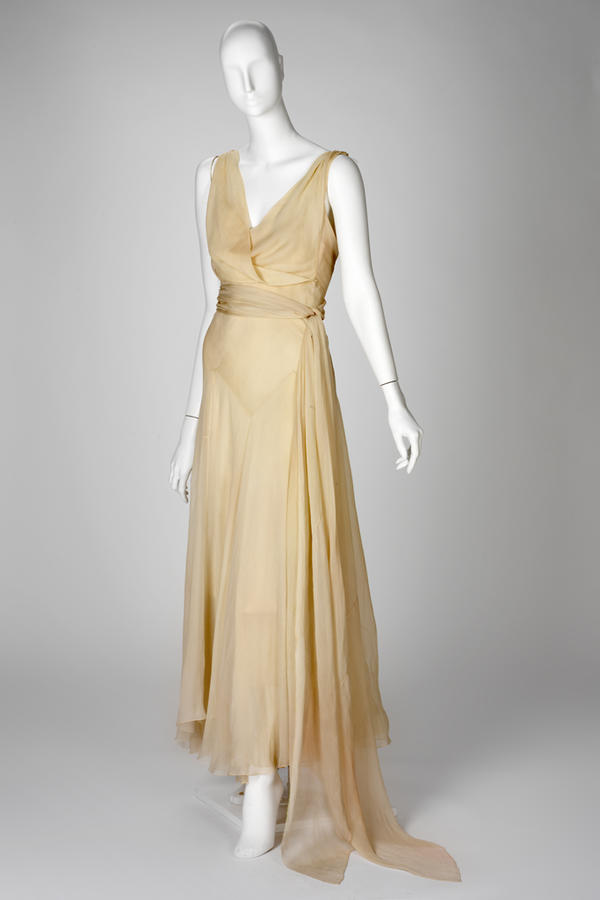
The 1932 gown shown above, draped differently

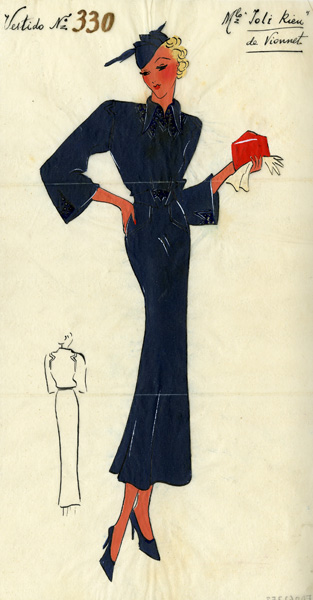
A dress by Vionnet, 1932–34

== Influence on later designers ==
Madeleine Vionnet is considered one of the most influential fashion designers of the 20th century. Both her bias cut and her urbanely sensual approach to couture remain a strong and pervasive influence on contemporary fashion, as evidenced by the collections of such past and present-day designers as Ossie Clark, Halston, John Galliano, Comme des Garçons, Azzedine Alaïa, Issey Miyake and Marchesa. Miyake once remarked that on seeing Vionnet's work for the first time, "the impression was similar to the wonder one feels at the sight of a woman emerging from bathing, draped only in a single piece of beautiful cloth."

Vionnet inspired fashion designers such as Marcelle Chaumont, mother of French author Madeleine Chapsal. She served as godmother to Chapsal.

== Bibliography ==
- Madeleine Vionnet, Pamela Golbin, Patrick Gries, Rizzoli, 2009
- Madeleine Vionnet, Créatrice de Mode, Sophie Dalloz-Ramaux, Editions Cabedita, 2006
- Madeleine Vionnet, 3d Edition, Betty Kirke, Chronicle Books Editions, 2005
- Vionnet – Keizerin van de Mod, Exhibition Catalogue, 1999
- Madeleine Vionnet, 2d Edition, Betty Kirke, Chronicle Books Editions, 1998
- Vionnet, Fashion memoir series, Lydia Kamitsis, Thames & Hudson Editions, 1996
- Vionnet, Collection Mémoire de la Mode, Lydia Kamitsis, Editions Assouline, 1996
- L’Esprit Vionnet, Jéromine Savignon, Publication de l'Association pour l'Université de la Mode, 1994
- Madeleine Vionnet, Les Années d’Innovation, 1919–1939, Exhibition Catalogue, Publication du Musée des Tissus et des Arts décoratifs de Lyon, 1994
- Madeleine Vionnet, 1876-1975 : L’Art de la Couture, Catalogue d’Exposition, Publication du Musée de la Mode de Marseille, 1991
- Madeleine Vionnet, 1st Edition, Betty Kirke, Kyuryudo Art Publishing Editions, 1991
- Madeleine Vionnet, Jacqueline Demornex, Rizzoli Editions, 1991
- Madeleine Vionnet, Jacqueline Demornex, Editions du Regard, 1990
- La Chair de la Robe, Madeleine Chapsal, Editions Fayard, 1989
- Madeleine Vionnet in What Am I Doing Here?, Bruce Chatwin, 1988
- Madeleine Vionnet, ma mère et moi : L'éblouissement de la haute couture, Madeleine Chapsal, Editions Michel Lafon 2010
