= L'Ermitage Beverly Hills =

Luxury hotel in Beverly Hills, California, USA

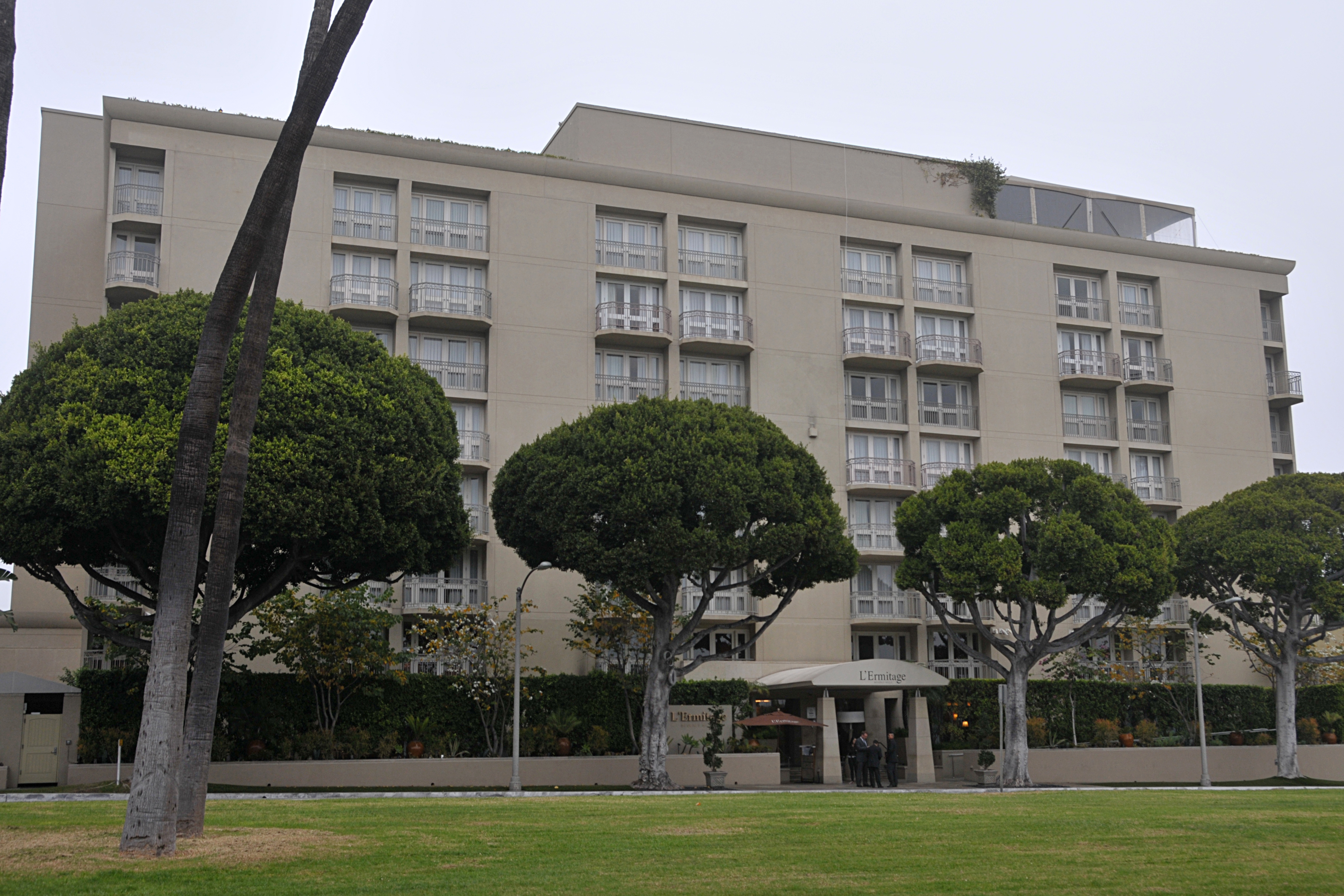
- Front entrance of L'Ermitage Beverly Hills
- Interactive map of the L'Ermitage Beverly Hills area

General information
- Location: Beverly Hills, California, 9291 Burton Way
- Opening: 1975
- Operator: EOS Hospitality

Design and construction
- Awards: Michelin key

Other information
- Number of suites: 116
- Number of restaurants: 1

Website
- https://www.lermitagebeverlyhills.com/

L'Ermitage Beverly Hills is a luxury hotel in Beverly Hills, California. Built in 1975, the property was the first all-inclusive hotel in the United States. Today, the hotel consists of 116 suites.

== History ==
The building housing L'Ermitage was originally constructed in 1975 and was intended to contain condominiums. Developer Severyn Ashkenazy and his brother Arnold Ashkenazy transformed the building into an 111-suite luxury hotel. The name L'Ermitage was chosen in honor of the Hermitage Museum in St. Petersburg. Arnold Ashkenazy was an art collector, and L'Ermitage eventually featured some of the prominent pieces that he owned, including oil paintings by Vincent van Gogh and Pierre-Auguste Renoir.

When L'Ermitage opened in late 1976, it was the first all-suite hotel in the United States. By the 1980s, each suite included a kitchen, dining room, and separate bath and shower rooms. The hotel was situated in a residential neighborhood and sought to distinguish itself through a reputation for exclusivity, fine dining, and guest service. During this period, L'Ermitage was the only Mobil Five-Star, AAA Five-diamond hotel in California.

In 1986, Ashkenazy Enterprises filed for bankruptcy to fend off foreclosure by Beverly Hills Savings & Loan. In 1992, L'Ermitage was taken over by Independence One Bank of California as part of an agreement with the federal government. The hotel was sold for an estimated $12 million in 1993 to New York investment group La Hotel Properties Inc., and then acquired by Paris-based Immobiliere Hoteliers and Los Angeles-based Colony Capital in 1994. The property was then closed for four years for extensive redesigns and renovations totaling $65 million. When L'Ermitage reopened in 1998, the Los Angeles Times noted that the "radical make-over" had "turned the once-stodgy hideaway into a fabulously chic luxury hotel."

In October 2000, L'Ermitage was acquired by Singapore-based Raffles Holdings Ltd. for $68 million. Raffles International then managed the hotel as Raffles L'Ermitage Beverly Hills.

In January 2010, Malaysian financier Jho Low acquired L’Ermitage for $46 million, and it was converted into a Viceroy Hotel later that year. In 2015, the hotel began a $37 million renovation of its suites, public areas, and restaurant that was completed in early 2016. In August 2020, EOS Investors LLC purchased the hotel for $100 million from the U.S. government after it was seized as part of an investigation of Low. In October 2021, L'Ermitage dropped its affiliation with Viceroy and rebranded as L'Ermitage Beverly Hills.

== Features ==
L'Ermitage is an eight-story hotel with 116 rooms, all suites. Rooms average 805 square feet, making them the largest in the Beverly Hills hotel market, and feature marble bathrooms, private balconies, and separate dressing, sleeping, and sitting areas. The entire property was renovated in 2016, including suites and public areas, and decorated with original art selected by Paragone Gallery, giclée prints from Adam Santelli and Jody Morlock, and wire-mesh sculptures from Eric Boyer.

The hotel also features a rooftop pool, luxury spa, bar, and restaurant.

As of 2021, L'Ermitage earned a five-star rating from Forbes Travel Guide, a rating it has maintained since 2000. As of 2020, L'Ermitage earned a Four Diamond rating from AAA.
