= Handkerchief skirt =

Style of skirt with an asymmetric hem

Handkerchief skirts are skirts with asymmetric hems, created from fabric panels that are cut diagonally along the bias grain of the fabric, creating different length panels that are sewn together to create a hem with several corners that hang down as points. The hem resembles a handkerchief that is held by the centre so that its corners hang down as points.

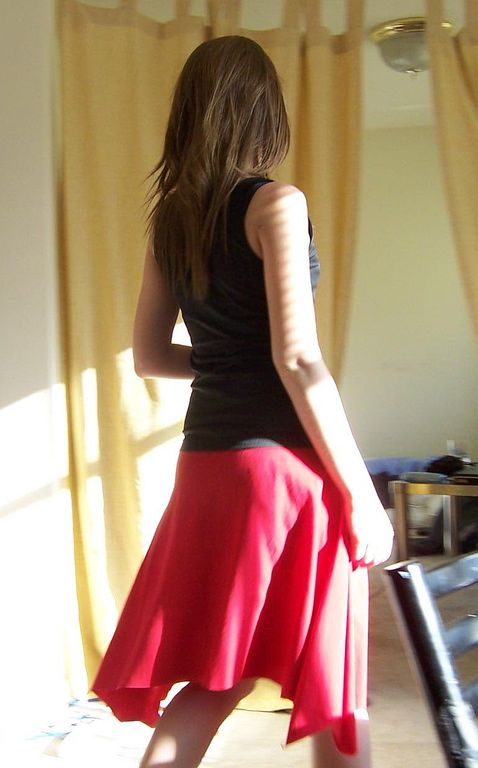
A handkerchief hem skirt.

== History ==
Handkerchief hems have been used in women's tops and skirt hems for centuries in many cultures, to add a flattering drape, especially over the hips. They can be seen in women's clothing in art from Ancient Greece, and appeared in Parisian fashions in the 1910s-1920s, such as the dresses of designer Madeleine Vionnet. Jean Patou followed Vionnet's lead, using the handkerchief hem to transition hemlines away from the shorter Flapper styles he had helped popularize, and towards the longer lengths that were fashionable during the 1930s.

In the simplest design, a square of fabric is cut with an opening in the middle for the waistband. When the skirt is put on, the four corners hang down as points. More panels of material can be used to increase the number of corners, or points, along the hem.

== Revival ==
In the first decade of the 21st century, handkerchief hems returned as a trend in women's clothing. Since the design involves pleats that drape, the effect is achieved with lightweight, flowing fabrics. In 2003, the trend was evident in bohemian styles such as designs by American clothing label Free People. In 2004, handkerchief hems were modelled at Milan fashion shows.

== See also ==
- Skirt
- Hem
- Bias Grain Cut
