= Chilleurs-aux-Bois =

- Commune
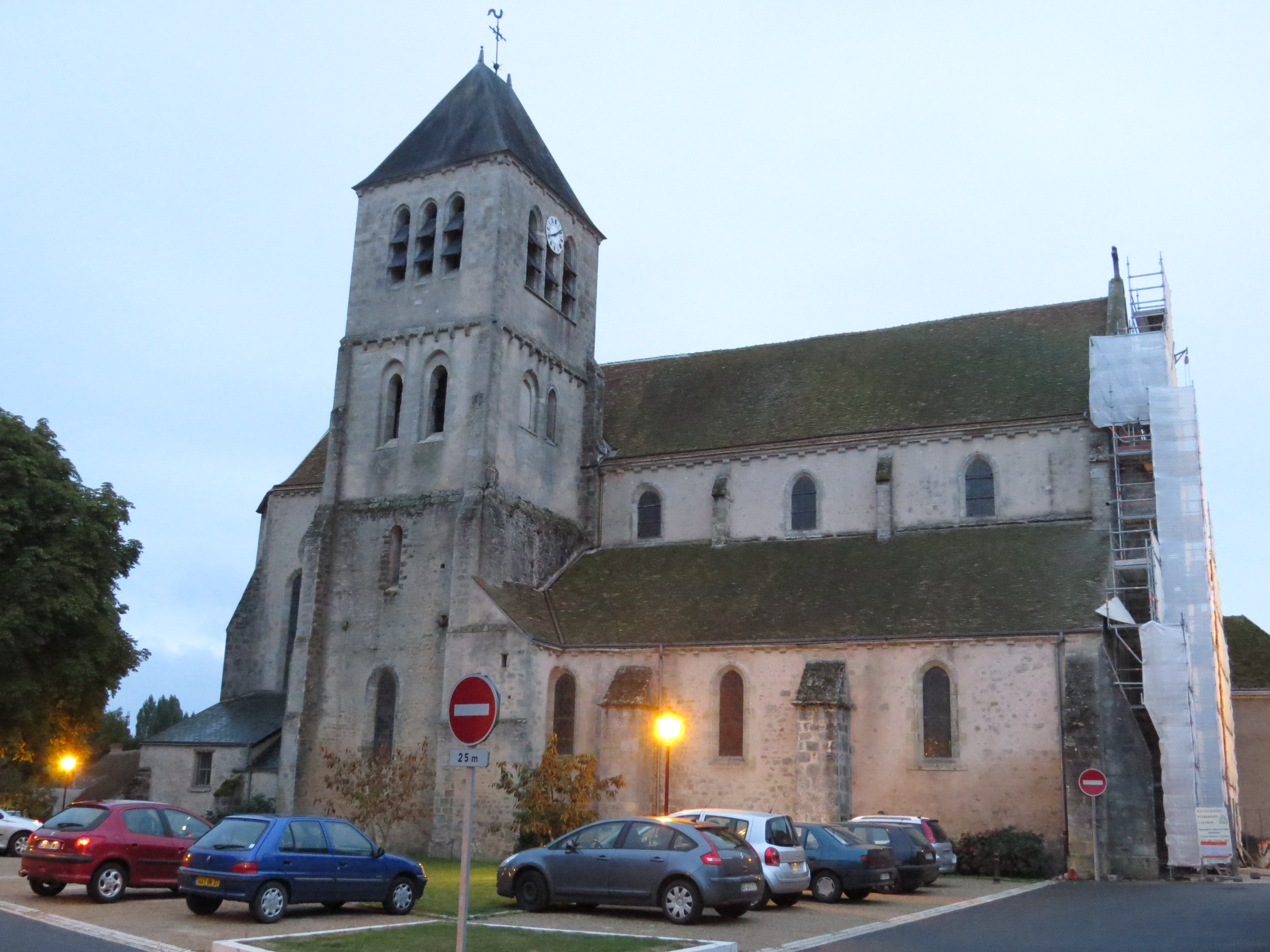
- The church in Chilleurs-aux-Bois

- Coat of arms
- Location of Chilleurs-aux-Bois
- Location within France Location within Centre-Val de Loire
- Coordinates: 48°04′23″N 2°08′09″E
- Country: France
- Region: Centre-Val de Loire
- Department: Loiret
- Arrondissement: Pithiviers
- Canton: Le Malesherbois
- Intercommunality: Pithiverais

Government
  - Mayor (2020–2026): Gérard Legrand
- Area^{1}: 52.22 km^{2} (20.16 sq mi)
- Highest elevation: 150 m (490 ft)
- Lowest elevation: 114 m (374 ft)
- Population (2023): 2,084
  - Density: 39.91/km^{2} (103.4/sq mi)
- Demonym: Chilleurois
- Time zone: UTC+01:00 (CET)
  - Summer (DST): UTC+02:00 (CEST)
- INSEE/Postal code: 45095 /45170
- Website: www.chilleurs-aux-bois.fr
- ^{1} French Land Register data, which excludes lakes, ponds, glaciers > 1 km^{2} (0.386 sq mi or 247 acres) and river estuaries.

Chilleurs-aux-Bois (French pronunciation: [ʃijœʁ o bwa]) is a commune in the Loiret department in north-central France.

== Population ==
Historical population
Year	Pop.	±% p.a.
1968	1,091	—
1975	1,160	+0.88%
1982	1,432	+3.06%
1990	1,471	+0.34%
1999	1,703	+1.64%
2007	1,898	+1.36%
2012	1,850	−0.51%
2017	1,992	+1.49%
2023	2,084	+0.76%
Source: INSEE

== See also ==
- Communes of the Loiret department
