= Aux Etats-Unis =

Parisian trunk maker

Aux États-Unis (literally meaning "To the United States") is a Parisian trunkmaker established in 1845.

== History ==
=== Founding ===
Aux États-Unis went into business in 1845 at 229, rue Saint Honoré, in Paris, two doors down from Goyard.

=== Owners ===
Rousselle and Gérard (1845-1890): Charles Étienne Rousselle is the founder and first owner of the brand. When he died, his widow ran the shop before she assigned the business to L. Gérard.

Deraisme family (1891-1985): In 1891, Eugène Louis Deraisme took over the enterprise; it then successively came under the management of his first wife, Hélène Bordat, his son André Eugène and finally his grandson François who succeeded his father in 1942. The brand eventually disappeared in the 1980s when François Deraisme retired.

Luvanis (since 2011): Luvanis, an investment company specialized in the revival of long-dormant luxury brands and which reintroduced the trunk makers Moynat and Au Départ, acquired the rights into the dormant label in 2011.

=== Partnerships with other Parisian trunk-makers ===
On July 2, 1932, André Deraisme on behalf of Aux États-Unis created a new company, the Coopération Industrielle et Commerciale ("CIC"), in partnership with the directors of the four other trunk-makers of the time (Louis Vuitton, Goyard, Moynat, et Au Départ) in the face of the economic crisis. The five "Maisons" joined forces, notably for the purchase of raw materials and travel items and for patent registrations. The cooperation was to last until 1935.

== Celebrity customers ==
The customers list of Aux États-Unis included many high-profile purchasers.

=== Kings, princes, heads of state and heads of government ===
The British Duchess of Sutherland, the Duchess of Manchester, the Duke of Windsor, and the Duke of Westminster; Prince Kamal el Dine Hussein, the King of Albania, the Maharaja of Jaipur, Maharaja of Mysore and Maharaja of Kapurthala; French President Léon Blum, Prime Minister of Belgium Henry Carton de Wiart, Ohio Governor Myron T. Herrick, New York Governor W. Averell Harriman, the Prince de Bitteto, and the Princesse de Faucigny Lucinge.

=== Writers, artists and actors ===
Lady Mendl, Conan Doyle, Fernand Gravey, Henri Bernstein, and Gilbert Miller.

=== Other celebrity clients ===
British explorer and missionary David Livingstone, the jeweler Jacques Cartier, violinist Jules Boucherit, Diana Vreeland, Pecci Blunt, William Boyce Thompson, American billionaire Moses Taylor, Lady Eve Balfour, John Gardner Coolidge, and the Vanderbilts.
