= Maison Maquet =

French manufacturer of luxury stationery and leather goods

Maquet
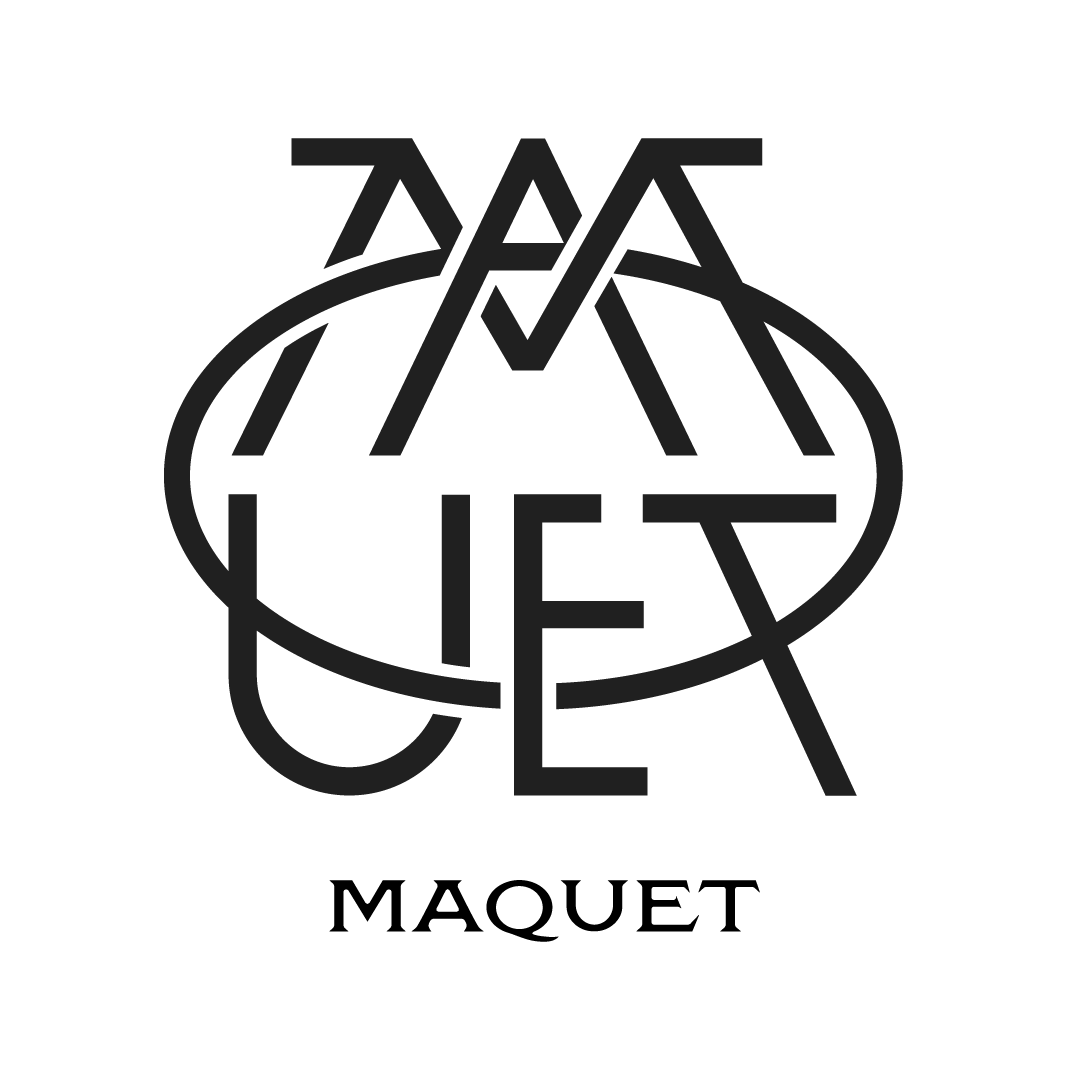
- Industry: Luxury goods
- Founded: 1841
- Founder: Charles Maquet; Hector Maquet
- Headquarters: Paris, France
- Products: Stationery; Leather goods
- Services: Engraving; Printmaking
- Owner: Luvanis
- Website: maquet1841.com

Maquet is a French manufacturer of luxury stationery, leather goods, and art prints, established in Paris, in 1841 by the Maquet brothers, Hector and Charles (brothers of Auguste Maquet). One of the most renowned Parisian luxury houses, Maison Maquet became official purveyor to Empress Eugénie as well as to several royal courts, winning multiple awards and medals at various World's fairs over the course of its history.

== History of Maison Maquet ==
=== Stationery manufacturer since 1841 ===
The Maquet brothers, Hector and Charles, established Maison Maquet in 1841. The eldest Maquet sibling was Auguste Maquet, the novelist, playwright and famous ghost-writer of Alexandre Dumas, for whom he co-wrote several masterpieces such as The Three Musketeers, Queen Margot and The Count of Monte-Cristo.

The Maquet company was created to commercialize the patent for the first machine-made envelopes, the use of which was still little known. This patent, the application for which was filed in 1841 and granted by the French Patent Office on 17 January 1842, described how to manufacture and use the "envelope-card-letter" (enveloppe-carte-lettre, in French), also called "a word in the Mail" (un mot à la Poste). The invention of the envelope was the culminating point of a variety of measures taken since the 17th century to preserve correspondence confidentiality.

In 1846, Hector and Charles Maquet separated their activities: Charles managed the envelopes factory, while Hector ran the boutique shop on Rue de la Paix. In 1864, Hector Maquet registered as a trademark an elegant monogram mixing his initials.

The house was first located at No. 20 (renumbered to No. 24) Rue de la Paix in Paris from 1841 to 1867 and then at No. 10 from 1868, where it remained for about a century. In the early 1970s, the house moved to 45 Rue Pierre Charron, where it kept a boutique shop until 1993. Though it did not have any commercial branch in the 19th century, Maquet eventually opened one in Nice at 16 Masséna Avenue (now Avenue de Verdun) in the early 20th century.

=== Official Purveyor to Empress of France and to celebrity customers ===
Maison Maquet soon became one of the most fashionable personal stationery houses and enjoyed great fame during the French Second Empire. It even obtained the warrant of "official purveyor to Her Majesty the Empress". Empress Eugénie, wife of Napoleon III regularly visited the shop on Rue de la Paix, where she was served by Madame Maquet.

Maquet was also favored by French aristocratic elites, and its clients included the Princess Pauline von Metternich, as well as the Rohan-Chabot and Costa de Beauregard families.

Maison Maquet's products were particularly trendy among foreign royal courts. Maquet notably supplied the Russian court, including the Great Duchess and the Great Duke Konstantin of Russia. In fact, the French daily newspaper Le Figaro reported in 1875 that the "stationary was adorned with the Great Duke's coat of arms, embellished with gold and colors enamel; of unparalleled richness and elegance." The Prince Axel of Denmark was also a faithful client of Maquet.

Later on, with the change of political regime and the onset of the IIIrd Republic, Maquet renewed its clientele and started to supply Republican institutions, including the Presidential Palace known as Palais de l’Elysée, Paris City Hall – the Hôtel de Ville de Paris – and French embassies, as well as financial institutions such as the French National Bank.

Another prestigious customer was the Paris Opera, for which Maquet printed several leaflets and programs.

=== A new era for Maquet ===
In 1908, Maquet changed hands: it became the property of businessman and architect Léon Tissier, who rejuvenated the company through multiple artistic collaborations. Tissier, the son of a travel items manufacturer, also extended Maquet's range of leather goods products. Intent on making his way into the world of printing, he invested in new buildings and printing machinery located rue de Langhouat in the Goutte d’Or neighborhood in Paris, which he eventually yielded to the Établissements Gérault-Fouqueray in 1936.

In 1990, Maison Maquet was acquired by stationery manufacturer and engraver Cassegrain, only to cease its operations in 1994.

Twenty years later, in 2014, Maquet was taken over by Luvanis, a private investment company specializing in reviving sleeping beauty brands, which was notably behind the revival of trunk maker Moynat, and of couture house Paul Poiret.

== Products and services ==
Maison Maquet first specialized in envelopes and luxury stationery, creating custom-made papers with coats of arms and monograms, heraldic paintings on parchment, business cards, wedding invitations, birth announcements, dinner invitations, and dance cards. It then extended its expertise to manufacture luxury leather goods, metalwork, and watches, before branching out to engraving and art printing. Maquet advertized through witty commercial catalogs, theatre programs, and fashion magazines such as the luxury magazine Les Modes.

=== Luxury stationery ===
Maison Maquet originally produced envelopes and various items of fine stationery. Its most famous in-house paper was known as the "empress paper" (papier impératrice), in an elegant shade of pearly grey between white and azure paper.

Maquet also manufactured travel diaries and notebooks. The French author Prosper Mérimée notably wrote the short novel La Chambre Bleue in 1866, dedicated to Empress Eugénie, on a Maquet notebook bound with dark green Morocco leather, discreetly hand-tooled in gold leaf.

At Maquet's, one could find all manners of writing accessories, from inkpots to blotting paper, including notepads, pencils, dip pens, and even paper knives and letter openers made of chiselled silver.

=== Luxury leather goods ===
While still producing envelopes and stationery, Maison Maquet became a luxury leather goods manufacturer. Maison Maquet proposed a wide range of leather goods, including handbags and travel bags, as well as vanity cases, wallets, cardholders and purses. Maquet also sold lawyers’ satchels (serviettes d’avocats) and garnished tourist blotters ("buvards-touriste garnis"). The house developed a whole line of travel items. Inkpots, paper trays, as well as small leather goods, both sturdy and beautiful, were featured in the house's commercial catalogs.

In addition to her personal stationery, Empress Eugénie also purchased her leather goods at Maquet. Maquet's luxury leather goods department catered to a clientele of artists such as the French comedian Jane Sabrier, who matched one of her fashionable outfits with a Maquet bag in reindeer leather in 1909.

In 1938, Maquet was selected to contribute pieces to the trousseau of the two dolls gifted to Princess Elizabeth and Princess Margaret during the official visit of their parents, King George VI and Queen Elizabeth. The gift, intended to reinforce the Entente Cordiale between France and the United Kingdom, displayed French craftsmanship through a 360-piece trousseau in the tradition of Parisian haute couture. Maquet's contributions consisted in leather goods and accessories: two writing cases, one in blue, the other in red, each with its notepaper monogrammed to the dolls’ initials, and a miniature gold pen.

In the 1960s, Audrey Hepburn, Hubert de Givenchy's muse, shopped at Maquet's for her leather goods. She notably possessed five Maquet-branded wallets, all made of black leather.

=== Watches and silverware ===
Maquet added watchmaking to its activities, selling bracelet watches and clocks for phaetons and automobiles.

Applying the same craftsmanship to tobacco articles, the house commercialized lighters, cigar and cigarette boxes. In the early 20th century, it made many lighters from Chinese snuff boxes. Maquet became famous for combining old components into new objects in the orientalist fashion typical of decorative arts at the time.

Furthermore, Maquet boxes, renowned for their refinement, were used to store letters as much as jewels.

=== Photographs ===
Hector Maquet notably shot the portrait of his brother Auguste. Soon he sold works of other photographers in the Paris boutique, including those of Polish photographer Boleslaw Matuszewski. Frames and photo albums were now also on the shelves of Maison Maquet.

=== Engraving and art printing ===
In the early 20th century, Maison Maquet diversified into engraving, and art printing, collaborating with drawing artists, lithographers, poster makers, and engravers including Guy Arnoux, George Barbier, Albert Besnard, Umberto Brunelleschi, Octave Denis Victor Guillonnet, Henri Lebasque, Georges Lepape, Valdo-Barbey, and Adolphe Willette.

Maquet made artistic menus for the Paris Hôtel de Ville (lunch offered to Theodore Roosevelt on 25 April 1910; menu for the opening of the Pavilion of the City of Paris at the International Exhibition of Modern Decorative and Industrial Arts on 14 May 1925), for the Élysée Palace (dinner offered to King Peter I of Serbia on 16 November 1911, illustrated by Octave Denis Victor Guillonet), for French embassies (dinner offered for the reception in honor of King George V by French President Raymond Poincaré at the French Embassy in London, on 25 June 1913, illustrated by George Barbier), for the opening of the French section at the Brussels World Fair in 1910, for the Compagnie Générale Transatlantique (menus for the France Liner), and for the Drouant restaurant in Paris (host of both the Prix Goncourt and the Prix Renaudot committee members’ monthly lunches since 1914 and 1926 respectively).

Maison Maquet printed a poster for the third French National Defense Loan, which was conceived by Albert Besnard in 1917, and that for the Peace Loan, illustrated by Henri Lebasque in 1920. Maquet created posters for Ocean liners, including for the Compagnie de Navigation Sud-Atlantique and for the Compagnie Générale Transatlantique.

Maquet developed exclusive bookplates for the Prince of Hohenlohe (Chancellor of the German Empire from 1894 to 1900), André Kostolany, Raoul Warocqué (who ordered no less than 10,000 ex-libris from Maquet), and Thyra Seillière.

Maquet printed the volume Les Choses de Paul Poiret vues par George Lepape (1911) in which Poiret collaborated with drawing artists, including Paul Iribe and Georges Lepape. Following this publication, the maison began publishing in 1912 an annual luxury magazine, Modes et manières d’aujourd’hui. Lepape was commissioned for the first issue, Martin for the second (1913), and George Barbier for the third (1914).

Maison Maquet designed the commercial catalogs of perfumers Rigaud, L.T. Piver, and Guerlain. Maquet printed many illustrations on advertising fans of Maison Duvelleroy. The maison created heading paper for Paul Poiret and a luxury commercial catalog for Jeanne Paquin (1911). It also conceived ephemerals and various advertising materials for champagne houses such as Moët & Chandon and Charles Heidsieck (1910). Some of this advertising material is now kept in the collections of the Musée des Arts Décoratifs in Paris.

== Patent and awards ==
=== Patent ===
- 1842 – Patent for a machine manufacturing envelopes (application filed on 16 August 1841, and granted on 17 January 1842).
- 1849 – Patent for a machine folding envelopes (application filed on 30 August 1848, and granted on 27 October 1849).
- 1850 – Patent for a machine allowing to simultaneously write and hide what one is writing so as to protect confidentiality (application filed on 9 September 1850, and granted on 2 November 1850).
- 1853 – Patent for improving envelopes (application filed on 19 July 1853, and granted on 24 August 1853).

=== Awards at World’s Fairs ===
- 1855 – Paris World's Fair: Bronze Medal. In December 1855, Le Magasin Pittoresque reviewed the Fair, and focused on the inkpot exhibited by Maquet, which was designed by Riester and sculpted in wood by Gayonnet. This inkpot, described as a "charming luxury piece of furniture," combined medieval inspirations and fabulous creatures, fighting an imaginary struggle. This object reminds of Antoine-Louis Barye’s animal sculptures in the romantic style, especially through its expressiveness and violence.
- 1867 – Paris World's Fair: Silver Medal.
- 1913 – Ghent World's Fair: Great Prize (Class 92, Stationery).
- 1925 – International Exhibition of Decorative and Modern Industrial Arts: exhibited (Class 23, Perfumery).

== See also ==
- Smythson
- Moleskine
