= Armoire Officielle =

Fashion house in Copenhagen, Denmark

Armoire Officielle is a fashion house based out of Copenhagen, Denmark.

It owns the menswear brand Armoire d'homme and the womenswear brand Armoire de femme.

== History ==
The company was founded as a menswear brand in 2012 by Norwegian-born designer Kjetil Aas under the name Armoire d'homme.

In 2015, the company changed its name to Armoire Officielle when launching its first womenswear collection under the name Armoire de femme.

The brand opened a flagship store at Lille Kanikkestræde (No. 3) in Copenhagen in 2016.

== See also ==
- Alain Figaret
- Designers Remix
- Carbrini Sportswear
