= Au Départ =

Parisian trunkmaker

Au Départ, Ltd.
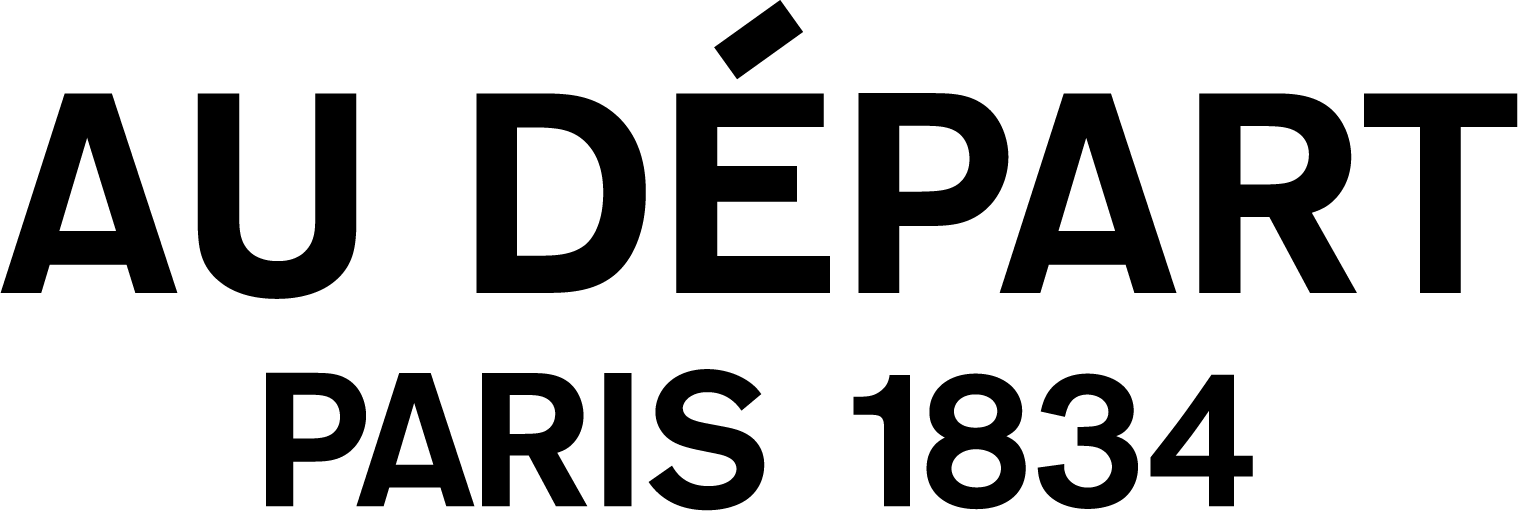
- Founded: 1834; 192 years ago
- Founder: Ernest & Paul Bertin
- Number of locations: 2 (2024)
- Key people: Gianfranco Maccarrone (CEO)
- Products: Trunks, Leather Goods, Handbags
- Website: audepart.com

Au Départ, Ltd. (French pronunciation: [o depaʁ]; which translate as "At the departure") is a Parisian trunkmaker founded in Paris in 1834. Au Départ is considered as one of four greatest French trunk-makers alongside Louis Vuitton, Goyard and Moynat.

== History ==
=== The Origins ===
Au Départ was founded in 1834 upon the advent of railway travel. In 1847, a shop trading under Au Départ selling luggage and travel goods shop opened at 7 boulevard Denain in Paris, opposite the Gare du Nord, a railway station inaugurated the year before on 14 June 1846.

=== The Expansion ===
==== Maison Bertin Frères ====
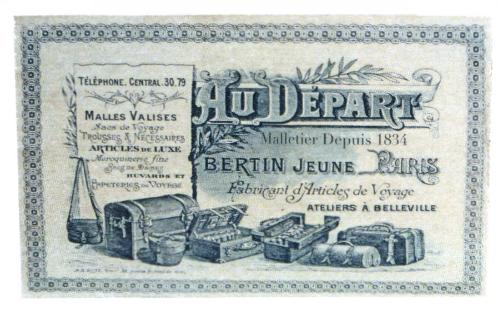
Au Départ sticker "Malletier depuis 1834"

The shop Au Départ located Boulevard de Denain was acquired in 1871 by two brothers, Ernest (born in 1846) and Paul Bertin (born in 1854). Originally from the village of Daulaincourt in Haute-Marne, they had started by selling haberdashery on the Saint-Quentin market. They established the Maison Bertin Frères in 1871.

The boutique on Boulevard de Denain specialised in guns, ammunitions, travel, as well as hunting and fishing goods. Their travel section displayed many different types of trunks (namely postal trunks, rounded trunks, canteen trunks, wicker trunks, flat trunks, wooden trunks covered in a brown canvas, "anglaises" trunks made out of wicker and covered in leather, automobile trunks, etc.), leather suitcases, handbags and stocked vanity cases.

The Bertin Frères business flourished and a second shop, trading under Au Départ, was opened in Paris at 29, Avenue de l'Opéra in 1874. The boutique specialised in travel accessories and leather goods produced in the Belleville, Belleville workshops managed by the Bertin brothers. The brothers invented several related techniques which they were to patent, namely a new production technique for trunks and a new process to render hides and leather products completely waterproof.

==== Maisons Bertin Jeune et Bertin Fils ====
Ernest Bertin, who lived above the Boulevard de Denain boutique, dedicated himself to hunting accessories and established Bertin Fils. Paul Bertin, who for his part lived above the Avenue de l'Opéra boutique, established Bertin Jeune with his sons and continued to specialise in travel goods. The two Maisons Bertin Jeune and Bertin Fils coexisted. Upon Ernest Bertin's death in 1905 the store on boulevard de Denain was sold and the Au Départ shop inside closed circa 1910. On its side, the boutique located on the avenue de l'Opéra continued to prosper.

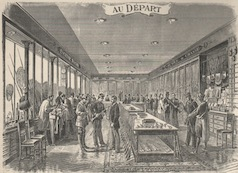
Interior of Au Départ store, 7 boulevard Denain, Paris, 1890s

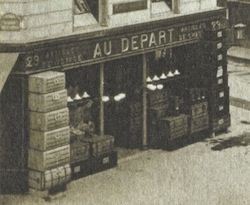
Au Départ store, 29 avenue de l'Opéra, Paris, circa 1900

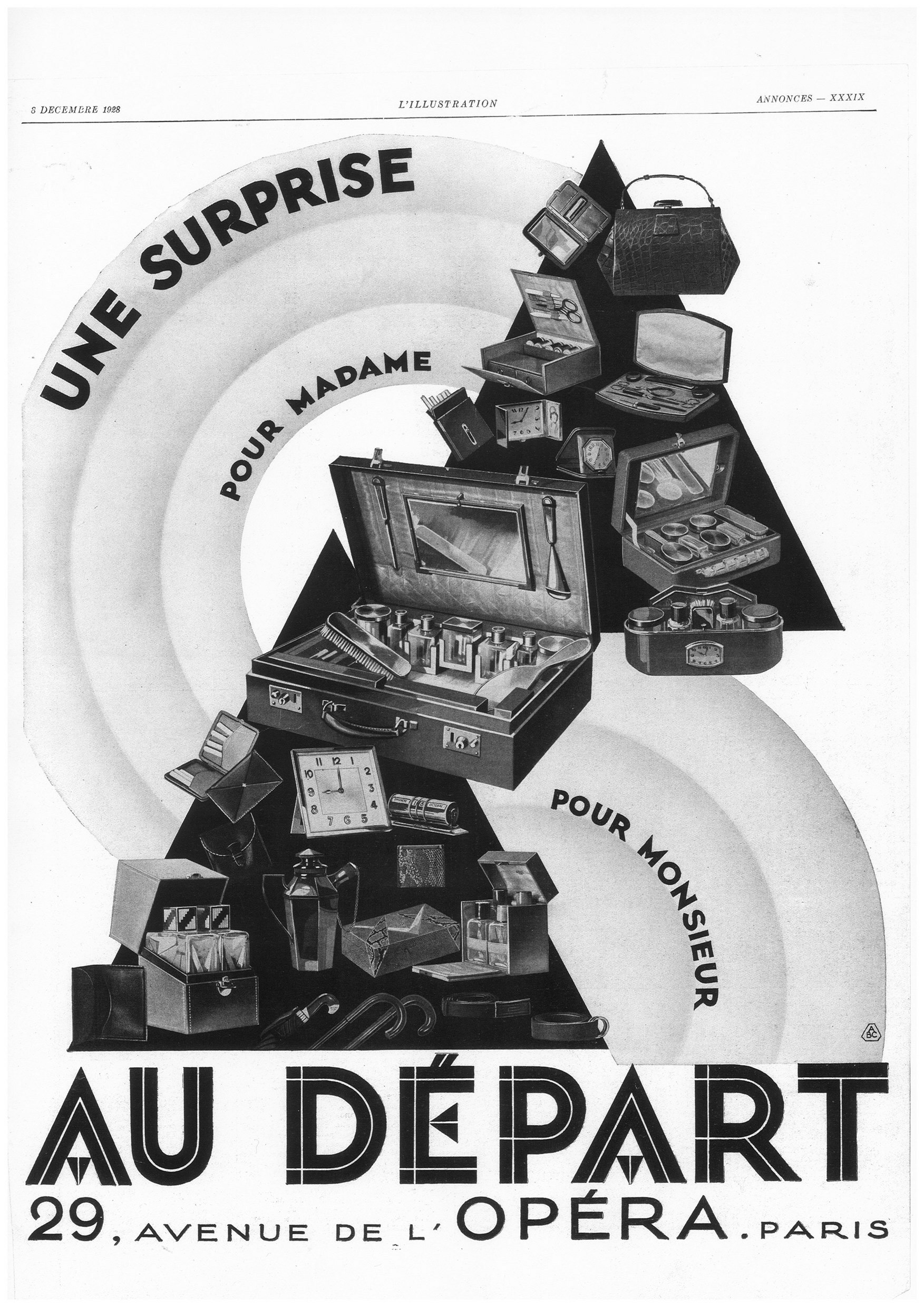
Au Départ advertising published in L'Illustration, December 1928

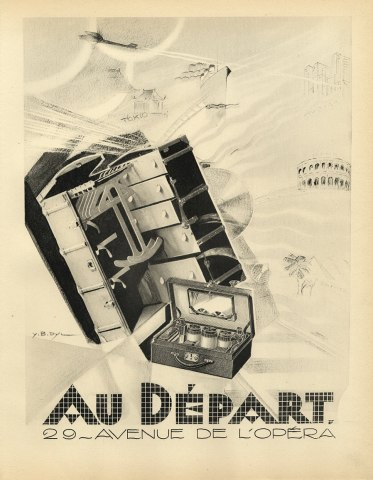
Au Départ advertising published in Pan - L'Annuaire du Luxe, 1928

Au Départ reached its heyday in the 1920s under the leadership of François Bertin, the son of Paul Bertin. In order to differentiate its products, Au Départ is to cover some of its products with a "damier" chequered canvas, offering an alternative to the monogram canvases proposed by the Maisons Louis Vuitton and Goyard. Au Départ is also to actively promote its wares by regularly placing advertisements in the magazine L'Illustration under the theme "A Beautiful Journey Begins".

In 1928, Au Départ was selected with a hundred other luxury brands to feature in the very prestigious Pan-Annuaire du Luxe à Paris (a directory of Parisian luxury) under the direction of the designer Paul Poiret. The advertising featured was designed by French artist Yann-Benard Dyl.

=== Partnerships with great Parisian trunk-makers ===
On 2 July 1932 François Bertin, on behalf of Au Départ, created a new company, the Coopération Industrielle et Commerciale ("CIC"), in partnership with the directors of the four other great trunk-makers of the time (Louis Vuitton, Goyard, Moynat, et Aux Etats-Unis) in the face of the economic crisis. The five "Maisons" joined forces, notably for the purchase of raw materials and travel items and for patent registrations. The cooperation was to last until 1935.

=== The Moynat Au Départ merger ===
After the death of François Bertin in 1964, his son Alain took over the business. To counter the drop in sales, a merger with the historical competitor on the Avenue de l'Opéra, the trunk-maker Moynat, was envisaged. In 1958, the two companies formally merged. The boutique at 29 Avenue de l'Opéra was closed down, and from then on the business trades under the double name "Moynat Au Départ" at Moynat's historical boutique at No.1 Avenue de l'Opéra. Alain Bertin became chairman and CEO of the new company, whilst Maurice Coulembier was named director.

The Moynat-Au Départ shop ceased trading in 1976.

=== The Revival ===
Both Moynat and Au Départ were separately acquired and reintroduced by Luvanis.

Purchased by Groupe Arnault, the holding company of Bernard Arnault, Moynat was relaunched in December 2011 with the opening of a flagship store at 348, rue du Faubourg Saint Honoré in Paris.

Logo used from 2019 to 2023

Au Départ brand relaunched in April 2019 upon the Milan Design Week in Italy, with an installation of old trunks from the Au Départ historical archive and the introduction of new trunks. Au Départ released a new collection of trunks and bags featuring the signature monogram motif upon a launch on Paris' historic rue Saint Honoré in 2019 available within a selection of high-end retailers.

In 2024 Au Départ opened its first new boutique at 20 Rue du Faubourg Saint-Honoré. It also opened a shop-within-a-shop in Seoul, South Korea.

== Sources ==
- Bertin Frères, Au Départ, Chasse 1885–1886, catalog, 1885
- Bertin Jeune, Au Départ, catalog, 1905
- Loyer, François (dir.), Autour de l'Opéra. Naissance de la ville moderne, Action artistique de la Ville de Paris, 1995
- Maison Bertin Fils, Au Départ, catalog, 1895
- Moynat-Au Départ, catalog, 1965
- Rolland, Jean-Philippe, Kieffer-Rolland, Marie, Restauration des malles de voyage, Eyrolles, 2008
- Tzenkoff, Pierre, Goyard, Malletier, Maison fondée en 1792, édition Devambez, 2010, p. 44 dedicated to Maison Au Départ

== See also ==
- Aux Etats-Unis
- Louis Vuitton
- Goyard
- Moynat
