= Finnigans =

Luxury luggage manufacturer

Coordinates: 51.5107°N 0.1427°W

- Industry: Luxury goods
- Founded: 1830
- Founder: Brian Finnigan
- Defunct: 1988
- Headquarters: New Bond Street
- Products: luggage, trunks, and accessories
- Owner: Luvanis
- Website: finnigans.com

The House of Finnigans was a British luxury luggage and trunk maker established in 1830, originally in Manchester and later in New Bond Street in London. The House of Finnigans manufactured and produced a wide range of luxury products, including trunks, bags, fashion, jewellery, timepieces, and silverware.

== History ==
=== Early life of Brian Finnigan ===
The House of Finnigans was founded by Brian Finnigan, an Irishman descended from Brian Boru, the king of Ireland in the high Middle Ages. He was the son of a seafarer, who spent summer months sailing off the coast of Newfoundland, where he hunted whales and seal in Arctic waters.

In 1805, Brian Finnigan apprenticed to his father's friend and former sailing partner, Reuben Farrel. Farrel made leather goods in Liverpool, especially bags and trunks. This durable and weatherproof luggage was particularly adapted to the long and tedious journeys of that time. Both Reuben Farrel and Brian Finnigan moved to Manchester as it developed into a prosperous city with the boom of the cotton industry.

=== Mancunian origins ===
In 1830, Brian Finnigan established a house on his own, the House of Finnigans. He opened a workshop in Newton Street Mill, and a Finnigans shop in Market Street. Finnigans soon became famous for its high-quality leather goods and saddlery.

Particularly timely, the opening of the shop coincided with the beginning of the Liverpool and Manchester Railway and Robert Stephenson's Rocket, the world's first steam passenger railway, which increased demand for travel goods. Finnigans devised a special range of items for railway travel like the "Lady Train Case," with a jewelry tray and enough room for a woman's travelling wardrobe. From then on, the house adapted its travel goods to new means of transportation from the railway to the automobile, and later air travel.

As picnicking became a fashionable outdoor activity, Finnigans elaborated the "Wicker Picnic Basket," which was popular not only among English travelers, but also Indian Rajahs who strapped them on the backs of elephants.

=== Expansion and advertising ===
In 1851, Finnigans gained international recognition when the house won a gold medal for craftsmanship at Prince Albert’s Great Exhibition at the Crystal Palace, thereby spreading Finnigans’ reputation even wider.

By 1855, Finnigans had branched out, and now advertised as a trunk and portmanteau manufacturer. Its range of items constantly increased to include new items that were adapted to the new means of transportation.

One such item was the "Treble Folding Portmanteau" so constructed that the compartments were accessible at once and entirely distinct from each other, "rendering it unnecessary for luggage being disturbed or moved in passing through the customs."

The house's growth led to the opening of new premises at Piccadilly and Oxford Street, in addition to its original location at Market Street, Manchester.

William Finnigan, who embodied the second generation of the family business, built on his father's business and was behind the company's diversification and commercial success. He took over when Brian Finnigan died in 1868.

=== Expansion ===
In 1879, William Finnigan opened a Finnigans shop at 18 New Bond Street in London. Soon, American millionaires such as the Rockefellers, the Vanderbilts and the Fords joined the house's customer base. Opposite Finnigans on Bond Street was Asprey: the two houses enjoyed a friendly rivalry that led to fruitful commercial developments. Still specializing in leather and saddlery, Finnigans also sold clocks, watches, and silverware.

Their London other addresses were Clifford Street, Coach & Horses Yard, Old Burlington Street while their London works were at 6–10 Lexington Street, W1.

Finnigans also had stores in Liverpool at 32 Bold Street and 37–41 Dale Street.

By the end of the century, the company outgrew its Manchester premises and moved to a more spacious building in Deansgate. With the department store Kendals at one end and Finnigans at the other, Deansgate became Manchester's main shopping street. The Deansgate store was later enlarged to encompass Finnigan's galleries, including a sports department, fashion and menswear, as well as beauty products.

=== Entering modernity ===
As the use of both personal and professional staff declined, the need for more lightweight luggage arose. Additionally, the use of motor car travel and the individual liberalization of travel were partly responsible for a new generation of luggage.

Portability became Finnigans’ priority. In 1909, Finnigans advertised cases that were strong and resistant yet "so light you can easily carry one yourself and thus retain your jewellery and valuables under your own control." In 1912, Finnigans also commercialized a "Lady’s Motor Hand Bag," both lightweight and fitted.

Finnigans adapted to modern forms of travel and developed special lines of luggage for overseas travel, especially on ocean liners such as the Titanic, Normandie, Queen Mary, and Canberra.

While practical, Finnigans’ travel items were also high quality. The house's lightweight dressing cases in colourful, polished Morocco were successful. Among the luxury items was a dressing case offered as a marriage or birthday present, in crocodile skin with solid gold mountings and tortoiseshell handles. Crocodile briefcases by Finnigans have become valued collectables.

In the 1930s, Finnigans launched a sports clothing line to fit the new lifestyle of the elite, and especially the vogue of sunbathing and swimming in seaside resorts. A two-piece bathing suit in bright yellow is preserved at the Victoria & Albert Museum in London.

Air travel brought weight restrictions and begat a reduction in the weight, size, and structure of luggage to which Finnigans contributed. New materials like vulcanized fiber replaced the heavier structured cases of leather and wood.

=== WW2 and closure ===
In 1938, the fourth generation of the family took over and Brian Finnigan, named after his ancestor, became the managing director. During the Second World War, the house of Finnigans contributed to the war effort as its factory produced much needed webbing equipment.

Brian Finnigan expanded the reach of the family business and built up an export market to New York City, Canada, and the Caribbean. After the war, Peter Finnigan joined his cousin Brian in the company and travelled to Macy's in New York to learn from modern American department stores and strengthen Finnigans’ export activities.

The two men studied with interest the moving of city stores to suburban locations and the advent of the shopping mall. When the lease of the Deansgate store in Manchester expired in the 1950s, they pioneered this new retailing trend and moved Finnigans to Wilmslow, twelve miles from Manchester's city centre. Many other shops followed, making Wilmslow a thriving shopping center.

While in Wilmslow, Finnigans retained its luxury positioning, and notably sold tailor-made suits in high quality tweed. The house also produced high fashion handbags in crocodile lined with suede that were of "lasting luxury.”

In 1968, Finnigans closed its New Bond Street store in London. The company remained a family-run business until it shut down its last store in 1988.

=== Today ===
The house of Finnigans has since changed hands and is now owned by the Luvanis company, which specializes in reviving long-dormant brands, such as Moynat and Belber.

== See also ==
- Asprey
