= Mainbocher =

Fashion label (1890–1976)

- Industry: Luxury goods
- Founded: 1929; 97 years ago
- Founder: Main Rousseau Bocher (1890–1976)
- Headquarters: New York City, United States
- Products: Luxury goods
- Owner: Luvanis
- Website: www.mainbocher.com

Mainbocher is a fashion label founded by the American couturier Main Rousseau Bocher (October 24, 1890 – December 27, 1976), also known as Mainbocher (pronounced /meɪnboʊʃeɪ/). Established in 1929, the house of Mainbocher successfully operated in Paris (1929–1939), and then in New York (1940–1971).

== French years (1929–1939) ==
In November 1929, Main Rousseau Bocher merged his own name, in honor of his favorite couturieres, Augustabernard and Louiseboulanger, and established his own fashion house, incorporated as "Mainbocher Couture" at 12 Avenue George-V in Paris. Mainbocher progressively gained recognition for his high quality couture garments. The strapless dress and jeweled cashmere sweaters are his creations.

His style gave Mainbocher an famous clientele, which included fashion editors Carmel Snow, Bettina Ballard, Diana Vreeland; aristocrats Princess Karam of Kapurthala, Elsie de Wolfe, Lady Castlerosse, the Vicomtesse de Noailles, Baroness Eugène de Rothschild; pianist Dame Myra Hess; socialites Millicent Rogers, Daisy Fellowes, Mrs. Cole Porter, Syrie Maugham, and Hollywood stars Mary Pickford, Constance Bennett, Kay Francis, Claudette Colbert, Irene Dunne, Loretta Young, Miriam Hopkins, and Helen Hayes.

His most famous patron was Wallis Simpson, after whom he even named a color, "Wallis Blue". In 1937, he also designed her wedding dress and trousseau for her marriage to the Duke of Windsor, after he abdicated the British throne. Described in 1950 as "one of the most photographed and most copied dresses of modern times", the bridal dress is today part of the Metropolitan Museum's Costume Institute collection. Hamish Bowles later said: "I think [Mainbocher's clothes] are so subtle, the detailing is so extraordinary, and they are so unbelievably evocative of ... absolute subtle luxury. You can really see why a client like Wallis Windsor would have been drawn to his clothes, and why she became so emblematic of his work."

Mainbocher's last Paris collections created a storm of controversy. Anticipating Christian Dior's "New Look" by eight years, the "wasp waist", a nipped-in waist, radically altered the silhouette of the thirties. Dior himself confessed: "Mainbocher is really in advance of us all, because he does it in America." The corset that shaped Mainbocher's last Parisian collection was immortalized in 1939 by one of Horst P. Horst's most famous photographs, known as the "Mainbocher Corset." Mainbocher's corseted waist, defined bosom, and back draping was an abrupt shift in silhouette and introduced the Victorian motifs that were to pervade the forties. In his book Decades: A Century of Fashion, in which he named Mainbocher "the designer of the 30's," Cameron Silver further noted that "Mainbocher's designs oozed exclusivity, good breeding, and rarefied taste."

== American years (1940–1971) ==
The onset of Second World War forced Mainbocher to leave France. In 1940, he relocated his business to New York on 57th Street next to Tiffany's and established "Mainbocher Inc." He recreated his Paris salons exactly as they were and stayed to true to haute couture traditions.

The corset controversy proved to be a timely marketing opportunity; the house of Mainbocher teamed up with the Warner Brothers Corset Company and streamlined the design for mass production. He showed his first New York collection on October 30, 1940, and soon established himself as one of the leading American fashion designers. He solved fabric rationing issues by designing short evening gowns and "cocktail aprons" that could transform any dress into a formal evening dress.

During the war, Mainbocher designed a series of uniforms for both military and civilian organizations, applying his principles of functionality and utility while retaining the style of his namesake label. These uniforms also allowed him to reclaim his American identity in a patriotic context. In 1942, he conceived the uniforms for the women-only division of the American Navy, called WAVES. He then updated the uniforms of the American Red Cross, and in 1948, he unified the uniforms of Girl Scouts in the same shade of green. In 1950, he designed a one of a kind evening dress uniform for Colonel Katherine Amelia Towle, who was then Director of Women Marines (USMCR). This unique uniform is now on display at the armory of the Newport Artillery Company in Newport, Rhode Island.

In New York, Mainbocher continued to dress generations of women like debutante Brenda Frazier, Doris Duke, Adele Astaire, Elizabeth Parke Firestone, Gloria Vanderbilt, Lila Wallace, Bunny Mellon, Babe Paley, Princess Maria Cristina de Bourbon, Kathryn Miller, and C. Z. Guest. In 1947, eight of the New York Dress Institute's Ten Best-Dressed Women in the World were Mainbocher clients.

After he achieved fame for dressing some of the world's most famous women, Mainbocher was commissioned to design the costumes for Leonora Corbett in the comic play Blithe Spirit (1941); Mary Martin in the Broadway musicals One Touch of Venus (1943) and The Sound of Music (1959); Tallulah Bankhead in the Broadway production Private Lives (1948); Ethel Merman in the musical Call Me Madam (1950); Rosalind Russell in the musical Wonderful Town (1953); Lynn Fontanne in The Great Sebastians (1956); Katharine Cornell in The Prescott Papers; Irene Worth in the play Tiny Alice (1964); and Lauren Bacall in the musical Applause (1970).

In 1961, the Mainbocher business moved to the K.L.M. Building on Fifth Avenue and continued until 1971 when Mainbocher, at the age of 81, closed the doors of his house. He divided his last years between Paris and Munich until his death in 1976.

== Legacy ==
In 2002, Mainbocher was honored with a bronze plaque on New York City's Fashion Walk of Fame in the legendary Garment District.

Mainbocher inspired many of the most high-profile fashion designers, including Christian Lacroix, who praised his garments.

Mainbocher's fashion designs have been displayed in many exhibitions over the years. In 2010, the Museum of the City of New York created a virtual exhibition on Worth & Mainbocher, which was the first to emphasize Mainbocher's work.

The first retrospective dedicated to Mainbocher, entitled Making Mainbocher, took place at the Chicago History Museum from October 2016 to August 2017. This exhibition was partly sponsored by Luvanis, which is the current owner of the brand.

== See also ==
- Haute couture
- Charles James
