= Mario Moya =

American fashion designer

Mario Moya is a New York-based fashion designer.

== Early life and education ==
Mario Moya was born in Mexico and spent his childhood years in Chicago, Moya became interested in fashion at a very young age, gaining inspiration from film noir and designers like Christian Dior and Charles James. He began sewing his own designs at age thirteen.

== Career ==
He moved to New York City in his twenties to train under various designers and quickly established a reputation as a talented designer. In 1995, Thierry Mugler asked Moya to assist in the making of clothing for Mugler's private clientele in New York. Moya continued his work with Mugler in Paris, where he worked on the Spring 1997 collection. Moya then took a place on the design team of the French couture house of Jacques Fath. Moya moved back to New York to work on Marc Jacobs' collection, later becoming the head Pattern Maker at Zac Posen.

Moya is now based in New York. His clients include Daphne Guinness. He showed his debut collection at New York Fashion Week in February 2009. He has exhibited a collection again in 2010.
