= Luvanis =

Private investment company

Luvanis S.A.
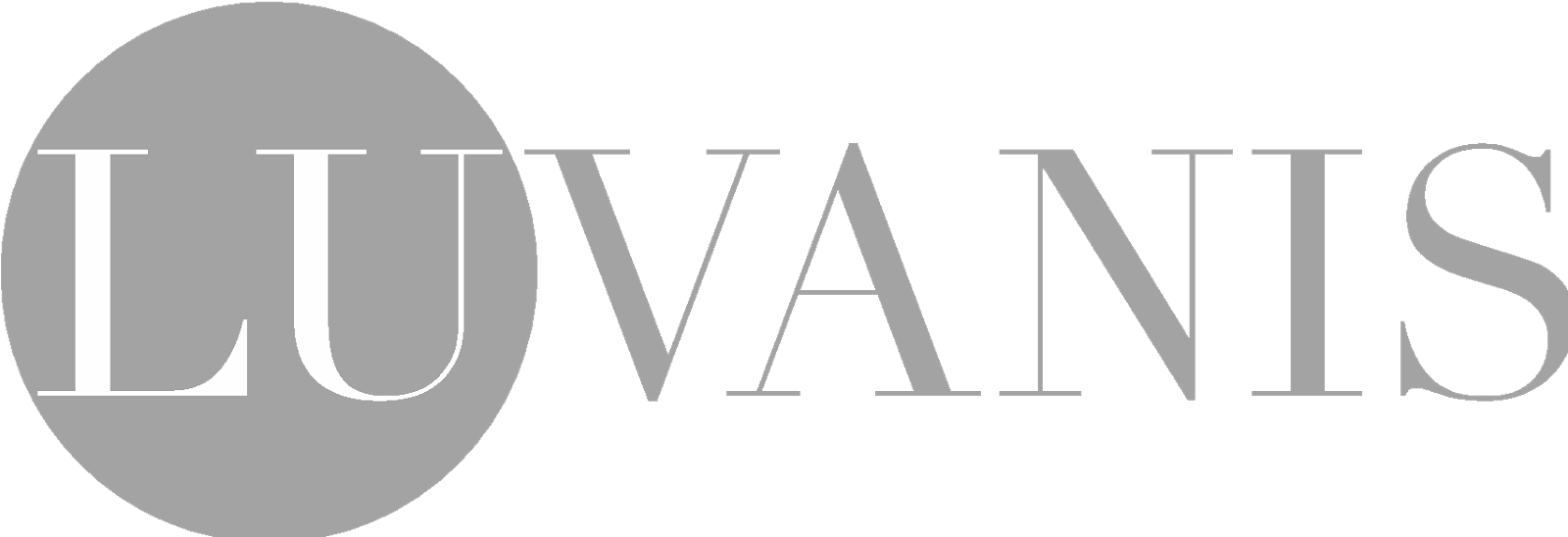
- Type: Private
- Industry: Luxury goods
- Founded: February 11, 2009; 17 years ago
- Headquarters: Luxembourg City, Luxembourg
- Key people: Arnaud de Lummen (Managing director); Guy de Lummen (Board member); Carlo Schneider (Board member); Pierre Mallevays (Board member)
- Brands: Charles James; Finnigans; Mainbocher; Maquet; Rose Bertin
- Website: Luvanis.com

Luvanis S.A. is a private investment company headquartered in Luxembourg and specialized in the incubation and revival of long-dormant luxury brands, also coined as “sleeping beauties”.

== History ==
In 2007, Guy de Lummen and his son Arnaud de Lummen reintroduced the first Vionnet clothing line since 1939, with Sophia Kokosalaki as creative director and Barneys New York as exclusive distributor. After the initial reboot, Arnaud and Guy de Lummen sold Vionnet to Italian entrepreneurs Matteo Marzotto, former CEO of Valentino, and Gianni Castiglioni, CEO and owner of Marni.

After this successful experience, the father-and-son duo founded Luvanis in 2009. In 2009, Luvanis acquired rights over the luxury trunk maker Moynat and drove Bernard Arnault (through his holdings Groupe Arnault) to buy Moynat. Moynat reopened in Paris in December 2011. Luvanis also relaunched the French trunk maker Au Départ and the American leather goods company Belber. Belber was then sold to the former owners of Alain Figaret and Delvaux. Au Départ was retributed to Asian investors and relaunched on rue Saint Honoré in 2019.

In the wake of a landmark exhibition at the Metropolitan Museum of Art dedicated to the American fashion designer Charles James in 2014, Luvanis joined forces and trademarks rights with the designer’s heirs in June 2016, paving the way for the revival of the couture house. In September 2018, Luvanis revealed a new visual identity for Charles James, and put up for sale all the brands rights, which had been consolidated in the previous years.

In October 2014, Luvanis put up for sale the Paul Poiret house and its archives and sold it to the South Korean luxury group Shinsegae International in August 2015. The sale was officially confirmed in January 2018 and the brand relaunched after a 90-year hiatus.

Luvanis was the lead corporate sponsor of an exhibition on Mainbocher held at the Chicago History Museum between October 2016 and August 2017, which garnered more than 100,000 visitors. Luvanis announced plans to revive the couture house shortly after.

== Activities ==
Luvanis is a company focused on identifying and acquiring the rights to forgotten brand gems in order to reposition them and find partners or investors to fund their relaunch. The business model attempts to strike a balance between reasserting the brands’ heritage, and updating it for the present. Over the years, Luvanis has constituted a portfolio of long-dormant ‘sleeping beauty’ brands composed of former luxury houses in fashion, shoes, leather goods, jewelry, perfume, and champagne, which had enjoyed decades of success before closing doors. Brands selected will typically have received great recognition both in their prime (prizes at World's fairs, imperial or royal warrants) and later on, with for instance dedicated exhibitions (such as Paul Poiret or Charles James honored at the Metropolitan Museum of Art), or in some cases by becoming the object of a strong cult following.

== Brands ==
A list of brands that are currently or formerly part of Luvanis portfolio:

=== Dormant ===
Brand	Description	Creation	Became Dormant	Status
Rose Bertin	French fashion house	1774	early 1800s	To be relaunched as a fragrance line
Finnigans	British trunk-maker	1830	1988	
Maquet	French leather and stationery maker	1841	1993	
Callot Soeurs	French couture house	1895	1937	
Charles James	British-American couture house	1928	1958	
Mainbocher	French-American couture house	1929	1971	
Pierre Sterlé	French jewellery house	1934	1976	

=== Revived ===
Brand	Description	Creation	Became Dormant	Status
Doucet	French fashion house	1816	1929	Revived in 2024 as a furniture line
Vever	French jeweler	1821	1982	Revived in 2021 by Camille and Damien Vever
Au Départ	French trunk maker	1834	1976	Revived in 2019 by new owner Adrian Cheng
Moynat	French trunk maker	1849	1976	Revived in 2011 by new owner Bernard Arnault
Belber	American trunk maker	1891	1970	Revived in 2016 by new owners
Paul Poiret	French couture house	1903	1929	Revived in 2018 by new owner Shinsegae International
Vionnet	French couture house	1912	1939	Revived in 2007, now owned by ChimHaeres
Maggy Rouff	French fashion house	1929	1984	Revived in 2026
Herbert Levine	American shoe maker	1948	1975	Revived in 2025
