= Belmal =

Luggage museum in Belgium

BelMal is a Belgian label-house known for, on the one hand, its private museum collection of antique and ancient travel equipment; and on the other hand the conservation and restoration workshop, and atelier for the design and manufacture of brand-new trunks. Since 2024 BelMal is located in Mons. In prior times it was situated successively at Ixelles, Manhay, and a branch at Durbuy.

The Malles de Voyage museum collection comprises antique travelling trunks and related baggage and travel equipment from around the globe. It is the world's most important collection of Belgian trunk-makers.

The BelMal Archives include registries of names and brands of trunk makers (malletier) that were active in Europe and around the globe. There is also a separate registry of Belgian trunk makers and manufacturers of travel objects.

In the restoration workshop, led by a person of authority in the field of travel trunks restoration and history, travel trunks are restored for the collection and for third parties. In the same workshop new trunks are made to order; some of the specially commissioned ones carry the BelMal Malletier or GREENE brand names.

Courses in the restoration and in the manufacture of trunks, and in the travel equipment history, are part of the educational activity of the affiliate Ecole des Malletiers (formerly called BelMal Conservatory) tribute to 16th century trunk-makers Nicolas Gilbert of Brussels, Belgium and Jean Paré of Paris, France.
