= Henri Rapin =

Artist

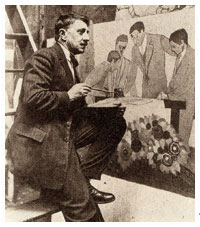
- Henri Rapin
- Born: 24 February 1873; Paris, France
- Died: 30 June 1939 (aged 66); Paris, France
- Occupation(s): Painter, Illustrator, Interior Designer
- Known for: Design work for Sèvres and Moynat
- Notable work: Interiors of the Tokyo Metropolitan Teien Art Museum, Tokyo

Henri Rapin (24 February 1873 – 30 June 1939) was a French painter, illustrator and designer known for his Art Deco inspired contributions in various media including porcelain, leather goods, lighting and interior furnishings.

== Early life and career ==
Born in Paris in 1873, Rapin studied under neoclassical artists Jean-Léon Gérôme and Joseph Blanc at the École des Beaux-Arts.

In 1925 Rapin was responsible for the planning and design of a number of pavilions at the International Exposition of Modern Industrial and Decorative Arts, a landmark Paris event that highlighted the rise of streamlined classicism and geometric styles, later identified by the term, "Art Deco".

Rapin's work at the exposition and cooperative relationship with artists such at René Lalique, Max Ingrand, and Raymond Subes, also directly led to a commission to lead the interior design of a new private residence in Tokyo for Prince Yasuhiko Asaka. Completed in 1933, the residence is now open to the public and known as the Tokyo Metropolitan Teien Art Museum.

== Creative Director at Moynat ==
From 1905 to 1930 Rapin was the artistic director at Moynat, the oldest established French trunk maker. At the 1925, International Exposition of Modern Industrial and Decorative Arts, Rapin's design for a red Morocco leather trunk, was awarded the “Diplôme d'Honneur” and contributed to Moynat's reputation as the leading luxury luggage producer of the era.

== Ceramic work ==
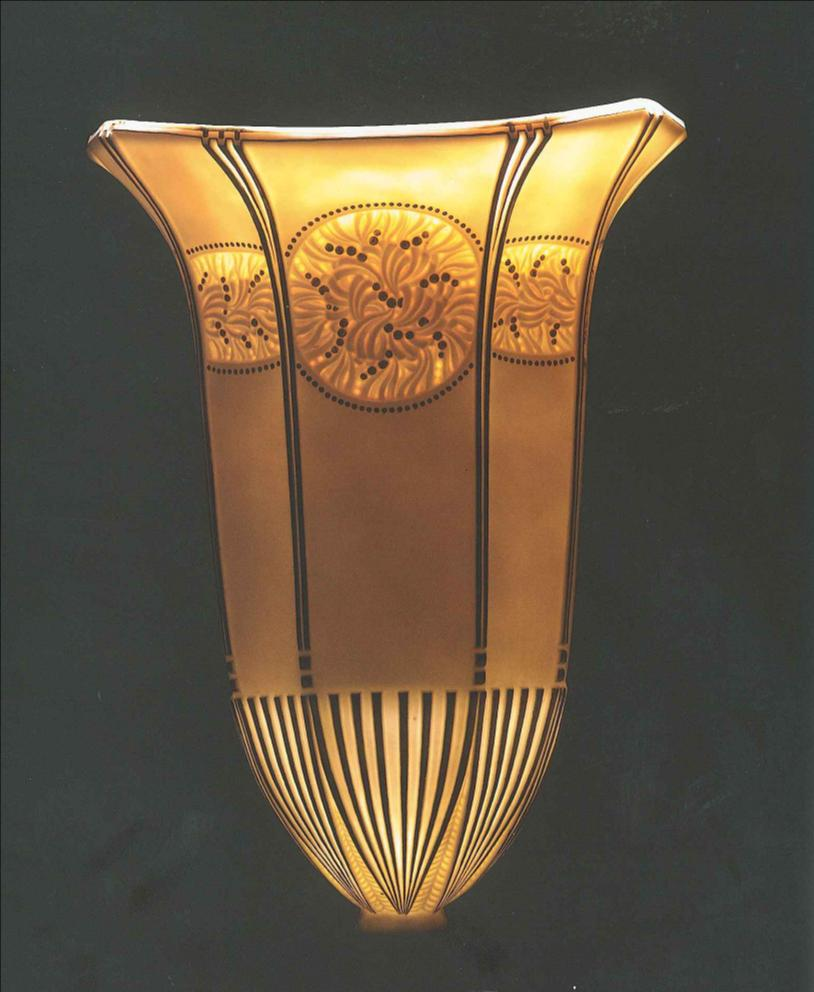
Applique light fixture produced for Sèvres

From 1920 to 1934 Rapin also contributed as an aesthetic advisor to porcelain manufacturer Sèvres. Ceramic blanks for lighting fixtures proved commercially successful, enabling in 1927 Sèvres to reduce its financial dependence on the French state.
