= Malletier =

Manufacturer of luggage and suitcases in French

A malletier is, in French, literally a trunk-maker, or manufacturer of luggage and suitcases.

== Trunkmaking ==
French philosopher Denis Diderot and Jean d'Alembert made mention of a Malletier and his techniques in their Encyclopédie, ou Dictionnaire raisonné des sciences, des métiers et des arts (1713-1784)

== Notable malletiers ==
=== French malletiers ===
The first houses of malletiers appeared in Paris the middle of the 19th century. The most famous historical malletiers include:

Au Départ, founded in 1834 upon the advent of railway travel. In 1847 Au Départ opened a shop at 7 boulevard Denain in Paris, opposite the Gare du Nord. The brand was revived in 2019.

Le Bazar du Voyage, established in 1843 and currently disappeared, is known to be the oldest French malletier.

Aux États-Unis, established in 1845 and disappeared in the late 1980s. The store was located at 229 rue Saint-Honoré in Paris. The house was famous for the monogrammed canvases, composed of diamonds.

La Malle Bernard, established in 1846, is one of the first malletiers to have developed a complete line of luggage and remains as the "oldest trunk maker in existence."

Moynat was established in Paris in 1849 by Pauline Moynat. The House had its own factory in Paris. The store located at the corner of the Avenue de l'Opéra remained opened for one hundred years. In December 2011, a new Moynat boutique was opened at 348 rue Saint-Honoré.

Goyard opened its boutique in 1853 at 233, rue Saint-Honoré in Paris. Edmé Goyard worked as a malletier then known as Maison Morel (founded in 1792), which his son, François bought out in 1853. At that time, the company was formally renamed Goyard. Goyard became a favorite malletier of the international high society including the Grand Duke of Russia, the Maharajah de Kapurthala, and The Duke and Duchess of Windsor. Goyard is known for their special orders.

Louis Vuitton, founded in 1854, was the first malletier to manufacture a flat-topped trunk, "gray Trianon canvas flat trunk" that was lightweight and airtight. All trunks before this had rounded tops for water to run off, and thus could not be stacked. It remains as the world's most popular luggage maker today.

=== Malletiers outside France ===
- Outside of Europe, notable malletiers include Innovation, Belber, Haskell Brothers, MM Secor, Clinton, Hartmann, Oshkosh, Molloy, Torode, Truesdale, Wallace, Taylor and Bodenhorst.
