= Charlotte Eskildsen =

Danish fashion designer

- Born: Charlotte Hesselbjerg Eskildsen; 4 January 1975 (age 50); Kolding, Denmark
- Occupation: Fashion designer
- Labels: Designers Remix; Little Remix
- Spouse: Niels Hesselbjerg Eskildsen (m. 2004)
- Children: Two
- Parents: Anders Hesselbjerg Eskildsen; Bente Hesselbjerg Eskildsen

Charlotte Eskildsen is a Danish fashion designer.

== Early life ==
Charlotte Hesselbjerg Eskildsen was born on 4 January 1975 in Kolding, Denmark. She is the first daughter of Anders and Bente Hesselbjerg Eskildsen.

She married Niels Hesselbjerg Eskildsen on 30 January 2002. Together they have two children; daughters Smilla Hesselbjerg Eskildsen (born 2006) and Sofine Hesselbjerg Eskildsen (born 2010).

== Career ==
In 1999, Eskildsen graduated as design manager from the design academy in Kolding. After finishing her degree she started working for IC Companys (a Danish listed fashion group). In 2002, she established Designers Remix by Charlotte Eskildsen with her husband. At the beginning the brand was owned by IC Companys. However, in 2009, the couple acquired 49% of the stock of Designers Remix A/S.

As creative director for Designers Remix she had a strong design signature. She took an architectural approach to the design process. Her approach employs artistic ideas, minimalism, 3D tailoring, draping and cutting. Her vision is to create an avant-garde angle on modern classics such as the tuxedo and the little black dress. Her inspiration springs from her Danish heritage. Danish design icons, organic modernism and functionalism appear throughout creations.

From 2005 and forward, Designers Remix displayed during Copenhagen Fashion Week. In 2010–2011, Designers Remix appeared on the official show calendar of London Fashion Week.

In 2008, Eskildsen launched her children's collection "Little Remix". The collection holds thin cashmere knits employing a toned down colour scale, cool prints and fashion pieces.

She worked as an ambassador for the Danish Red Cross as a member of Club 10 and committed to raise money for the Red Cross Disaster Relief Fund. She raised the 3rd largest donation in Club 10 in 2009.

== Awards ==
In 2004, Eskildsen was chosen as a "Rising Star" by Danish business magazine, Berlingske. In 2007, Charlotte received the "Golden Pin" (Guldknappen) from the Danish fashion magazine Alt for Damerne. Charlotte was nominated as the "Best Danish Designer" by 400 fashion professionals at the first Danish Fashion Awards. In 2012, she received the Dansk Fashion Award when Designers Remix was voted 'Brand of the Year' 2012. In 2013, she received an Elle Style Award for "Brand of the Year 2013" on behalf of Designers Remix.
