= Moynat =

French luxury fashion company

- Company type: Subsidiary
- Founded: 1849
- Founder: Pauline Moynat, Octavie et François Coulembier
- Headquarters: 348, rue Saint Honoré, Paris, France
- Key people: Lisa Attia (CEO); Nicholas Knightly (Creative Director)
- Products: Trunks, leather goods, perfume
- Parent: LVMH
- Website: moynat.com

Moynat (French pronunciation: [mwana]) is a Parisian trunkmaker, founded in Paris in 1849 by Octavie and François Coulembier. They collaborated with specialist Pauline Moynat in travel goods to open the company's first store at Avenue de l'Opera, France. The house participated in various World's Fairs.

== History ==
=== Early years ===
The House of Moynat was the result of a meeting between Pauline Moynat, who sold travel goods in the Opera district of Paris, and the Coulembier family, manufacturers from the faubourgs—the inner suburbs to the north of the city.

In 1849, the trunk makers opened their first atelier. They joined with Pauline Moynat to open the Moynat boutique in 1869 on what was then the Place du Théâtre Français (now the Place André Malraux), opposite the famous Comédie-Française.

Moynat patented its first inventions for packaging materials in 1854. The label was the first to use hardened gutta-percha waterproofing to produce its trunks and packing boxes. In 1870, Moynat brought out the wicker trunk, known as the "English trunk" or "Moynat trunk". The boutique was situated at the center of Haussmann's redesigned Paris. Following the construction of the Avenue de l'Opéra in 1876, it took pride of place at path number 1.

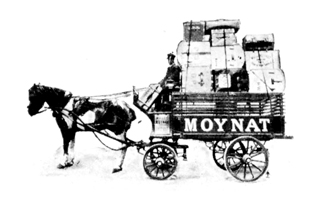
A Moynat horse cart, 1880

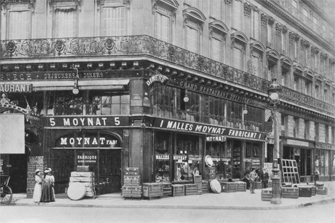
The first Moynat Boutique Avenue de l'Opéra in 1869

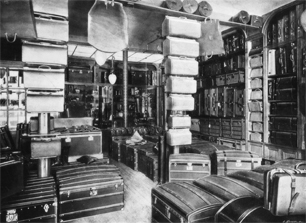
Interior of the Moynat Boutique, 1907

=== 1905–1976 ===
==== Collaboration with Henri Rapin ====
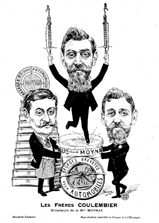
The Coulembier brothers, Moynat directors, 1906

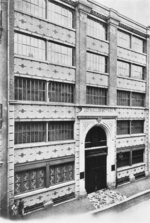
The Moynat factory, rue Coysevox in 1907

In 1889, Jules Coulembier created a new system of lightweight trunks, followed in 1910 by the invention of an extra-light model. The House of Moynat also produced a series of security mechanisms for its trunks.

In 1905, Moynat began a long-lasting collaboration with Henri Rapin. Rapin designed the logos of the House, the Moynat monogram, illustrated the product catalogues and conceived the models presented at universal and international exhibitions. In 1907, the Coulembier family began construction on a model factory at 15 rue Coysevox up at Montmartre.

Moynat was a regular participant in the World's Fairs since the second edition in Paris in 1867. The house also took part in the Exposition Universelle in Paris in 1900, Brussels in 1910, was appointed jury member at the Turin exhibition in 1911 and was awarded two gold medals and two special prizes at Ghent in 1913. In 1925, Moynat broke the record at the Exposition Internationale des Arts Décoratifs et Industriels, where its automobile trunks were awarded a Diplôme d’Honneur by its peers together with gold, silver and bronze medals.

=== 1989–present ===
Orcofi, the Vuitton family's holding company, bought Malles et Voyages in 1989, following the disposal of the bulk of its shares in LVMH. Orcofi's CEO, Vuitton's former President Henry Racamier (1912–2003), had planned to relaunch Moynat as a competitor to Louis Vuitton. However, Orcofi was eventually sold to AXA in 1996.

Luxury goods holding company, Luvanis SA, bought the rights into Moynat in the late 2000s, developed a revival plan and assigned the brand to Groupe Arnault. LVMH CEO Bernard Arnault's holding company bought Moynat in 2010. The relaunch was led by CEO Guillaume Davin, with former Hermès designer Ramesh Nair appointed as Artistic Director. In December 2011, Moynat reopened with a store at 348 Rue Saint-Honoré, followed by shops in London in 2014, Hong Kong, Beijing in 2015, Tokyo, New York, Seoul, Taipei in 2016, Singapore in 2017 and Dubai in 2018.

Nicholas Knightly was hired as its new creative director in November of 2022. In December 2022, Pharrell Williams partnered on the launch of a bag in collaboration with Moynat.

In 2023, Moynat scheduled a world tour, the Moynat World Tour. It consists of a roving pop-up. The tour launched in Paris at Le Bon Marche Rive Gauche on February 18. The tour also celebrated and coincided with the 103rd anniversary of Moynats Toile 1920 M, the canvas that is used for their made-to-order luggage.

== See also ==
- Au Départ
- Aux Etats-Unis
- Goyard
- Louis Vuitton

== Bibliography ==
- Bagages en escale, Musée de la Chemiserie et de l'Elégance Masculine
- Barre Fils, M.A. de la, De la Gutta-Percha et de son application aux dentures artificielles, Victor Masson, 1852
- Brunhammer, Yvonne, Catalogue de l’exposition des Porcelaines de Sèvres de style Art Déco au musée Teien de Tokyo 1993
- Caracalla, Jean-Paul, Le goût du Voyage – Histoire de la Compagnie des Wagons-lits, Flammarion, 2001
- Centorame, Bruno (dir.), Autour de la Madeleine. Art, littérature et Société, Paris, Action artistique de la Ville de Paris, 2005
- Chapel, Edmond, Le Caoutchouc et la Gutta-Percha, Ed. Marchal et Billiard, 1892
- Devauges, Jean-Denys, Le voyage en France : du maître de poste au chef de gare, 1740–1914, Réunion des musées nationaux, 1997
- Espanet, Luisa, Valises & Compagnies, Genleman Editeur, 1987
- Gregory, Alexis, L'âge d'or dur voyage 1880-1939, Chêne, 1990
- Havard, Henry, Dictionnaire de l'ameublement et de la décoration depuis le XIIIe siècle jusqu’à nos jours, Fairault, 1901.
- Invitation au voyage, catalogue de l'exposition organisé par l'Union Centrale des Ars décoratifs, Paris, musée des Arts décoratifs, 1987
- Kjellberg, Pierre, Art Déco, les maîtres du mobilier, le décor des paquebots, Éditions de l'Amateur, Paris, 2004.
- Labourdette, Jean Henri, Un siècle de carrosserie française, Edita, 1972
- Loyer, François (dir.), Autour de l'Opéra. Naissance de la ville moderne, Action artistique de la Ville de Paris, 1995
- Rauch, André, Vacances en France de 1830 à nos jours, Hachette Littérature, 2001
- Rolland, Jean-Philippe, Kieffer-Rolland, Marie, Restauration des malles de voyage, Eyrolles, 2008
- Savary de Brûlons, Jérôme, Dictionnaire universel du commerce, Editions Jacques Estienne, 1723–1730
