= Main Bocher =

American fashion designer (1890–1976)

- Born: Main Rousseau Bocher; October 24, 1890; Chicago, Illinois, U.S.
- Died: December 27, 1976 (aged 86)
- Education: studied art at the University of Chicago and the Chicago Academy of Fine Arts
- Occupation: Editor-in-chief of the French edition of Vogue
- Known for: The short evening dress; the famous beaded evening sweaters; the strapless evening gown; bare-armed blouses for suits; the costume-dyed furs
- Partner: Douglas Pollard
- Awards: Bronze plaque on New York City's Fashion Walk of Fame

Main Rousseau Bocher (October 24, 1890 – December 27, 1976), also known as Mainbocher, was an American couturier best known for the eponymous fashion label he founded in 1929. Although often pronounced "Man-bo-shay," his name is pronounced "Maine-Bocker."

== Early life ==
Bocher was a native of Chicago, where he studied at the Lewis Institute, now the Illinois Institute of Technology, and the Chicago Academy of Fine Arts. He served in intelligence during World War I and stayed in Paris after the war, working as a fashion illustrator for Harper's Bazaar, as Paris fashion editor for Vogue (1922-1929), and eventually became the editor-in-chief of the French edition of Vogue in early 1927. Main Bocher's decision to become a couturier grew out of his years as editor at Vogue; he realized that his critical eye and his feeling for fashion might also serve him as a designer.

== Innovations ==
Mainbocher's innovations include short evening dresses; beaded evening sweaters; the strapless evening gown; bare-armed blouses for suits; costume-dyed furs (black mink and black sealskin); novel uses for batiste, voile, organdy, piqué, linen, and embroidered muslin; the waistcinch; man-tailored dinner suits; bows instead of hats; the principle of the simple dress with many tie-ons (shirt-like aprons, changeable jackets); the sari evening dress; the "bump" shoulder (a sort of modified leg-o'-mutton sleeve) on suits and coats; the evening version of the "tennis dress," a white evening dress with "V" neck and stole; the revival of crinolines; and the rain suit.

== Legacy ==
In 2002, Mainbocher was honored with a bronze plaque on New York City's Fashion Walk of Fame in the legendary garment district.

Christian Dior said of him, "Mainbocher is really in advance of us all, because he does it in America."

Media offices
Preceded by Cosette Vogel	Editor-in-Chief of Vogue Paris; 1927–1929	Succeeded by Michel de Brunhoff
