= Alain Figaret =

The brand is now called Figaret Paris and is a French luxury shirt brand.

== Overview ==
The brand was launched in 1968 by Alain Figaret. The first boutique was opened in Biarritz (France), then in 1970 the brand opened a store on rue de Longchamp in Paris under the name of Princeton. The first shop entirely devoted to shirts under the brand Alain Figaret was opened in 1976 on the Rue de la Paix, and is now the brand's flagship store.

In 1992, Fabrice Figaret joined the family business. He first decides to consolidate the business and then to accelerate the development of the brand, both in France and overseas. Under his tenure, the turnover of the company tripled. Figaret becomes one of the few international brands that is vertically integrated, it controls the entire process from sourcing, production, to distribution in its own proprietary retail network.

In 2005, the Groupe EPI took a majority stake in the brand. The EPI group Descours Family today owns Bonpoint, Piper-Heidsieck et J.M. Weston.

In 2008, the remaining members of the Figaret family sold their shares to the Descours Family.

In 2017, the fund Experienced Capital Partner, specialised in affordable luxury, takes a 70 % stake in the brand. A plan to revive the brand is implemented.
