= Octave Denis Victor Guillonnet =

French painter

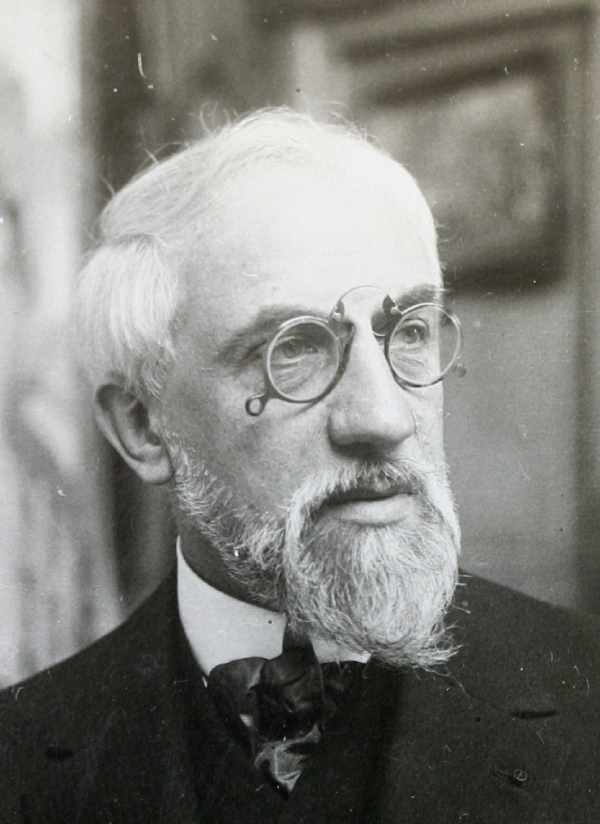
Guillonnet c. 1930

Octave Denis Victor Guillonnet (22 September 1872 – 25 September 1967) was a French painter and medallic artist.

His selected works include

- Portrait of his wife Emile in their garden
- A lazy afternoon (n.d.)
- Au jardin (n.d.)
- Le Retour du Troupeau (The Return of the Herd) (n.d.)
- Les Baigneuses, Ce d'Azur (n.d.)
- Garden party (1920)
- Stillife with Yellow Roses and Parrot (1962)
