= Designers Remix =

Danish fashion house

Designers Remix is a Danish fashion house founded in 2002 by Charlotte Eskildsen. Eskildsen is the creative director and head of design.

Designers Remix was created by Charlotte Eskildsen after she was hired by IC Companies in 2002 to construct new brands. At the time, the collection was made from “leftovers” of the other IC Companies' brands– hence the name Designers Remix. In 2006, Charlotte and her partner Niels Eskildsen purchased 49% of the company stock, creating Designers Remix A/S. Charlotte then redesigned the collection and took the brand forward with her own signature design, "DNA".

Danish design icons, organic modernism, and functionalism are the key parts of her creative process. Eskildsen has a minimalistic approach to her designs, which is seen in geometric, organic and asymmetrical silhouettes, with 3D accents.

== Awards ==
In 2012, Designers Remix received the "Danish Fashion Award" (Dansk Fashion Award) in the category "Brand of the Year"

In 2013, Designers Remix received an "Elle Style Award" in the category "Brand of the Year".

== Little Remix ==
In 2008, she created Little Remix, a clothing line for girls aged 6 to 16. Charlotte's first daughter Smilla is the model for Little Remix campaigns. The collection includes thin cashmere knits, a toned down colour scale and cool prints.

The signed prints of the collections always portray a quirky girl (sketched by Smilla). In some prints, she is diving, while in others, she is playing in a girl band.
