= Rue de la Paix, Paris =

Street in Paris, France

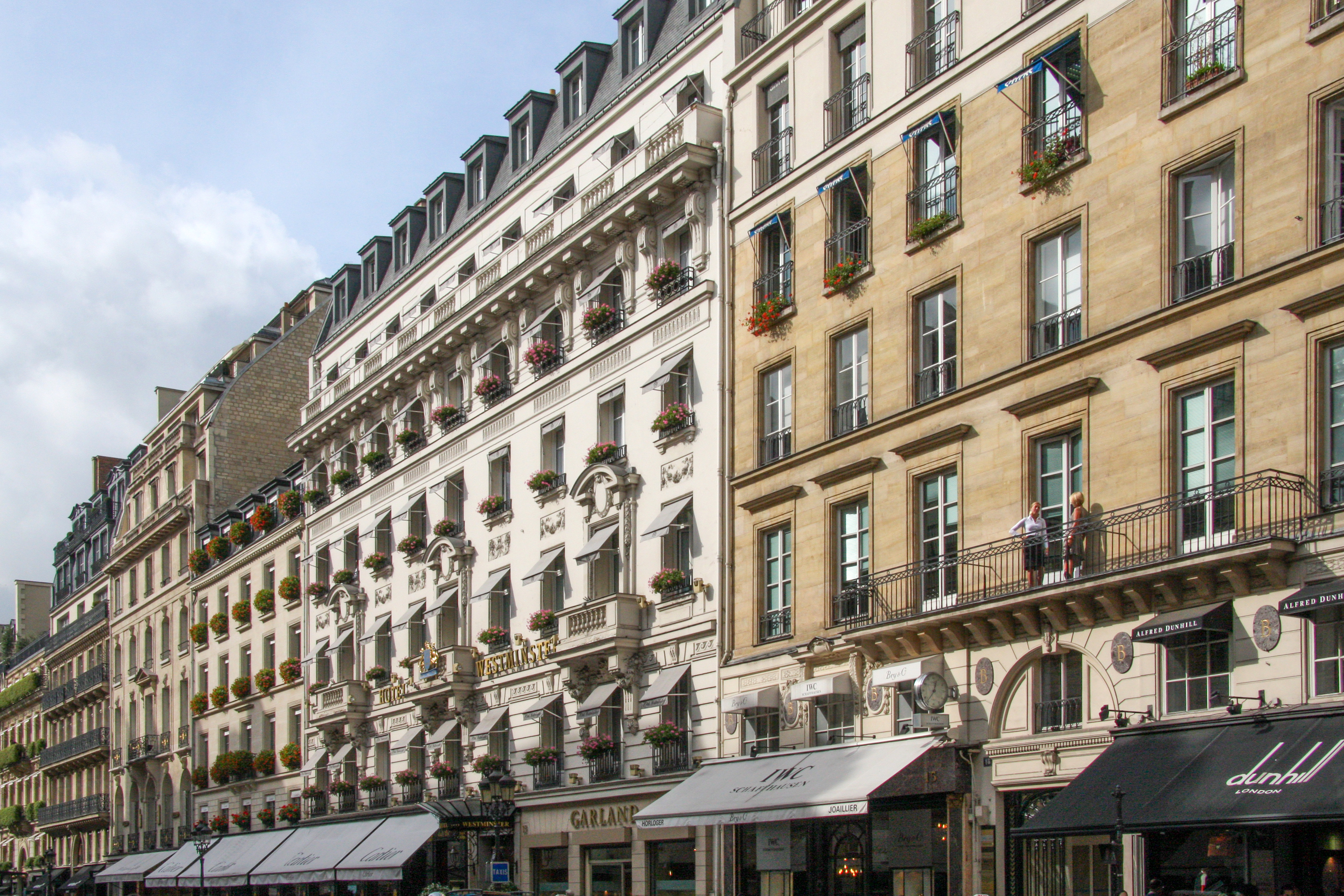
- Hôtel Westminster on the Rue de la Paix

- Location within Paris
- Length: 230 m (750 ft)
- Width: 22.50 m (73.8 ft)
- Arrondissement: 2nd
- Quarter: Gaillon
- Coordinates: 48°52′8.87″N 2°19′52.06″E
- From: 2 Rue des Capucines and 32 Rue Danielle Casanova
- To: 1 Place de l'Opéra

Construction
- Completed: 19 February 1806

The Rue de la Paix (French: [ʁy də la pɛ]; lit. 'Peace Street') is a fashionable shopping street in the centre of Paris. Located in the 2nd arrondissement, it runs north from the Place Vendôme and ends at the Opéra Garnier.

The street is best known for its jewellers, such as the shop opened by Cartier in 1898. Charles Frederick Worth was the first to open a couture house in the Rue de la Paix. Many buildings on the street are inspired in design by the hôtels particuliers of the Place Vendôme.

== History ==
The street was opened in 1806 from the Place Vendôme on the orders of Napoleon, part of the Napoleonic program to open the heart of the Right Bank of Paris, both towards the undeveloped western suburbs and to the north. Creating the new street required the demolition of the ancient Convent of the Capucins. At first named the Rue Napoléon, its name was changed in 1814, after the Bourbon Restoration, to celebrate the newly arranged peace.

During the Paris Commune, the street saw a demonstration protesting against the commune government. On 22 March 1871, National Guard soldiers, who were commanded by Jules Bergeret, after being fired upon, fired into a crowd of mostly unarmed marchers that were heading to the Place Vendôme. The resulting bloodshed saw twelve protestors killed and a soldier. The event has been termed the Massacre in the Rue de la Paix. It was the first act of violence against the Parisian citizens since the Siege of Paris ended two months before.

== Transport ==
Based in the centre of Paris, the street can be reached by:

- Métro: Line 1
- Or bus: 72.

== Associated retail outlets ==
- Boué Soeurs, a fashion house active from the late 1890s to early 1950s.
- Cartier, 1898.
- Charles Frederick Worth was the first to open a couture house at 7 Rue de la Paix, and in 1885 created the label of his salon "Worth 7, Rue de la Paix".
- Duvelleroy is a fan-maker house established at 15 Rue de la Paix in 1827 by Jean-Pierre Duvelleroy.
- House of Paquin, 1891
- Louis Aucoc; the Aucoc family firm at 6 Rue de la Paix was established in 1821.
- Maison Maquet, a luxury stationery and leather goods manufacturer, was located at no. 20 from 1841 to 1846, then at no. 24 from 1847 to 1867, and finally at no. 10 from 1868, where it remained for about a century.
- Offenthal is a luxury leather-goods maker established at 24 rue de la Paix in 1935. The boutique closed its doors in 1995.

In 1847, all even numbers in the Rue de la Paix south of the junction with the Rue Daunou changed up by two following the redevelopment of no. 4 into two units, becoming nos. 4 and 6. Due to the anomaly of being two no. 14 on the corners either side of the Rue Daunou, the numbers north of this road were increased by four. Therefore, Maison Maguet did not physically move location, it was just their street number within the address that changed. The famous jeweller and clockmaker Athanase Bourdin had his shop at no. 24, as a part of the Hotel Canterbury, with the number of both changing to 28 in 1847 although neither moved location. No. 28 was demolished in 1868 to make way for the new boulevard fronting the Opera House. Prior to 1847, Louis Aucoc had their address as Rue de la Paix 4, only becoming no. 6 after this date.

== In popular culture ==
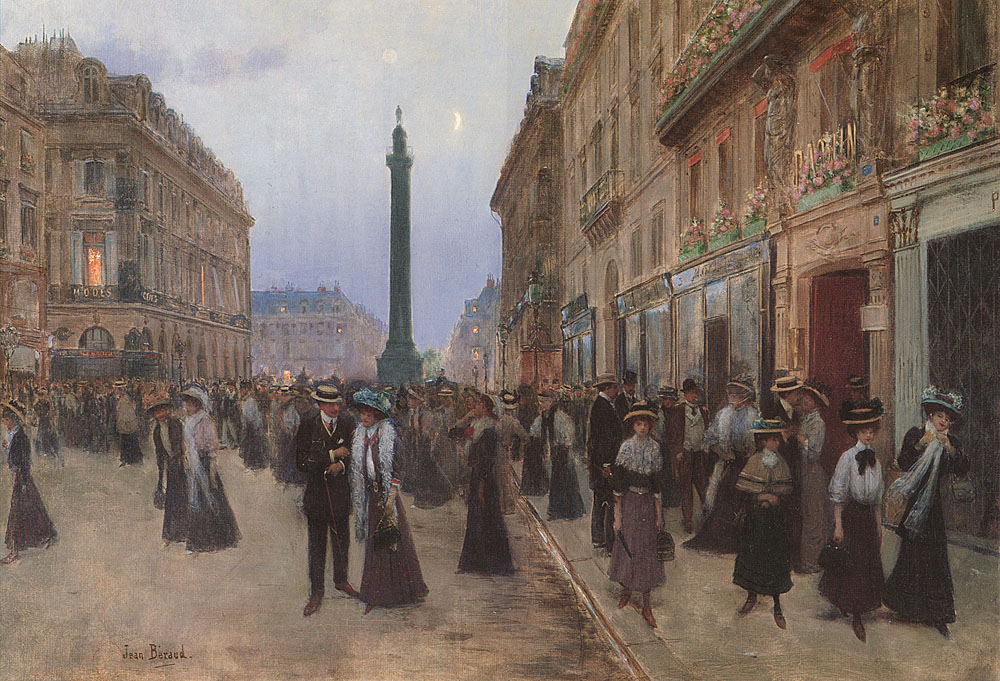
Rue de la Paix by Jean Béraud, 1907

- The Rue de la Paix is the most expensive property in the French version of Monopoly – the equivalent to "Boardwalk" in the American version, or "Mayfair" in the UK version.
- Due to this, the Rue de la Paix is referenced by French singer Zazie in her song of the same name, in which she compares societies based on consumerism to a game of Monopoly.
- The Rue de la Paix is mentioned by Rhett Butler in the novel Gone with the Wind by Margaret Mitchell as the source of the green bonnet purchased to bring Scarlett O'Hara out of mourning.
- One of the villains in Where in Time Is Carmen Sandiego? is named "Rudy Lepay".
- Also mentioned in the Noël Coward song: "Parisian Pierrot" (recorded 1936); "...The Rue de la Paix is under your sway..."
- Also mentioned in the Leonard Gershe Rodger Edens song "Bonjour Paris" featured in the 1957 film Funny Face.
- In the closing scene of the 2019 X-Men film Dark Phoenix, Charles Xavier and Erik Lehnsherr play chess outside a café located on the Rue de la Paix.
