= Charles James (designer) =

British-born fashion designer

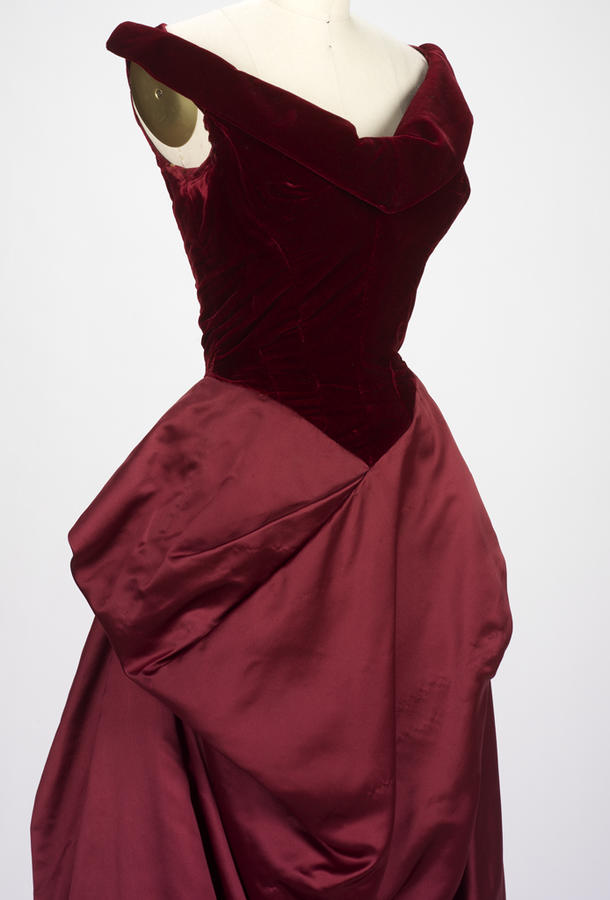
- Evening gown, 1955, RISD Museum
- Born: Charles Wilson Brega James; 18 July 1906; Camberley, England
- Died: 23 September 1978 (aged 72); New York City, U.S.
- Partner: Nancy Lee Gregory (1954–61)
- Children: 2
- Awards: Coty Award (1950 and 1954); Neiman Marcus Fashion Award (1953)
- Website: charles-james.com

Charles Wilson Brega James (18 July 1906 – 23 September 1978) was an English-American fashion designer. He is best known for his ballgowns and highly structured aesthetic. James is one of the most influential fashion designers of the 20th century and continues to influence new generations of designers.

== Early life ==
James' father, Ralph Ernest Haweis James, was a British army officer and instructor at Royal Military Academy Sandhurst. His mother, Louise Enders Brega, came from a wealthy Chicago family. He was educated at The New Beacon in Sevenoaks, Kent from 1914 to 1918. In 1919, he attended Harrow School where he met Evelyn Waugh, Francis Cyril Rose, and Cecil Beaton, with whom he formed a longstanding friendship. He was expelled from Harrow for a "sexual escapade".

After that, James briefly studied music at the University of Bordeaux in France before he went to Chicago to work. The utilities magnate Samuel Insull, a friend of the family, found him a position in the architectural design department where he acquired the mathematical skills that later enabled him to create his gowns.

At the age of nineteen, James opened his first milliner shop in Chicago, using the name of "Charles Boucheron", as his father forbade him to use that of James.

== Career ==
=== From Charles Boucheron to Charles James ===
In 1928, James left Chicago for Long Island with 70 cents, a Pierce Arrow, and a number of hats as his only possessions. He later opened a millinery shop above a garage in Murray Hill, Queens, New York, beginning his first dress designs. At the time, he presented himself as a "sartorial structural architect". By 1930, he had designed the spiral zipped dress and the taxi dress ("so easy to wear it could be slipped on in the backseat of a taxi").

From New York James moved to London, setting up shop in Mayfair. He designed the wedding dress for Baba Beaton, Cecil Beaton's sister, for her marriage to Alec Hambro on 6 November 1934. James created a modern interpretation of the white wedding dress, with a raised neckline and divided train. In 1936, he established the company Charles James (London) Ltd., using his own name officially for the first time.

James also spent time in Paris in the early 1930s, working from the Hôtel Lancaster. He showed his first collection in the French capital in 1937. That same year, he created a one-of-a-kind white satin quilted jacket described by Salvador Dalí as "the first soft sculpture" and now in the Victoria and Albert Museum collections. This jacket has been considered the starting point for "anoraks, space man and even fur jackets". In the 1930s, he also invented the Pavlovian waistband that expands after a meal.

Meanwhile, he licensed his fashion designs with American department stores such as Lord & Taylor and Bergdorf Goodman.

=== New York career ===
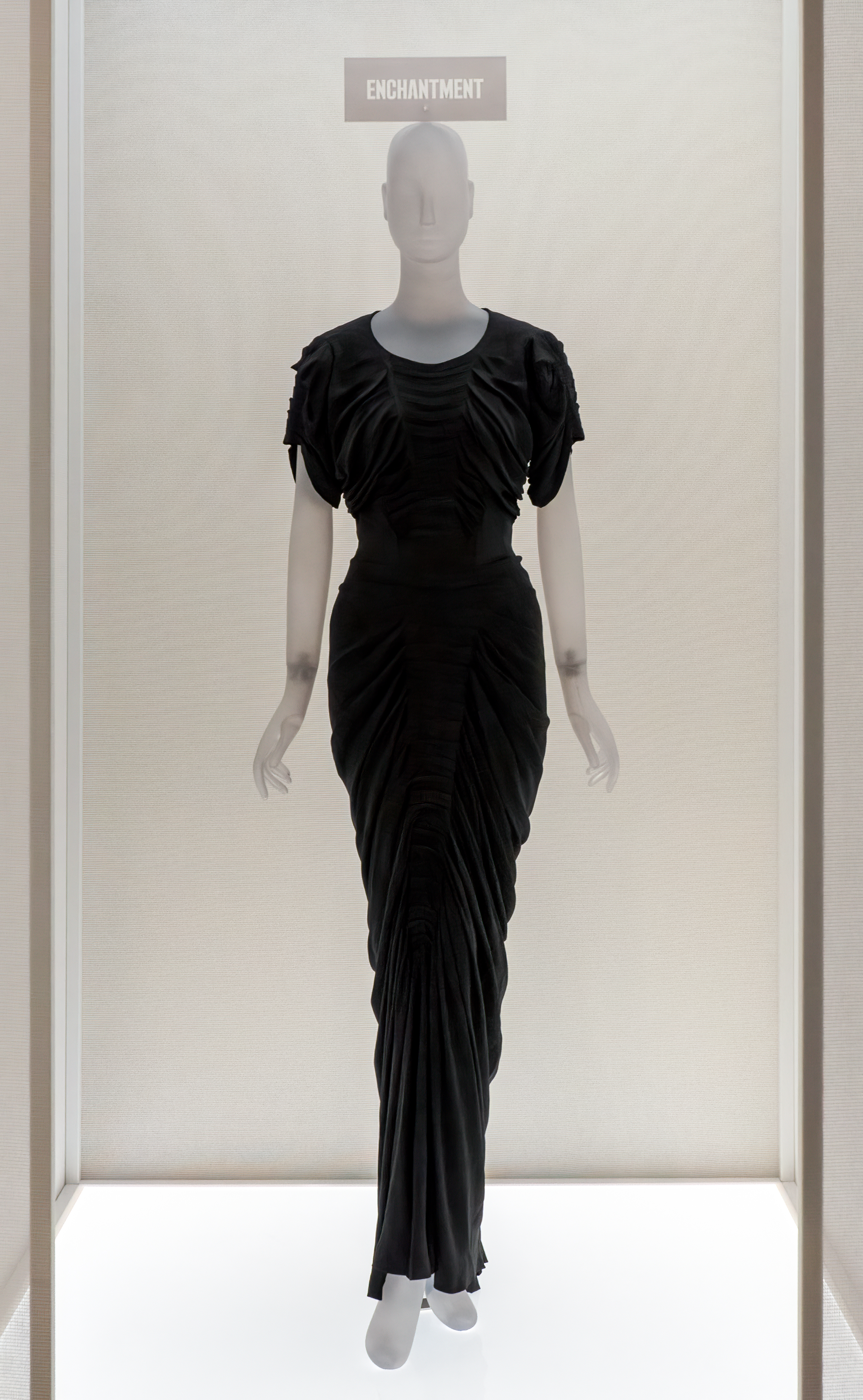
James' "La Sirene" dress from 1941 on display at the Metropolitan Museum of Art's exhibition, In America: A Lexicon of Fashion

James moved permanently to New York in 1939 where he established Charles James, Inc. At the end of the Second World War, he designed a clothing line for Elizabeth Arden.

In 1947, James showed a collection in Paris. The following year, Millicent Rogers organized an exhibition of the outfits he made for her at the Brooklyn Museum, entitled "A Decade of Design for Mrs Millicent H. Rogers by Charles James". Also in 1948, Cecil Beaton famously photographed eight of James' creations for Vogue.

In the early 1950s, James spent most of his time in New York City at his Madison Avenue workshop. He won two Coty Awards, in 1950 and 1954, and one Neiman Marcus Award in 1953. That year he conceived the "Four-Leaf Clover" or "Abstract" ballgown for the journalist Austine Hearst. It was the dress James ranked as his best creation. This dress weighed no less than 12 pounds and had to be supported by a rigid structure.

James is best known for his sculpted ball gowns made of lavish fabrics and to exacting tailoring standards, but is also remembered for his capes and coats, often trimmed with fur and embroidery.

Arnold Scaasi worked for James for two years. Scaasi was notably in charge of the ready-to-wear line. After he left, James dropped the line and returned to licensing special designs to American departments, which would produce and distribute them.

He designed the interior and several pieces of furniture for the Houston home of John and Dominique de Menil.

James retired in 1958.

== Personal life ==
In 1954, James married Nancy Lee Gregory from Kansas, 20 years his junior. They had a son and daughter. After the birth of their son, James produced a children's collection. The marriage dissolved in 1961.

In 1964, he moved to the Hotel Chelsea where he had three sixth-floor rooms for his work space, office, and apartment. James died in 1978 of bronchial pneumonia.

== Legacy ==
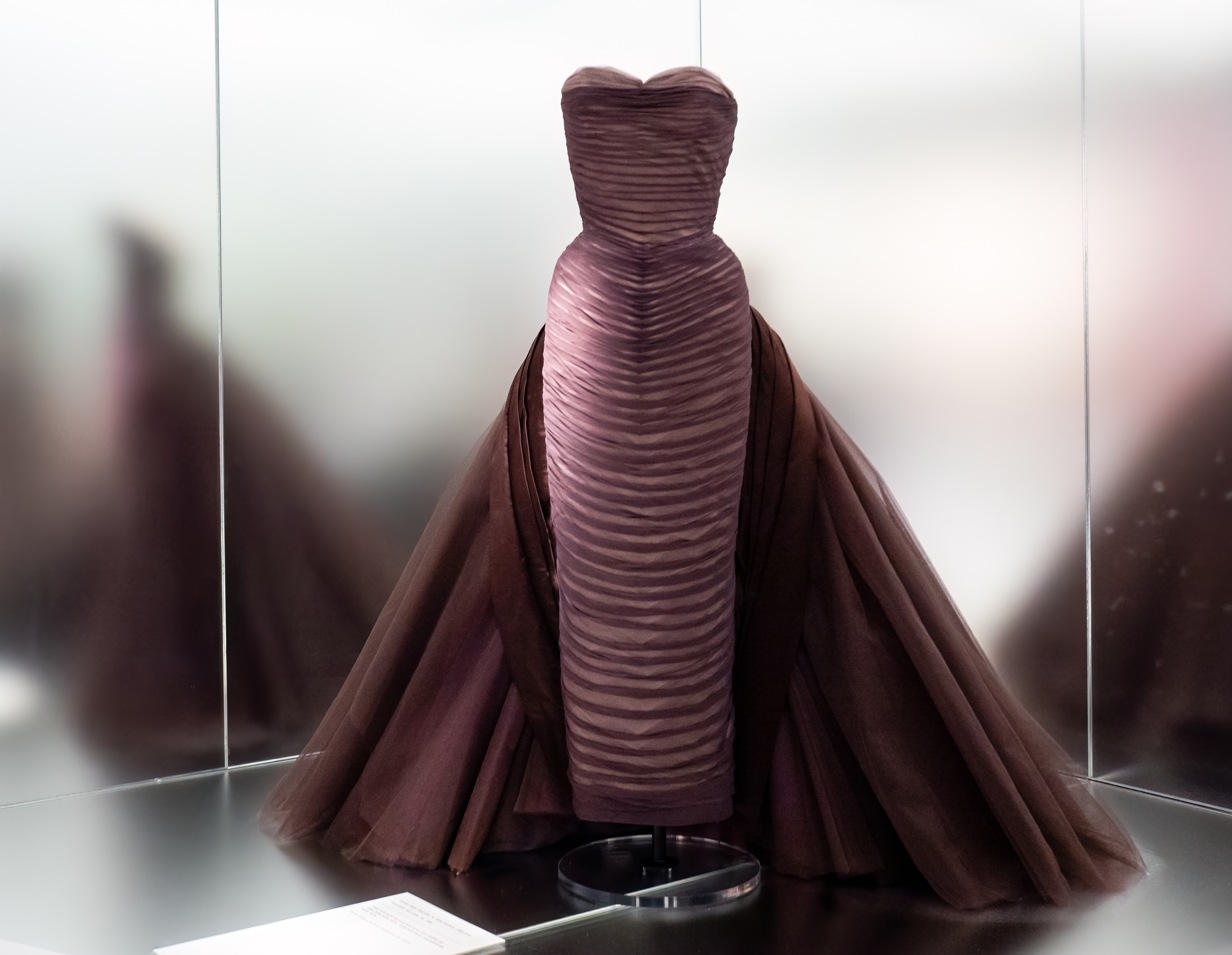
"Butterfly" ball gown, circa 1955, featured in the 2024 Metropolitan Museum of Art exhibition Sleeping Beauties: Reawakening Fashion

=== Influence on fashion designers ===
According to Harold Koda, former curator-in-chief at The Costume Institute, James "transformed fashion design". James inspired many designers, including Christian Dior, who said he was "the greatest talent of my generation". Dior credited James with inspiring The New Look.

=== Museum exhibitions ===
The Brooklyn Museum presented "The Genius of Charles James" from October 1982 to January 1983.

The Chicago History Museum exhibited "Charles James: Genius Deconstructed" between October 2011 and April 2012.

In 2014, James's work was the subject of the opening exhibition of the Metropolitan Museum of Art's newly renovated Anna Wintour Costume Center entitled "Charles James: Beyond Fashion". At a preview of the exhibit, Elettra Wiedemann modeled a replica of the "Four-Leaf Clover" ballgown.

In July 2014, longtime friend R. Couri Hay shared sketches by James, along with stories and anecdotes about the late designer with New York Magazine.

=== James without Charles James ===
In May 2014, concomitantly to the James retrospective at the Metropolitan Museum, The Weinstein Company (TWC) announced it had signed a license agreement with James's heirs, Charles Jr. and Louise James, to produce new collections, and thus contribute to the brand revival. Two years of legal battle followed between the heirs and the Luvanis company, which had already registered the brand in an array of jurisdictions worldwide.

At the time, Zac Posen was rumored to be the next artistic designer of the brand.

In June 2016, TWC withdrew, and Luvanis thereafter partnered with James' heirs to revive the Charles James brand. In September 2018, they revealed a new visual identity for Charles James, and put up for sale all the brand's rights, which had been consolidated in the previous years.

== In popular culture ==
In the movie Phantom Thread the character Reynolds Woodcock's (played by Daniel Day-Lewis) obsessive fastidiousness is loosely inspired by Charles James.
