= Goyard =

French fashion house

Goyard St-Honore SAS

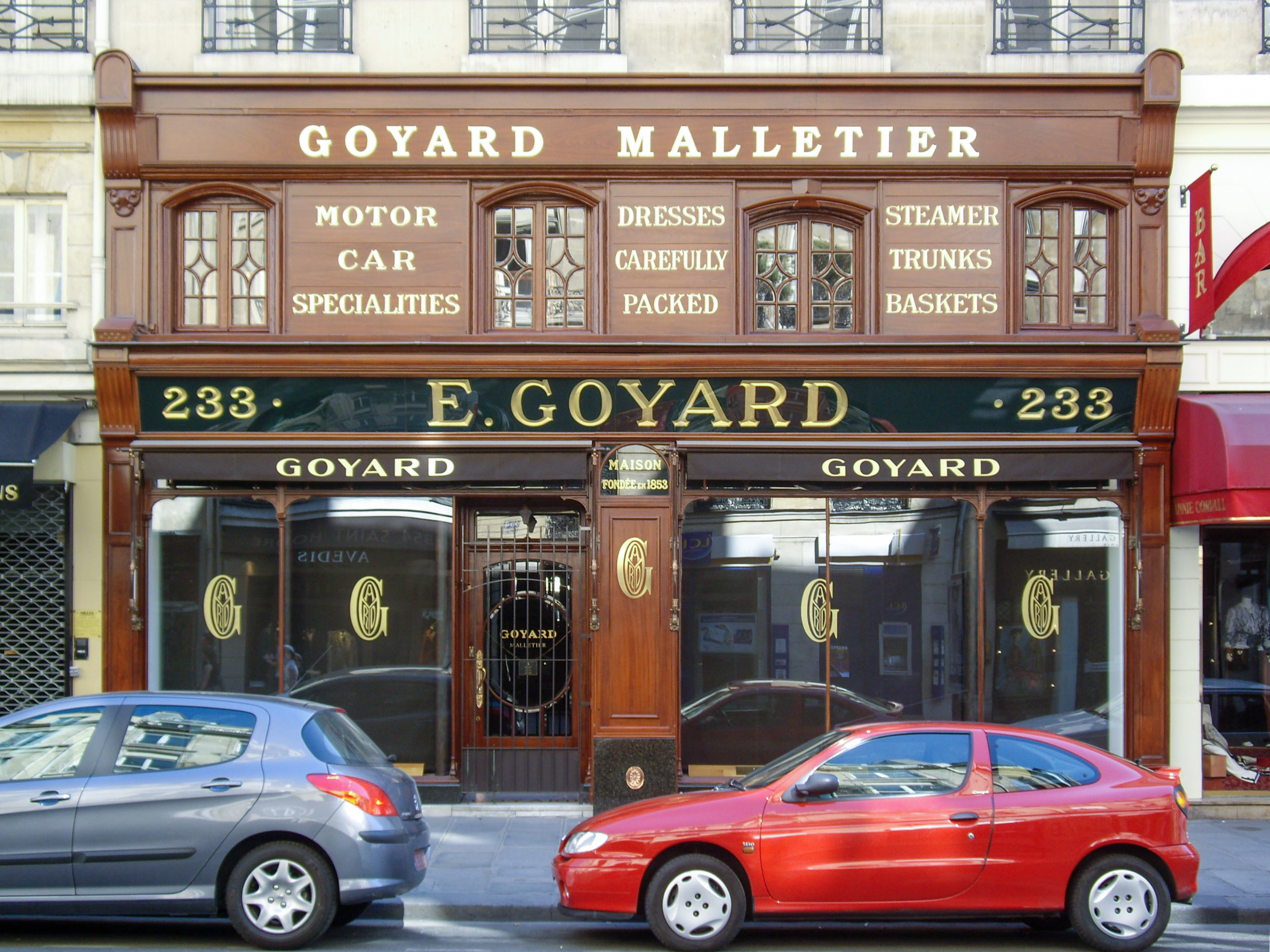
- Flagship location, 233 rue Saint-Honoré, Paris
- Formerly: Maison Martin, Maison Morel (1792-1853)
- Company type: Private
- Industry: Luxury goods
- Founded: 1853; 173 years ago
- Headquarters: Paris, France
- Key people: François Goyard (1826–1890); Edmond Goyard (1860–1937); Robert Goyard (1893–1979); François Goyard (1918–2005); Isabelle Goyard; Nate Goyard; Jean-Michel Signoles
- Products: Trunks; leather goods; pet accessories
- Website: goyard.com

Goyard (French pronunciation: [ɡɔjaʁ]) is a French trunk maker founded in 1853 in Paris. The company originated as Maison Morel, which was later acquired by François Goyard (1828-1890), establishing the Goyard family in the trade of trunk making and luxury packing. His son Edmond Goyard (1860-1937) expanded the brand and developed its reputation between 1885 and 1937. Robert Goyard (1893-1979) continued its growth, particularly in the post-war period. In 1998, Jean-Michel Signoles took over the Maison, contributing to its international expansion while maintaining its heritage and craftsmanship.

== History ==
=== Maison Morel ===
Maison Morel was official purveyor to Marie-Caroline of Bourbon-Two Sicilies, Duchess of Berry, an honour that granted it the title of "box maker, trunk maker and packer of Her Royal Highness The Duchess of Berry". Maison Martin's store sign featured references to the three traditional crafts of "box making, trunk making and packing" that were at the core of its business. Pierre François Martin was the guardian of a young female ward, Pauline Moutat, and gave his business as her dowry. He was also instrumental in arranging her marriage to one of his employees, Louis-Henri Morel (1817–1852). Morel followed on Martin's footsteps, and introduced himself as the "Successor to former Maison Morel, located on rue Neuve-des-Capucines, near Place Vendôme."

In turn, Louis-Henri Morel, passed on his skills and knowledge to a seventeen-year-old apprentice by the name of François Goyard, whom he hired in 1845. The apprentice received a state-of-the-art training under the dual guidance of Pierre François Martin and Louis-Henri Morel. Monsieur Morel died suddenly on 24 August 1852.

=== Maison Goyard ===
In a short time, the house's corporate name changed from Morel to Goyard, and from Goyard to Goyard Aîné (French for "elder", François being the firstborn among Goyard brothers), as to differentiate himself from his siblings. When he died, François Goyard left his son Edmond with a very reputable business with workshops in Bezons, a city in the northwestern suburbs of Paris.

In 1834, Pierre François Martin moved his store from 4, Rue Neuve des Capucines, where Louis Vuitton opened in 1854, to 347, rue Saint-Honoré. On account of the new street numbering policy implemented in Paris in 1856, the address changed to 233, rue Saint-Honoré. His successors remained at this location at the corner of rue Saint-Honoré and rue de Castiglione, near Place Vendôme. After a thirty-two-year-tenure as head of business, François handed the company over to his 25-year-old eldest son Edmond on April 1, 1885. The house changed its name to E. Goyard Aîné.

Edmond Goyard, drawing on his father François Goyard's work, turned the store on rue Saint-Honoré into an increasingly elitist luxury brand with an international clientele. He created the first Goyard advertisements, participated in various World Expositions and opened four branch stores. He also laid the foundations for the brand as we know it today, as he came up with the Goyardine canvas, launched a pet accessories range and developed products for automobiles. He partnered with his eldest son Robert, and together they ran E. Goyard Aîné et Fils (E.Goyard Elder and Son). Robert followed his father's footsteps and ran the business from 1937 to 1979.

In 1998, a purchaser took over from the Goyard family: Jean-Michel Signoles, a keen collector of all things Goyard, undertook the challenge of reinventing Goyard with the help of his sons. Without the backing of a leading luxury brand group, he exploited the heritage of the house, built new workshops in Carcassonne, France, and opened retail stores all over the world.

==== From Clamecy to Paris ====
The Goyards originated from Clamecy in Burgundy, where the family males had long worked as log drivers. They were members of the Compagnons de Rivière, a guild of transporters moving firewood to Paris. The family name "Goyard" derives from the French "goujard", also spelled "goyard". This sickle-like tool with a blade attached to a two-metre-long strong wooden handle was used by the Bourguignon people from the Aube area to cut thorns they would then transplant onto hedgerow stakes.

==== Edmé Goyard (1801–1879) moves to Paris ====
In 1832, a massive cholera epidemic decimated the population of Clamecy. On 17 December, Edmé Goyard's father died at the age of 72. His son subsequently left the hamlet with his wife and two sons, François and Claude, who were respectively four and two-years old. The family settled down in Paris and soon welcomed another son, Martin, who was born on 10 October 1833.

==== Robert Goyard (1893–1979) ====
Just like his father did, Robert ran the store until his demise in 1979. His impact on the house proved considerable, as he constantly updated the range of products, notably by developing a new canvas. He patented the design for this woven canvas in 1965. The Chevron pattern remained, and the overall design was simplified, as the production process required, leaving the canvas bare of any name.

Robert Goyard was also determined to contribute to the prestige of his neighbourhood. On 9 December 1936, the Place Vendôme Association was set up; on 25 July 1944, an extraordinary general meeting aiming to reform the association was held. The association initially changed its name to "Place Vendôme, Rue de la Paix and surroundings" before opting for "Comité Vendôme", its current name. Robert Goyard was instrumental in setting up this cooperative agreement by taking care of the formalities for its constitution and locating its offices at Goyard's headquarters at 233, rue Saint-Honoré.

==== François Goyard (1918–2005) ====
Jean Edmond François was the son of Robert Goyard, and collaborated with his father. The Occupation took its toll on the house, and the store at 233, rue Saint-Honoré closed down temporarily. François took a stake in the family business on 25 May 1951, which became a limited company four days later. After the end of World War II, Robert resumed running the company until 1979; upon his death, his granddaughter Isabelle Goyard took over with the help of her father.

== Participation to world expositions ==
Exposition	Year	Location	Prize	Source
Exposition Universelle	1900	Paris	bronze medal	
Milan International	1906	Milan	gold medal	
Franco-British Exhibition	1908	London	gold medal	
Brussels International	1910	Brussels	honorary degree	
Exposition of Roubaix	1911	Roubaix		
Anglo-Latin Exposition	1912	Chicago	grand prix	
Exposition universelle et internationale	1913	Ghent	grand prix	
Panama–Pacific International Exposition	1915	San Francisco		
Exposition of Strasbourg	1919	Strasbourg		
International Exhibition of Modern Decorative and Industrial Arts	1925	Paris		

== Celebrity customers ==
Goyard's letterhead paper dated 24 June 1891 bore the coats of arms of the United Kingdom and the Russian Empire and the Great Seal of the United States of America. The queens of Yugoslavia and Greece became customers after World War II, whilst the Duke and Duchess of Windsor purchased their first Goyard goods in 1939. High-profile purchasers such as the Grimaldis or the Maharajah of Kapurthala rub shoulders with celebrities, socialites or first ladies like Catherine Deneuve, Édith Piaf, Romy Schneider, Jean-Claude Brialy, who acquired his first Goyard pieces in 1974, Mrs Georges Pompidou, who became a client from 1963 onwards, princess Andrée Aga Khan (1956), princess Radziwill (1949) or the prince and princess von Fürstenberg (1968). Contemporary glitterati like Madonna, Victoria Beckham, Carla Bruni-Sarkozy are regularly spotted wearing Goyard bags. Kanye West mentioned his affinity for Goyard trunks in the 2007 song, The Glory, and Rich the Kid filmed a music video in a Goyard store.

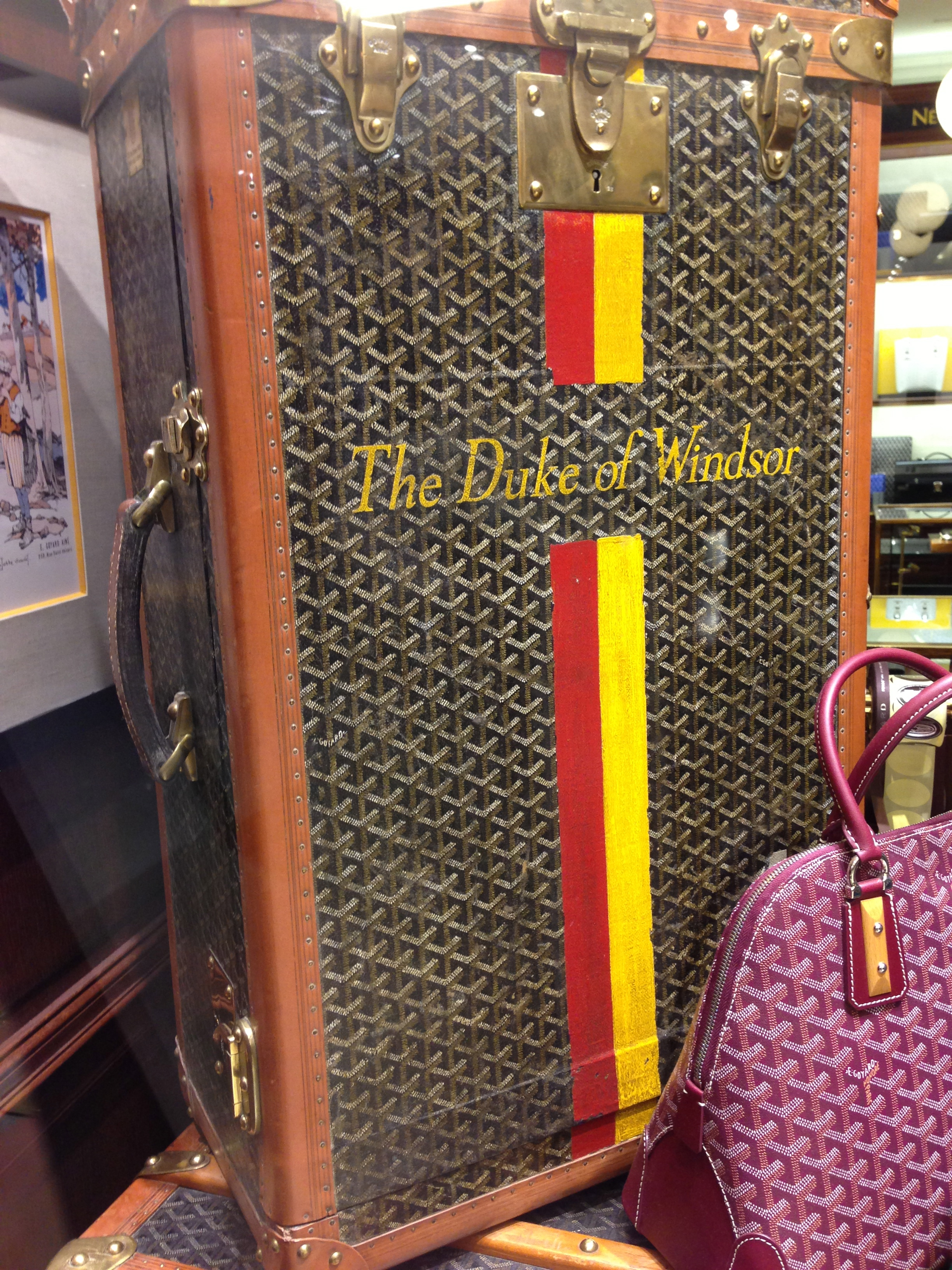
Duke of Windsor trunks

== Manufacturing of the Goyard canvas: the Goyardine ==
The coated cloth debuted for the World Exposition in 1900, and was used in the inter-war years. It remains unchanged in present times, keeping its chevron pattern. In 2002, 110 years after its creation, the Signoles family inaugurated their tenure at the helm of Goyard with the introduction of twelve new colours in addition to the historic black canvas. Currently, the Goyardine canvas is available in black, black-tan, red, orange, yellow, green, sky-blue, navy-blue, burgundy, white and grey.

=== A natural fiber canvas ===
From the beginning, Goyardine was made with cloth; although its appearance is similar to leather. Goyard uses three plant fibers: hemp, linen, and cotton. Hemp is particularly sought after for its hydrophobic qualities, linen is a fine thermal regulator, and the softness of cotton probably caught the attention of the trunk maker.

=== The manufacturing process ===
The initial meters of Goyardine were likely hand-painted. When the Goyardine was launched, the workshops moved to Bezons, and the manufacturing of the canvas required a ground-colour application followed by three successive layers of etching colours. The trademark slightly raised pattern of the Goyardine results from both the cloth and the printing technique used during the manufacturing process: the plain weave shows through the Chevron pattern, and superimposes on top of the raised pattern produced by the paint dots, leaving a unique design that is difficult to counterfeit.

=== Symbolic meaning of the Goyard Chevron pattern ===
The dots on the fabric represent three chevrons juxtaposed to form a Y, the central letter in the Goyard family name. Edmond Goyard used the three chevrons of the letter Y to sign his canvas like a painter would sign their painting: his name written in white is the only element that truly stands out, while the address of the Paris store is spelled in two different shades of brown, and "Paris" is repeated twice, and arranged in a centrally symmetrical stack. Edmond Goyard was the very first trunk maker to build his name into his canvas, and did so even before the year 1900. The piled up dot pattern was clearly inspired by the Goyard family history, and evokes their "Compagnon de rivière"(log drivers) ancestors.

=== Goyard woven canvases ===
If Edmond Goyard left his mark on the history of the brand by creating the Goyardine, his son Robert also created a new fabric: a four-shade-woven canvas. This canvas is used in bags designed for frequent air travel. Robert Goyard patented his new canvas on 24 November 1965, and described its design as "Chevrons intertwined with linear stripes." This new canvas not only allows for a more modern look, for it is a woven canvas, but it is also much softer than the historic Goyard canvas, making it possible to manufacture new products. In order to improve the solidity of the weaving, Robert Goyard altered the pattern in 1968, making it easily recognizable from the previous one (as it is much more even).

=== New Goyard woven canvases ===
In 2010, Goyard debuted a canvas woven on a jacquard loom, marking a technical feat, as it builds "E.Goyard" into a lighter-shaded thread of the canvas, a previously unheard-of achievement in the textile industry. The new canvas is currently available in a black-charcoal grey-dove grey-white colour palette, and will shortly be available in other shades.

=== The Lenglen canvas ===
A rare canvas developed in collaboration with tennis player Suzanne Lenglen in the 1930s; its production stopped when Lenglen died in 1938.

== Special orders ==
Nowadays, special orders are to be placed at the store at 233, rue Saint-Honoré, as it was the case when the factory was located in Bezons. Special orders are entirely hand-made in the Goyard workshops in southern France, in the Aude department. The workshops are installed in converted wine warehouses. Whilst some trunk makers specialize in standardized goods, Goyard is equally at ease with both special orders and ready-made items. Among the many extravagant special orders that Goyard was able to deliver over the course of its history, Sir Arthur Conan Doyle's "Writer’s trunk" certainly stands out. In the report he wrote for the International Exposition of Modern Industrial and Decorative Arts in 1925, Paul Léon lists its main characteristics: "The trunk is equipped with a filing cabinet, a bookcase, a typewriter and a foldable desk." The descriptive text that goes with its patent spares no detail either: "All kinds of kits and sets can be placed in the pigeonhole located in the trunk lid, along with photograph frames, a watch, a thermometer and a barometer". After the death of the creator of Sherlock Holmes on 7 July 1930, Edmond Goyard registered a patent for the trunk on 20 July 1931, and seldom remanufactured this exceptional piece.

Each order is the result of a special encounter: that taking place between the trunk maker and the customer. When it comes to special orders, everything is possible: a trunk especially designed to carry and store caviar, or to meet the needs of a sportsperson, a fabulous picnic trunk.

Each piece of hard-sided luggage by Goyard is entirely hand made by a specific trunk maker, according to the highest, strictest standards. When the crafting process is over, the trunk maker writes down the serial number of the piece they made on its identification tag, along with their initials. They also write down that same serial number in the manufacturing register that has been keeping track of all items made by the Goyard workshops ever since Jean-Michel Signoles took over. The manufacturing register is used as a reference in the event an item needs to be repaired. About twenty trunk makers work in the Goyard workshops and specialize in made-to-order trunks and hard-sided luggage.

== Luggage monogramming and crowns ==
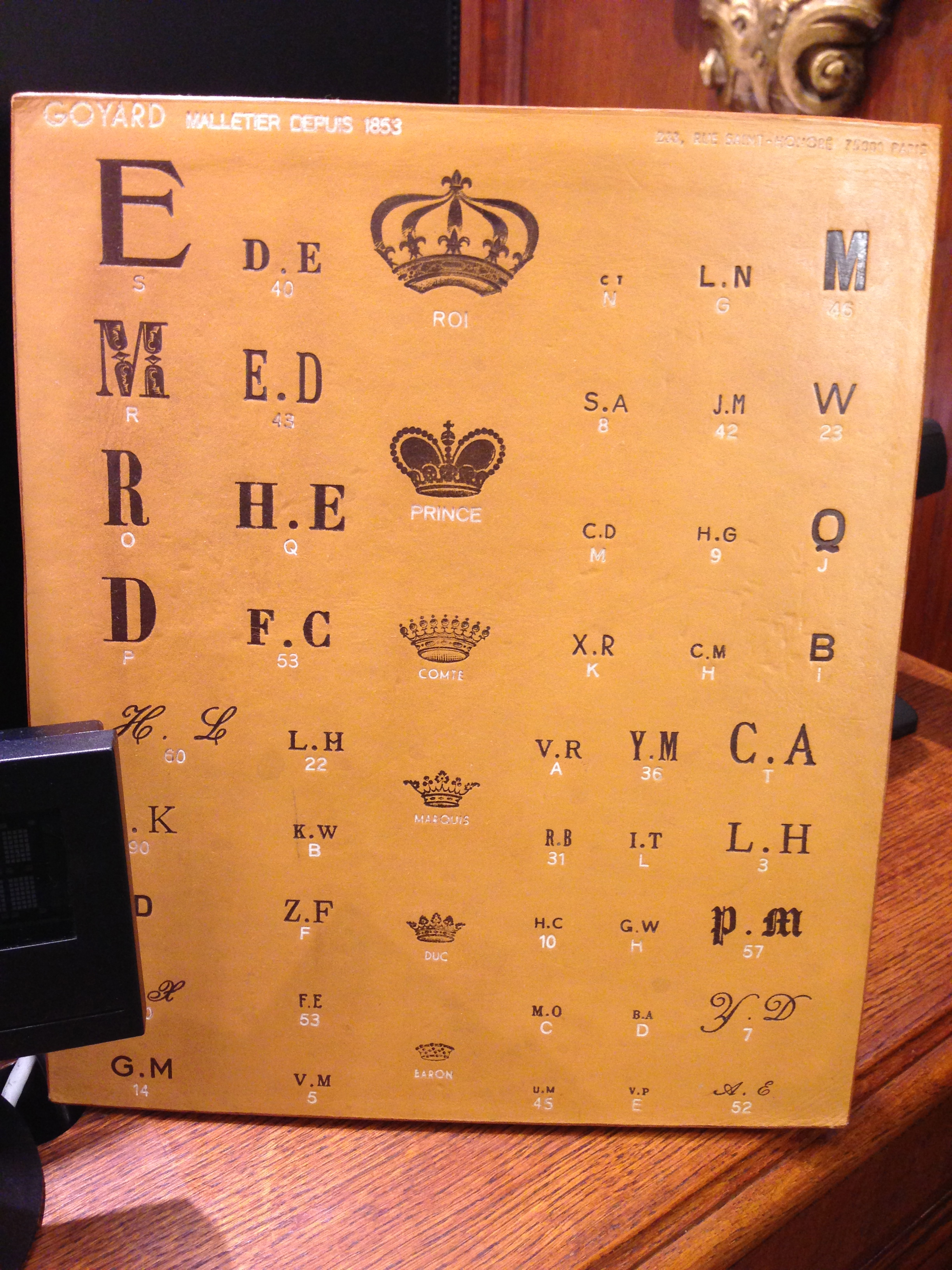
Goyard crowns and fonts

When several members of a same family travel together, their luggage stripes are identical, and it is difficult to tell which piece of luggage belongs to whom. In France, tradition dictates that each piece should be monogrammed with the initials of its owner, whereas in the UK, it is customary to use the owner's full first and last names, whether they are a royal or a commoner. Initials have been used for a long time, as evidenced by the wooden trunk the compagnons de rivière used to carry along with them on their timber raft. It was the only valuable object on board, and it was used to protect food and personal belongings from the waters of the river. Over the course of time, it became a token of remembrance, reminding its owner of the many travels he made. It was monogrammed with its owner's initials and also stamped with the employers' logo. François Goyard's grandfather was a compagnon de rivière, and he owned a monogrammed trunk long before the family went into the trunk making business. Stripes perpetuate old traditions, notably those related to horse carriages, which were painted in the colours of each family.

Goyard's monograms are hand-painted onto the Goyardine canvas and can be customized with a variety of different colours. The revival of customized leather goods, whether they are adorned with initials, stripes or coats of arms, proved Goyard's answer to the logo craze.

== Goyard boutiques ==
Apart from the main boutique in Paris, Goyard also has freestanding monobrand stores in:

- Monaco, 17-19 Avenue de Monte-Carlo
- New York City, 20 East 63rd Street at Madison Avenue, and Bergdorf Goodman
- Dallas, TX Highland Park Village
- London, 116 Mount Street
- Milan, 18 angolo Via Gesù
- San Francisco, 118 Grant Avenue
- Biarritz, 4 Avenue de l’Impératrice
- Mexico City, 420 Avenida Presidente Masaryk
- Beverly Hills, 405 N Rodeo Drive
- Tokyo at Isetan Shinjuku, Takashimaya in Nihombashi; Takashimaya in Kyoto and Nagoya, Osaka at Umeda Hankyu
- Seoul at Galleria Department Store; Coex and Shinsegae Gangnam
- Busan at BUSAN CENTUM CITY
- Chicago at 737 North Michigan Avenue
- Shanghai at Plaza 66 and Shanghai IFC
- Beijing at China World Mall
- Nanjing at Deji Plaza
- Chengdu at Chengdu IFS
- Shenzhen at Shenzhen Bay MixC
- Hong Kong at Peninsula Hotel and Pacific Place
- São Paulo at JK Iguatemi Shopping Mall
- Singapore at Takashimaya
- Bal Harbour Shops in Bal Harbour Florida

In 2008, Goyard opened a boutique called "Le Chic du Chien" (Canine Chic) entirely dedicated to pet accessories and excursion items at 352, rue Saint-Honoré, right across the street from its historic store at 233, rue Saint-Honoré. Edmond Goyard was very keen on developing a range of pet accessories, as evidenced by catalogues and invoices dating from as far back as 1890. The Goyard range for pets comprised items for dogs, cats and even monkeys. Edmond Goyard hired the most sought-after illustrators of his time, such as the likes of Benjamin Rabier and Pierre Falize, the latter being also the creator of famous posters for iconic Parisian Restaurant Prunier, to work on the Chic du Chien commercial catalogues.

== Charitable work ==
=== Sidaction and Avec ===
Ever since it started in 1994, Goyard has been a supporter of Sidaction, a major French public event for raising awareness and collecting charitable funds for AIDS. Goyard donates prestigious prizes for the annual Fashion Dinner's raffle, in order to fund initiatives against AIDS, whether research programs, patient assistance or prevention schemes. Goyard is also a supporter of the annual AVEC (Association pour la Vie, Espoir contre le Cancer, a nonprofit organization fighting cancer) evening. At the end of the charity dinner organized at the Palace of Versailles in January 2012, "the auction was equally fun and lucrative: the Goyard prize (a hard-sided suitcase worth 4700 euros) was auctioned three times and finally repurchased by the very man who had donated it in the first place, Jean-Michel Signoles, president of Goyard, who ended up offering it to French TV show host Stéphane Bern."

=== Un bagage pour la vie, un bagage pour Curie ===
For the third edition of Un bagage pour la vie, un bagage pour Curie, Goyard organized an auction of customized bags and luggage to raise money for the leading cancer research centre Institut Curie in Paris. The patron of the event was Amélie Mauresmo, and the pieces auctioned off were sponsored by twenty-one female personalities from the worlds of cinema, fashion and sport: Sarah Biasini, Élodie Bouchez, Cécile Cassel, Audrey Dana, Emma de Caunes, Catherine Deneuve, Zoé Felix, Charlotte Gainsbourg, Vahina Giocante, Judith Godrèche, Audrey Marnay, Chiara Mastroianni, Amélie Mauresmo, Mathilda May, Héléna Noguerra, Géraldine Pailhas, Vanessa Paradis, Linh-Dan Pham, Barbara Schultz, Audrey Tautou, and Elsa Zylberstein. Each personality was invited by Goyard to use the iconic chevron pattern canvas to express their own vision of travelling: stripes of colour, messages or drawings. Their imagination combined to Goyard's know-how resulted in twenty-one unique pieces auctioned at Christie's in Paris.

== The Goyard art book ==
The Goyard art book published by Devambez is the reference publication upon Parisian trunk makers. It was dubbed "a luxury bible" by Suzy Menkes in the article called "A tender Tome of Art and Heart" that she wrote in the New York Times on 15 June 2010. The book had a print run of 233 copies, a reference to the address of the Goyard historic store that has been located at 233, rue Saint Honoré since 1834. It will never be republished and is visible by appointment only in the Goyard Paris shop.

The Goyard art book pays tribute to the golden days of luxury travelling, from horse carriage to ocean liners. It retraces the history of Goyard and is showcased in a special made-to-order trunk that is altogether a jewel case and a book's binding (sewing). Each individual purchaser is invited to make their named copy into a unique piece by picking the colour for the trunk canvas, which can also be initialled or adorned with stripes in the shades of their choice. Copies are numbered from 1 to 233, and that number is specified both on the trunk and in the book. The Goyard art book is printed on watermarked deckled vellum paper that was custom-made by Arches, France's most renowned papermakers. Lead letterpress techniques have been used for the texts. The Goyard art book is featured in the collections of the National Library of France, the Bibliothèque des Arts Décoratifs in Paris and the Kunstbibliothek in Berlin.
