= Rue Saint-Honoré =

Street in Paris, France

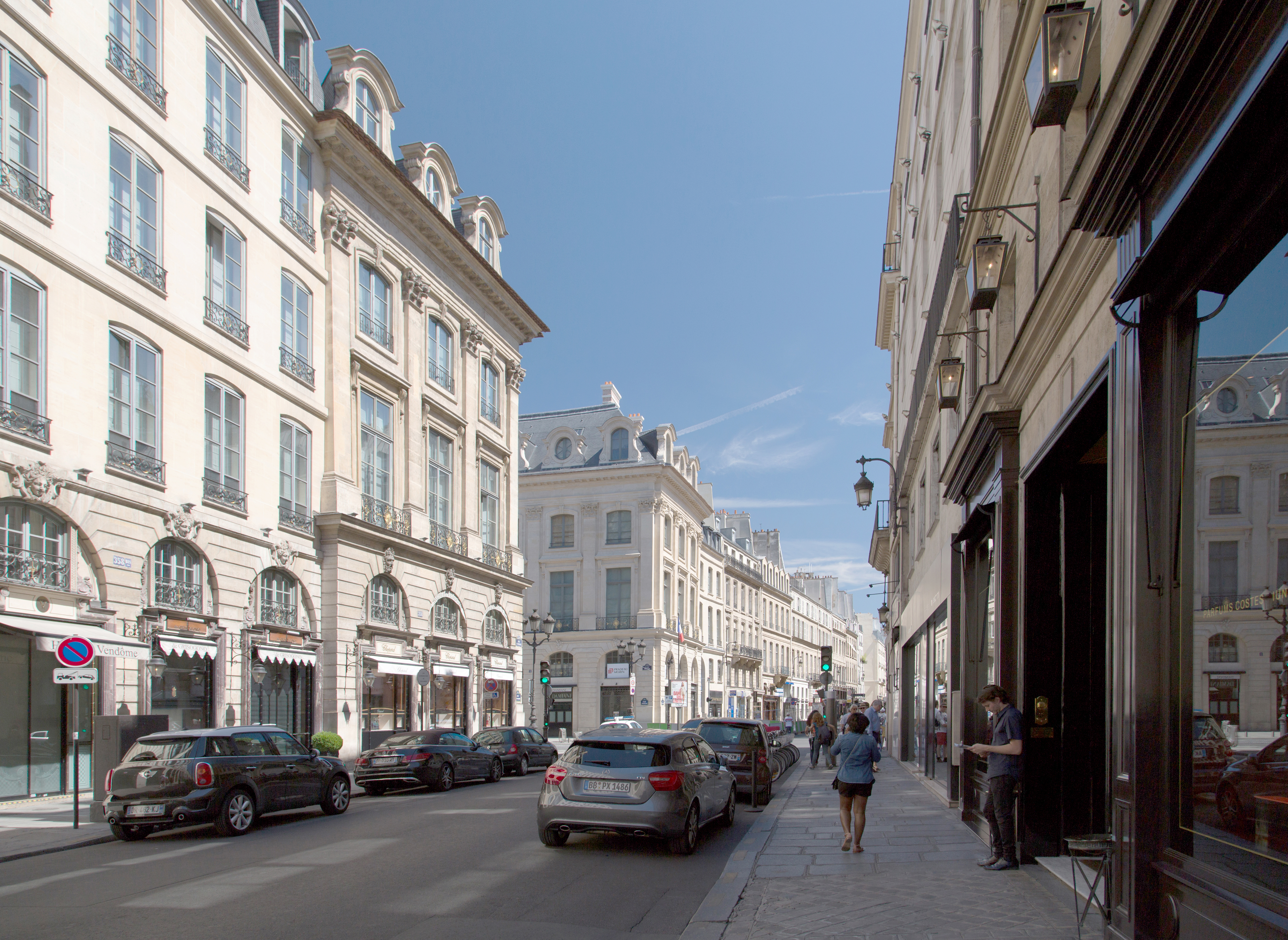
- Rue Saint-Honoré, Paris

- Location within Paris
- Length: 1,840 m (6,040 ft)
- Width: 20 m (66 ft) 17.50m 14.60m
- Arrondissement: 1st, 8th
- Quarter: Les Halles. Palais Royale. Place Vendôme.
- Coordinates: 48°51′53″N 2°19′56″E
- From: 21 rue des Halles
- To: 14 rue Royale

Construction
- Denomination: December 10, 1847

The Rue Saint-Honoré (French pronunciation: [ʁy sɛ̃t‿ɔnɔʁe]) is a street in the 1st arrondissement of Paris, France. It is named after the collegial Saint-Honoré church, situated in ancient times within the cloisters of Saint-Honoré, itself named for Saint Honoré, or Honoratus (d. 600 AD), Bishop of Amiens.

The street, on which are located a number of museums and upscale boutiques, is near the Tuileries Gardens and the Saint-Honoré market. Like many streets in the heart of Paris, the Rue Saint-Honoré, as it is now known, was laid out as early as the Middle Ages or before.

The street, at one time, continued beyond the former city walls into what was the faubourg (from Latin foris burgem, an area "outside the city"). This continuation was eventually named the Rue du Faubourg Saint-Honoré.

== History ==
The Rue Saint-Honoré has been given the following names in its long history:

- The section between the Rue de la Lingerie and the Rue de la Tonnellerie was named the Rue de la Chausseterie from 1300 to the 17th century.
- The section between the now extinct Rue Tirechappe and the Rue de l'Arbre Sec was named the Rue du Chastiau Festu (1300) or du Château Fêtu.
- The section between the Rue de l'Arbre Sec and the now defunct Rue du Rempart was named the Rue de la Croix du Trahoir, Rue de la Croix du Tiroir or Rue du Traihoir (also spelled du Traihouer, du Trayoir, du Trahoir, du Triouer, or du Trioir) between the 13th and 14th centuries; and the Rue de la chaussée Saint-Honoré from 1450.
- The section between the now extinct Rue du Rempart and the Rue Royale was known successively as the Chemin de Clichy (1204), Grand chemin Saint-Honoré (1283), Chaussée Saint-Honoré (1370), Grand chemin de la Porte Saint-Honoré (1392), Chemin Royal (1393), Nouvelle rue Saint-Louis (1407), Grand rue Saint-Louis (1421), Rue Neuve-Saint-Louis (1430), Grande rue du Faubourg Saint-Honoré (1609), Chaussée Saint-Honoré (1634), and Rue Neuve-Saint-Honoré (1638)
- In 1966, the part between the Palais-Royal, Comédie-Française, and Place André Malraux was given the name Place Colette.

=== Notable landmarks ===
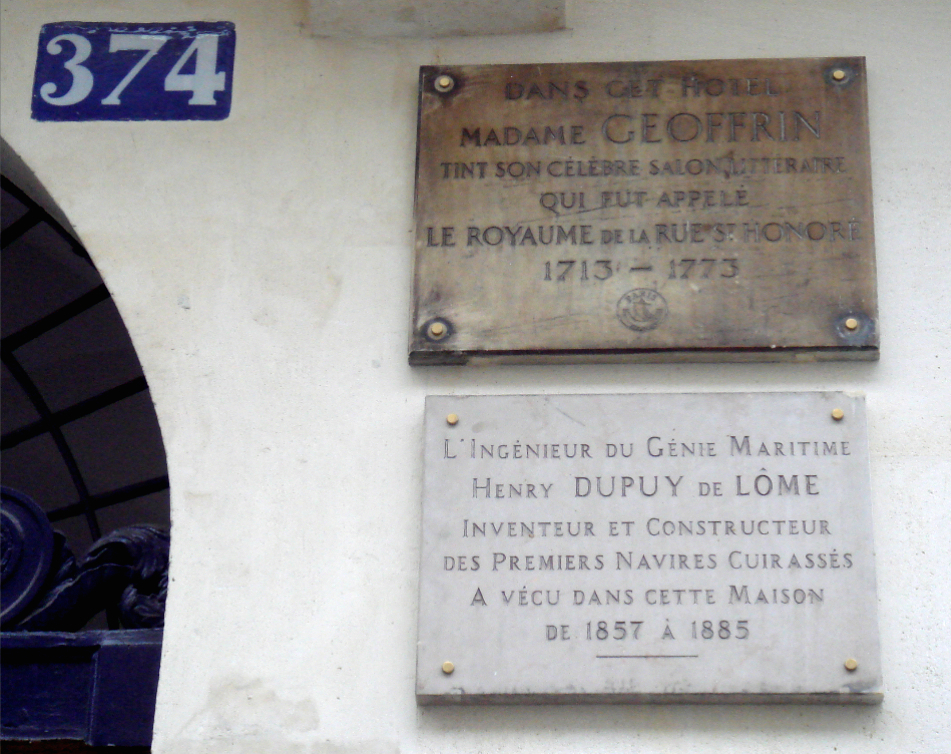
Henri Dupuy de Lôme lived 374 rue Saint-Honoré from 1857 until his death in 1885.

- In 1631, the old Porte Saint-Honoré, across from the Rue de Richelieu, was torn down and replaced, facing the Rue Royale.
- In 1670, the northern fortifications of Paris were demolished and the street was called the Boulevard Saint-Honoré, traversing from the Rue Saint-Antoine to the Rue Saint-Martin.
- No. 9: 14 May 1610, King Henry IV of France was assassinated by Catholic zealot François Ravaillac.
- No. 92: 15 January 1622, the playwright known as Molière was born.
- No. 129 was where Louis Gaston Hebert, one of the founding pioneers of Canada, was born and lived prior to his journey with his wife and three children to New France in 1620.
- No. 145: The Oratoire du Louvre Protestant church.
- Nos. 146, 148, and 150: The remains of King Philip II are entombed.

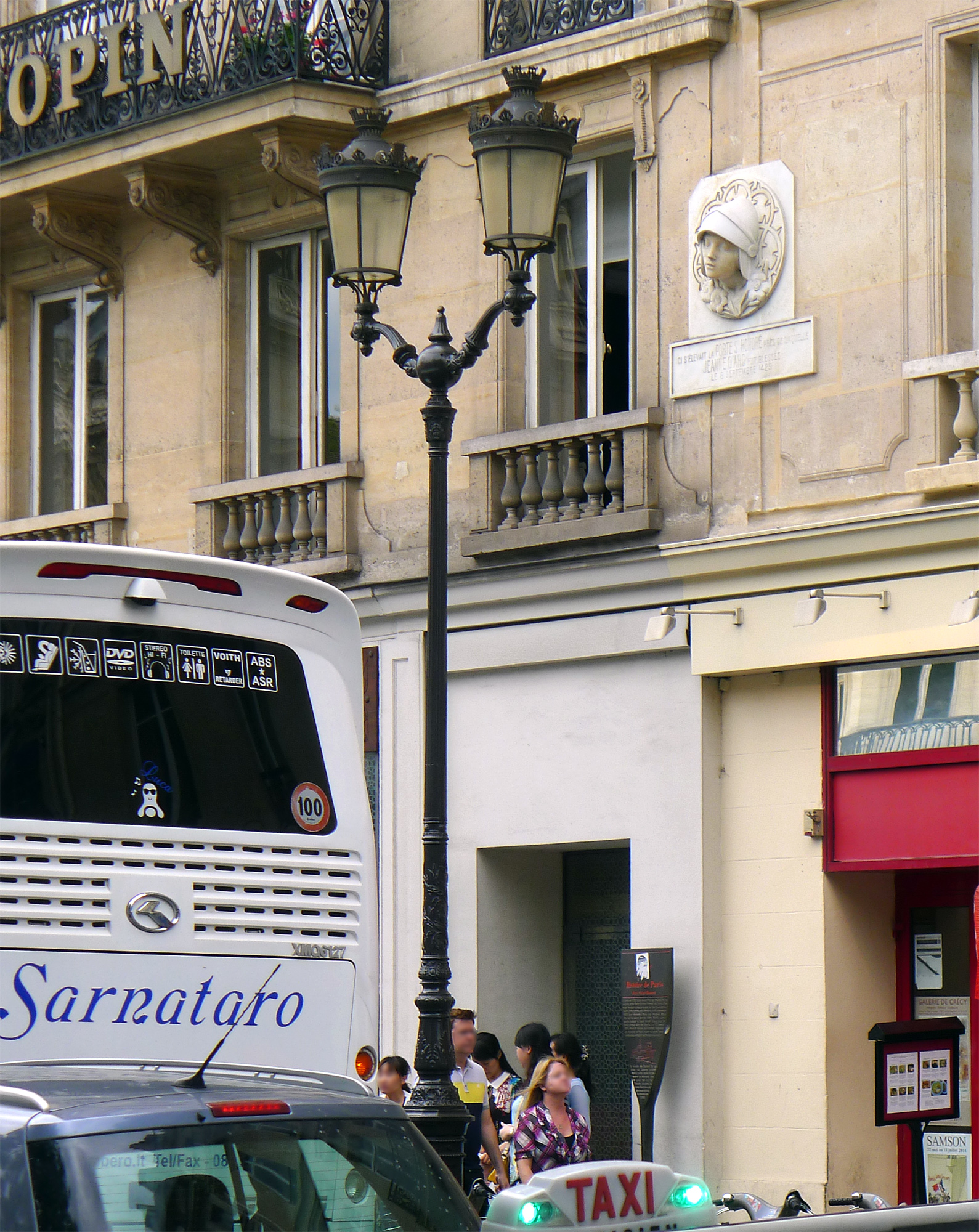
Nos. 161-163

- Nos. 161, 163: On 8 September 1429, Joan of Arc was wounded at the Porte Saint-Honoré (Saint-Honoré Gate) in her unsuccessful attack on Paris, at the time when it was held by the English.
- No. 182: The Immeuble des Bons-Enfants, arm of the French Ministry of Culture was built between 2000 and 2004. The façade facing the street, later clad with an ornamental metallic net ("résille"), is the work of Léon Vaudoyer. Executing architects were Francis Soler and Frédéric Druot.
- No. 204: The Palais-Royal (originally the Palais-Richelieu), built in 1629 by Cardinal Richelieu, is now also the seat of the Comédie-Française
- No. 211: The former Hôtel de Noailles, later Bertin, built in 1715 by Pierre Cailleteau dit Lassurance on the site of the former Hôtel Pussort, of which some parts still exist, surrounded by buildings of the Hôtel Saint-James et Albany.
- Between nos. 229 and 235 : Former Couvent des Feuillants or Les Feuillants Convent where gathered the right-wing dissidents from the "Society of Friends of the Constitution", supporters of a Constitutional Monarchy, including La Fayette, Barnave, Alexandre-Théodore-Victor, comte de Lameth and Théodore de Lameth. Louis XVI, Marie-Antoinette and their family were imprisoned there during three days after the Insurrection of 10 August. Later, banker Claude Perier fitted out his town house in the estate.
- No. 239: Hôtel Costes
- No. 251: Nouveau Cirque, from 1886 to 1936.
- Nos. 263 and 265: Église Notre-Dame-de-l'Assomption de Paris
- No. 273: During the French Revolution, Sieyès lived at this address.
- No. 284: Église Saint-Roch

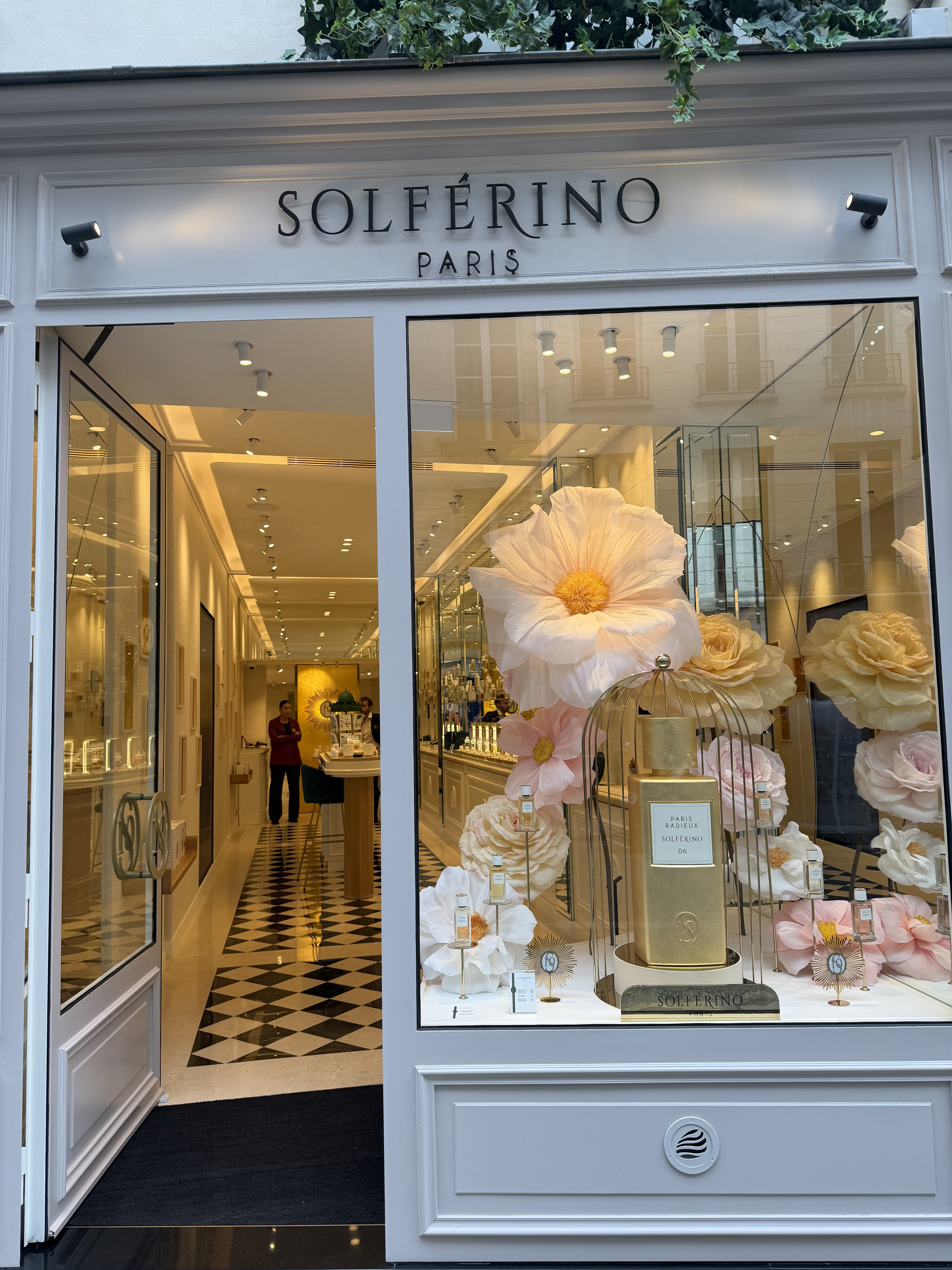
No. 310

- No. 310: Perfum shop « Solférino Paris ».
- No. 314: last residence of the Spanish composer Juan Chrisostomo Arriaga y Balzola (1806-1826)
- No. 398: Maximilien de Robespierre was sheltered by Maurice Duplay. The cart which took Robespierre to the guillotine on the Place de la Concorde on 28 July 1794 made a stop in front of this house.

== Bibliography ==
- Bernard Stéphane and Franz-Olivier Giesbert. Petite et Grande Histoire des rues de Paris. Paris: Albin Michel, 2000. ISBN 2-226-10879-3. ISBN 978-2-226-10879-1
- Bernard-Claude Galey. Origines surprenantes des noms de villages, des noms des rues de Paris et de villes de province. Paris: Le Cherche Midi, 2004. ISBN 2-7491-0192-1. ISBN 978-2-7491-0192-7.
- Anne Thorval. Promenades sur les lieux de l'histoire: D'Henri IV à Mai 68, les rues de Paris racontent l'histoire de France. Paris: Paragamme, 2004. ISBN 2-84096-323-X. ISBN 978-2-84096-323-3.
