= Baggage sizer =

Device to measure hand baggage

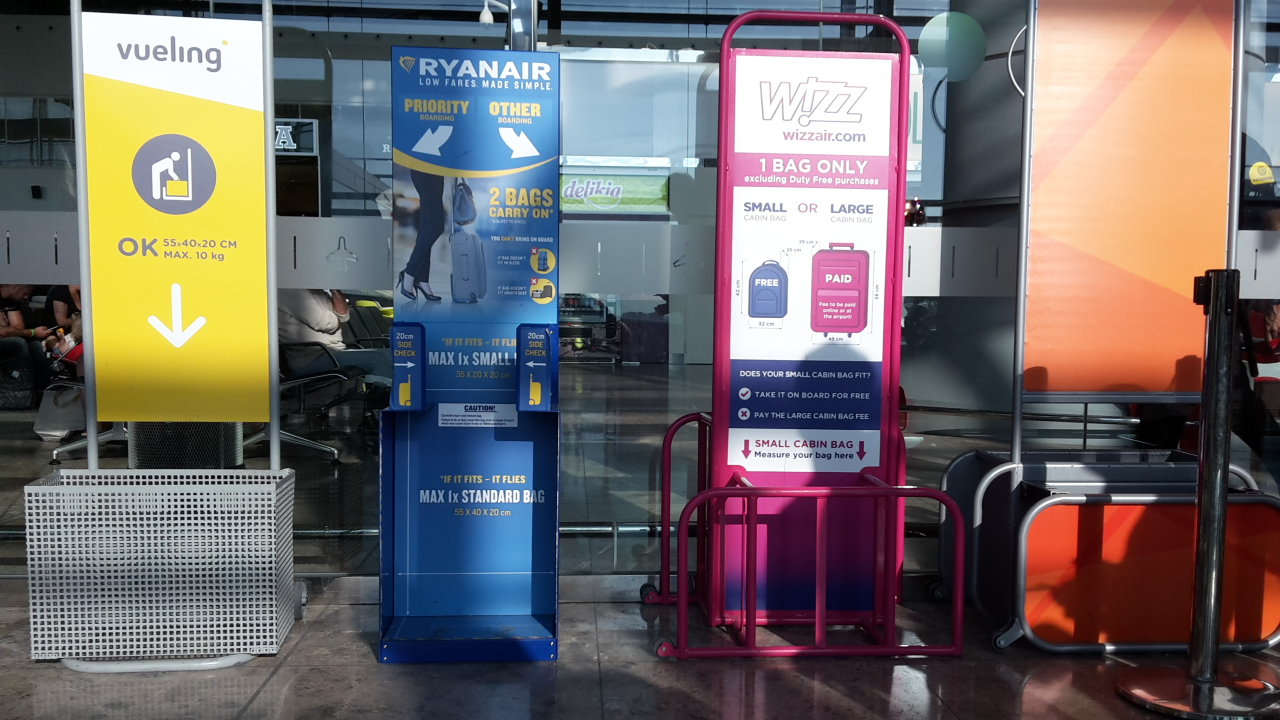
A series of baggage sizers at Alicante airport.

A baggage sizer, also known as a bag sizer, is a piece of furniture that is used primarily at airport check-in desks and boarding gates to assist and inform passengers and airport ground staff of baggage size limits for personal and cabin luggage or bags.

It usually consists of a tubular metal or hard plastic frame with one or two holes in which bags are placed to see whether it fits the baggage size limit as demanded by the airline. Some sizers are built with built-in luggage scales, which indicates whether the bag is heavier than the maximum weight limit. It can also be a cardboard or wooden device which shows the maximum size for the luggage.

As well as airports, they also exist in certain railway stations as a number of operators like Amtrak, VIA Rail, JR Central and Ouigo have personal hand baggage allowances.
