= Tom Bihn =

American luggage manufacturer

- Company type: Corporation
- Founded: Santa Cruz, California, USA 1982
- Founder: Tom Bihn
- Headquarters: Seattle, Washington, USA
- Key people: Cindy Guan (CEO); Darcy (advisor); Nik (advisor)
- Products: Baggage, Briefcases, Backpacks, Duffel bags, Laptop bags, Packing cubes, Tote bags, Masks
- Website: tombihn.com

Tom Bihn Inc. is an American baggage manufacturer, with products ranging from backpacks to travel accessories. It was founded in Santa Cruz, California in 1982 by Tom Bihn. Bihn had been designing and making bags since 1972. The company's headquarters and factory are in Seattle, Washington. The logo of the company includes a Farman F.121 Jabiru aircraft.

== Products ==
- Travel accessories and small bags
- Backpacks
- Laptop bags
- Totes
- Travel bags
- Masks

== President message ==
In 2017 the company received attention on social media and in news reports for a message printed on its washing instructions tag which read: "NOUS SOMMES DESOLES QUE NOTRE PRESIDENT SOIT UN IDIOT" – We're sorry that our president is an idiot – "NOUS N'AVONS PAS VOTE POUR LUI" – We didn’t vote for him. At the time the message was rumored to refer to president Donald Trump, however, it was found that the tag had been printed in 2004 when George W. Bush held the office. At that time, Tom Bihn told The Ottawa Citizen that the "president" in question was him, the president of the company, but added that he was not opposed to that sentiment about Bush. The tag gained further worldwide attention in the same year where it was believed in France that it referred to then French president Jacques Chirac. The Florida Times-Union reported on the story again when interest was renewed during the Barack Obama administration.
