= Baggage =

Traveler's accoutrements container

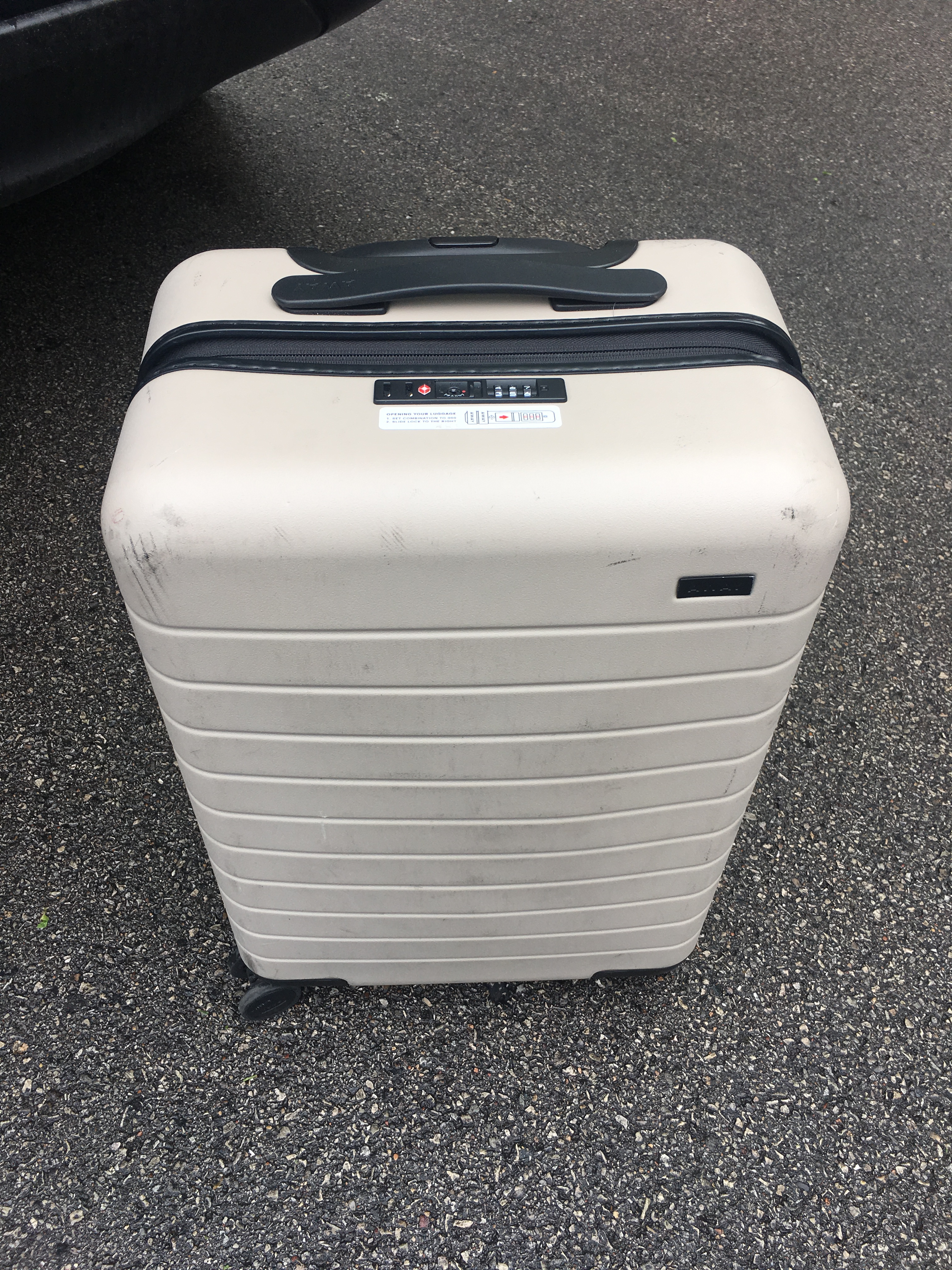
A typical suitcase used for traveling

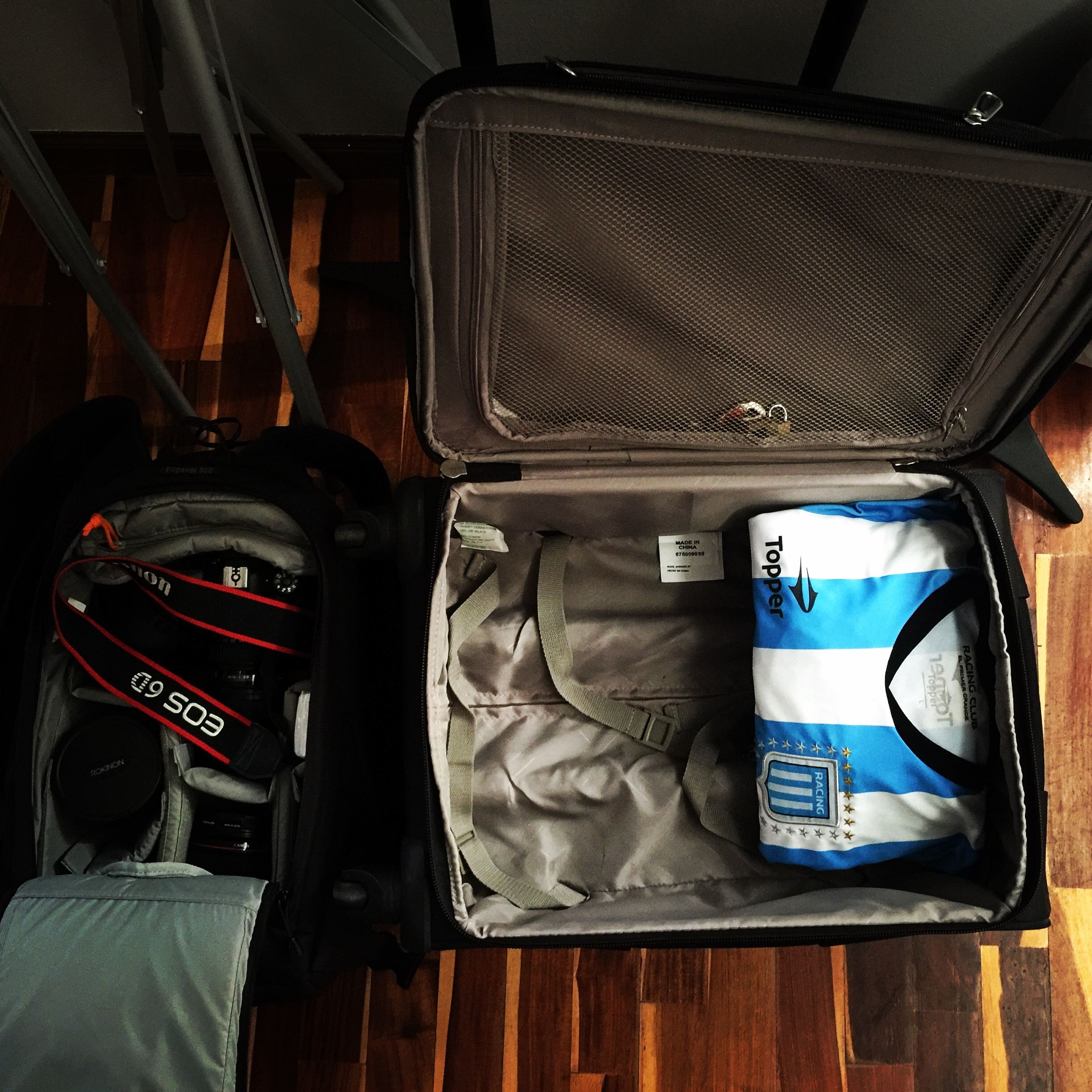
Interior of a typical luggage suitcase

Baggage, or luggage, consists of bags, cases, and containers which hold a traveler's personal articles while the traveler is in transit. A modern traveler can be expected to have packages containing clothing, toiletries, small possessions, and trip necessities. On the return trip, travelers may have souvenirs and gifts. For some people, baggage and the style thereof is representative of the owner's wealth and status.

Baggage is constructed to protect the items during travel either with a hard shell or a durable soft material. Baggage often has internal subdivisions or sections to aid in securing items. Handles are typically provided to facilitate carrying, and some baggage may have wheels and/or telescoping handles or leashes to make moving them easier. Baggage (not luggage), or baggage train, can also refer to the train of people and goods, both military and of a personal nature, which commonly followed pre-modern armies on campaign.

== Overview ==
Luggage has changed over time. Historically the most common types of luggage were chests or trunks made of wood or other heavy materials. These would be shipped by professional movers. Since the Second World War smaller and more lightweight suitcases and bags that can be carried by an individual have become the main form of luggage.

== Etymology ==
According to the Oxford English Dictionary, the word baggage comes from the Old French bagage (from baguer 'tie up') or from bagues 'bundles'. It may also be related to the word bag.

Also according to the Oxford English Dictionary, the word luggage originally meant inconveniently heavy baggage and comes from the verb lug and the suffix -age.

== Types ==
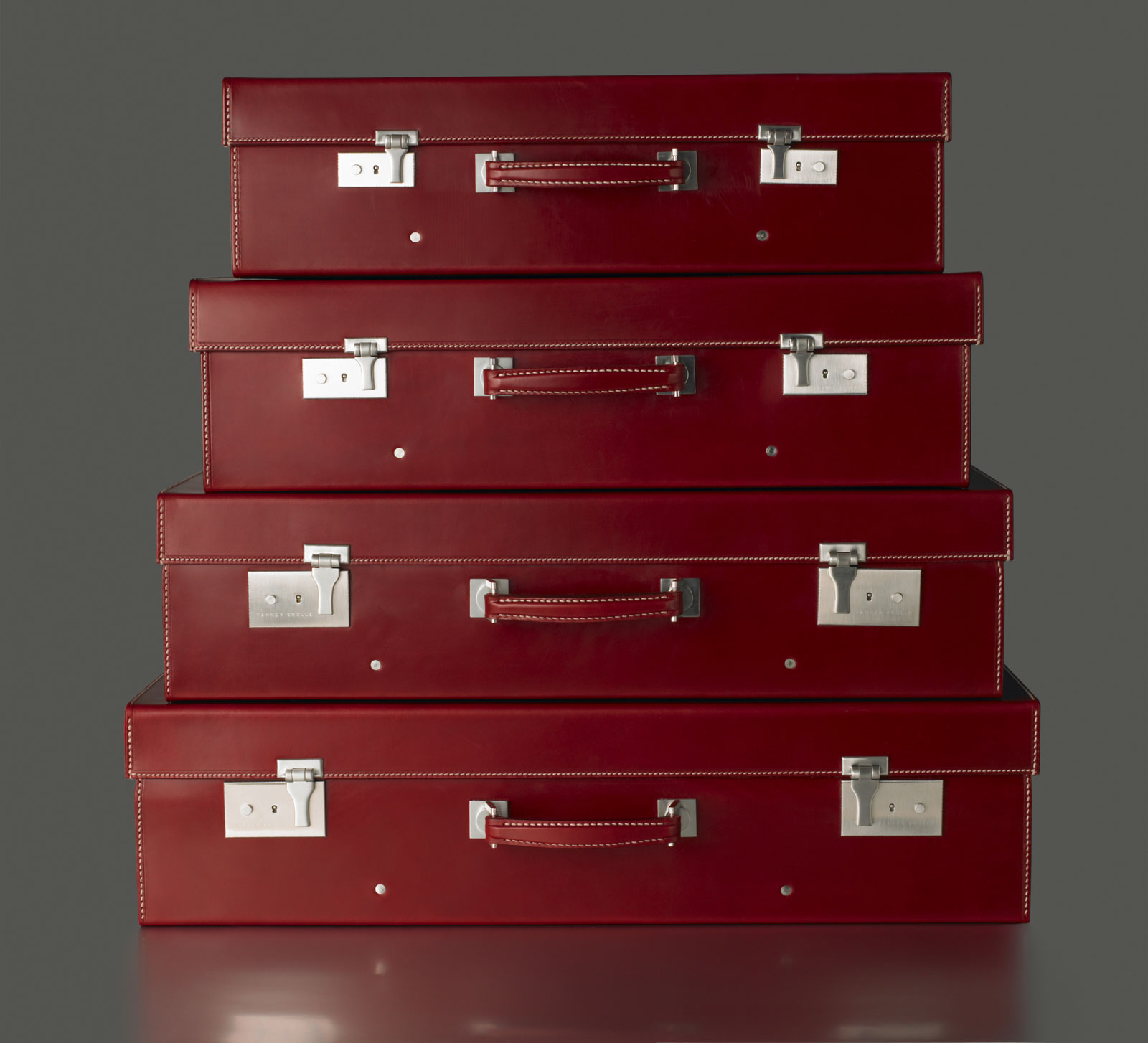
A set of custom made (bespoke) suitcases

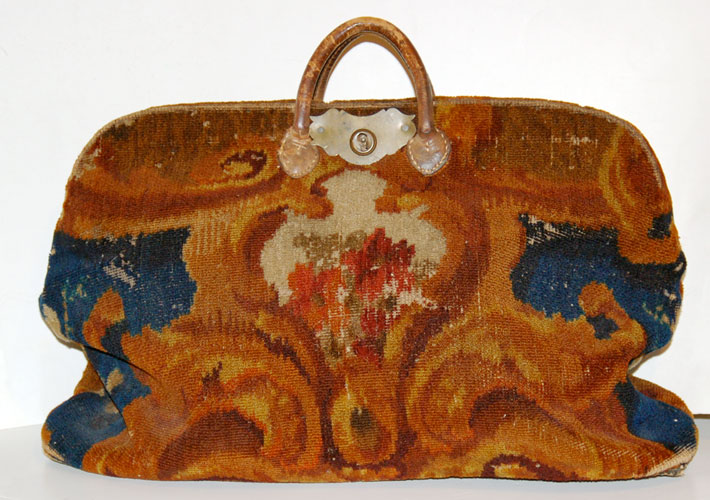
Carpet bag

- Trunk - A wooden box, generally much larger than other kinds of luggage. Trunks come in smaller sizes as in the case of footlockers and larger ones called steamers. These days trunks are more commonly used for storage than transportation. Items large enough to require a trunk are now usually shipped in transport cases. Some of the better known trunk makers are Louis Vuitton, Goyard, Moynat, M. M. Secor and Leatheroid. In the late 1600’s trunks were constructed in America. These trunks were assembled out of different kinds of wood and often covered with animal hides from horses, cows and deer. American made hide covered trunks grew in popularity in the 1700’s and started to become more adorned to enhance the appearance. This included adding leather trim, iron locks, brass tacks as well as handles to the trunks.
- Suitcase - A wheeled or non-wheeled luggage, as well as soft or hard side luggage.
- Train case - A smaller, box-like, handled case for personal grooming articles.
- Garment bag - A style of luggage that folds over on itself to allow long garments such as suits or dresses to be packed flat to avoid creasing. Garment bags come in both wheeled and non-wheeled models and are usually one of the largest pieces in any set of luggage
- Tote - A small bag, usually worn on the shoulder
- Duffle bag - A barrel-shaped bag, almost exclusively soft side, is well suited to casual travel, with little organization inside.
- Carpet bag - Travel luggage traditionally made from carpets.
- Packing cubes - Small rectangular bags of different sizes and different colors created to keep the contents of other baggage organized and compact
- Gate check bags - Bags specially designed to protect frequent gate checking items, such as strollers and car seats.

== Features ==
- Locks - locks serve multiple purposes; a deterrent to dishonest airport workers and locks also help keep baggage closed during handling. Since 2003 most locks integrated into luggage use the TSA Lock standard developed by Travel Sentry to allow opening by the US Transportation Security Administration.
- Expandable luggage - suitcases that can be unzipped to expand for more packing space.

=== Wheels ===
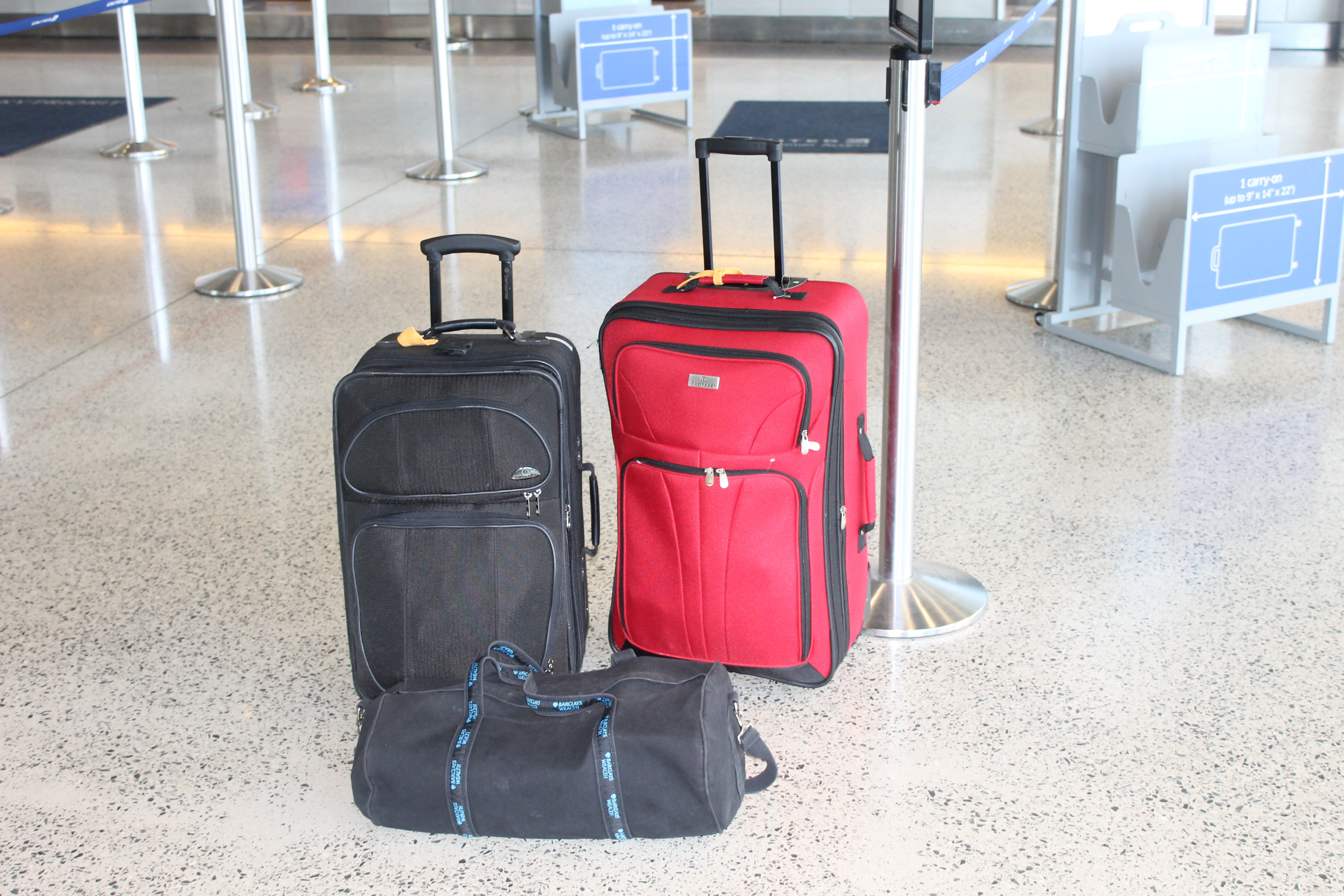
Wheeled suitcases and a duffel bag awaiting loading at airport

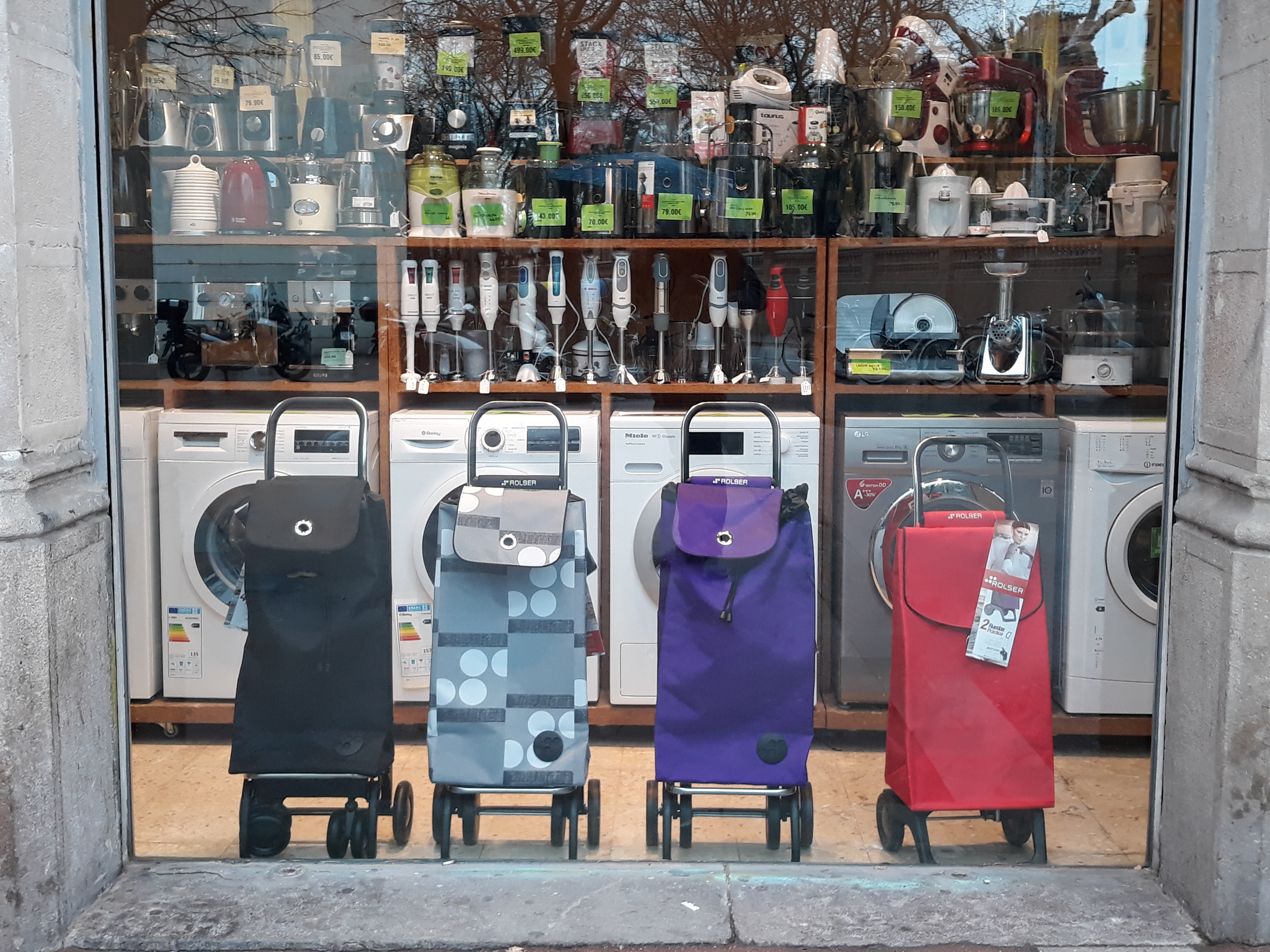
Shopping trolley (caddy)

Luggage carriers – light-weight wheeled carts on which luggage could be temporarily placed or that can be temporarily attached to luggage – date at least to the 1930s, such as in US patent 2,132,316 "Luggage carrier" by Anne W. Newton (filed 1937, published 1938). These were refined over the following decades, as reflected in patents such as a 1948 US patent by Herbert Ernest Mingo, for a "device for the handling of trunks, suitcases, and the like".

A US patent for a "luggage carriage" filed in 1949 (and published 1953), and another for a "luggage carriage harness", were both made by Kent R. Costikyan. However, the wheels were external to the suitcases. Patents had been published for wheeled luggage – a wheeled trunk in 1887, and a wheeled suitcase in 1945 – but these were not successfully commercialized.

The first rolling suitcase was invented by a French engineer, Maurice Partiot, who was living in the USA at that time. The patent was registered n° 2 463 713, March 8, 1949. But the application was not pursued by its inventor and the patent lapsed in 1967. Bernard D. Sadow developed the first commercial rolling suitcase by applying for the rolling luggage patent, which was officially known as; United States patent 3,653,474 for "Rolling Luggage", in 1970. Two years later in 1972 Bernard D. Sadow was given the wheeled suitcases patent, which became successful. The patent application cited the increase in air travel, and "baggage handling [having] become perhaps the single biggest difficulty encountered by an air passenger", as background of the invention.

Sadow's four-wheeled suitcases, pulled using a loose strap, were later surpassed in popularity by suitcases that feature two wheels and are pulled in an upright position using a long handle. These were invented in 1987 by US pilot Robert Plath, and initially sold to crew members. Plath later commercialized them, after travelers became interested after seeing them in use by crew members, and founded the Travelpro company, which marketing the suitcases under the trademark "Rollaboard". The terms rollaboard and roll-aboard are used generically, however. While initially designed for carry-on use (to navigate through a large terminal), as implied by the analogous name, similar designs are also used for checked baggage.

More recently, four-wheeled luggage with casters has become popular, notably since their use by Samsonite in the 2004 version of their signature Silhouette line. These are otherwise similar in design to two-wheel roll-aboards, with a vertical orientation and a retracting handle, but are designed to be pushed beside or in front of the traveler, rather than pulled behind them. These are often referred to as "spinner" luggage, since they can spin about their vertical axis.

Sadow attributes the late invention of luggage on wheels to a "macho thing" where "men would not accept suitcases with wheels". Others attribute the late invention to "the abundance of luggage porters with carts in the 1960s, the ease of curbside drop-offs at much smaller airports and the heavy iron casters then available."

== Hand/carry-on ==
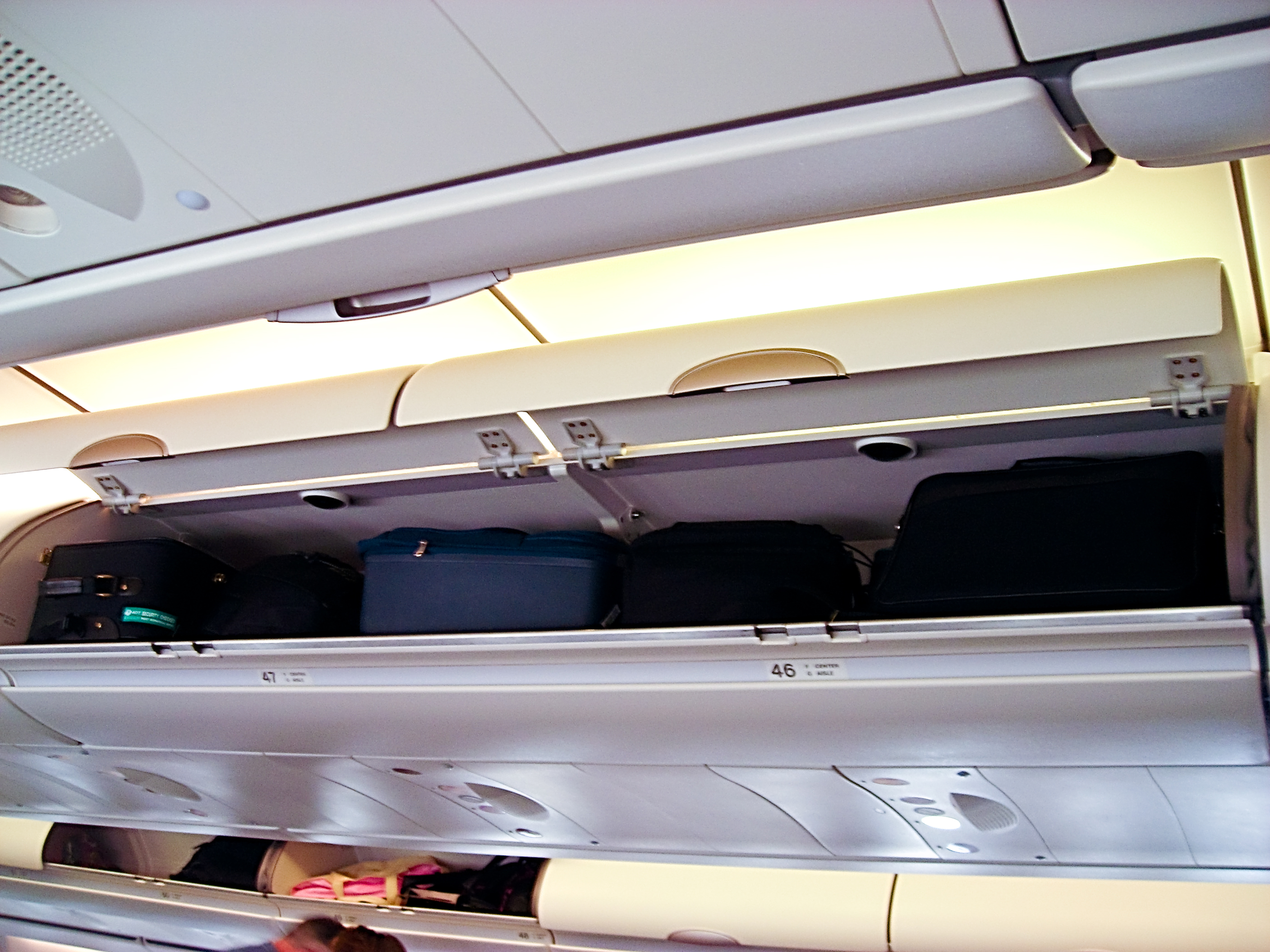
Hand luggage compartments of an Airbus A340-600 aircraft (economy class)

Passengers are allowed to carry a limited number of smaller bags with them in the vehicle, these are known as luggage (more commonly referred to as carry-on in North America), and contain valuables and items needed during the journey. There is normally storage space provided for hand luggage, either under seating, or in overhead lockers. Trains often have luggage racks at the ends of the carriage near the doors, or above the seats if there are compartments. On aircraft, the size and weight of hand luggage is regulated, along with the number of bags. Some airlines charge for carry-on over a certain number.

== Smart ==
Smart luggage is baggage that has a built-in or a removable battery within. It often includes features designed to help with travel, including GPS tracking and USB ports to charge electronics. Some bags include a WiFi hotspot and electric wheels for personal transportation.

Several smart luggage companies have shut down as a result of a ban which came into effect in January 2018 on smart luggage with non-removable batteries being carried as check-in luggage on flights.

== Claim and reclaim ==
In airport terminals, a baggage claim or reclaim area is an area where arriving passengers claim checked-in baggage after disembarking from an airline flight. At most airports and many train stations, baggage is delivered to the passenger on a baggage carousel.

== Storage ==
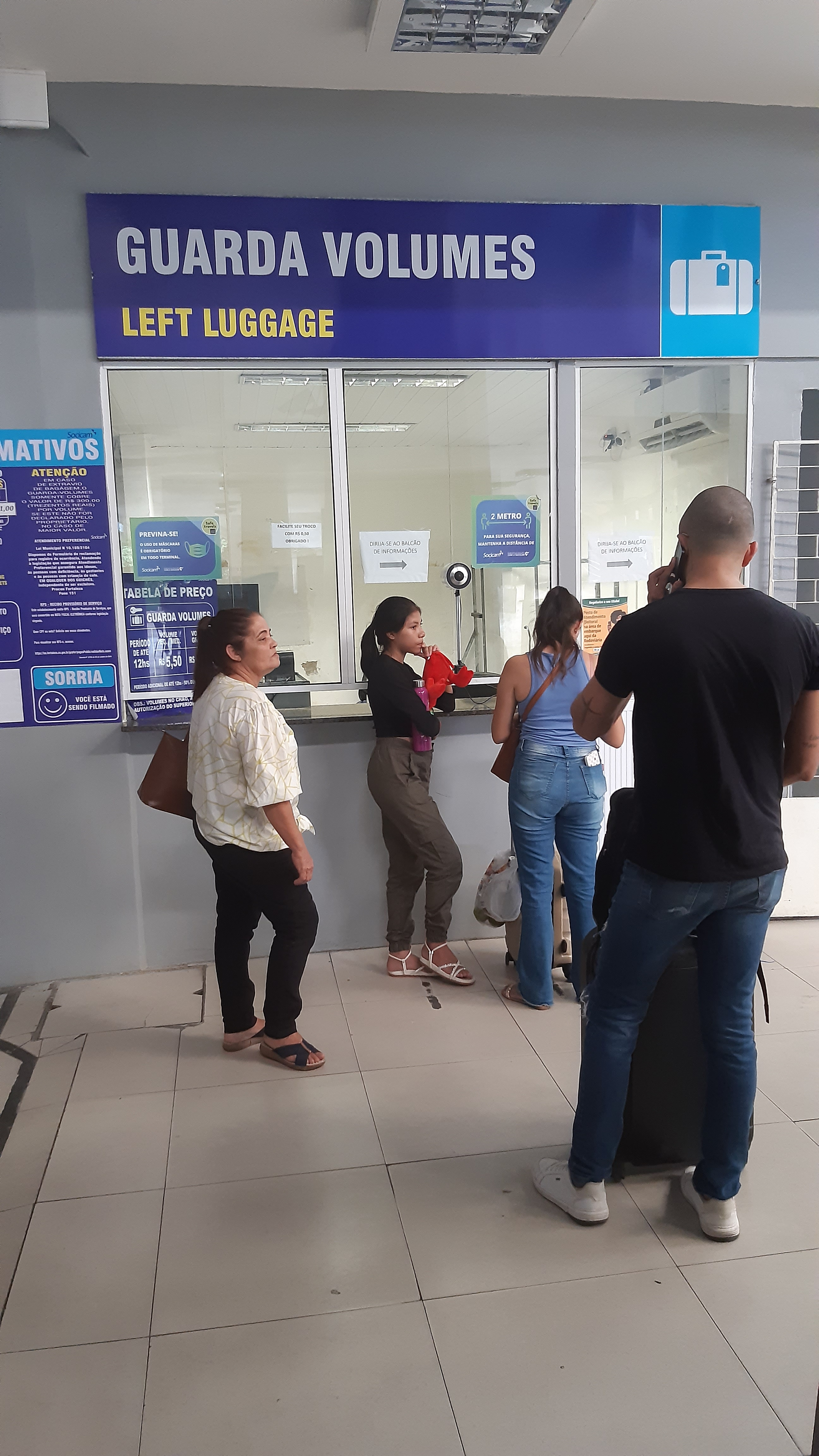
A Left Luggage office at the main bus station of Fortaleza, Brazil

Left luggage, also luggage storage or bag storage, is a place where one can temporarily store one's luggage so as to not have to carry it. Left luggage is not synonymous with lost luggage. Often at an airport or train station there may be a staffed 'left luggage counter' or simply a coin-operated or automated locker system. While threats of terrorism all around the globe have caused this type of public storage to decrease over the past few decades, the sharing economy is causing a revival of the industry. Driven in part by the rapid growth of Airbnb and homestay traveling in general, a number of services offering short-term luggage storage by utilizing unused space at local businesses such as hotels, restaurants and retail shops have emerged.

== Military ==
Baggage can also refer to the train of people and goods, both military and of a personal nature, which commonly followed pre-modern armies on campaign. The baggage was considered a strategic resource and guarded by a rear guard. Its loss was considered to weaken and demoralize an army, leading to rearguard attacks such as that at the Battle of Agincourt.

== See also ==
- Airport check-in
- Emotional baggage, colloquialism referring to unresolved psychological issues
- Gate check bags
- Gate checking
- Luggage scale
- Luggage lock
- Okoban
- Suitcase
- Transportation Security Administration (TSA)
