= Gate checking =

Checking a bag directly at an airport gate

Gate checking refers to the practice that allows passengers to check in their bags directly at the gate. Gate checking is mostly used on small planes when there is not enough space to take on board the cabin bags of all passengers.

Some companies offer different incentives for passengers who volunteer to check their bags at the gate instead of taking them on board. Virgin America offered free early boarding to its passengers who offer to gate check their carry-ons.

== Regulation ==
Airline policies do not allow strollers on board. Passengers travelling with young children can check in their strollers at the gate, free of charge. For each child, airlines allow passengers to check in a stroller and a car seat. Most companies recommend small umbrella-type strollers that fold and many of them have size and weight limits. Almost all airlines return the strollers to the jet bridge upon arriving at destination.

Some companies, such as United Airlines, JetBlue, and Southwest Airlines, assume no liability for any damage produced to gate-checked strollers. For this reason, passengers sometimes store their strollers and car seats in special gate check bags.
