= Farman F.120 =

French aircraft family (1923–1931)

F.120 (F.4X), 121 (F.3X), 122, 123 Jabiru
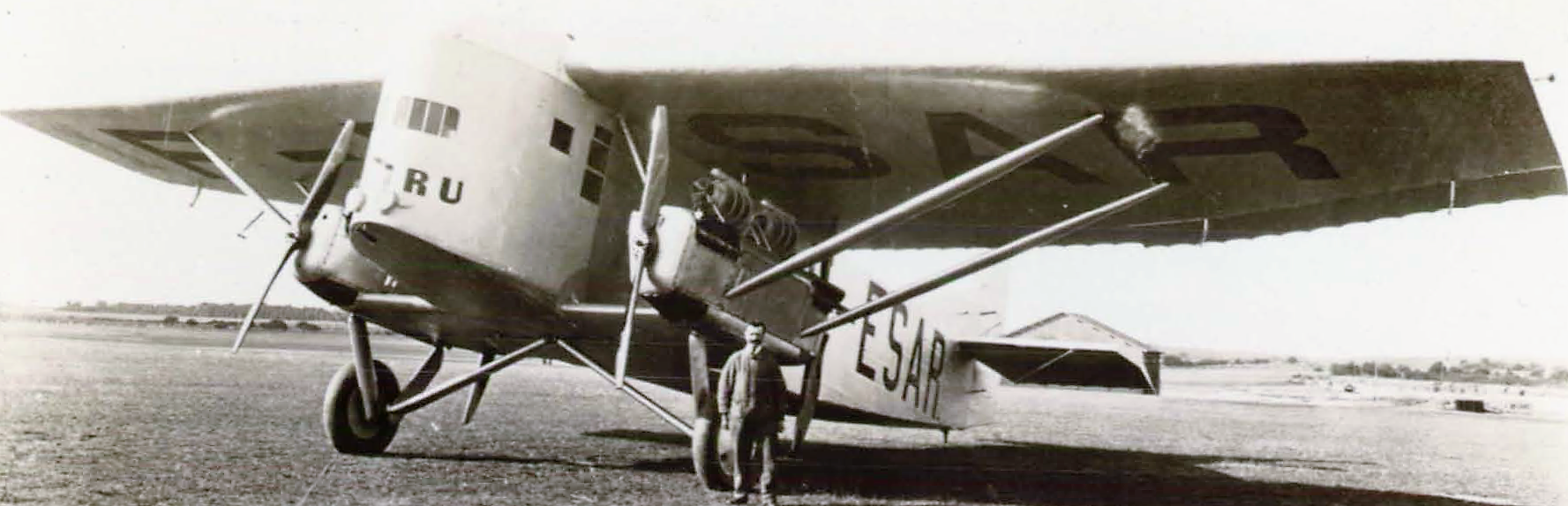
- Farman F.121

General information
- Type: airliner, bomber
- Manufacturer: Farman Aviation Works
- Status: All scrapped or destroyed
- Primary users: France Denmark

History
- Introduction date: 1923
- First flight: 1923
- Retired: 1931

The Farman F.120 were a family of multi-engine monoplane aircraft designed and produced by the French aircraft manufacturer Farman Aviation Works. It was operated in a diverse range of purposes, including as a commercial airliner and as a military bomber aircraft.

The F.120, which received the nickname of Jabiru after a Latin American stork, was a fixed-undercarriage monoplane powered by either two, three or four engines, depending on the variant. It featured an unusually broad chord, low aspect-ratio main wing and a relatively deep fuselage. The trimotor variant had the centerline engine mounted high, which gave the aircraft an unusual appearance.

== Development ==
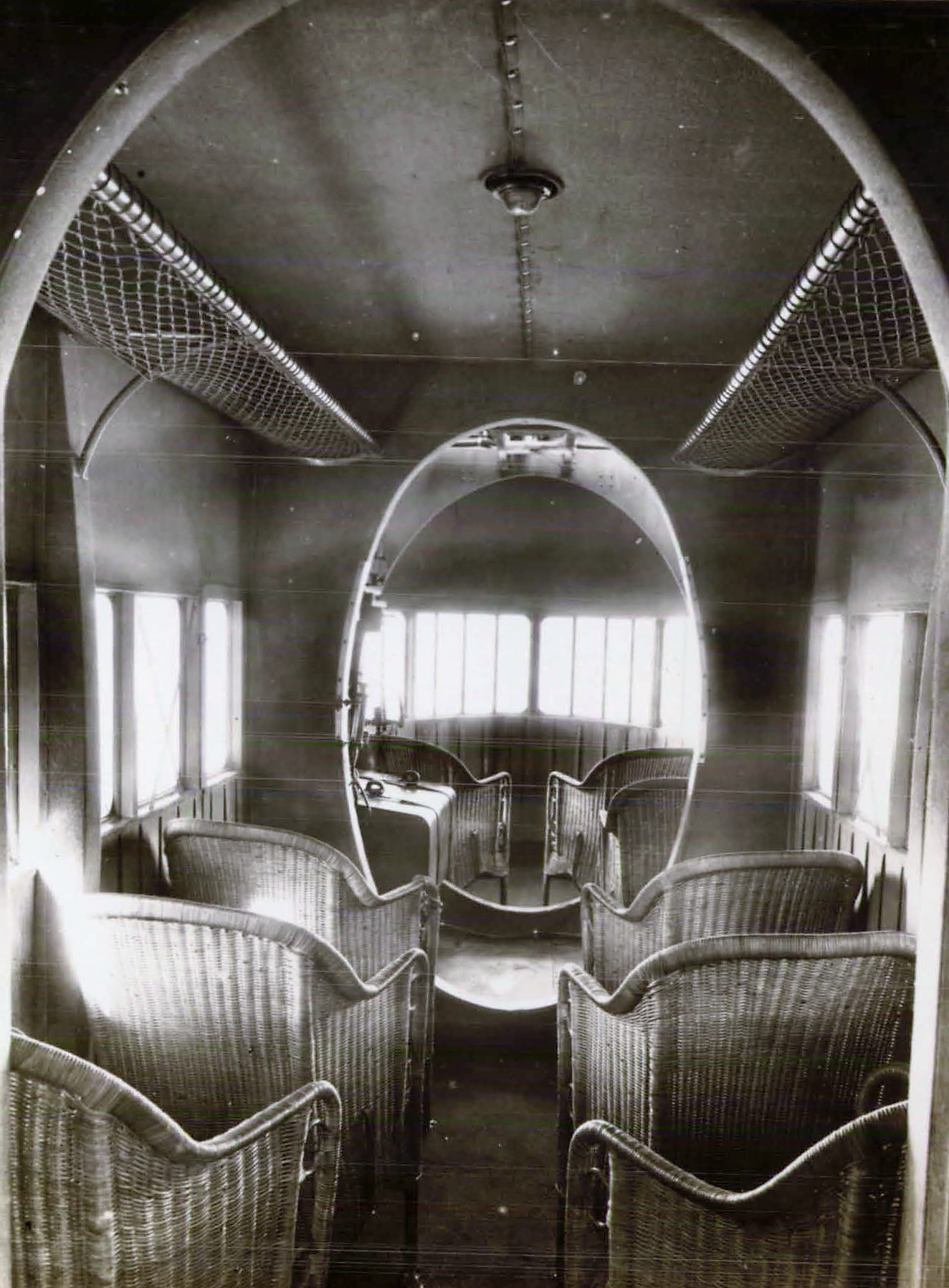
Farman F.121 interior photo from NACA Aircraft Circular No.15

During the early 1920s, the Aero Club of France set out numerous rules and regulations for its commercial airplane contest of 1923. Shortly following their issuing, Farman set about the designing of a new commercial aircraft that would, so far as reasonably possible, entirely fulfil these regulations; they had been judged to be of importance of the prospective aircraft's market appeal as various aerial-navigation companies had, formally or otherwise, adopted these regulations as requirements for their own needs. Additionally, the company's design team pursued several other ambitions, including high reliability levels, good onboard comfort levels, favourable flying characteristics, while also being as economically efficient as possible.

The F.121 or F.3X was the first version to fly, with four 180 hp Hispano-Suiza 8Ac V8 engines mounted in tandem push-pull pairs mounted on stub wings, however, this arrangement caused cooling problems for the rear engines and the F.120/F.4X version followed shortly afterwards, powered by three 300 hp Salmson Az.9 radial engines. Development continued and a single F.122, modified from an F.4X, was powered by a pair of 400 hp Lorraine 12Db engines. Two military versions were also built, the F.123 with two 450 hp Hispano-Suiza 12Hb V12s, or F.124 with two 420 hp Gnome et Rhône 9Ad Jupiter radial engines.

== Design ==
The Farman F.120 was a multi-engine multirole monoplane aircraft. It was relatively well-furnished for the era, being able to routinely conduct night flights via equipment such as searchlights, landing flares, position lights, and general illumination. Various passenger conveniences were present, including individual electric heaters and relatively large glass windows for the passengers to view the landscape below. The electricity, used by the radio set, illumination, and heating, was supplied from wind-driven generators using compact propellers that could be drawn inside the fuselage when not in use. In comparison to most contemporarily aircraft, the aircraft possessed greater manoeuvrability, possessed relatively high stability, ease of handling, and was relatively easy to land.

Dependent on the variant of the aircraft, as many as four engines could be installed. No significant structural changes were required for those aircraft equipped with a different number of engines, such as the trimotor and twin-engined variants. Mid-flight access to the engine was provided via special doors, permitting inspection and even minor repairs to be performed by the crew. The four-engined model of the aircraft had sufficient power that it could still consistently climb even with a single engine out; even the twin-engined model could maintain stable flight on only a single operational engine. The main fuel tanks were housed within the wing, relatively far from the engines; up to two auxiliary fuel tanks could be installed within the engine nacelles, and would operate independently of the main tanks. The aircraft possessed relatively high fuel efficiency for the era.

The F.120 was equipped with a relatively thick wing, possessing a span of 19 m (62.34 ft.) and a chord of 6 m (19.68 ft.) at its centre. Both the thickness and the chord of the wing decrease towards the tips. The supporting framework of the wing was entirely enclosed. Both the spars and struts formed V-shaped girders on either side of the fuselage. The undercarriage consists of two main wheels that were supported by a pair of vertical V-shaped members that joined with oblique steel tubing to connective with the base of the fuselage.

The fuselage was internally divided into various sections; the foremost section contained the baggage compartment along with, after which and just forward of the wing, the cockpit. This cockpit provided two seats for its crew, typically comprising one pilot and an assistant. The centre of the fuselage was occupied by the passenger compartment, which had sufficient space for up to 12 passengers to travel on comfortable seats even with a central isle. To the rear of the fuselage was the navigator's room, which was fairly sizable and provisioned with then-modern instrumentation, including a drift meter, compass, radio set, work table and map holder; adjacent to this room was the lavatory. Primary access to the interior was via a single sliding door, while multiple exits were provided across the aircraft to aid in emergency egress.

On account of having an entirely unobstructed fuselage base, it was relatively straightforward to convert the aircraft into an armed military configuration, such as that of a bomber or a torpedo plane. Furthermore, its speed and manoeuvrability were sufficient that it could realistically engage in aerial combat despite its carriage of relatively heavy bomb loadouts. The presence of multiple independent engines and its reliability meant that the aircraft could be realistically used over the sea.

== Operational history ==
Despite being most commonly seen in lists of ugliest aircraft, following its first flight in 1923, the F.120 won a French airliner competition, the 1923 Grand Prix des Avions de Transports and its 500,000 francs first prize, before seeing service with several European airlines.

The F.120 was capable of carrying up to nine passengers, and served on Farman airline's route Paris-Brussels-Amsterdam, but also with Danish Air Lines between Copenhagen and Amsterdam. They served until the late 1920s.

== Variants ==
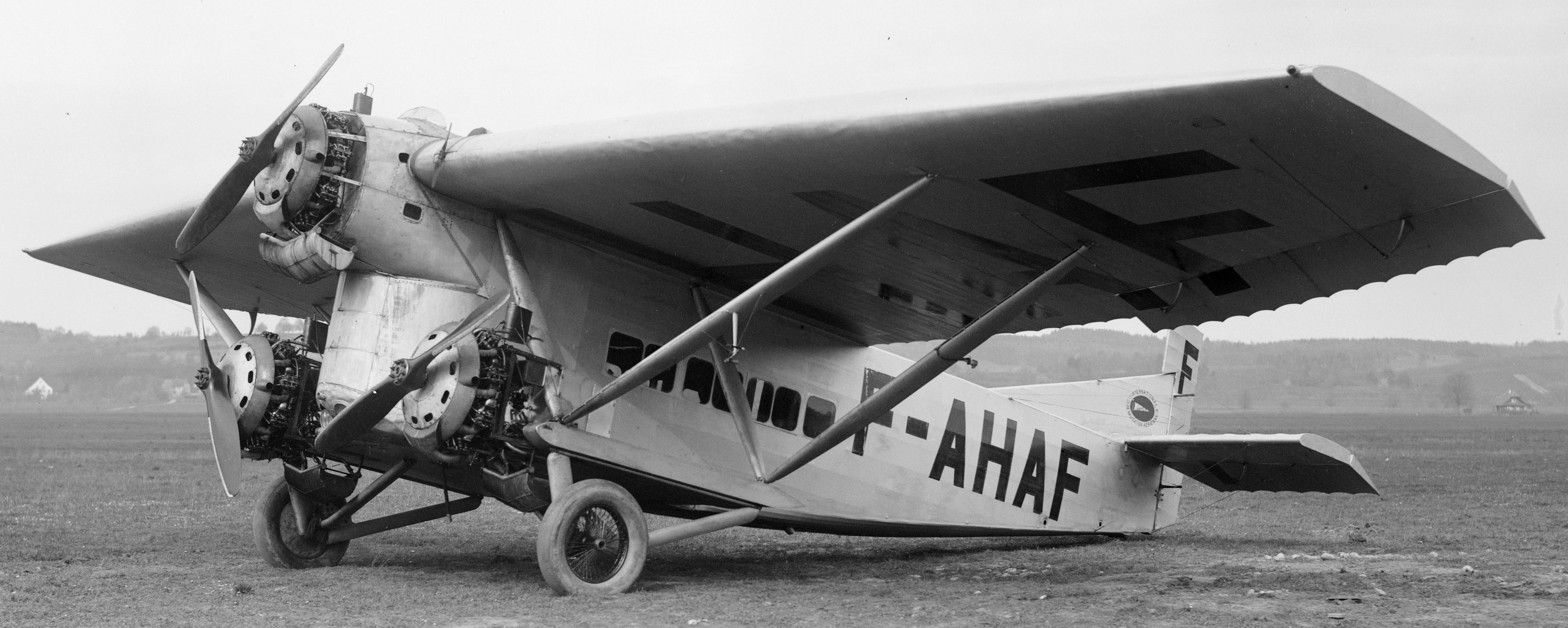
A Farman F.4X of the French airline CIDNA at Dübendorf airfield near Zürich, circa 1925.

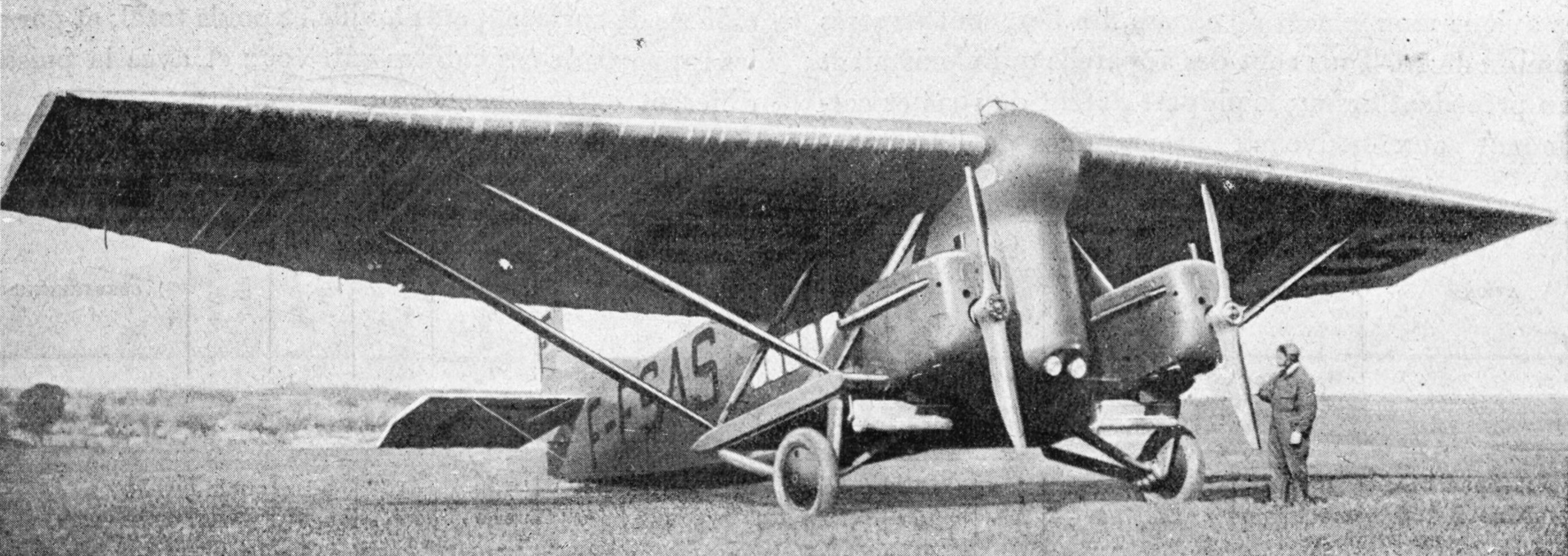
Farman F.3bis with twin Lorraine engines, from L'Aéronautique, December 1924.

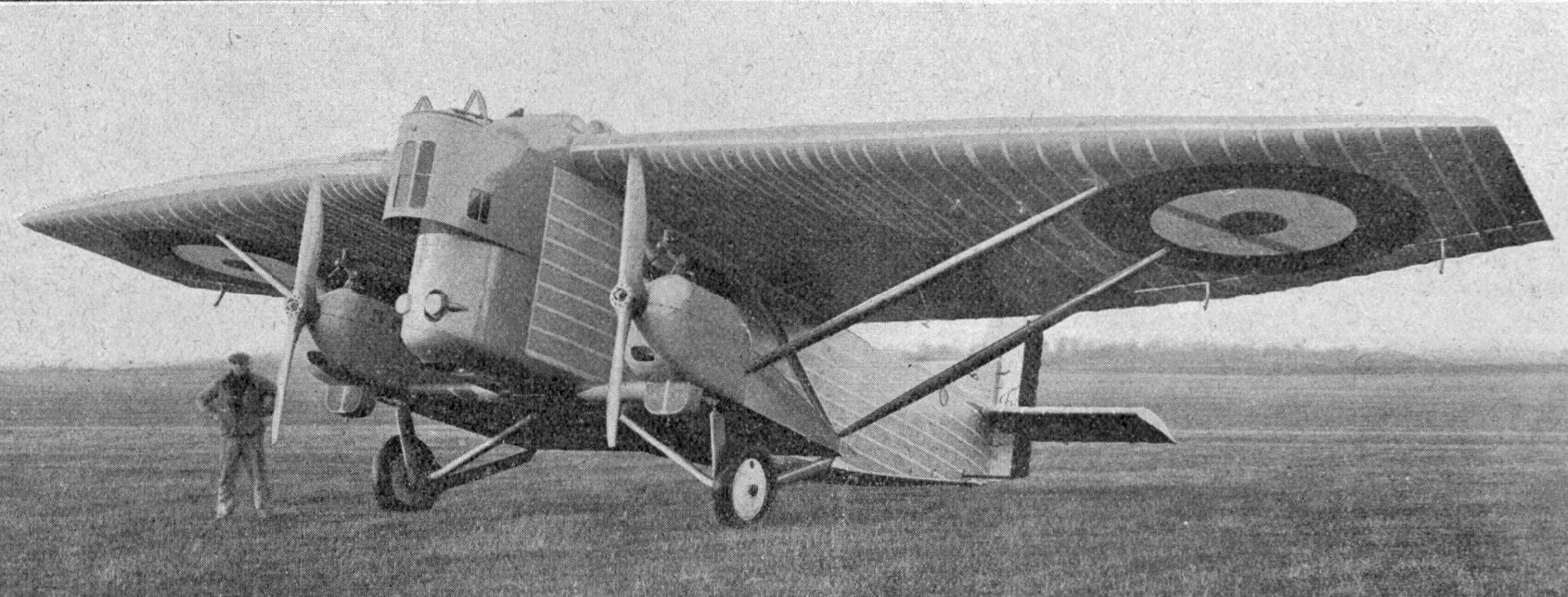
Farman F.123 bomber, from L'Aéronautique, October 1926.

F.120
A single engined biplane bomber, powered by a 280 kW (370 hp) Lorraine 12Da engine. First flown in 1924, only two F.120 bombers were built.
F.4X
The original designation of the F.120 Jabiru
F.120 Jabiru
Four transport monoplanes powered by 3x 220 kW (300 hp) Salmson 9AZ water-cooled radial engines.
F.3bis
A twin engined transport aircraft powered by 2x 300 kW (400 hp) Lorraine 12Db engines, 1 built.
F.3X
The original designation of the F.121 Jabiru prototype.
F.121 Jabiru
Nine transport aircraft powered by 4x 130 kW (180 hp) Hispano-Suiza 8Ac engines, one also modified from a F.120 Jabiru.
F.122
A single transport aircraft powered by 2x 300 kW (400 hp) Lorraine 12Db engines.
F.123
A single three-seater bomber powered by 2x 300 kW (400 hp) Hispano-Suiza 12Hb engines.
F.124
A single three-seater bomber powered by 2x 310 kW (420 hp) Gnome et Rhône 9Ad Jupiter engines.

=== Civil operators ===
Denmark

- Danish Air Lines

France

- Farman airlines

== Specifications (F.121) ==
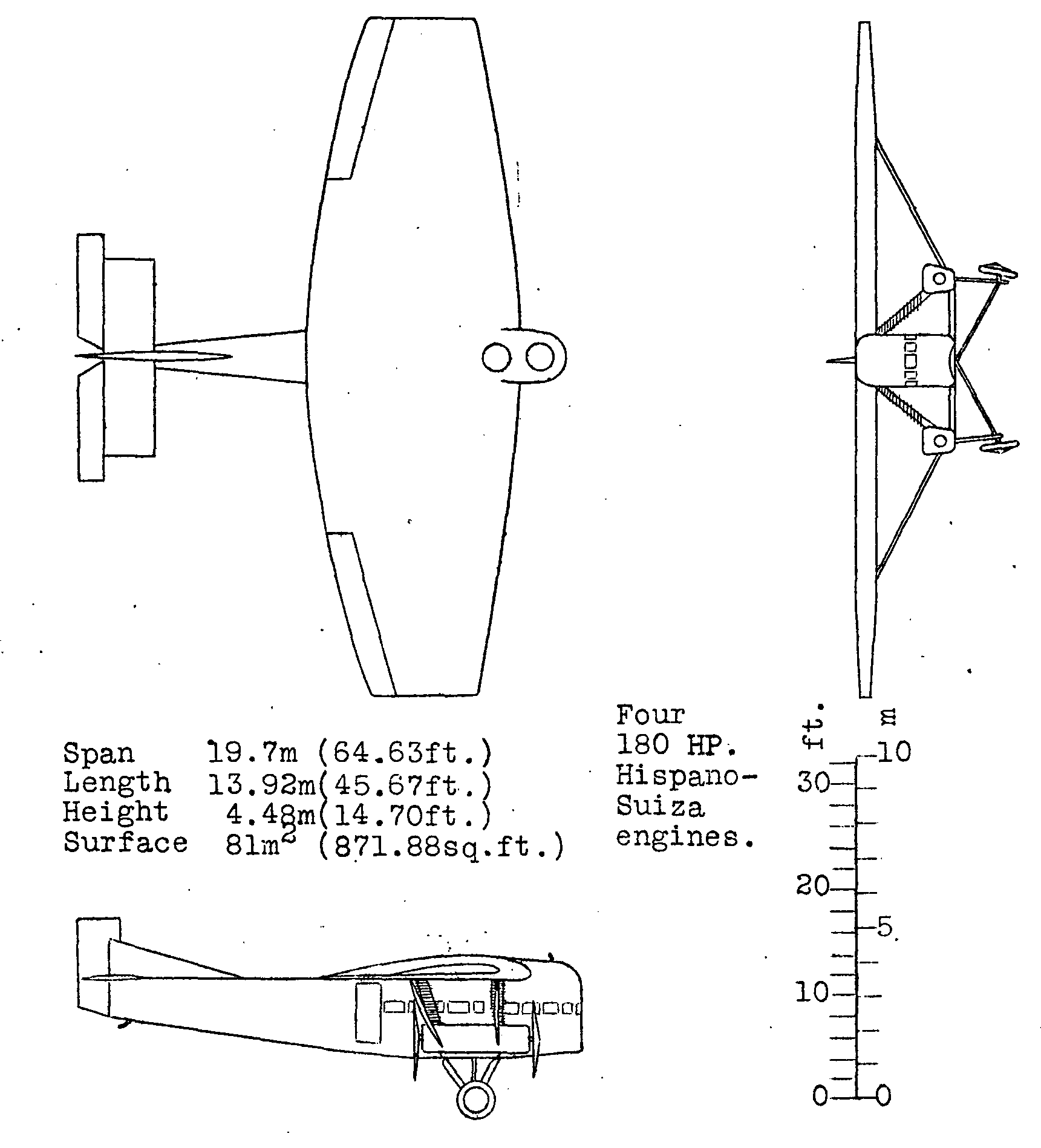
Farman F.121 3 view drawing from NACA Aircraft Circular No.15

Data from Jane's all the World's Aircraft 1928, Aviafrance: Farman F-121

General characteristics

- Crew: 2
- Capacity: 12-19 pax
- Length: 13.92 m (45 ft 8 in)
- Wingspan: 19 m (62 ft 4 in)
- Height: 4.48 m (14 ft 8 in)
- Wing area: 81 m^{2} (870 sq ft)
- Empty weight: 3,404 kg (7,505 lb)
- Gross weight: 5,220 kg (11,508 lb)
- Fuel capacity: 1,000 L (260 US gal; 220 imp gal)
- Powerplant: 4 × Hispano-Suiza 8Ac V-8 water-cooled piston engines, 130 kW (180 hp) each
- Propellers: 2-bladed fixed pitch propellers

Performance

- Maximum speed: 209 km/h (130 mph, 113 kn) at sea level

201 km/h (125 mph; 109 kn) at 2,000 m (6,600 ft)
192 km/h (119 mph; 104 kn) at 3,000 m (9,800 ft)

- Cruise speed: 175 km/h (109 mph, 94 kn)
- Range: 750 km (470 mi, 400 nmi)
- Service ceiling: 4,250 m (13,940 ft)
- Time to altitude: 1,000 m (3,300 ft) in six minutes and 16 seconds

2,000 m (6,600 ft) in 14 minutes and 14 seconds
3,000 m (9,800 ft) in 26 minutes and 11 seconds
4,000 m (13,000 ft) in 37 minutes and 22 seconds

- Wing loading: 61.8 kg/m^{2} (12.7 lb/sq ft)
- Power/mass: 0.1075 kW/kg (0.0654 hp/lb)

== Popular culture ==
The american baggage manufacturer Tom Bihn has long used a Farman F.121 Jabiru in its logo.
