= Gate check bag =

Gate check bags are travel bags specially designed for the transportation and storage of car seats and strollers or pushchairs. Generally used for airline travel, they also provide protection from dust when in storage for the occasional user. When used for airline travel the strollers and car seats are placed in gate check bags at the departure gate before boarding. The bags protect strollers and car seats from dirt whilst in the loading or cargo bay as well as from elements such as rain or snow if left on the tarmac.

Strollers and car seats can be checked without a bag, but airline companies do not assume any liability for damage so it is advised to use a special bag. Passengers have to make sure that the gate check tag is visibly displayed on the bag if they need their stroller or car seat returned at the gate upon arrival. Gate check bags for strollers and car seats are usually made of strong and light fabric, such as ballistic nylon that is waterproof and offers protection from the weather on the tarmac.

== Types ==
1. Universal stroller and car seat travel bags: lightweight and economical travel bags designed to fit most strollers and car seats. Universal stroller and car seats travel bags are usually made of light, waterproof materials and they can be carried to the gate in a normal carry-on baggage. They can be found in three large categories:

- Car seat travel bag – keeps any car seats safe, secure, and free from dirt
- Single stroller travel bag – designed to fit most umbrella style strollers
- Double stroller travel bag – offers protection for most jogging strollers, double strollers, and travel systems

2. Custom stroller and car seat travel bags: designed to fit a particular stroller or car seat model. They are made of different materials, depending on the manufacturer, and they are usually padded, which makes them heavier and harder to carry. Custom travel bags are also more expensive than universal travel bags.

== Airline policies ==
Delta checks strollers and car seats for free either at the curbside, at the ticket counter or at the gate.

United Airlines checks strollers without a fee. No strollers are allowed as carry-on baggage and only small, collapsible strollers can be checked at the gate. Upon request, the stroller can be delivered to the aircraft door at the connecting city or destination. The company does not assume any responsibility for any damage that might occur to strollers or car seat that are not checked at the check-in counter packed in a box.

American Airlines allows one stroller and one car seat per ticketed passenger. However, only small, collapsible strollers up to 20 lbs/9 kg can be checked at the gate. Strollers that are non-collapsible or heavier than 20 lbs/9 kg must be checked at the ticket counter.

Southwest Airlines gives customers traveling with children the chance to free check in any type of stroller and CRS or car seat either at the curb, at the ticket counter or at the gate. The company does not assume any liability for damage to strollers, CRSs or car seats.

Air Canada recommends the use of small collapsible umbrella type strollers with a collapsed diameter of maximum diameter of 25.5 cm (10 in) and maximum length of 92 cm (36 in) for free gate checking. Large strollers can only be checked in and will count as one piece of baggage. A car seat can be checked in for free.

British Airways allows free gate checking of one car seat and one fully collapsible stroller with maximum dimensions of 117 cm x 38 cm x 38 cm / 46 in x 15 in x 15 in.

KLM allows one completely collapsible stroller for each child. If the stroller will not fit under the seat or in the overhead baggage compartment it can be checked in at no extra charge. A stroller travel bag may be used if it does not contain any other items. The same policy applies for children car seats.
