= Carpet bag =

Travel bag made from carpet or similar materials

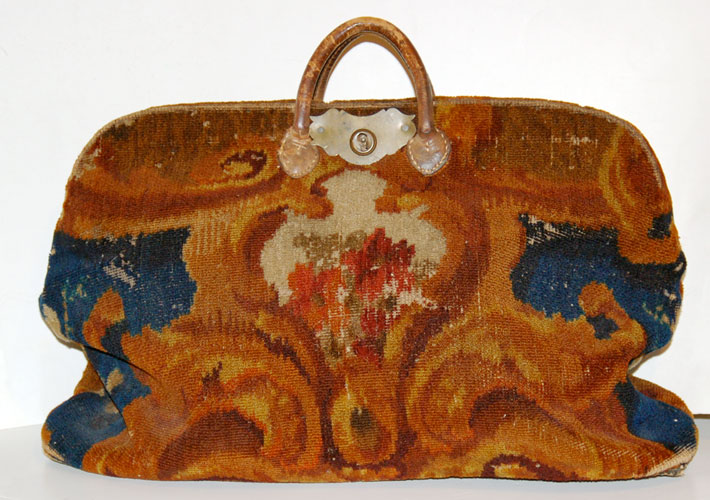
Reconstruction-era carpet bag, made from a remnant of printed tapestry velvet carpet (Whytock; patent 1832, Edinburgh), a pile similar to Brussels carpeting. Extant examples of this style of carpet can be seen at Hampton National Historic Site in Towson, Maryland, and Andrew Jackson's Hermitage in Nashville, Tennessee.

A carpet bag is a top-opening travelling bag made of pile carpet, commonly from Brussels carpeting. It was a popular form of luggage in the United States and Europe in the 19th century, featuring simple handles and only an upper frame, which served as its closure. Some small modern versions are used as handbags or purses.

== History ==
The carpet bag was invented as a type of inexpensive personal baggage light enough for a passenger to carry, like a duffel bag, as opposed to a large rigid wooden or metal trunk, which required the assistance of porters. In 1886, the Scientific American described it as old-fashioned and reliable, "still unsurpassed by any, where rough wear is the principal thing to be studied. Such a bag, if constructed of good Brussels carpeting and unquestionable workmanship, will last a lifetime, provided always that a substantial frame is used." Its use implied self-sufficiency: in Jules Verne's 1873 novel Around the World in Eighty Days, Phileas Fogg and Passepartout bring only a carpet bag as luggage, which holds a few items of clothing and a great deal of cash.

Carpet bags were made with pile carpet, woven mechanically on the Brussels loom, incorporating the Jacquard pattern-selecting mechanism, the pile consisting of rows of loops, formed over wires inserted weftwise during weaving and subsequently withdrawn. Brussels carpet was the first type to be woven in a loom. Carpet was the chosen material because "remainder" pieces were easily bought for its manufacture.

Some carpet bags could also serve as a "railway rug", a common item in the 19th century for warmth in drafty, unheated rail-cars. The rug could either be opened as a blanket, or latched up on the sides as a travelling bag. From Robert Louis Stevenson's Travels with a Donkey in the Cévennes (1879): "... my railway-rug, which, being also in the form of a bag, made me a double castle for cold nights."

Carpetbags made something of a brief resurgence in the 1960s with the emergence of the Hippie generation, salvaged from old family attics and second-hand stores. This gave rise to limited new manufacture as a trendy fashion accessory.

== Cultural impact ==
The carpetbaggers of the Reconstruction Era following the American Civil War were Northerners who moved to the South for economic or political opportunity. They were given their name from carrying this type of luggage.
