= Luggage scale =

Tool used to weigh baggage

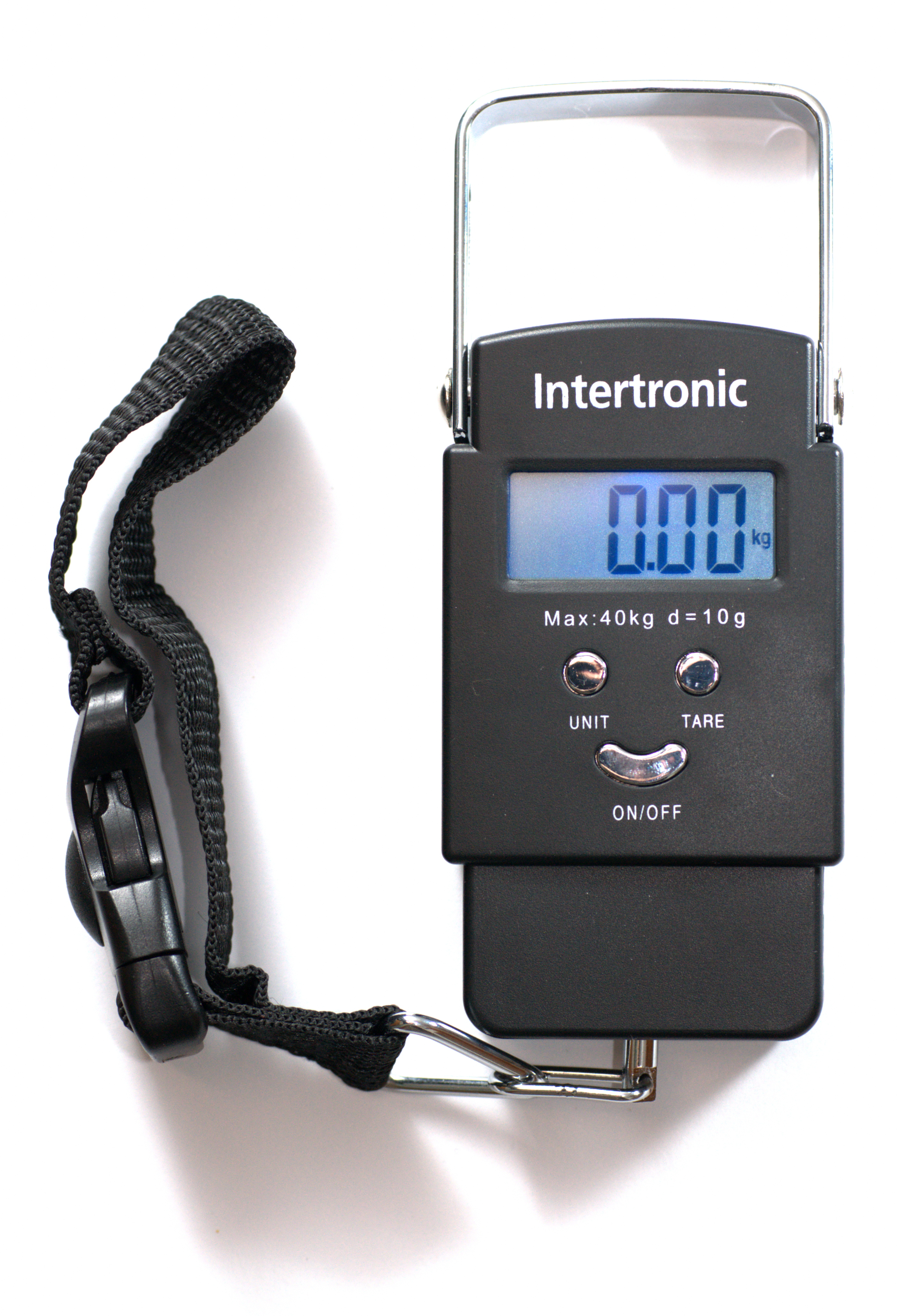
Baggage weighing scale

A luggage scale, also called a baggage scale or a suitcase scale, is used to weigh luggage to avoid luggage being overweight.
