= Train case =

Piece of luggage

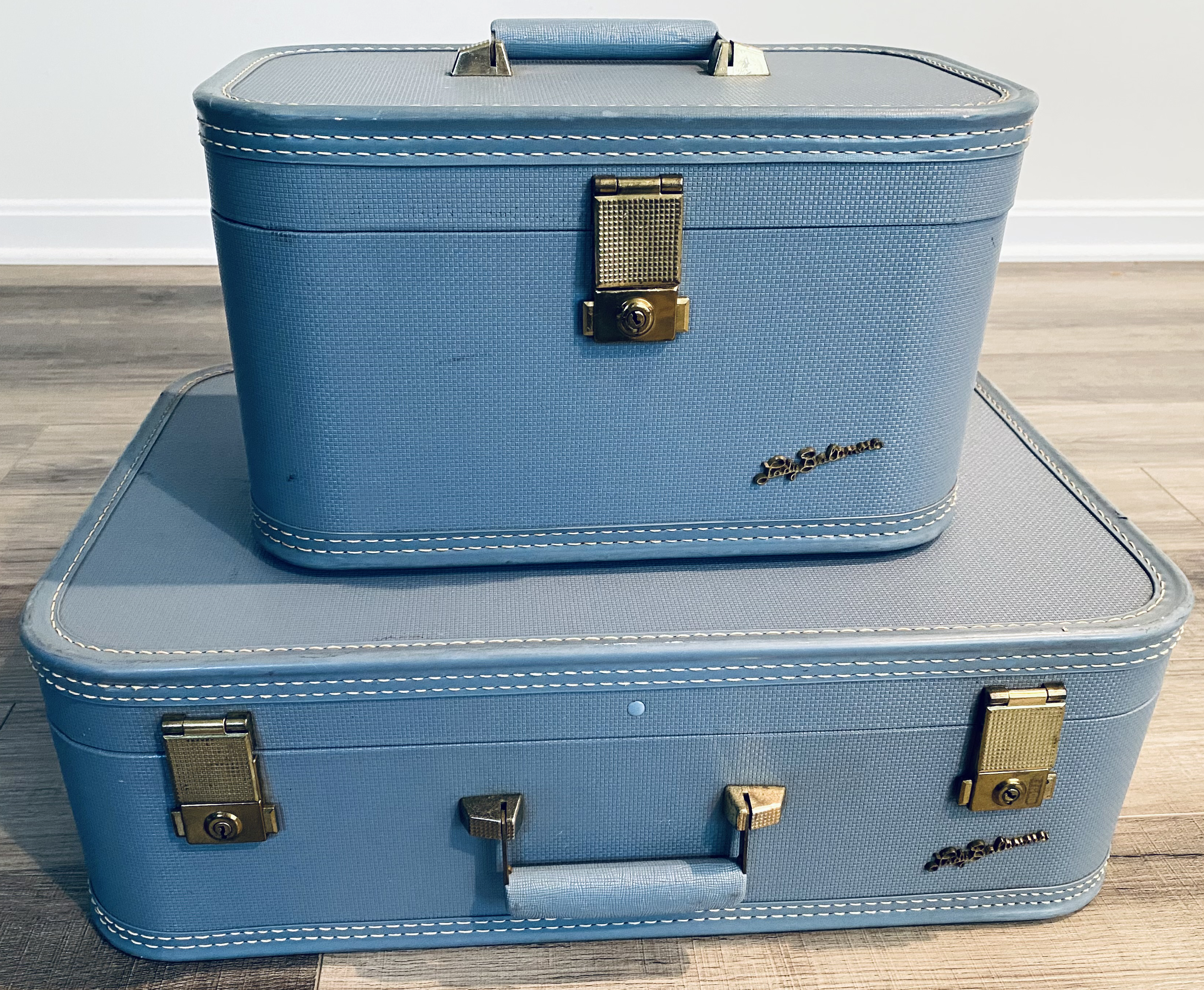
Vintage Lady Baltimore train case set from the 1950s

A train case is a piece of luggage, used especially for personal grooming articles, usually smaller and boxlike. Nécessaire de voyage (fr) predate train cases but contain similar tools, such as brushes, and consumables, such as cosmetics.

A train case lid has a carry handle on the outside center of the lid, a mirror on the inside of the lid, with a removable insert tray for smaller items suspended over the larger, main compartment.
