= Baggage allowance =

Bags allowed per commercial transportation passenger

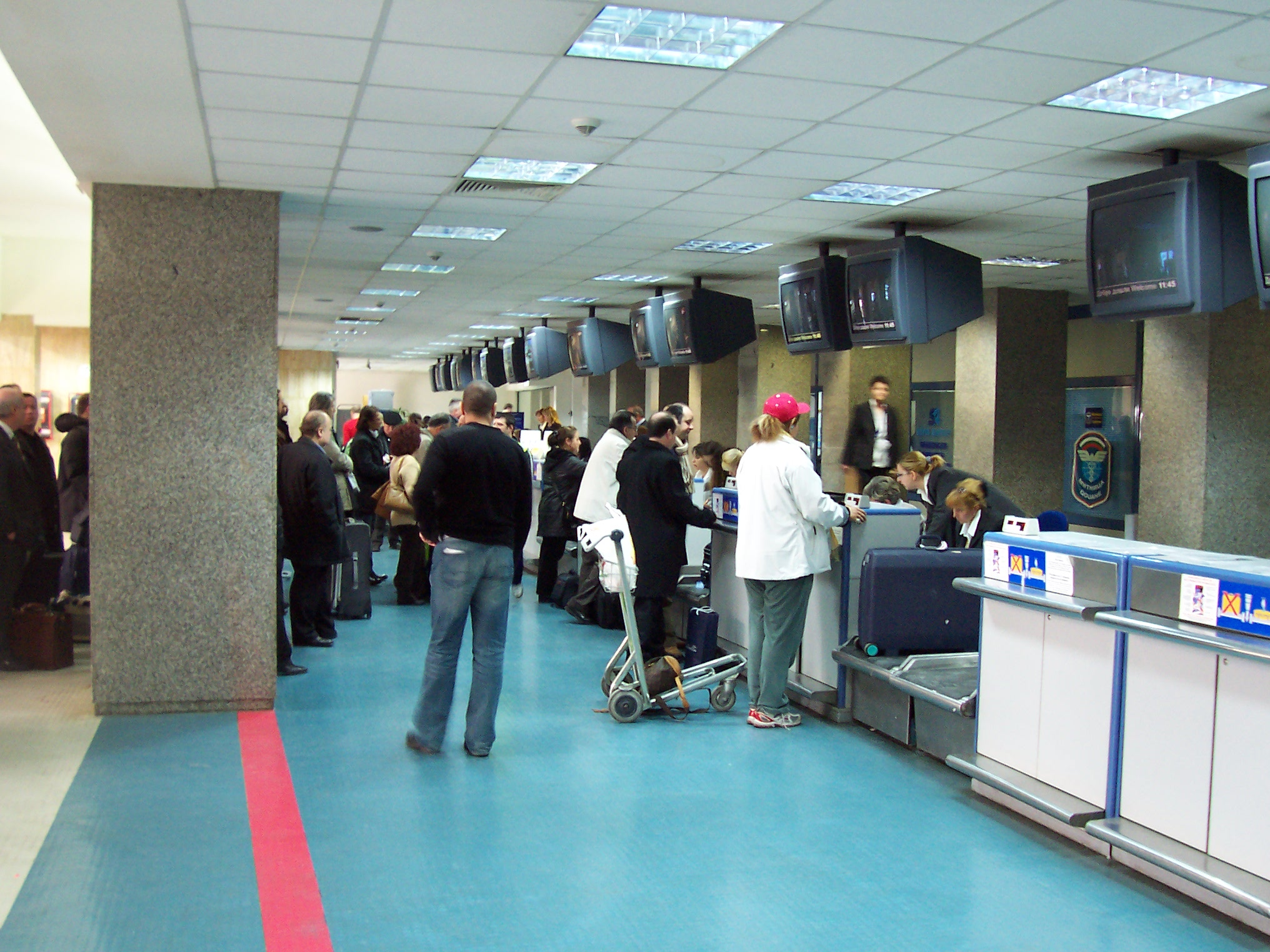
Luggage is weighed as passengers check in at the airport.

On commercial transportation, mostly with airlines, the baggage allowance is the amount of checked baggage or hand/carry-on luggage the company will allow per passenger. There may be limits on the amount that is allowed free of charge and hard limits on the amount that is allowed.

The limits vary per airline and depend on the class, elite status, ticket type, flight origin, and destination. If a flight is booked with another flight, it may also have different limits (e.g., if another flight on the same ticket is a long-haul flight). The exact baggage conditions are mentioned in the ticket information online.

== Types of baggage ==
There are two types of baggage on aircraft, which are treated differently: checked baggage and cabin/hand/carry-on luggage. Transportation companies have rules on the weight and size of both types.

The weight is usually the limiting factor for checked baggage stored in the aircraft hold. All checked items are generally weighed by the airline during check-in, and if they exceed the limit, the passenger is informed by the airline. To avoid any fees, the passenger often must switch some of the items found in the suitcase to another suitcase or else carry it on.

Carry-on luggage is judged primarily by size. Bags are measured by dimension or in total linear measurement (length + width + height). Although the European airlines follower similar size limit, which is 22 in × 16 in × 8 in (56 cm × 41 cm × 20 cm), and weight limit, which is between 15 and 22 lb (6.8 and 10.0 kg), the actual limits vary by airlines. There may also be other restrictions on the types of belongings that can be carried on the plane.

== IATA ==
The International Air Transport Association (IATA) has released recommendations for limits on checked baggage and carry-on luggage. Some companies adhere to these recommendations, some adhere partially, and some do not adhere at all.

The recommendations for checked baggage are: advised maximum weight 23 kg (50.7 lbs), weight limit 32 kg (70.6 lbs), advised maximum size 158 cm (62.2 in) length + width + height, limit 203 cm (nearly 80 in). The limit of 23 kg is present because of similar health and safety regulations limits.

Because of the wide variation in hand/carry-on luggage limits, in 2015 IATA released a size recommendation for suitcases meant as hand/carry-on luggage. These state that suitcases should have a maximum size of 55 cm (21.6 in) long, 35 cm (13.8 in) wide and 20 cm (7.9 in) deep. If they meet these requirements, the bag may carry the logo "IATA cabin OK". This limit is tighter than most current airline limits, so bags with this logo are practically allowed everywhere.

== Standard concepts ==
Two concepts for baggage weight limits are in use.

=== Piece Concept ===
The Piece Concept applied only to passengers traveling to or from the Americas. From 1 August 2019, however, Vietnam Airlines (IATA Area 3) adopted the Piece Concept. Under the Piece Concept, passengers are permitted to check in a certain number of suitcases with a per-bag weight of up to 23 kilograms for Economy Class, and up to 32 kilograms for Business or First Class. The allowed weight per suitcase and the number of suitcases varies per airline and depends on the class, elite status, type of ticket, flight origin, and destination.

=== Weight Concept ===
Under the Weight Concept, each passenger can check in a total weight regardless of the number of suitcases. Often passengers traveling together can also combine their allowed weights. The total weight varies per airline and depends on the class, elite status, type of ticket, flight origin, and destination.

=== Baggage pooling ===
During the departure in an airport, assembling all the associated baggage of passengers who are to be checked in together and checking those baggages in the name of one passenger is known as a pooling of the baggage.

== Fees ==
Baggage fees in the United States have been the norm for many airlines, and the trend is predicted to continue with many trans-Atlantic flights starting to collect fees for the lowest cost tickets. Typically, baggage fees are included in the ticket price. Different airline websites will normally explicitly state their baggage fee policy and limits. IdeaWorks, a travel consulting firm, predicted fees will become the norm by the end of 2019 and globally thereafter.

The 23 largest airlines in the United States reported earning $4.6 billion in baggage fees in 2017. This increased to $33 billion in baggage fees for 2023, and increase of 15 percent over the previous year.

In recent years, pressure from European consumer organizations, most notably the European Consumer Organization (BEUC), along with several members of the European Parliament, has increased regarding airline policies on hand baggage. Criticism, particularly intensified by seven major EU airlines charging passengers for hand luggage, calls for standardized carry-on baggage dimensions and fees across all EU carriers. Advocates of standardization argue that air travelers should benefit from clearer and more consistent baggage rules. In response, Transport and Tourism Committee proposed have voted in favor of measures aimed at eliminating confusing carry-on charges and promoting uniform regulations within the aviation sector. The proposal still requires approval from EU member states.
