= Checked baggage =

Baggage stored in a vessel's cargo hold

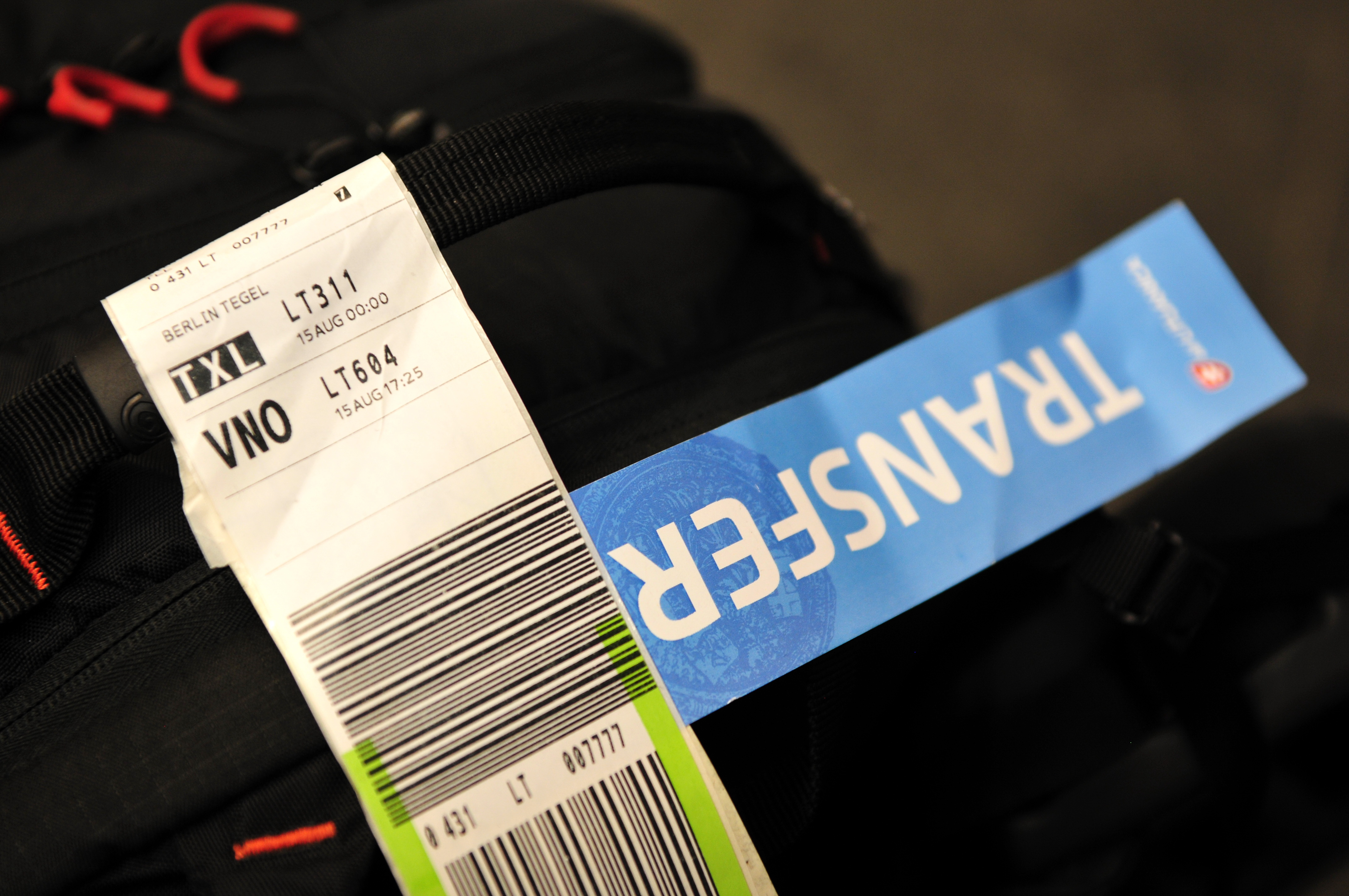
A suitcase labelled as checked baggage on arrival at Berlin Tegel Airport. The bag tag attached to the handle enables the baggage handlers to load the baggage onto the correct aircraft.

Checked baggage is luggage delivered to an airline or train for transportation in the hold of an aircraft, storage on a coach bus or baggage car of a passenger train. Checked baggage is inaccessible to the passenger during the flight or ride, as opposed to carry-on baggage.

This baggage is limited by airlines with regard to size, weight, and number, usually dependent upon the fare paid, or class of ticket. Baggage exceeding the limits is regarded as excess baggage.

== Checked baggage on airlines ==
=== Checked baggage policies ===
Every airline has its own policies with regard to baggage allowance. Often the policy is also dependent on where the flight goes to or comes from. Tickets executed by multiple airlines may have different rules. Usually the exact conditions of a specific booking are mentioned in the ticket information online.

On short-haul internal flights in the US and Canada, checked baggage is no longer complimentary with most discounted economy tickets, and must be paid for in addition to the ticket price; a passenger generally has to hold a higher or full fare economy ticket, travel in a premium cabin, hold elite status on an airline, or an airline credit card to be afforded complimentary checked baggage. For long-haul and transoceanic flights, checked baggage is generally included as standard. However, with the introduction of basic economy fares, some tickets can be purchased without the inclusion of checked baggage.

Low-cost carriers such as Ryanair in Europe and AirAsia in Asia charge for checked baggage, whilst for full-service airlines the cost is included in the ticket price. Beginning with flights booked on or after May 28, 2025, Southwest Airlines ended its long-standing policy of allowing two free checked bags for most passengers. The airline now charges $35 for the first checked bag and $45 for the second.

=== Passenger-baggage reconciliation ===
According to the rules of most air transportation authorities, such as the U.S. Federal Aviation Administration and European Union's Joint Aviation Authorities, should passengers flying internationally with checked baggage fail to arrive at the departure gate before the flight is closed, that person's baggage must be retrieved from the aircraft hold before the flight is permitted to take off. For Singapore, passengers with prohibited items are required to take it out from the bags retrieved at the check-in counter, failing which the baggage will be flagged with prohibited items and will be dumped away before boarding. In the United States, this does not apply to domestic flights since all bags are required to go through explosive detection machines (EDS) prior to loading. Making sure passengers board flights onto which they have checked baggage is called "passenger-baggage reconciliation" and is accomplished automatically through two commercially available systems. The security presumption of passenger-baggage reconciliation is that terrorists will not want to kill themselves, and will not board an aircraft if they have caused a bomb to be placed in its hold. This presumption does not hold true of suicide bombers.

Unaccompanied suitcases led to the downing of four flights, when a bomb inside the suitcase exploded:

- 1983: Gulf Air Flight 771
- 1985: Air India Flight 182
- 1988: Pan Am Flight 103
- 1989: UTA Flight 772

== Restrictions ==
Spare lithium-ion batteries, inclusive of battery packs and powerbanks are not allowed on checked-in luggage.

== Excess baggage ==
Excess baggage refers to the amount of baggage that is in excess of the free allowance in size, number, or weight permitted for the journey. At the carrier's discretion, this may be carried at an extra charge, but no guarantee is made and it may have to be sent as freight instead. Some airlines impose excess baggage embargoes on certain (usually smaller) routes, indicating that they will accept no (or very little) excess baggage.

== See also ==
- Bag tag
