= Packing cube =

Small bag for packing of clothes

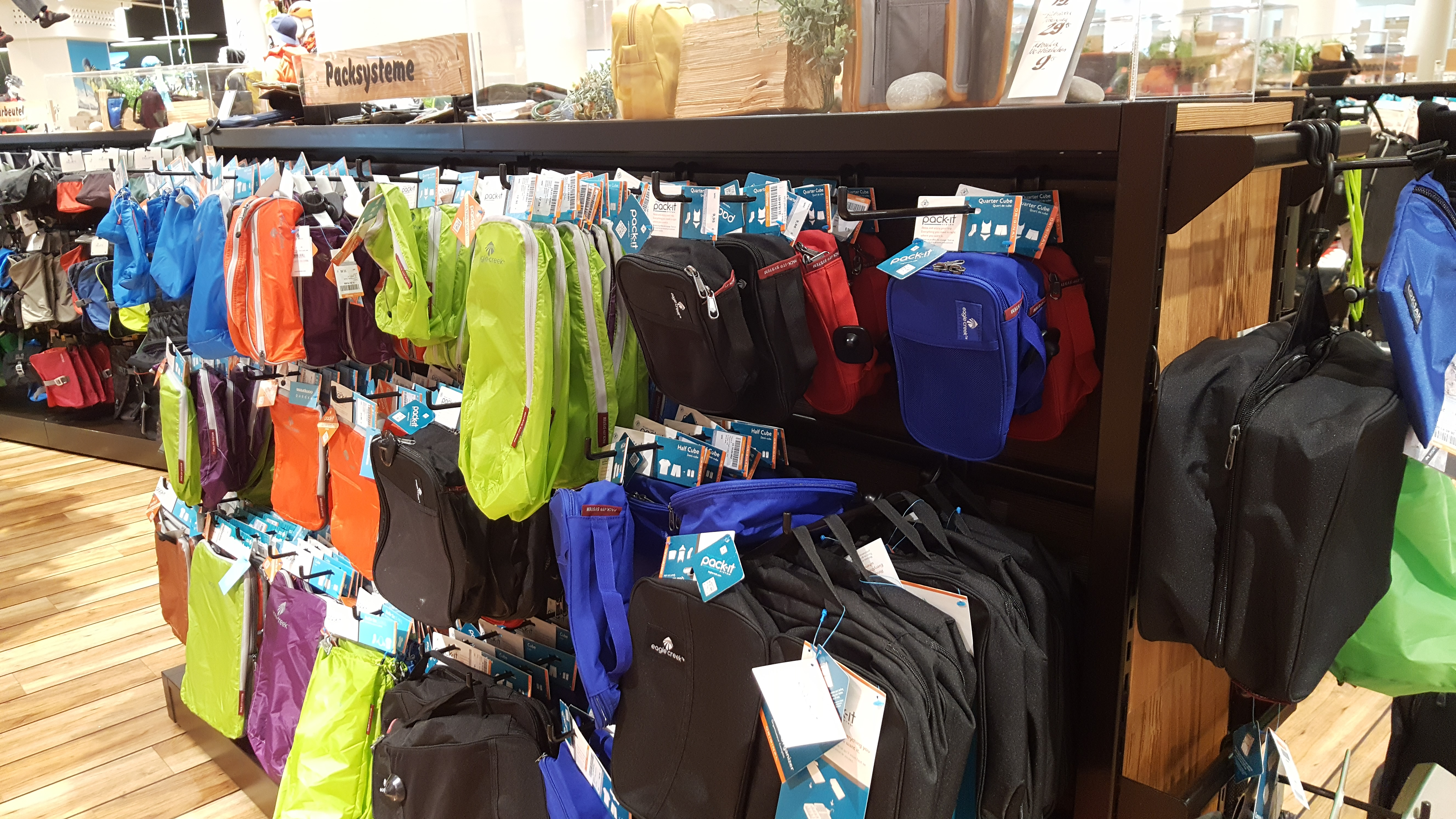
Packing cubes are small cube-shaped containers for packing of clothes.

A packing cube (or packing square, packing pouch) is a small bag designed to organize and compartmentalize clothes inside luggage, as well as to compress clothing to ensure optimum use of space.

Packing cubes are used by backpackers, business travelers, and holidaymakers. Packing cubes can also be used to organize items in the home such as crochet supplies, linens and winter clothing.

They are meant to replace the classical heavy bags with fixed compartments that cannot be customized to accommodate the different needs of travelers.
