= Stroller =

Wheeled device for transporting infants

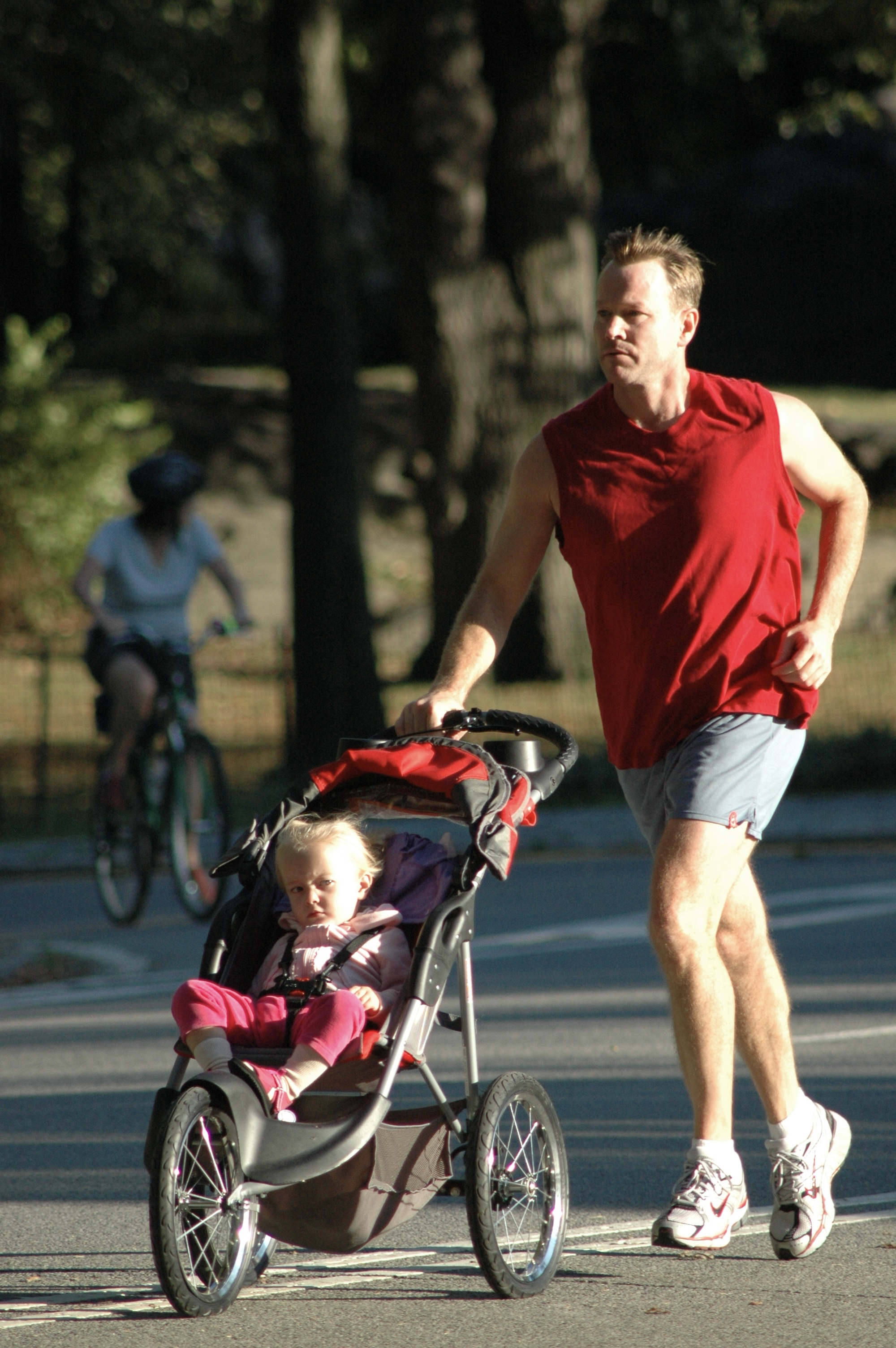
A man pushing a baby in a stroller while jogging.

A stroller, also known as a pushchair or buggy (British English), is a wheeled device used for transporting infants and young children. Strollers can have a variety of features such as cup holders, a storage basket, or the ability to carry multiple children.

Contemporary strollers replace the function of historical prams and may be used as an alternative to a baby sling. Some people make a distinction between strollers used for transporting infants, referring to these devices as a pram or a baby carriage. Strollers used for older children that are capable of sitting may be referred to as a buggy or pushchair.

== History ==
The earliest known stroller was developed in 1733 by English architect William Kent. Originally clam-shaped and made with wood, wicker and brass, Kent intended for the stroller to be driven by a small animal, such as a goat. In 1889, William Richardson designed the first reversible baby stroller, allowing the parent to face themselves towards or away from the baby while still pushing forward.

The popularization of curb cuts in the 1970s was originally intended to improve accessibility for people with disabilities, but this feature also helped parents using strollers. Collapsible strollers were invented by a British company called Tan-Sad, post WW1. Stroller components are typically a mixture of aluminum framing, plastic, and synthetic fabric.

Stroller pricing can vary dramatically between different models.

== Practical considerations ==
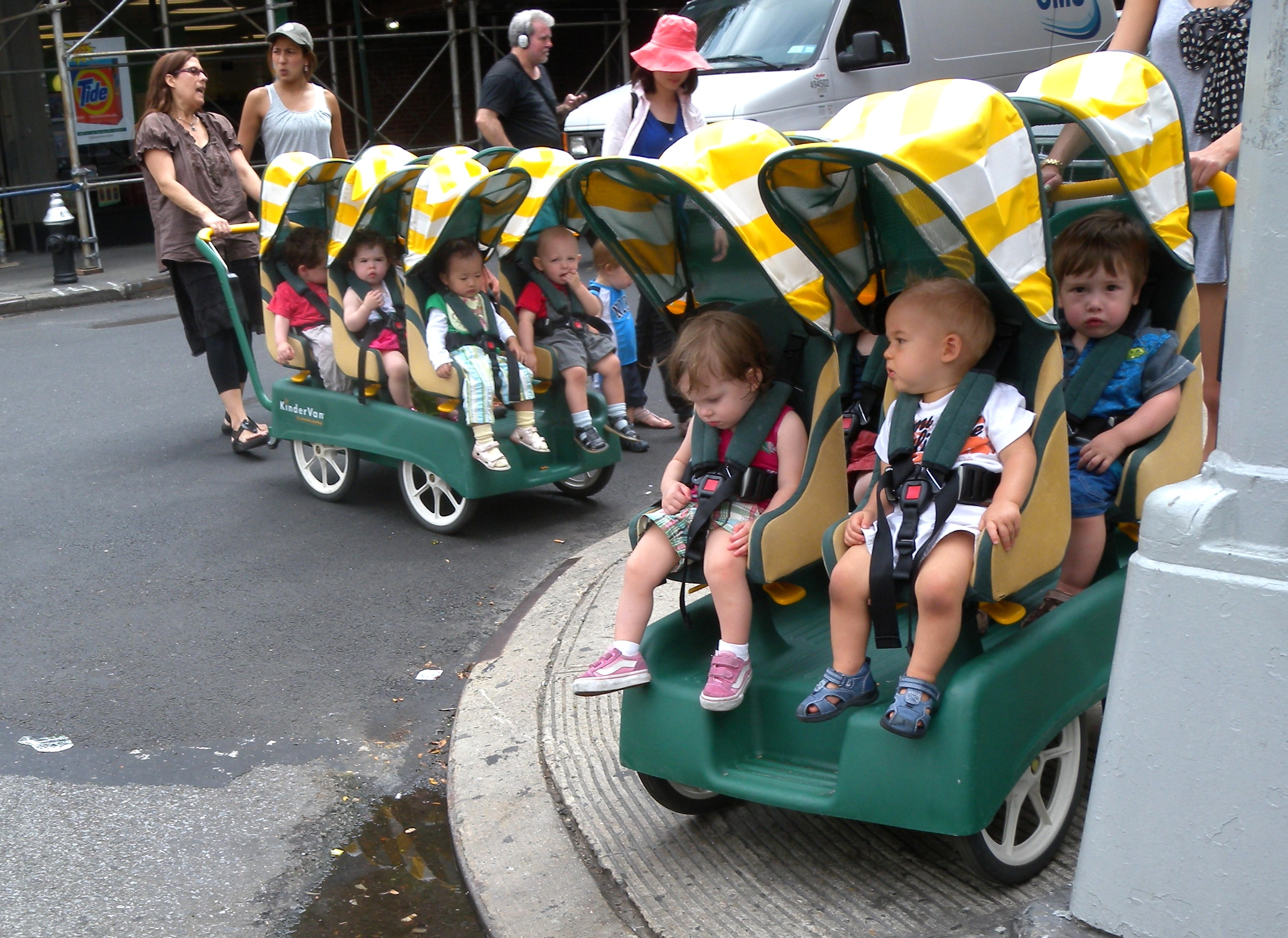
A KinderVan stroller can carry up to six children and is often used in daycares.

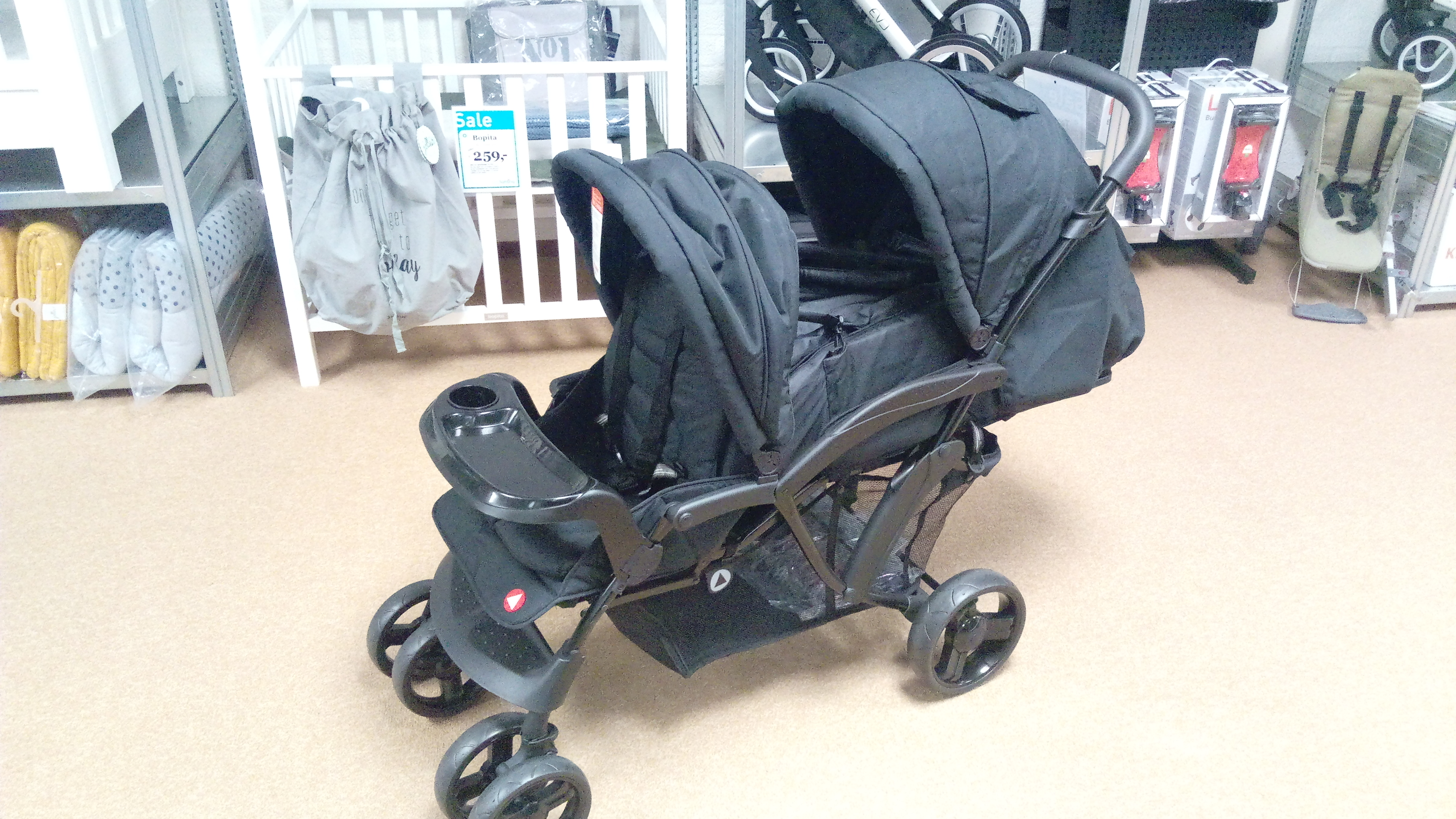
Tandem model

Reasons parents may choose to use a stroller for older children include the storage space for items like diaper bags, to prevent their child from becoming fatigued from walking long distances, or to have a place where their child can nap. Disadvantages to stroller use can include difficulty navigating cramped spaces such as elevators and restaurants, as well as a lack of storage space.

=== Types ===
- Full-size strollers are sturdier than other stroller types and usually have additional storage space, but also tend to be heavier and more expensive.
- Double strollers have two seats for twins, or for carrying both an older and younger sibling together.
- Jogging strollers are lightweight and suitable for parents who like running. These strollers were invented by an American father in the 1980s and were initially a specialized item at sports stores before becoming a mainstream product.
- Umbrella strollers can fold more easily compared to other stroller types, which is useful for transportation and storage.
- Travel strollers are designed to be lightweight and easily movable. They are typically more expensive than umbrella strollers.

== Testing and regulation ==
In Canada, strollers need to complete a set of tests – conducted by Transport Canada and Health Canada – before being sold, a process which can cost the manufacturer up to CA$100,000. In 2009, several models of stroller by Maclaren was recalled in the US and Canada after several reports of children cutting their hands on the stroller's folding mechanism, as well as amputations of children's finger tips.

In 2025, the Competition and Consumer Commission of Singapore (CCS) reported that an average of 140 child injuries were recorded due to various products including strollers in the previous three years. The CCS tests 22 such products and found that 17 of them did not meet the required safety standards.

== Community ==
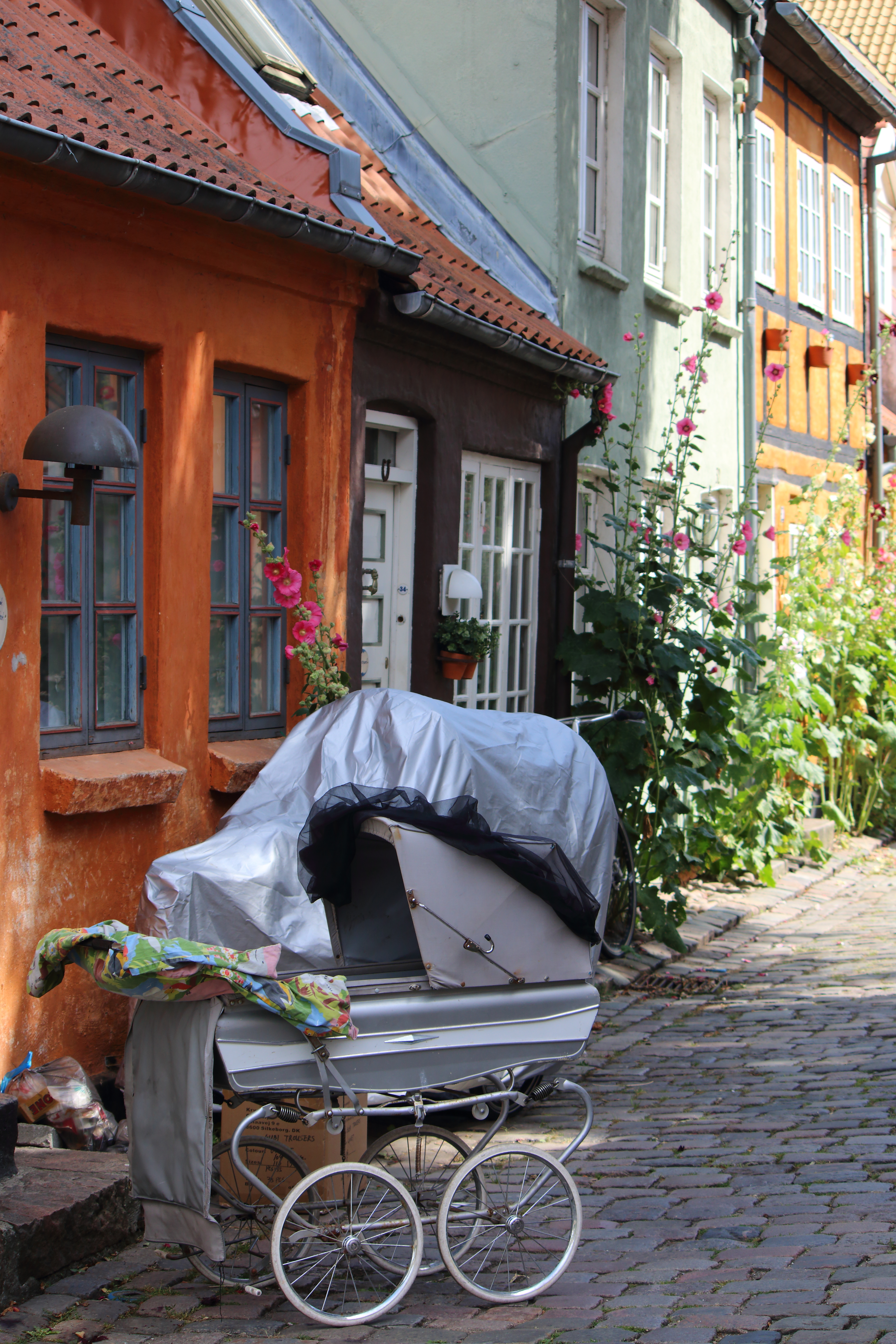
A parked stroller outside a building in Aarhus, Denmark.

While childcare has historically been perceived as women's work, it has become more commonplace for men to use strollers over time. Some parents form stroller clubs with other families for socializing. One organization encourages the creation of such groups across the United States for men specifically so that they can have an environment that is similar to Mom groups to talk about the challenges of fatherhood. These fathers talk to each other on walks while pushing their children in strollers.

In Denmark, it is socially acceptable to leave babies outside in parked strollers due to the perceived health benefits of naps in fresh air. It is common to see multiple strollers lined together while parents are inside cafes or other buildings. In 1997, a Danish mother living in New York City was arrested for leaving her 14 month old child outside in their stroller, who was then temporarily put into foster care. In 2022, a TikTok video depicting strollers outside in Denmark went viral as the practice is considered extremely unusual in the United States.

== See also ==
- Cradleboard
- Curb cut effect
- Momfluencer
- Soccer mom
- Gate check bag
