= Mokobara =

Indian luggage brand

Mokobara Lifestyle Private Limited
- Company type: Private
- Industry: Durable goods
- Founded: 2020; 6 years ago in Bangalore, India
- Founder: Sangeet Agrawal; Navin Parwal
- Headquarters: Bangalore, India
- Area served: India
- Website: https://mokobara.com/

Mokobara is a direct-to-consumer (D2C) luggage and travel accessories brand headquartered in Bangalore, India.

== Establishment ==
Mokobara was founded in 2020 by Urban Ladder executives Sangeet Agrawal and Navin Parwal. The stated objective of Mokobara was to produce a luggage line that would distinguish itself in the market as a brand that laid emphasis on utility. Agrawal and Parwal report that impetus behind the formation of Mokobara was general dissatisfaction with luggage options available in India. In 2020, Mokobara launched its first product, a cabin bag, whose prototype was said to be designed in London and manufactured in China. Shortly after the onset of the COVID-19 pandemic Mokobara faced challenges in expanding brand presence and maintaining investor interest. During this period, the company explored diversifying into hand sanitizer and footwear sales to generate additional revenue streams.

Mokobara was originally launched as an online-only retailer, however, it has since expanded to 14 brick and mortar stores across India.

== Controversies ==
=== Alleged white labelling ===
In 2024, Mokobara was criticized for allegedly reselling inexpensive white-labeled bags at inflated prices. This accusation was said to have originated from Alibaba listings that used Mokobara's images. Mokobara reassured its customers by notifying them with the proof of their intellectual property protected designs and ingenuity. In response to the controversy, Mokobara launched a discount code named "WHITELABEL" with the following caption.

To our Moko fam, this one’s for you. Use code WHITELABEL to get 10% off on originality!

The quote was both received as a witty response to the situation and as an impersonal dismissal to the white labelling concern.

=== Diljit Dosanjh Ad controversy ===
In 2024, Mokobara launched an advertisement featuring Indian singer Diljit Dosanjh to promote their 30-day "no-questions asked" return policy. This ad received backlash for closely resembling a 2016 Carlton Edge advertisement.

=== Trademark litigation ===
In 2025, Mokobara filed a suit against "Greenland" a brand that duplicated Mokobara's distinctive elements of their luggage such as the rectangular shape, color combination, horizontal ridges, etc. The Delhi High Court ordered an interim injunction restricting the defendants from further manufacturing or sale of infringing products.

== Partnerships ==
In 2023, Mokobara partnered with IndiGo airlines and launched the Moko 6E luggage range, which provided IndiGo passengers with excess baggage facilities.

In October 2024, the brand announced Diljit Dosanjh as its brand ambassador.

== See also ==
- Samsonite
- Tumi
- Wildcraft
- American Tourister
