= Pierucci =

Pierucci is an Italian surname. Notable people with the surname include:

- Candice Pierucci, American politician
- Fra Armando Pierucci (born 1935), Franciscan Italian musician
- Fernando Pierucci (born 1979), former Argentine professional football player
- Frédéric Pierucci, (born 1968), former senior manager for Alstom
- Silvana Pierucci (1929–2017), Italian long jumper
- Tomi Pierucci (born 1983), Argentine entrepreneur

== See also ==
- Pier Bucci
- Pucci
