= EBags.com =

Online luggage retailer

eBags
- Type: Public
- Traded as: OTC: SMSEY
- Industry: Retail
- Founded: 1998; 28 years ago
- Defunct: 2024
- Fate: Acquired by Samsonite in 2017 and dissolved by 2024
- Headquarters: Greenwood Village, Colorado, United States
- Key people: Dan Hogan (president & CEO)
- Products: Handbags, luggage, backpacks, laptop bags, duffel bags
- Number of employees: 100+
- Parent: Samsonite
- Website: www.ebags.com

eBags was an online retailer of handbags, luggage, backpacks, laptop bags, and travel accessories that was founded in Greenwood Village, Colorado near Denver. It was acquired by Samsonite in 2017.

Before being acquired by Samsonite in 2017, the main website, eBags.com, carried bags and accessories from hundreds of brands. eBags also operated the eBags Corporate Sales site and offered its own private label products.

During 2020, eBags stopped selling brands not owned by Samsonite. By 2024, Samsonite had closed the eBags website entirely, and reintroduced eBags' popular Mother Lode bags under the Samsonite brand.

== History ==
Jon Nordmark, Peter Cobb, Frank Steed, Andy Youngs, and Eliot Cobb founded eBags in 1998. The website eBags.com launched in 1999, selling seven brands including Samsonite, JanSport, and Skyway luggage. Initial listings focused on luggage, as four of the founders previously worked at Samsonite.

In 2002, eBags.com expanded to operate the website for Tumi, a luxury luggage manufacturer. eBags formed a new division, Global Technology Services (GTS), to operate Tumi.com starting in 2002. International divisions followed for the UK (2005), Germany (2006), and Japan (2006). eBags also operated retail sites for Case Logic, starting in 2005.

eBags.co.uk was launched in 2004, along with a UK satellite office in Cambridge. The UK site closed in December 2008 and the company focus returned to growing the main site, eBags.com.

eBags purchased Shoedini.com in March 2004 and renamed it to 6PM.com in November 2005. 6PM was sold in October 2007 to Zappos.

By February 2016, eBags had sold over 25 million bags, and offered its own private label products under the name The eBags Brand. In April 2017, Samsonite agreed to acquire eBags. The eBags headquarters in Greenwood Village, Colorado were closed in September 2020 and moved to Massachusetts.

As of September 2020, eBags.com retailed products from 5 brands: eBags private label brand, Samsonite, American Tourister, Hartmann, and High Sierra.
