= Samsonite =

Luxembourg luggage manufacturer

Samsonite International S.A.

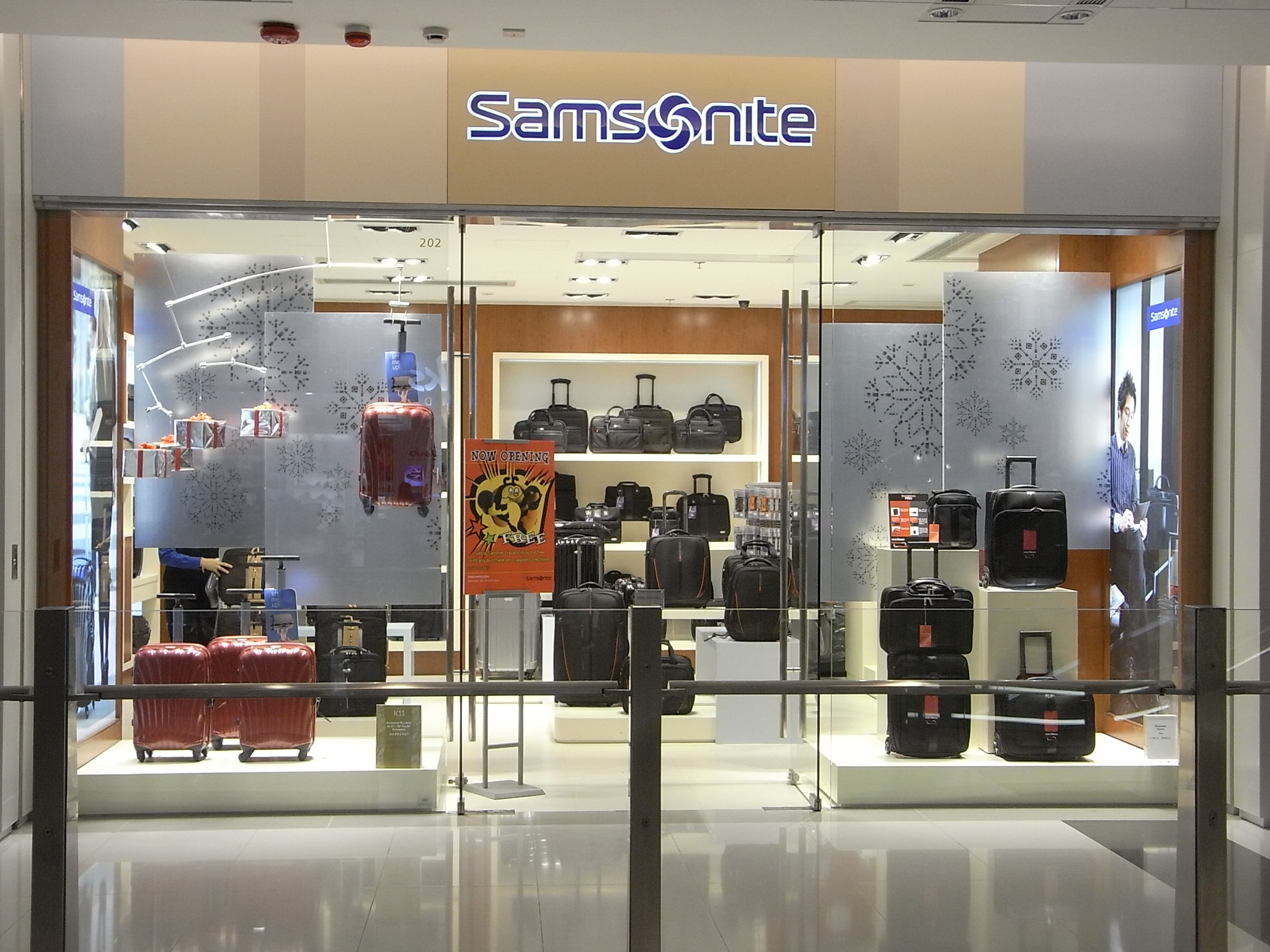
- Samsonite store in Hong Kong
- Formerly: SAMSONITE (1910–66)
- Type: Public
- Traded as: SEHK: 1910
- Founded: 10 March 1910; 116 years ago
- Founder: Jesse Shwayder
- Headquarters: Luxembourg (incorporated, joint headquarters); United States (joint headquarters
- Key people: Timothy Charles Parker (chairman); Kyle Francis Gendreau (CEO)
- Brands: American Tourister; Tumi Inc.; Hartmann Luggage; eBags
- Owner: CVC Capital Partners
- Number of employees: 11,500
- Website: samsonite.com

Samsonite International S.A. is a Luxembourg-based multinational luggage manufacturer and retailer, with products ranging from large suitcases to small toiletries, bags and briefcases. The company was founded in 1910 in Denver, Colorado, United States.

Its jointed headquarters are in Luxembourg and the United States and it is listed on the Hong Kong Stock Exchange.

== History ==
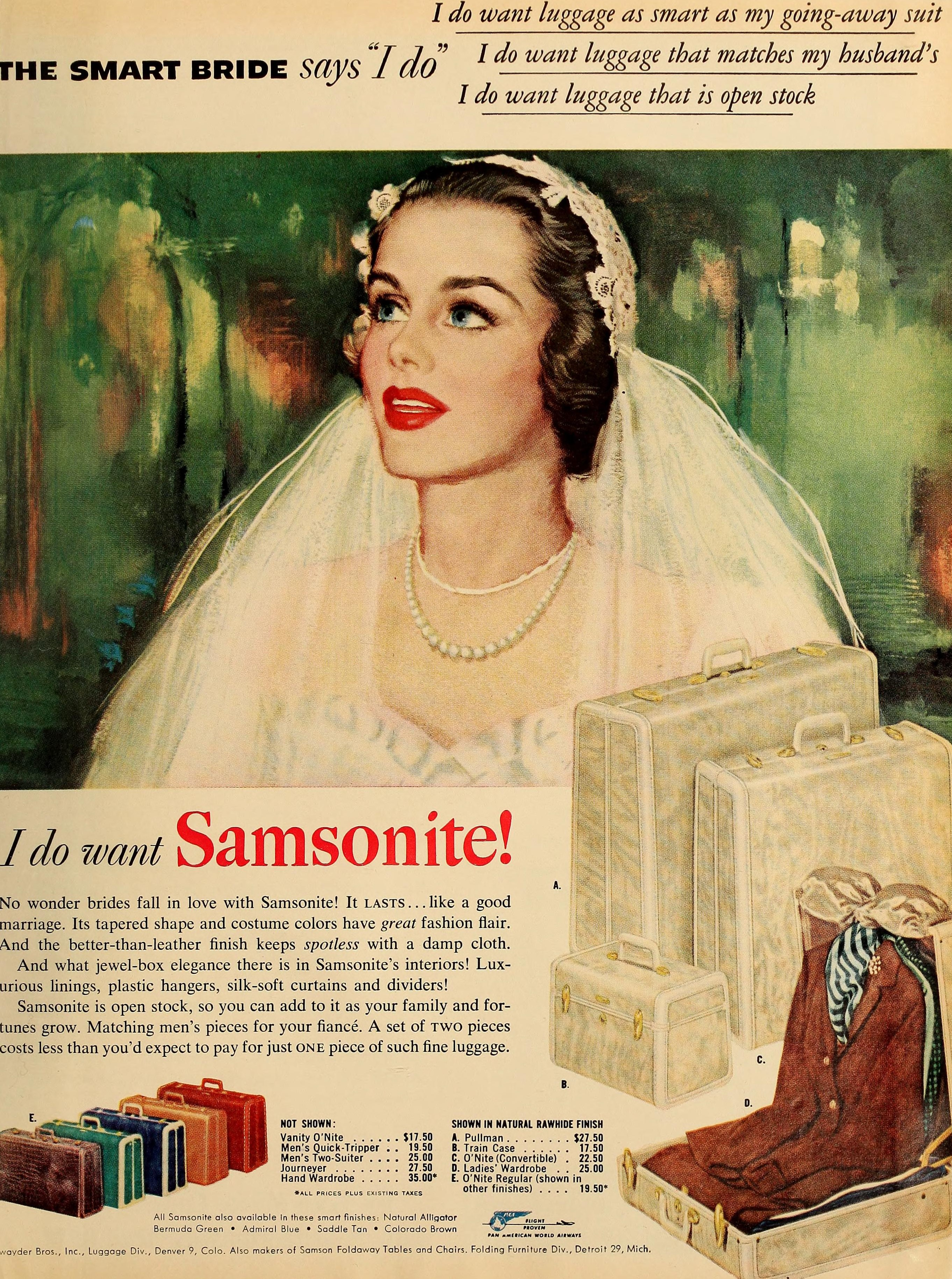
A 1953 ad for Samsonite

The company was founded in Denver, Colorado, on March 10, 1910, by Black Hawk, Colorado-born luggage salesman Jesse Shwayder (1882–1970) as the Shwayder Trunk Manufacturing Company. A religious man, Shwayder named one of his initial cases Samson, after the Biblical strongman, and began using the trademark Samsonite in 1941 for its tapered vulcanized fiber suitcase, introduced in 1939. In 1965, after the Samsonite suitcase became its best-selling product, the company changed its name to SAMSONITE. For many years the subsidiary SAMSONITE Furniture Co. made folding chairs and card tables in Murfreesboro, Tennessee.

The Shwayder family sold the company to Beatrice Foods in 1973. In 1974, the company released the brand's first wheeled suitcase.

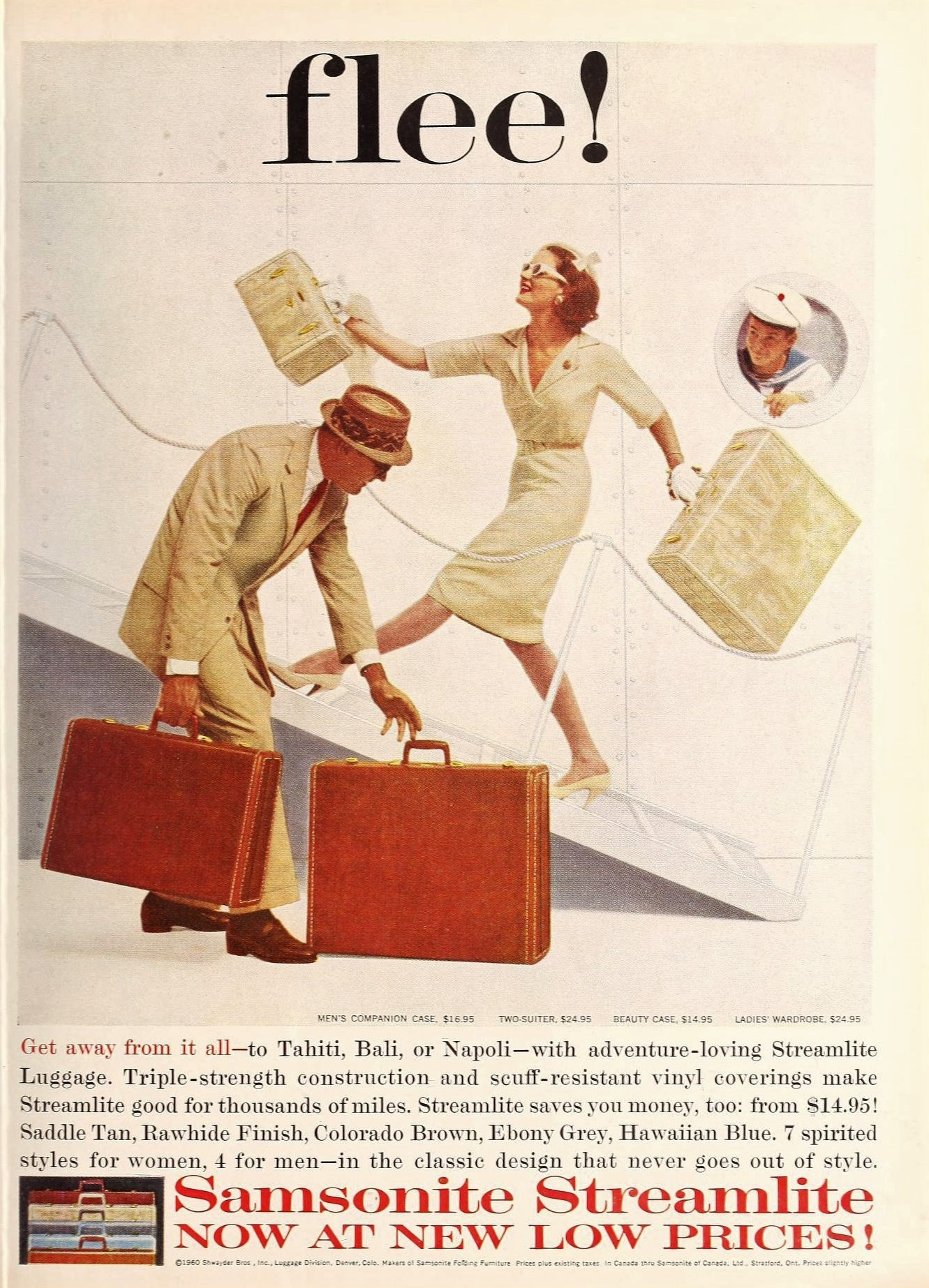
A 1960 ad for Samsonite

Samsonite operated with relative independence within Beatrice until 1986, when Samsonite was sold to Kohlberg Kravis Roberts. Subsequently, in the 1980s, and into the 1990s, Samsonite went through multiple ownership changes. Forbes Magazine states that "the company spent most of the 1980s and 1990s in turmoil amidst multiple handoffs." First, Samsonite was spun off from KKR as part of E-II, which came under the control of Fortune Brands. E-II went through bankruptcy and was renamed Astrum International. In 1993, Astrum purchased American Tourister luggage, complementing Samsonite. In 1995, Astrum split, and an independent Samsonite (now including American Tourister) was once again headquartered in Denver. The Denver factory, which employed 4,000 people at its peak, closed in May 2001.

After a change of ownership in May 2005, Samsonite's headquarters moved from Denver to Mansfield, Massachusetts. Effective September 1, 2005, Samsonite then moved its U.S. marketing and sales offices from Warren, Rhode Island, to Mansfield, Massachusetts.

In 2005, the company was acquired by a consortium of Private Equity funds including Bain Capital, Ares Management and the Ontario Pension Fund in order to pull the company out of a long slump..

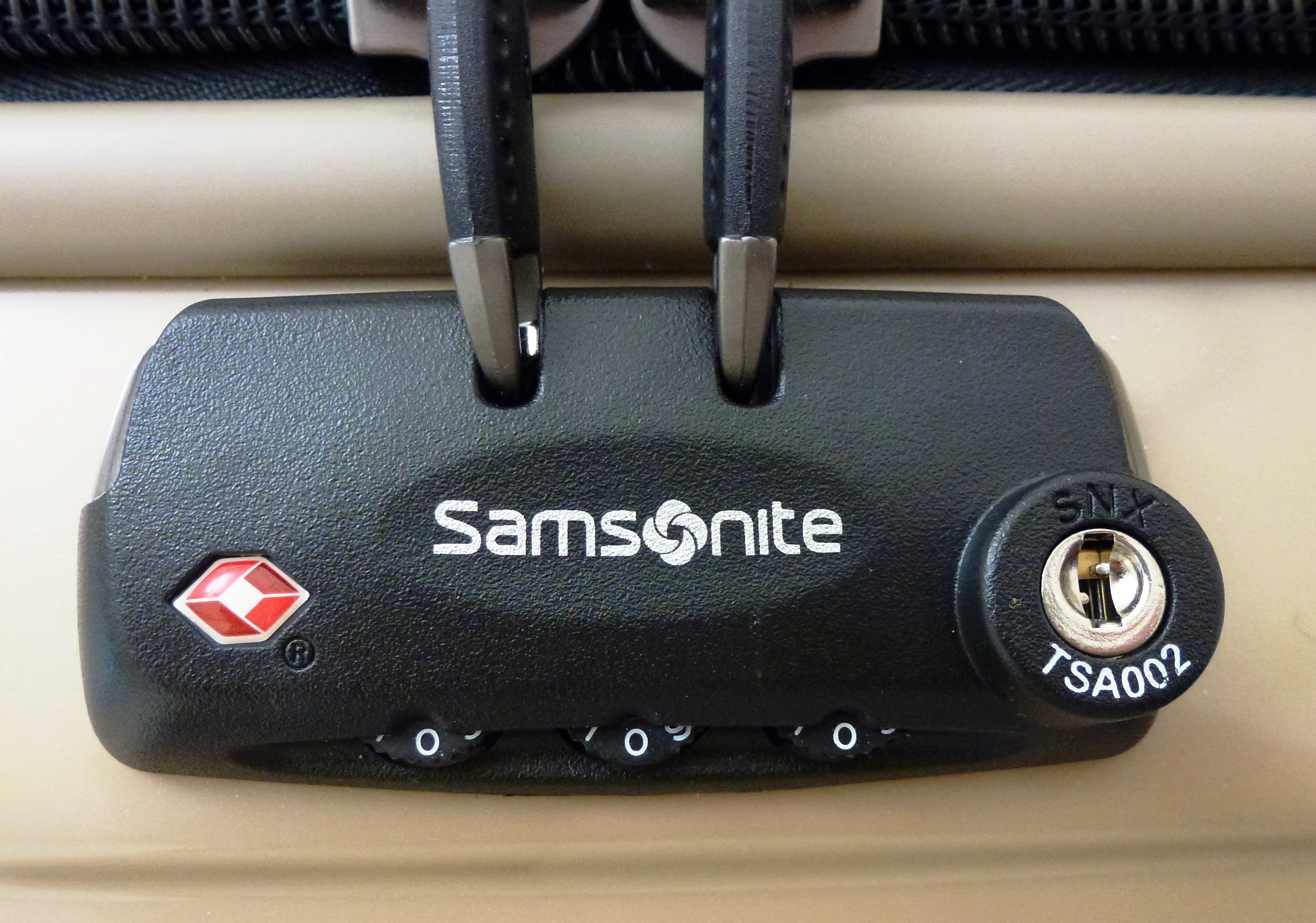
Luggage lock

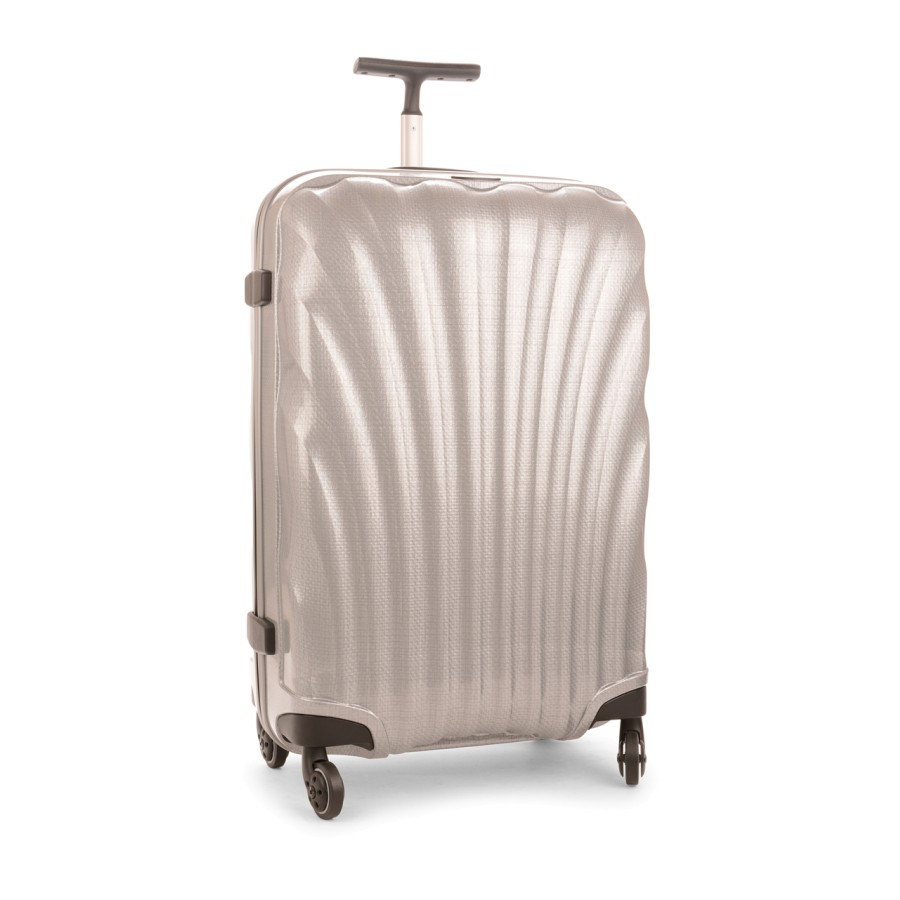
Samsonite Cosmolite suitcase in silver

In July 2007, private equity firm CVC Capital Partners took over Samsonite for $1.7 billion. CVC Capital Partners Ltd. became Samsonite's fifth owner in 21 years.

On September 2, 2009, Samsonite Company Store LLC (U.S. retail division), formally known as Samsonite Company Stores Inc., filed for Chapter 11 bankruptcy. It planned to close up to 50% of its stores and discontinue the "Black Label" brand in the United States.

In June 2011, Samsonite raised $1.25 billion in an initial public offering in Hong Kong.

In August 2012, Samsonite paid $35 million in cash to buy the high-end luggage brand Hartmann, which was founded in 1877.

In June 2014, Samsonite agreed to buy technical outdoor backpack brand Gregory Mountain Products from Black Diamond, Inc., for $85 million in cash.

In March 2016, Samsonite agreed to buy luxury baggage maker Tumi Inc. for $1.8 billion in its largest ever acquisition.

In April 2017, Samsonite agreed to acquire eBags.com for $105 million in cash.

In 2023, Samsonite was rated the best overall luggage for travelers by Good Housekeeping Magazine.

In September 2023, Bloomberg reported that Samsonite was exploring the possibility of a second listing in the U.S. as the luggage maker looked to broaden its investor base.

In August 2026, Samsonite acquired an 85% stake in the luggage brand Béis, founded by Shay Mitchell in a $178.5 million deal.

== Toy manufacture ==
Beginning in 1961, Samsonite manufactured and distributed Lego building toys for the North American market under license from the Lego Group. A licensing dispute ended the arrangement in the U.S. in 1972, but Samsonite remained the distributor in Canada until 1986. Albert H. Reckler, then head of military and export sales for the luggage division, brought the idea of manufacturing and selling Lego in the U.S. to Samsonite. He and Stan A. Clamage were instrumental in establishing the Lego brand in the United States. This was part of an overall company expansion into toy manufacturing in the 1960s that was abandoned in the 1970s.

== Production ==
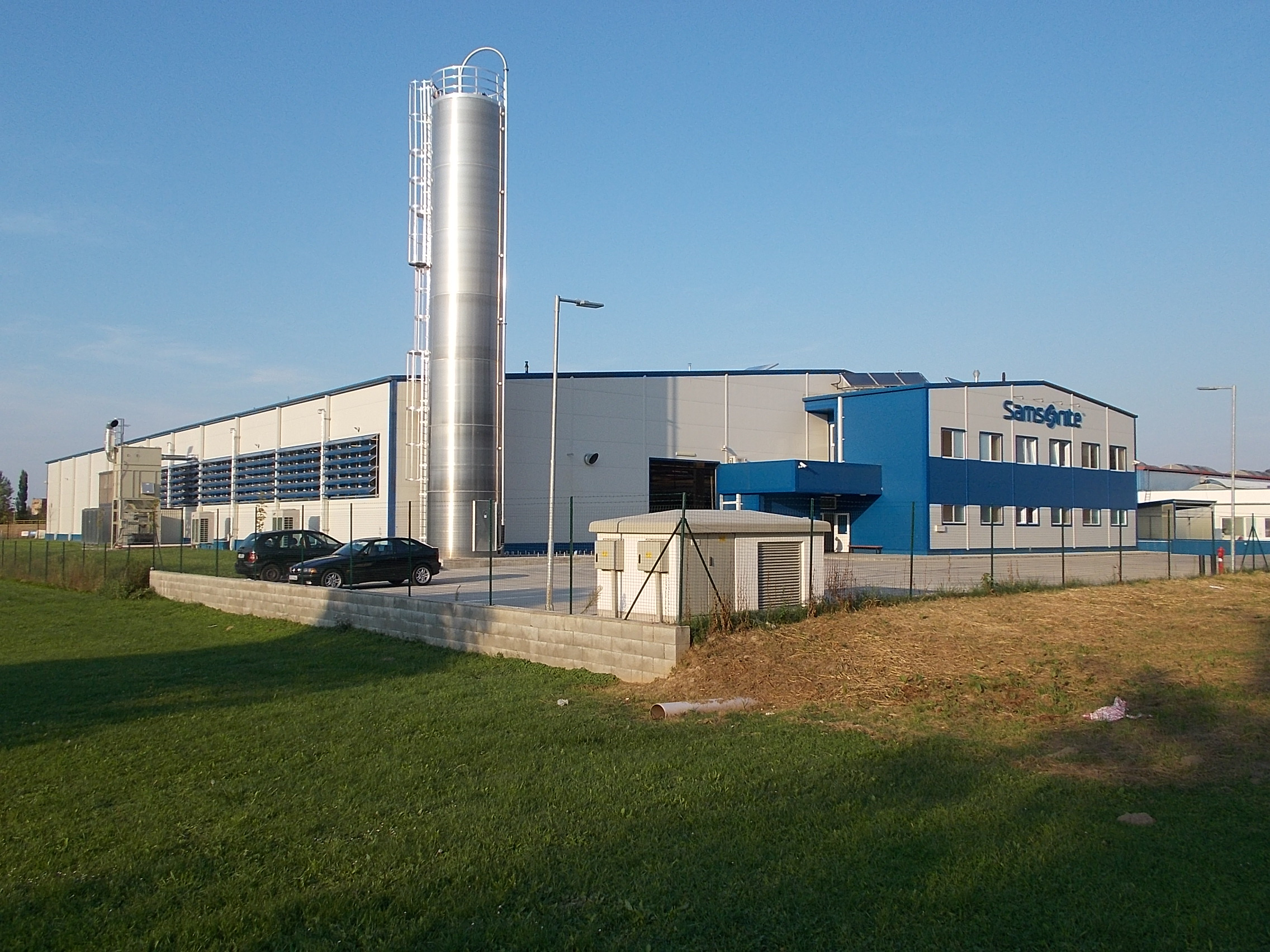
Samsonite factory in Szekszard, Hungary, in 2016

In 2008, 40% of all Samsonite hard luggage was manufactured at its plant in Nashik, India.

Samsonite has two assembly plants in Hungary.

In 2022, Samsonite announced plans to move production to Japan.

In April 2023, Samsonite announced plans to expand its manufacturing in Nashik as the demand for travel has increased. Samsonite India plans to invest ₹1.1–1.15 billion to enhance its hard luggage manufacturing capacity from 500,000 pieces a month to 750,000 pieces by the end of the following year. The expansion will include 180,000 square feet of land for the plant to expand on.

== Brands ==
- American Tourister
- eBags
- Gregory Mountain Product
- Hartmann Luggage
- High Sierra
- Kamiliant
- Lipault
- Samsonite
- Tumi Inc.

== Competitors ==
- Delsey
- Red Oxx Manufacturing
- VIP Industries
- Briggs & Riley
- Mokobara
