= CD Comarca de Níjar =

Comarca de Níjar
- Full name: Club Deportivo Comarca de Níjar
- Founded: 2000
- Dissolved: 2015
- Ground: Comarca de Níjar, Níjar, Spain
- Capacity: 2,850
- President: (Spain) Antonio Jesús Rodríguez
- Head coach: (Spain) Víctor Mañas
- 2014–15: Segunda Andaluza Almería, 3rd of 19
| Home colours | Away colours |

Club Deportivo Comarca de Níjar was a football team based in Níjar, Spain. Founded in 2000, they were dissolved in 2015. The club's home ground is Estadio Municipal Comarca de Níjar with 850 seats.

== History ==
Former shield

The club was founded in 2000 as Asociación Deportiva Comarca de Níjar, through a merger between UD San Isidro de Níjar & Campohermoso Balompié. AD Comarca de Níjar was used only for 2000–01 season, and the club switched name to Club Deportivo Comarca de Níjar.

In 2015, Comarca de Níjar was dissolved, with a phoenix club named Club Unión Deportiva Comarca de Níjar being created shortly after.

== Season to season ==
| Season | Tier | Division | Place | Copa del Rey |
|---|---|---|---|---|
| 2000–01 | 5 | Reg. Pref. | 4th | |
| 2001–02 | 5 | Reg. Pref. | 1st | |
| 2002–03 | 4 | 3ª | 5th | |
| 2003–04 | 4 | 3ª | 8th | |
| 2004–05 | 4 | 3ª | 6th | |
| 2005–06 | 4 | 3ª | 16th | |
| 2006–07 | 4 | 3ª | 13th | |
| 2007–08 | 4 | 3ª | 10th | |

| Season | Tier | Division | Place | Copa del Rey |
|---|---|---|---|---|
| 2008–09 | 4 | 3ª | 6th | |
| 2009–10 | 4 | 3ª | 7th | |
| 2010–11 | 4 | 3ª | 1st | |
| 2011–12 | 4 | 3ª | 6th | First round |
| 2012–13 | 4 | 3ª | 20th | |
| 2013–14 | 5 | 1ª And. | 18th | |
| 2014–15 | 6 | 2ª And. | 3rd | |

- 10 seasons in Tercera División

== Former players ==
- (Argentina) Fernando Pierucci
- (Dominican Republic) Edwin Muñoz
- (Equatorial Guinea) Sena
- (San Marino) Michele Marani
