= Jorzolino Falkenstein =

Dutch footballer (born 1988)

Personal information
- Full name: Jorzolino Anthony Ray Falkenstein
- Date of birth: 26 November 1988 (age 37)
- Place of birth: Rotterdam, Netherlands
- Height: 1.72 m (5 ft 8 in)
- Position: Striker

Team information
- Current team: HVV Helmond

Youth career
- 1994–1999: Rood-Wit '62
- 1999–2003: Helmond Sport
- 2003–2006: Mierlo-Hout

Senior career*
Years	Team	Apps	(Gls)
2010–2011	Capelle	25	(2)
2011–2012	Barendrecht	27	(3)
2012–2013	Gemert	27	(12)
2013–2015	FC Oss	54	(8)
2015–2016	Crevillente		
2016–2017	FC Oss	14	(1)
2017–2018	Rayo Cantabria	5	(0)
2018–2020	Civitanovese		
2020–2021	Wezel Sport		
2021–2023	Gemert	59	(4)
2023	OJC Rosmalen	0	(0)
2023	Civitanovese		
- * Club domestic league appearances and goals as of 13:46, 27 December 2023 (UTC)

Jorzolino Falkenstein (born 26 November 1988) is a Dutch professional footballer who plays as a striker for amateur side HVV Helmond.

== Club career ==
Falkenstein played as a striker in the Helmond Sport academy and for FC Oss in the Dutch Eerste Divisie before moving to Spanish fourth-tier club Crevillente Deportivo after a trial at third level FC Cartagena did not work out. He returned to Oss in 2016

In the latter part of his career, he ventured into lower-level football in Italy and Belgium, including a two-year period at VV Gemert in the Derde Divisie, where he had previously played earlier in his career. In 2023, he reunited with the Italian Eccellenza side Civitanovese, where he had previously been part of the team from 2018 to 2020.

He later played for Montemilone Pollenza ASD and CHC Den Bosch before joining HVV Helmond in summer 2026.
