= Deportivo Rayo Cantabria =

Rayo Cantabria
- Full name: Deportivo Rayo Cantabria
- Founded: 1993
- Dissolved: 2018
- Ground: Campo Municipal Mies de Cozada, Santander, Cantabria, Spain
- Capacity: 1,000
- President: (Spain) Dionisio González
- Head coach: (Spain) Fernando Tejerina
- 2017–18: 3ª – Group 3, 11th (administratively relegated)
| Home colours | Away colours |

Deportivo Rayo Cantabria was a Spanish football team based in Santander, in the autonomous community of Cantabria. Founded in 1993 it last played in Tercera División – Group 3, holding home games at the Campo Municipal Mies de Cozada sports ground, which they share with a Segunda Regional football side (Juventud Atlético San Román) and a División de Honor rugby club (Independiente Rugby Club). Before they played at the Campos de San Juan de Monte.

== History ==
The original Rayo Cantabria was founded in 1926 as Gimnástica de Miranda, later being renamed Sociedad Deportiva Rayo Cantabria and acting as Racing de Santander's farm team from 1951. The club spent 20 consecutive years in the old Tercera División when it was the third tier of Spanish football, then dropped down the levels, competing for just one further season at that level (Segunda División B) after restructuring – that was in 1987–88, and they were relegated. In 1993, the original Rayo was dissolved in a national move to formally absorb affiliated teams into the professional clubs' structure, and Racing de Santander B took its place.

The new Deportivo Rayo Cantabria, who started playing as an independent club in the regional leagues from 1993, was also affiliated to Racing four seasons, from 2003–04 to 2006–07. The reformed Rayo have never achieved promotion to Segunda B, although they took part in the promotion playoffs three times (having finished ahead of Racing B in the table each time).

The club was excluded from competing in the 2018–19 Tercera División due to unpaid debts, and did not enter any competitions in 2019–20 either. In their absence, in summer 2019 Racing de Santander successfully applied to have their B-team renamed as Rayo Cantabria going forward.

In September 2018, despite the recent problems at the club, chief executive Ángel Meñaca was recognised by the city of Santander for his lifetime efforts and contributions towards the running both the 'original' Rayo up to 1993 and the new Rayo from then on.

== Season to season ==
| Season | Tier | Division | Place | Copa del Rey |
|---|---|---|---|---|
| 1993–94 | 6 | 1ª Reg. | 5th | |
| 1994–95 | 6 | 1ª Reg. | 4th | |
| 1995–96 | 6 | 1ª Reg. | 1st | |
| 1996–97 | 5 | Reg. Pref. | 6th | |
| 1997–98 | 5 | Reg. Pref. | 11th | |
| 1998–99 | 5 | Reg. Pref. | 10th | |
| 1999–2000 | 5 | Reg. Pref. | 4th | |
| 2000–01 | 4 | 3ª | 12th | |
| 2001–02 | 4 | 3ª | 17th | |
| 2002–03 | 4 | 3ª | 9th | |
| 2003–04 | 4 | 3ª | 6th | |
| 2004–05 | 5 | Reg. Pref. | 4th | |
| 2005–06 | 5 | Reg. Pref. | 6th | |

| Season | Tier | Division | Place | Copa del Rey |
|---|---|---|---|---|
| 2006–07 | 5 | Reg. Pref. | 2nd | |
| 2007–08 | 5 | Reg. Pref. | 2nd | |
| 2008–09 | 4 | 3ª | 14th | |
| 2009–10 | 4 | 3ª | 6th | |
| 2010–11 | 4 | 3ª | 2nd | |
| 2011–12 | 4 | 3ª | 8th | |
| 2012–13 | 4 | 3ª | 2nd | |
| 2013–14 | 4 | 3ª | 3rd | |
| 2014–15 | 4 | 3ª | 5th | |
| 2015–16 | 4 | 3ª | 5th | |
| 2016–17 | 4 | 3ª | 17th | |
| 2017–18 | 4 | 3ª | 10th | |

- 14 seasons in Tercera División

== Famous players ==
- (Equatorial Guinea) Iván Bolado
- (Haiti) Mikaël Cantave
- (Netherlands) Jorzolino Falkenstein
- (Slovenia) Saša Kolman
- (Dominican Republic) Edwin Muñoz
- (Dominican Republic) Yefri Reyes

== Related teams ==
- Racing de Santander B
