= Sena (footballer) =

Equatoguinean footballer (born 1978)

Personal information
- Full name: José Luis Senobua García
- Date of birth: 16 September 1978 (age 48)
- Place of birth: Almería, Spain
- Height: 1.79 m (5 ft 10 in)
- Position: Midfielder

Youth career
- 1986–1996: Los Molinos

Senior career*
Years	Team	Apps	(Gls)
1996–2000	Almería B		
1997–2001	Almería	57	(4)
1998	→ Roquetas (loan)	?	(1)
2001–2002	Mar Menor		
2002	Mármol Macael		
2003	Zuera	2	(0)
2003–2004	Santa Brígida	?	(1)
2004	Teruel	10	(0)
2005	Pinatar	14	(1)
2005–2006	Comarca Níjar	11	(0)
2006–2007	Adra	18	(0)

International career
2003	Equatorial Guinea	1	(0)

Managerial career
- 2018–20??: Oriente (assistant)
- 20??–: Huércal Juvenil
- * Club domestic league appearances and goals

José Luis Senobua García (born 16 September 1978), commonly known as Sena, is a football manager and former player who is currently managing CD Huércal youth team. He played as a midfielder and spent most of his playing career in Tercera División clubs. Born and raised in Spain to an Equatoguinean father and a Spanish mother, he capped for the Equatorial Guinea national team.

== Club career ==
Born in Almería, Andalusia, Sena finished his formation in Los Molinos CF's youth setup, and made his senior debuts with UD Almería B, playing several seasons in the regional leagues. On 25 January 1997, aged only 18, he made his first team debut, starting in a 1–1 away draw against UD Las Palmas in the Segunda División.

Sena alternated between both reserve and main squads during his spell, only appearing regularly with the latter in the 2000–01 campaign, in Segunda División B. He subsequently resumed his career appearing mainly in the fourth level but also in the regional leagues, representing CD Roquetas, AD Mar Menor-San Javier, Mármol Macael CD, Pinatar CF, UD Villa de Santa Brígida, CD Zuera, CD Teruel, AD Comarca de Níjar and AD Adra, retiring with the latter in 2007.

== International career ==
Sena was called to the Spanish U-18 national team, although he never got to make debut in an official match. As his father is a Bubi from Malabo, in 2003, he was called up to the Equatorial Guinea national team, along with several other Spanish-born players of Equatoguinean descent.

He made his debut in a 0–1 loss against Morocco at the 2004 African Cup of Nations qualifiers on 6 July 2003. This was his only appearance in the national team.

== Personal life ==
Sena's cousin Kike, is also a footballer. A forward, he too was groomed at Almería's youth system.
