= Edwin Muñoz =

Dominican-Spanish footballer

Personal information
- Full name: Edwin Giovanni Muñoz Rubio
- Date of birth: 6 June 1993 (age 33)
- Place of birth: Paraíso, Barahona, Dominican Republic
- Height: 1.65 m (5 ft 5 in)
- Position: Right back

Youth career
- 2009–2010: Zapillo Atlético
- 2010–2012: Los Molinos

Senior career*
Years	Team	Apps	(Gls)
2011–2012	Los Molinos	16	(0)
2011	→ Carboneras (loan)	8	(0)
2011	→ Atlético Bellavista (loan)	1	(0)
2012–2013	Comarca de Níjar	34	(2)
2013–2014	Huércal	33	(1)
2014–2015	Utiel	31	(0)
2015	Comarca Mármol	17	(0)
2016	Atlántico	?	(?)
2016	Torre Levante	1	(0)
2017	Moca	0	(0)
2017	Rayo Cantabria	2	(0)
2018	Atlántico		
2019	Atlético de San Francisco		

International career^{‡}
2016–	Dominican Republic	3	(0)
- * Club domestic league appearances and goals as of 8 October 2023 ‡ National team caps and goals as of 29 March 2016

Edwin Giovanni Muñoz Rubio (born 6 June 1993) is a Dominican footballer who plays for Rayo Cantabria and the Dominican Republic national team as a right back. He also holds Spanish citizenship.

== Club career ==
Born in Paraíso, Barahona, Muñoz played as a youth for Spanish lower sides Zapillo Atlético and Los Molinos CF. He made his senior debuts for the latter on 6 March 2011 during the 2010–11 campaign, in the regional leagues.

In September 2011, Los Molinos loaned Muñoz to UD Carboneras, in Tercera División. After eight matches played with them, he returned to Los Molinos, that loaned him again, this time to regional side Atlético Bellavista, where he played just once, deciding to come back to Los Molinos and complete the 2011–12 season there.

From the 2012–13 season until his arrival in the Dominican Football League in 2016, Muñoz was a regular player in Spanish Tercera División, playing a total of 115 matches and scoring 3 goals, for CD Comarca de Níjar, CD Huércal, CD Utiel and CD Comarca del Mármol. After his Dominican Republic experience with Atlántico FC, he went back to Spain, signing for CF Torre Levante in late November 2016.

== International career ==
Muñoz made his international debut for Dominican Republic on 26 March 2016, starting in a 1–2 loss against Curaçao for the 2017 Caribbean Cup qualification. He played three days later against Barbados.
