= Delsey =

Travel accessory manufacturer

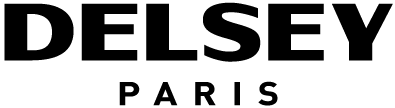
- Type: Société Anonyme
- Industry: Luggage
- Founded: 1946 (in France)
- Founder: Emil Delahaye & André & Walter Seynhaeve
- Headquarters: Tremblay-en-France (France)
- Area served: Worldwide
- Key people: Guenther Trieb (CEO)
- Website: www.delsey.com

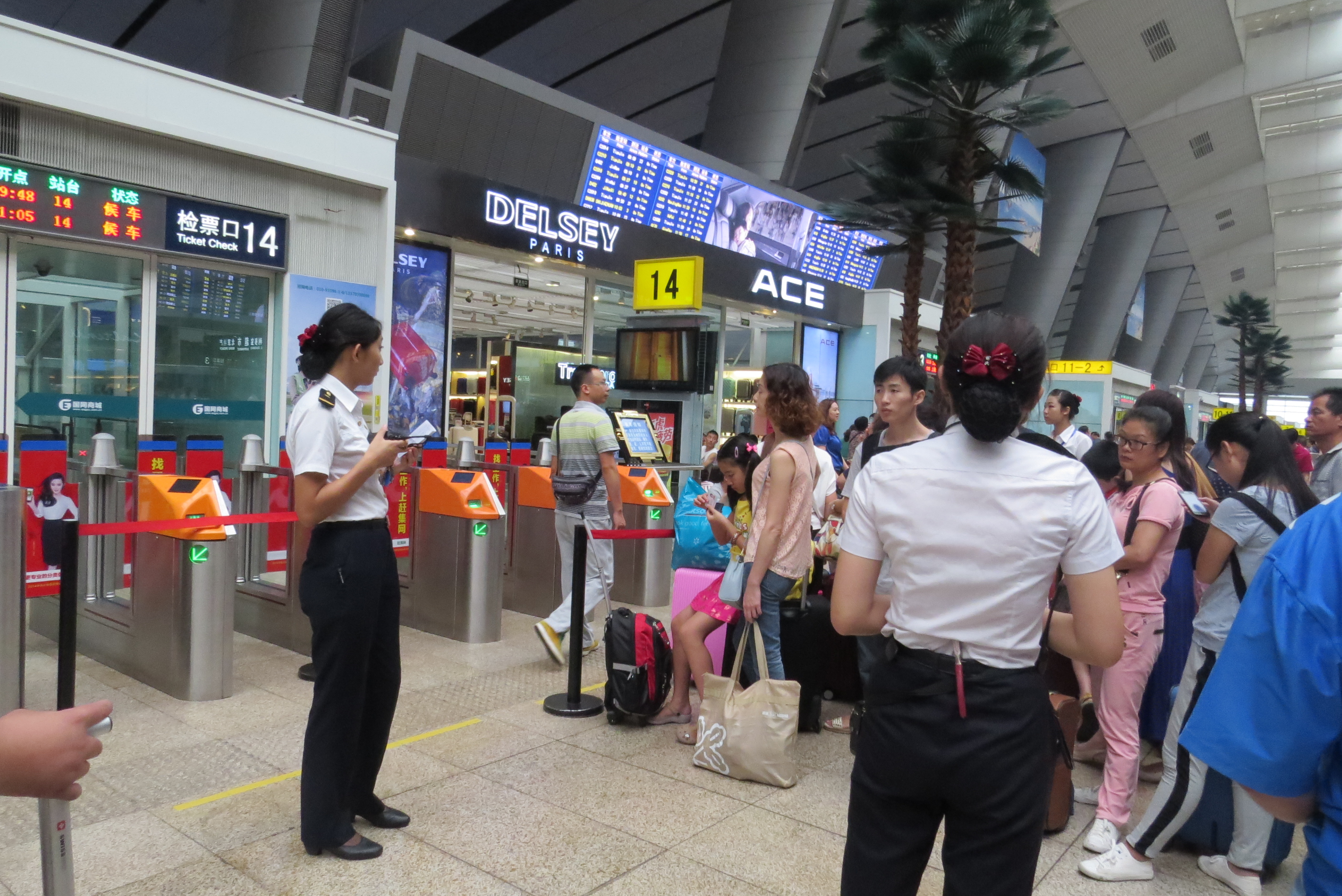
A Delsey store in Beijing South railway station.

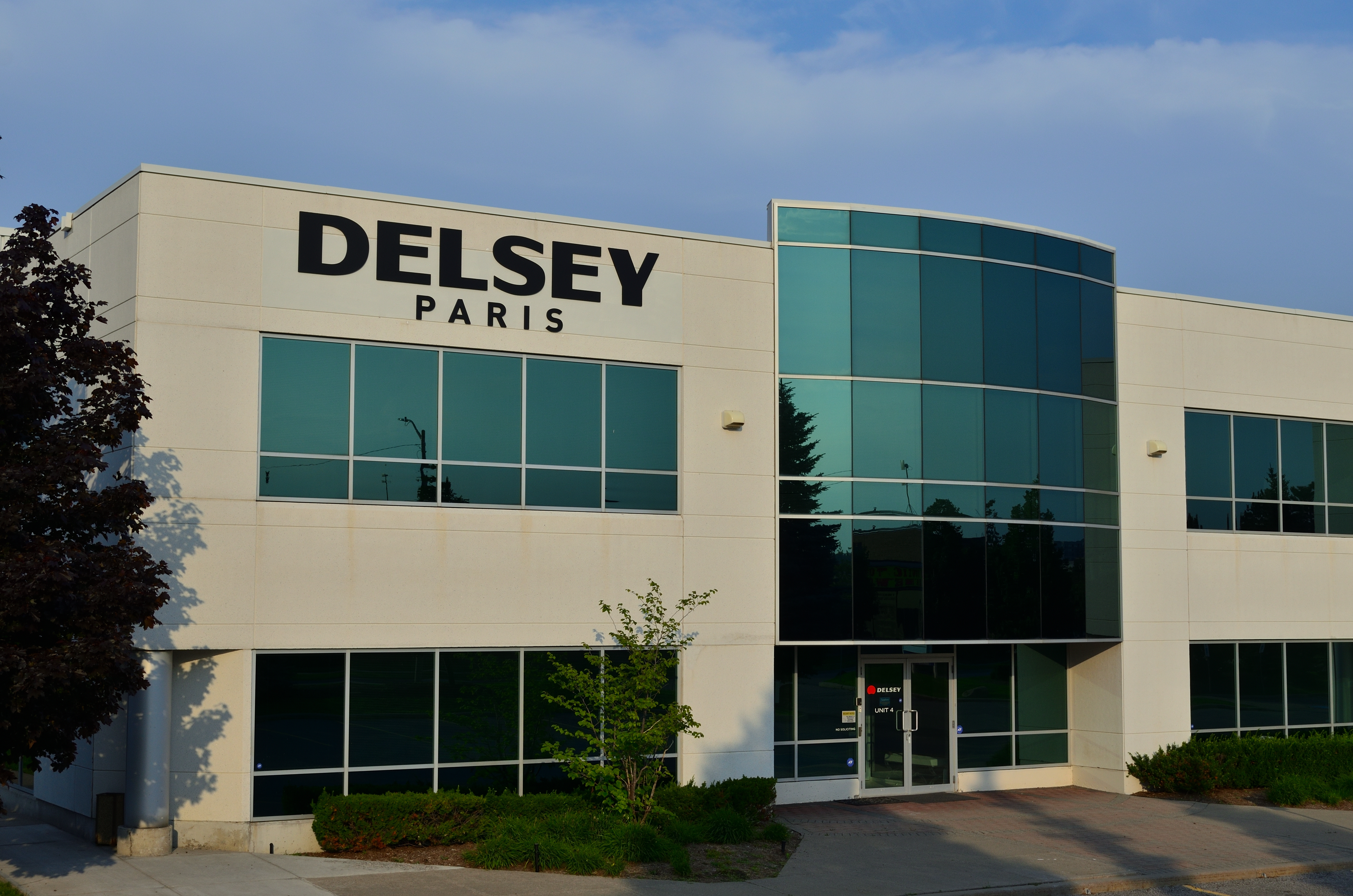
Delsey office in North America

Delsey (French pronunciation: [delsɛː]) is a French company that manufactures luggage and travel accessories. It is based in Tremblay-en-France, in the suburbs of Paris. Delsey employs 400 people, and has a turnover of about €130 million. As of 2010, it was the world's second-largest luggage manufacturer after Samsonite.

== History ==
In 1911, the Établissements Delahaye specialised in the manufacture of cases for cameras and covered cases for typewriters and record players. Émile Delahaye and the Seynhaeve brothers joined forces in 1946, combining their names to create the Delsey brand. Delsey made use of its experience in the production of camera and record player cases to form a department specializing in travel items in moulded plastic.

== Innovations ==
In early 2015, Delsey unveiled a prototype "smart suitcase" called Pluggage, containing built-in electronic gadgets which communicate with a smartphone app. Features include a weighing scale, locator beacon, wireless speaker, remote locking, and phone charger. This is similar to the competing Airbus Bag2Go and Bluesmart cases which are being developed at the same time as Delsey's product.

== Competition ==
- Samsonite
- VIP Bags
