= Hartmann Luggage =

American manufacturer

- Industry: Luggage
- Founded: 1877, Milwaukee, Wisconsin
- Founder: Joseph S. Hartmann
- Parent: Samsonite
- Website: https://shop.hartmann.com/

Hartmann Luggage is a manufacturer of luggage and leather goods established in 1877 in Milwaukee, Wisconsin by Bavarian trunkmaker Joseph S. Hartmann.

Hartmann luggage has been recognized as being of fine quality. The company is known for producing distinctive collections of luggage such as Wings and Tweed, which are associated with traditional American style. Many of its products were manufactured in the United States and are now outsourced globally, but mostly China and other parts of Asia. The Tweed Collection was updated & re-named Tweed Legend in 2018.

The Associated Press published on September 1, 2007:

"Hartmann Luggage spokesman Ronald Roberts said the manufacturing operation will be moved outside the U.S. We'll be working with the Caribbean, Central America and China".

== History ==
Hartmann’s manufacturing began in the fourth ward of Milwaukee, Wisconsin, in January of 1875. Originally named Carpeles, Heiser & Co., co-owners Philip Carpeles and John Heiser erected a 4-story building on Sixth Street for the purpose of manufacturing luggage. They employed 50 employees and owned 2 retail stores to sell their luggage. In March of 1880, Jacob Herr was contracted to build a second building on Sixth St., between Wells and Cedar Streets.

In September 1881, John Heiser severed his partnership and left the firm and Joseph S. Hartmann entered as a partner. In January 1883, the firm was renamed Carpeles, Schram & Co., adding Philip's son-in-law Bernhard Schram as a third partner. In December 1885, Schram left the firm and it was reestablished as Carpeles, Hartmann & Co.

In October 1890, Hartmann officially left the company and filed articles of incorporation for the Hartmann & Puffer Trunk Co. in Racine, with partners Elmer C. Puffer and Edmund C. Dean.

In 1956, the company opened a manufacturing operation in Lebanon, Tennessee, and the company's headquarters and plant facilities followed in 1959.

Hartmann was bought by Brown Forman Corporation in 1983. Hartman was positioned within Brown Forman’s then‑diversified consumer durables portfolio alongside Lenox. Brown Forman later exited non‑beverage businesses and sold Hartmann to equity firm Clarion Capital Partners in 2007.

Samsonite International acquired Hartmann from Clarion in May 2012 in an all‑cash transaction valued at USD $35 million, integrating the brand into Samsonite’s multi‑brand portfolio with plans to expand distribution and revitalize product and retail presentation. Following the acquisition the Factory and Head Office in Lebanon, TN, closed in December 2012.
