= Bluesmart =

Travel technology company

Bluesmart Inc.
- Type: Private
- Industry: Smart Luggage
- Founded: 2013; 13 years ago
- Founders: Tomi Pierucci, Diego Saez-Gil, Alejo Verlini
- Defunct: May 1, 2018; 8 years ago
- Headquarters: New York City, United States
- Area served: Worldwide
- Website: bluesmart.com

Bluesmart Inc. was a global travel technology company that developed and produced Internet of Things travel products. The brand launched a carry-on suitcase, the Bluesmart One, on the crowdfunding website Indiegogo in 2014. The campaign raised US$2.2 million in contributions and became the highest crowdfunding project ever for a travel product at that time.

On May 1, 2018, Bluesmart Inc. announced they would be shutting down operations, due to a ban by major US airlines on smart luggage with non-removable batteries. The company's intellectual property was sold to Travelpro and the company's products will no longer be supported.

== History ==
=== Crowdfunding campaign ===
In October 2014, the company launched its first product on Indiegogo, asking for support of their campaign – offering pre-orders of their product as rewards. The company met its goal in two hours and broke records in the Hardware category by pre-selling 10,000 units to 114 countries and collecting more than $2.2 million in contributions. In November 2014, while their extended Indiegogo campaign was still ongoing, the company was selected by Silicon Valley–based startup accelerator Y Combinator to be part of its program for the Winter 2015 batch.

=== Production of the first smart carry-on ===
After Bluesmart Inc.'s manufacturing prototype passed its first reliability tests in June 2015, they set up a Mass Production division and local team in China which quickly grew to 15 employees. Bluesmart Inc. began shipping what would be known as the Bluesmart One in August 2015.

== Products ==
In late 2015, the brand released Bluesmart One.

In 2016, the brand released the premium Bluesmart Black Edition carry-on, which was more durable, and had an upgraded exterior anti-theft system.

In June 2017, Bluesmart Inc. introduced its Series 2 products including the Bluesmart Cabin, Check, Laptop Bag and Passport Pouch.

Bluesmart Inc. was awarded the Red Dot Best of the Best Design Award category.

== See also ==
- Airbus Bag2Go, a similar concept announced in 2013
- Delsey, who have announced a similar product
