= Anita Willets Burnham Log House =

Historic house in Illinois, United States

- U.S. National Register of Historic Places
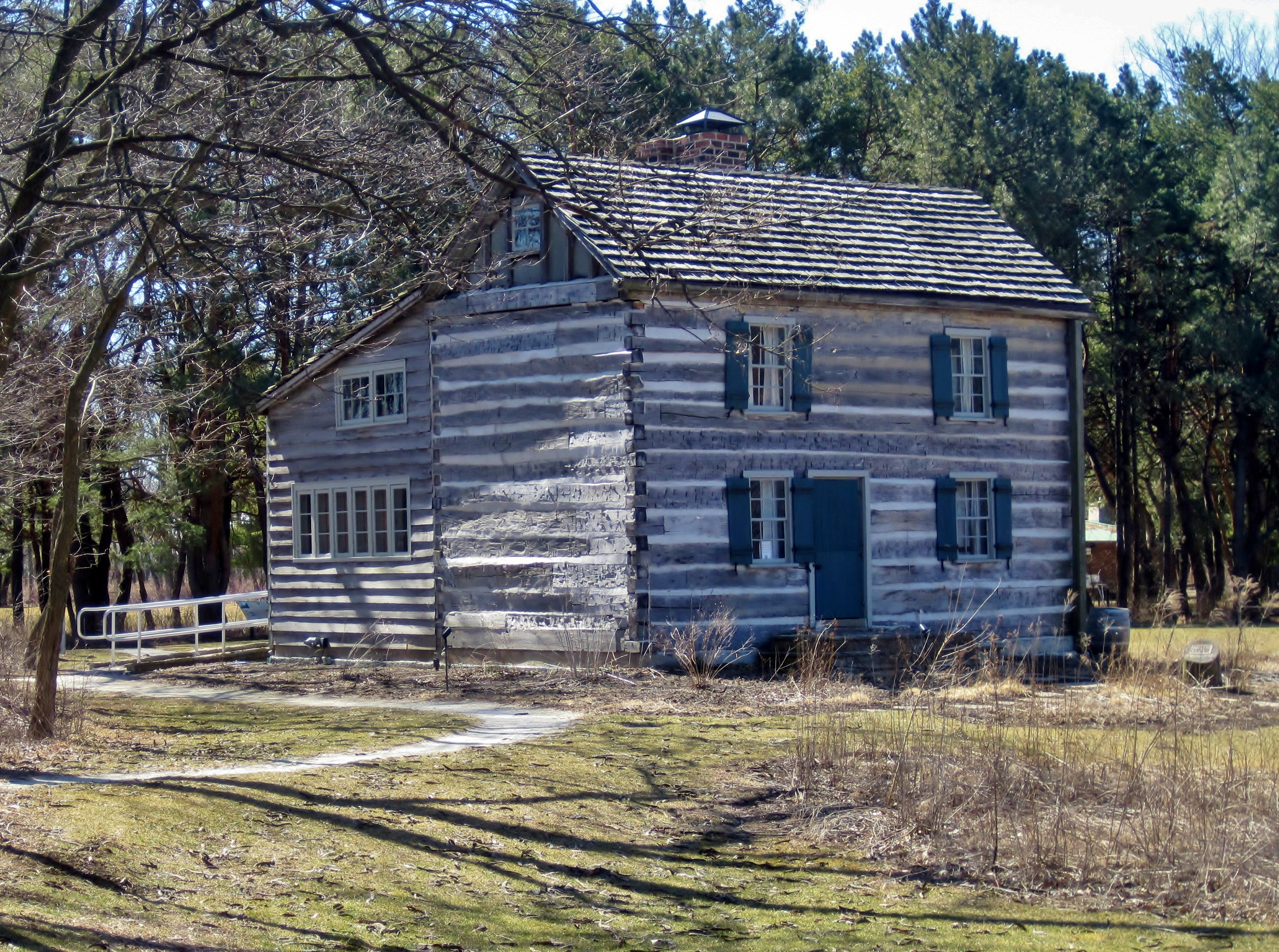

- Location within Illinois Location within the United States
- Location: 1140 Willow Rd., Winnetka, Illinois
- Coordinates: 42°6′1.75″N 87°44′50.52″W
- Area: less than one acre
- Built: c. 1836
- Architectural style: Log House
- NRHP reference No.: 04001297
- Added to NRHP: June 2, 2005

The Anita Willets Burnham Log House, also commonly known as the Schmidt-Burnham Log House, located at 1140 Willow Rd. in the Crow Island Woods of Winnetka, Illinois, United States, was the home and studio of artist and author Anita Willets-Burnham. The log house, which is 2 1/2 stories tall and made of hand-hewn, squared oak logs, was built approximately 1836 on a farmstead in south central Winnetka. In 1917, Willets-Burnham purchased the house from Indian Hill Club on the condition it be moved from their golf course, on the 9th green hole. It was therefore moved to 1401 Tower Road in northwest Winnetka; she placed an addition on the home in the same year. Willets-Burnham was a prominent painter whose work was based on Impressionism and realism, and she often painted outdoors; in fact, she discovered the log house while on a painting expedition. She continued her artistic career until the 1930s, when she became a writer and authored Round the World on a Penny, an account of her travels in the 1920s. Willets-Burham lived in the cabin until her death in 1956.

Willets-Burnham placed a great importance on preserving the house due to its age and place in early Winnetka settlement, and she furnished the house with period 1800s furniture rather than contemporary items. Her preservation efforts predate any other attempts to save North Shore log cabins by over fifty years, and the cabin is now the largest and likely the oldest surviving log cabin in the area. After her death, her two daughters lived in the home until their deaths in 1978 and 2000. The Winnetka Historical Society then inherited the home and relocated it to Crow Island Woods to save it from demolition. It was added to the National Register of Historic Places on June 2, 2005.
