= Jesse Shwayder =

American businessman, founder of Samsonite Corporation

- Born: March 26, 1882; Black Hawk, Colorado, U.S.
- Died: July 25, 1970 (aged 88); Denver, Colorado, U.S.
- Occupation: Businessman

Jesse Shwayder (March 26, 1882 – July 25, 1970) was an American businessman. He was the founder, president and chairman of the Samsonite Corporation, "the world's largest luggage manufacturer" by the time of his death.

== Early life ==
Shwayder was born on March 16, 1882, in Black Hawk, Colorado. He was of Polish-Jewish descent. His father, Isaac, owned a grocery store followed by a furniture store in Denver, where Shwayder worked as a teenager.

== Career ==
Shwayder began his career as a salesman for the Seward Trunk Co. in New York City.

Shwayer founded the Shwayder Trunk Manufacturing Company in Denver in 1910. He served as its president from 1910 to 1960, and later served as its chairman. The company introduced a new suitcase called Samsonite in 1939, and it changed its name to the Samsonite Corporation in 1965.

Shwayder was inducted into the Colorado Business Hall of Fame posthumously, in 1991.

== Personal life and death ==
Shwayder married Nellie Weitz. They had a son and four daughters.

Shwayder died on July 25, 1970, in Denver, at age 88. By the time of his death, Samsonite had become "the world's largest luggage manufacturer."
