= American Tourister =

American luggage brand

- Formerly: American Luggage Works
- Type: Brand
- Industry: Luggage
- Founded: 1933; 93 years ago
- Founders: Sol and Irving Koffler
- Headquarters: Providence, Rhode Island, United States
- Area served: Worldwide
- Products: Backpacks, suitcases, wallets, Duffel bags
- Parent: Samsonite
- Website: americantourister.com

American Tourister is a brand of luggage owned by Samsonite. Brothers Sol and Irving Koffler founded American Luggage Works in Providence, Rhode Island, United States in 1933. In 1993, American Tourister was acquired by Astrum International, which also owns Samsonite. Astrum was renamed as the Samsonite Corporation two years later. American Tourister's products include backpacks, duffel bags, suitcases and wallets. Today, American Tourister products are priced lower than Samsonite products.
