= Fernando Pierucci =

Argentine footballer

Personal information
- Full name: Fernando Javier Pierucci
- Date of birth: November 28, 1979 (age 46)
- Place of birth: Arteaga, Argentina
- Height: 1.80 m (5 ft 11 in)
- Position: Striker

Senior career*
Years	Team	Apps	(Gls)
1998–2002	Rosario Central	32	(5)
2003	Universidad de Chile		
2004	ESPOLI		
2004–2005	Almagro	1	(0)
2005	Ragusa		
2006	San Isidro		
2006–2007	Comarca de Níjar		
2007–2011	Cerro Reyes		
- * Club domestic league appearances and goals

Fernando Javier Pierucci (born November 28, 1979, in Arteaga) is an Argentine former professional footballer.

He played on the professional level in Primera División Argentina for Rosario Central and Club Almagro.
