= Tumi Inc. =

American suitcase and bag manufacturer

Tumi, Inc.
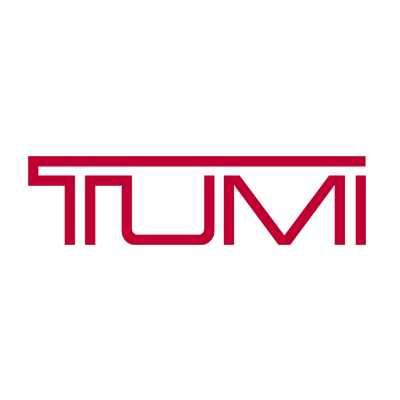
- Type: Subsidiary
- Founded: 1975; 51 years ago, in the United States
- Founder: Charlie Clifford
- Headquarters: Edison, New Jersey, U.S.
- Parent: Samsonite 2016; 10 years ago
- Website: www.tumi.com

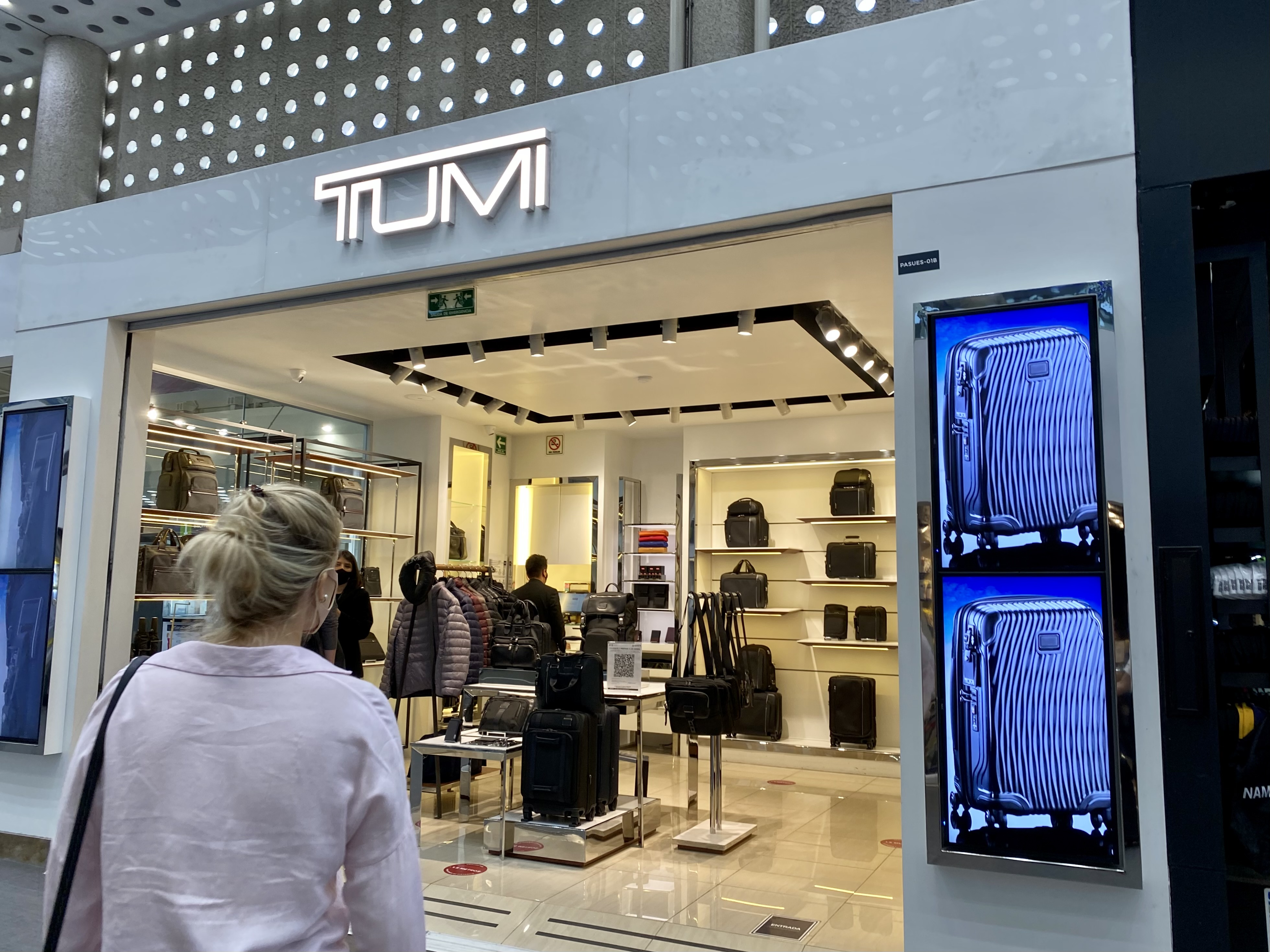
A Tumi store in Mexico City

Tumi Holdings, Inc., is a manufacturer of high-end suitcases and bags for travel based in Edison, New Jersey. It was a unit of Doughty Hanson & Co. from 2004 until after its 2012 initial public offering, which preceded its acquisition by Samsonite in 2016.

The brands has over 120 flaghsip stores and 200 shops around the world.

== History ==
Tumi was founded in 1975 by Charlie Clifford after a corporate job in marketing and a stint with the Peace Corps. He named it so after a Peruvian tumi ceremonial knife.

In 2016 Samsonite announced that they had finalized a deal to purchase Tumi for 1.8 billon dollars.

== Products ==
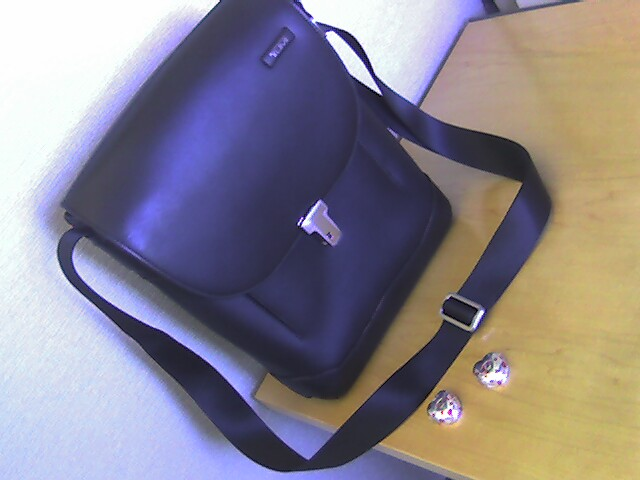
A Tumi men's bag

Tumi's products are known for their black-on-black ballistic nylon.

Tumi also supplies accessories such as belts, pens, and electronic equipment. The company teamed with designer Anish Kapoor in 2006 to produce the PowerPack Backpack that incorporated solar technology for charging phones and PDAs. The company also had a licensing agreement with the Italian motorcycle manufacturer Ducati to launch a collection of eight co-branded pieces in 2006, sold through both of the brands' retail outlets.

Tumi puts a metal plate with a unique 20-digit registration number in each of its bags. Customers can register for the Tumi Tracer program to have their contact information entered into a central database so they can be reunited with their bag if it is found.

Tumi offers a five-year conditional warranty across all its products. It had a conditional lifetime warranty policy.

Tumi's products are considered high-end and expensive.

== Operations ==
In 2004, London-based private equity firm Doughty Hanson & Co acquired Tumi for US$276 million. This was a secondary market purchase from Oaktree Capital, which had acquired a majority stake in 2002.

Jerome Griffith became the CEO of Tumi, Inc. in 2009.

On April 19, 2012, Tumi made an initial public offering of 18,779,865 shares, as Tumi Holdings, Inc. (NYSE: TUMI). In December 2013, Joseph R. Gromek was named Chairman of Board of Directors.

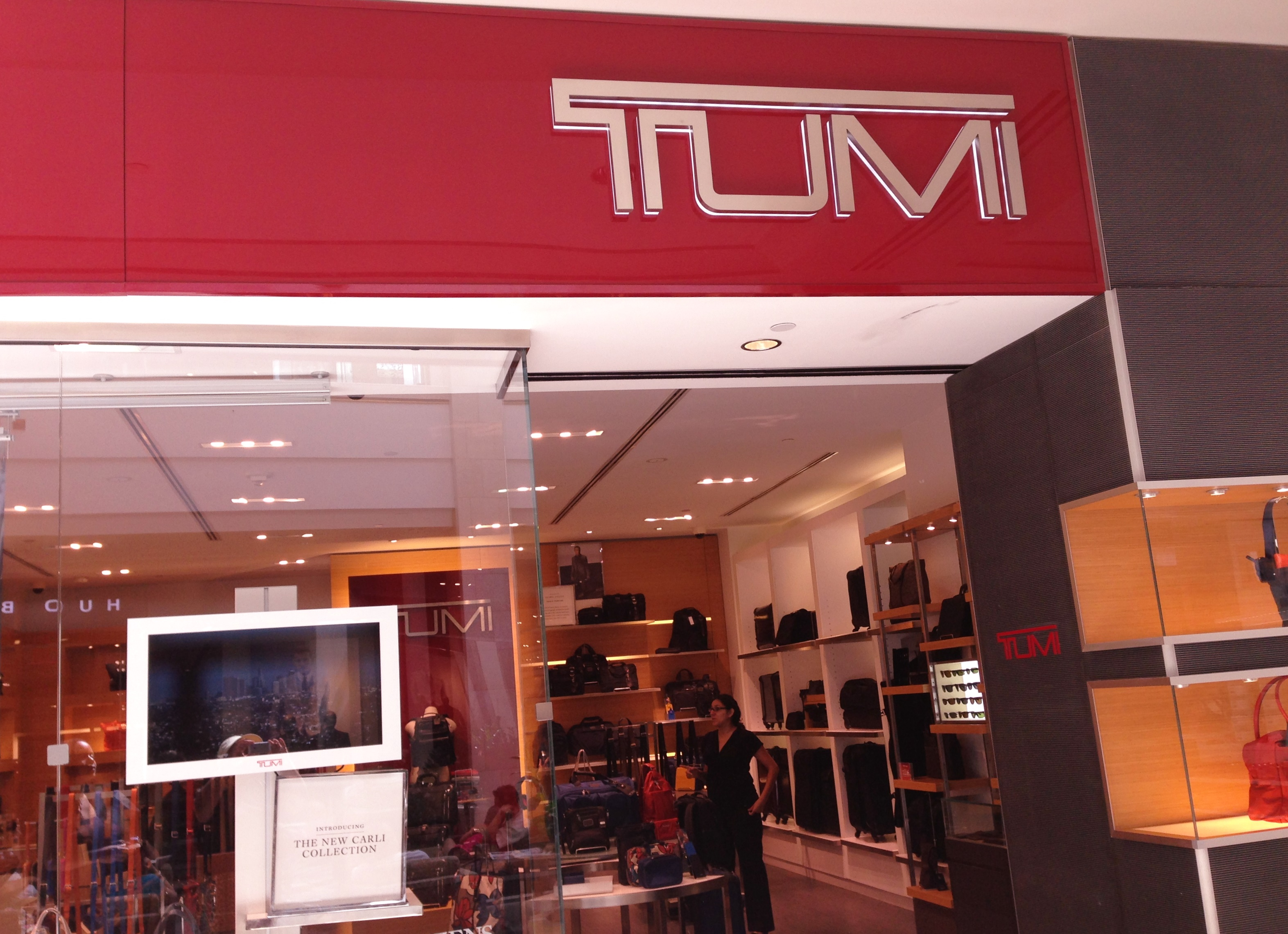
Tumi store in Westfield Topanga & The Village

On March 4, 2016, Samsonite announced it would acquire Tumi in an all-cash transaction worth $1.8 billion.

In July 2025, Tumi opened its first flagship store in China.

== In popular culture ==
Its 19 Degree Aluminum Briefcase was featured in the 2022 David Leitch film Bullet Train.

== Sponsorship ==
In November 2019, McLaren announced a partnership agreement with Tumi as the official luggage partner for McLaren Racing and McLaren Automotive. In September 2026, Tumi became a sponsor of LN4 Fusion, a junior-level racing team co-founded by McLaren driver and Formula One World Champion Lando Norris, who is a global brand ambassador for Tumi.
