= Suitcase =

Form of luggage

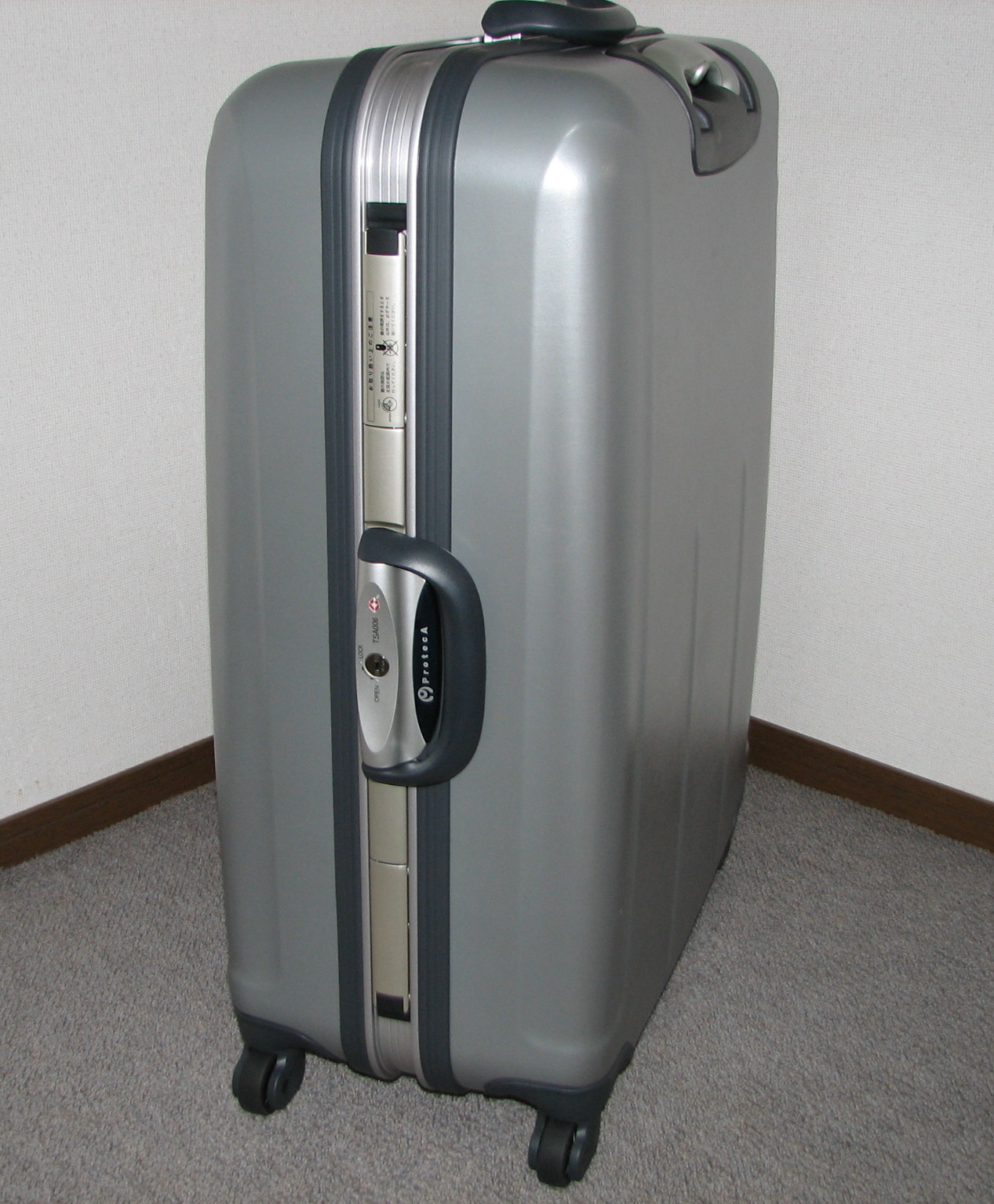
A perspective picture of a modern suitcase

A suitcase is a form of baggage. It is a rectangular container with a handle and is typically used to carry one's clothes and other belongings while traveling. The first suitcases appeared in the late 19th century due to the increased popularity of mass tourism at the time, and were meant to hold dress suits (hence their name). They were originally made using heavier materials such as leather or steel, but, beginning in the 1930s, were constructed with more lightweight materials like plastic and cardboard.

Before the 1970s, the idea of rolling luggage was shunned by the travel industry, who viewed it as much less masculine than traditional luggage. American entrepreneur Bernard Sadow pitched his version of the wheeled suitcase, for which he was granted a patent in 1972, to various department stores before it was picked up and sold at Macy's stores starting in 1970. It took several years to become the predominant form of suitcase, and Sadow's version was soon superseded by the Rollaboard, a type of wheeled suitcase that was upright rather than flat like Sadow's model and invented in 1987 by American pilot Robert Plath. The addition of wheels to the suitcase has since been called one of the most significant innovations in travel.

Smart suitcases with enhanced capabilities such as GPS tracking and device charging were popularized in the 2010s, though explosions of their lithium-ion batteries in cargo holds caused them to be banned from being checked by many major airlines in the late 2010s.

== History ==
=== 12th century to late 19th century: Luggage before the suitcase ===
During the Crusades, the first luggage—wheeled containers used to transport weaponry—was developed in 1153. The word "luggage", derived from the verb "lug", was added to the Oxford English Dictionary in 1596 to mean "denoting inconveniently heavy baggage". Luggage prior to the invention of the suitcase was mostly wood and leather trunks with an iron base, which were waterproofed using canvas or tree sap. Servants were often made to carry these trunks for their owners, such as for European elites during the Grand Tour in the 18th century, since travel was mostly exclusive to the wealthy.

=== Late 19th century to mid-20th century: Beginnings ===
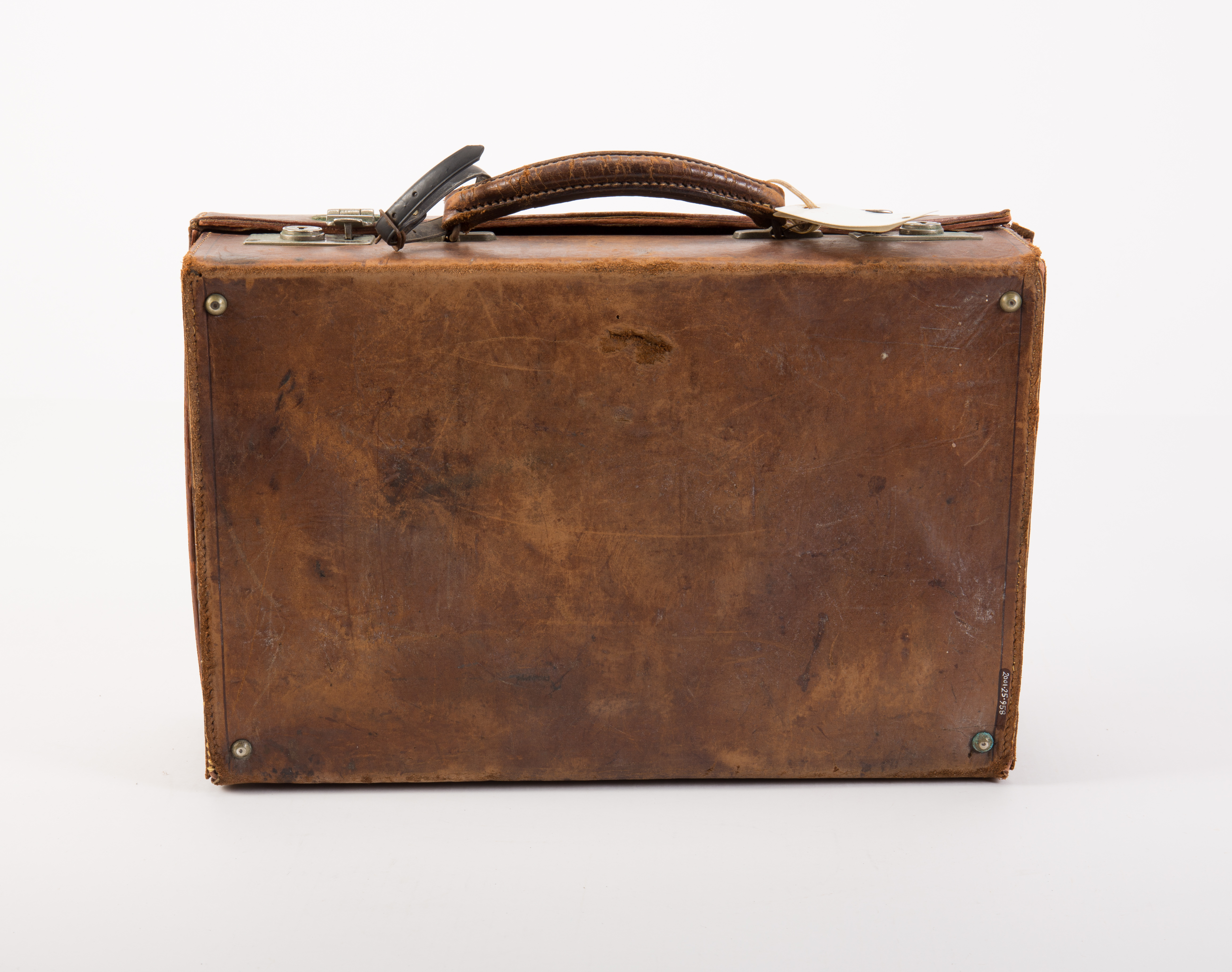
A brown leather suitcase from the Auckland War Memorial Museum that belonged to a QAIMNS staff nurse during World War I

As mass tourism increased in popularity and travel became accessible to non-elites due to railways and cruise ships, the need for more practical luggage increased. In the late 19th century, the first luggage known as "suit cases" or "suit-cases", which were meant to carry dress suits without wrinkling them, came about. Other terms used include "grip" or "gripsack", especially for small luggage. The earliest models of suitcases were invented by British businessmen, who used them to carry goods and clothing. They were modeled after trunks and made by stretching leather, rubbery cloth, or wicker over a flat, rigid frame made of wood or steel with leather or brass caps on the corners and a handle on their long side, contrasting them with trunks, which had handles on their two shorter sides. They typically had a compartment for shirts and a hat box on the inside. Suitcases first started being manufactured alongside trunks by luggage companies such as the Shwayder Trunk Manufacturing Company, which would later be renamed Samsonite. They were initially considered a lesser alternative to trunks, as evidenced by North American travel catalogs from the turn of the 20th century advertising trunks much more prominently than suitcases.

Lightweight suitcases were mostly marketed at first toward women. In 1938, a weight limit of 40 pounds for checked bags was established in the United States, which led to the heavier leather model of suitcase being supplanted by lighter plastic and cardboard suitcases throughout the 1930s and 1940s. German luggage company Rimowa built the first aluminum suitcase, which it started selling in 1950 with a grooved design inspired by the Junkers Ju 52 airplane. In Europe, porters were responsible for carrying train passengers' suitcases until around the middle of the 20th century, when they became less abundant.

=== 1970s to 2000s: Wheeled suitcases ===
Early patents for a wheeled trunk and a wheeled suitcase came in 1887 and 1945, respectively, and a design for a "portable porter", a wheeled device that could be attached to a suitcase, was advertised in British newspapers in the 1940s. However, none of these designs originally caught on. During her second world tour in 1928, American artist Anita Willets-Burnham made the first recorded wheeled suitcase, which had two baby carriage wheels attached to it and a telescoping wooden handle. Until the 1970s, wheeled luggage was seen by the travel industry as a niche invention solely for women.

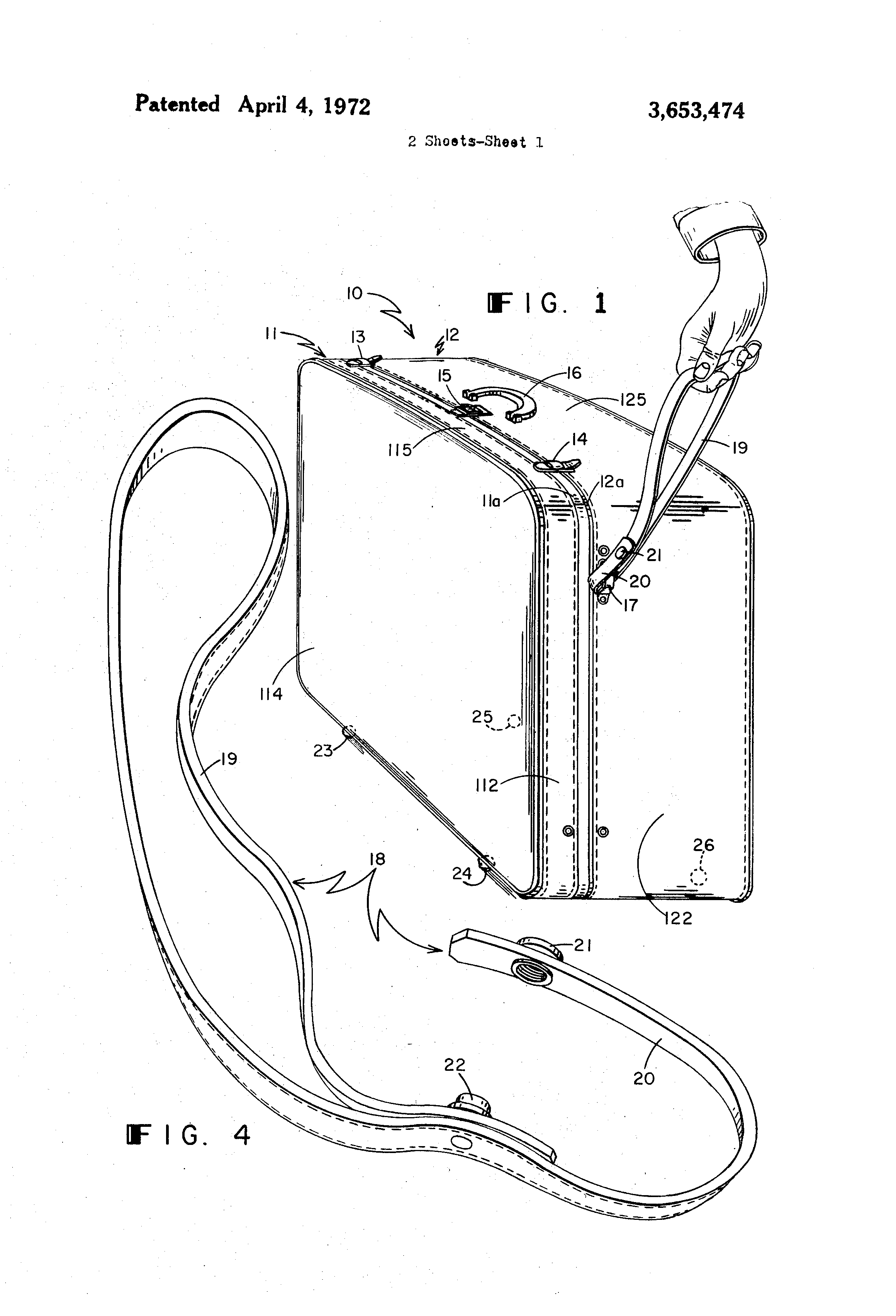
An illustration from Bernard D. Sadow's 1972 patent for rolling luggage

In 1970, Bernard D. Sadow, the then-vice president of Massachusetts luggage company U.S. Luggage, was carrying two heavy 27-inch suitcases at an airport in Puerto Rico on his way back from a family vacation in Aruba when he noticed a worker rolling a heavy machine on a wheeled platform. After remarking to his wife that people needed wheels for their luggage, Sadow returned to his factory in Fall River, Massachusetts and attached casters to a suitcase with a strap that allowed him to tow it behind him. Sadow spent months attempting to sell his wheeled suitcase to various New York City department stores, but was met with resistance. Most department stores, according to him, refused to sell his invention due to a "macho feeling" that men would consider rolling their luggage "wimpy" and that women who travelled would have their husbands around to carry their suitcases for them.

After being turned away by Jack Schwartz, a Macy's buyer, a vice president from the company, Jerry Levy, called Sadow back in for a meeting. He instructed Schwartz to buy Sadow's suitcases, and Macy's began selling them in stores in October 1970, advertising them as "The Luggage That Glides" and showcasing them with mannequins; they rose in popularity soon thereafter. That same year, Sadow applied for a patent for "rolling luggage", which had rollers on its bottom wall and a flexible transport strap attached near the top, and was granted it as patent number 3,653,474 in 1972. It stated that, due to airplanes replacing trains as the primary mode of long-distance travel, "Baggage-handling has become perhaps the biggest single difficulty encountered by an air passenger." Macy's competitors came together to break the patent about two years after it was granted to Sadow, allowing them to sell their own wheeled luggage, although Sadow's model was often wobbly and difficult to maneuver. Sadow later died in 2011.

==== 1980s to 2000s: Rollaboards and other innovations ====
The Rollaboard or roll-aboard (also referred to as a rollerboard, an eggcorn of the term) is an upright wheeled suitcase with two wheels on the bottom and a telescoping handle invented by Robert Plath, a Northwest Airlines 747 pilot, in 1987. He had the idea while at a hotel during a layover in Scandinavia as he watched passengers struggle to get their bags, which were attached by bungee cords, out of luggage trolleys. He designed the prototype for the Rollaboard in his garage, screwing a hard-shell bag to a luggage trolley, and started to get ideas from other crew members while carrying it around. It marked a shift from Sadow's model, which rolled flat on four wheels. At first, Plath only sold the Rollaboard to fellow pilots and flight attendants, manufacturing and selling 100 of the bags to various crew members in December 1989.

In 1991, Plath left Northwest Airlines to start the luggage company Travelpro in Deerfield Beach, Florida, which initially only sold the product to other flight crews. He hired a team of sales representatives in 1992, and in the mid-1990s, Travelpro started selling Rollaboards commercially in retail stores, making it a competitor of Samsonite, then the largest American luggage manufacturer. Plath sold Travelpro in 1999. The Rollaboard was widely imitated by other luggage companies starting around 1993, causing Sadow's design to quickly be almost entirely replaced. Designer Don Ku from Flushing, Queens, invented and patented a suitcase with an extendable handle in 1993. In 2004, Samsonite started selling the first "spinner-style" suitcase, which had four wheels and could be moved and spun in any direction. Durability testing for suitcases also became more rigorous around this time as they became lighter.

=== Since 2010s: Smart suitcases ===
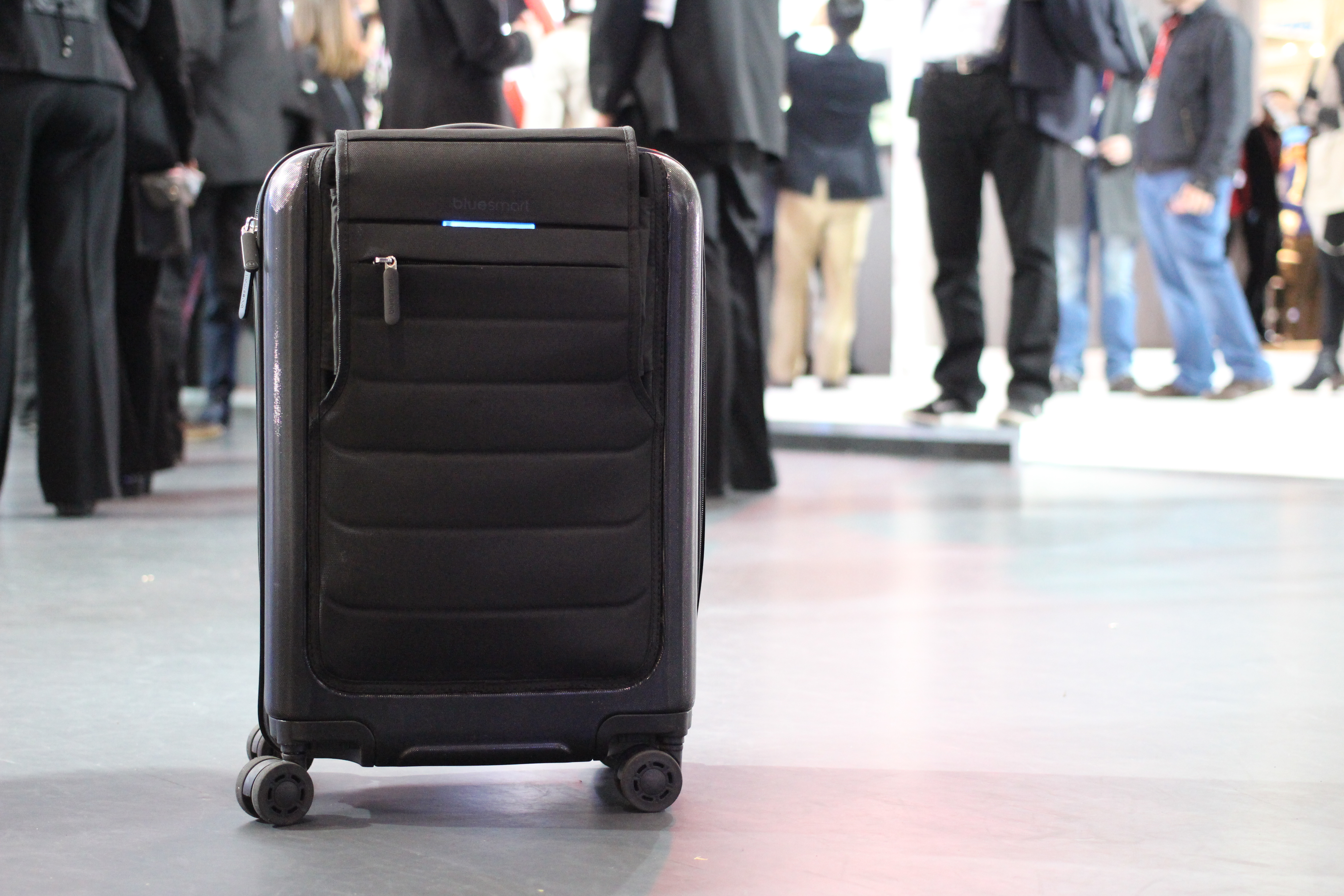
A smart suitcase created by Bluesmart, whose suitcases came with GPS tracking, an internal scale, and other features. The company shut down in 2018, which it blamed on a ban by many major airlines on smart suitcases with nonremovable lithium-ion batteries.

Smart suitcases—suitcases with built-in technological features—became popular in the 2010s. These features include internal tracking, geolocation, fingerprint scanners, device charging, scales, GPS capabilities, touch switches, remote locking, and computer vision, among others. Companies such as Away, Arlo Skye, and Ovis mostly sell smart luggage. Most smart suitcases are powered by a lithium-ion battery.

After a number of Li-ion batteries in smart suitcases exploded and caught fire in the cargo holds of planes, the International Air Transport Association classified the batteries as "dangerous goods". It published recommendations to its approximately 275 members, including United, JetBlue, and Virgin Atlantic, to put restrictions on smart suitcases with nonremovable batteries in May 2017. United States–based airlines including American, Alaska, Delta, and others banned smart luggage with nonremovable batteries from being checked in late 2017 and early 2018, while the United Kingdom's Civil Aviation Authority recommended a similar ban in 2018. Smart suitcase companies such as Bluesmart shut down as a result of these bans.

=== Other materials ===
The first suitcases made of polycarbonate were made in 2000 by the German luggage maker Rimowa. Samsonite made a push toward using materials such as vulcanized fibre and polypropylene in suitcases.

== As a symbol and in popular culture ==
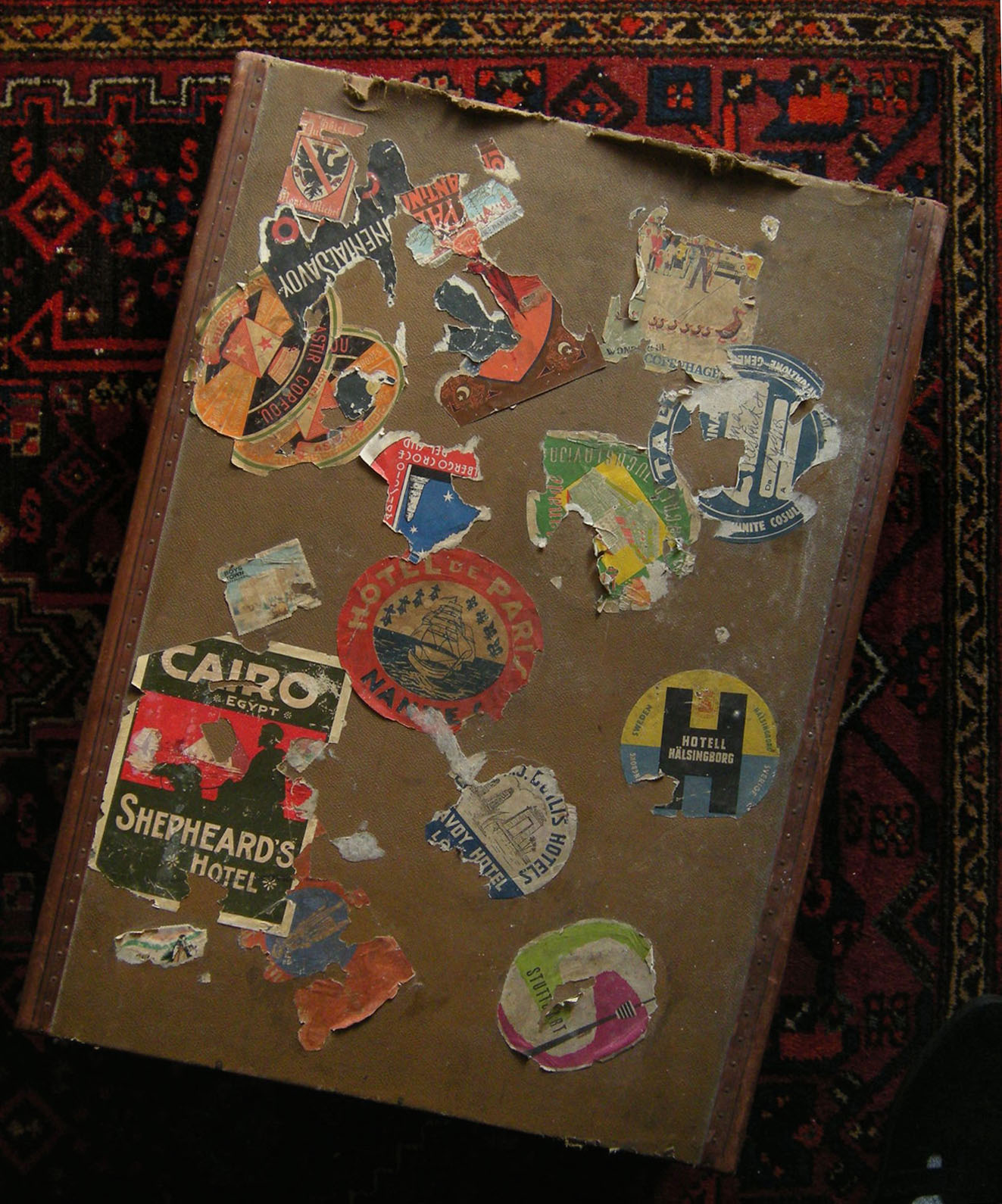
A suitcase covered in luggage tags, which were placed on customers' suitcases by hotels from the 1900s to the 1960s as a promotional tactic

Suitcases became culturally significant around the 1920s, when they made appearances in books like the Hardy Boys series and in films like the silent film The Woman in the Suitcase. Daniel A. Gross of Smithsonian described suitcases at the time as "a literary symbol for both mobility and mystery—perhaps filled with gold, photographs, or simply a stranger's possessions". In the mid-20th century, Mexican laborers who worked in the United States would often return home with suitcases as a status symbol to prove that they had become "cosmopolitan men". From the 1900s to the 1960s, hotels placed luggage labels on customers' suitcases to advertise themselves, with illustrations inspired by travel posters of the time.

The supposedly feminine nature of the wheeled suitcase was mocked in the 1984 film Romancing the Stone, where Kathleen Turner's character, Joan Wilder, brings her wheeled suitcase to the jungle, which bothers Michael Douglas's character, Jack T. Colton, who is attempting to fend off evil. Soo Youn of National Geographic included the suitcase, specifically the addition of wheels to it, on his list of inventions that changed travel forever, while SmarterTravel's Caroline Costello listed the wheeled suitcase as one of the best travel inventions of all time. Of the wheeled suitcase, Ian Jack wrote for The Guardian that "outside the cheap flight, no other modern development has made travel easier".

== See also ==
- Baggage
- Trunk
- Bag tag
