= Tomi Pierucci =

Argentine entrepreneur (born 1983)

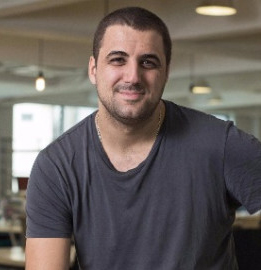
- Tomi Pierucci
- Born: Buenos Aires, Argentina

Tomi Pierucci (born September 6, 1983) is an Argentine entrepreneur. He is the founder of several successful businesses including Little Blue, Big Blue Ideas and Bluesmart.

== Personal life ==
Tomás Pierucci, better known as Tomi Pierucci, was born in Buenos Aires, Argentina to a family of entrepreneurs.

He studied Marketing at Universidad de Ciencias Empresariales y Sociales and continued his studies at IAE Business School and IESE Business School. He started his first company while still in high-school during the middle of Argentina's worst economic crisis.

== See also ==
- Bluesmart, Pierucci's latest company
