= Anita Willets-Burnham =

American painter

- Born: Anita Willets; August 22, 1880; Brooklyn, New York
- Died: July 7, 1958 (aged 77); Wilmette, Illinois
- Education: School of the Art Institute of Chicago, Pennsylvania Academy of the Fine Arts, Art Students League of New York, National Academy of Design

Anita Willets-Burnham was an American Impressionist artist, teacher at the School of the Art Institute of Chicago, author, and lecturer. She is best known for her 1933 book 'Round the World on a Penny about her international travels with her family. She was also apparently the inventor of the rolling suitcase.

== Biography ==
Anita Willets was born the sixth of eight children to Joseph Hewlett and Marie Louie Willets on August 22, 1880. Born in Brooklyn, New York, both sides of her family were descended from early colonial settlers to America. She moved with her family to Chicago, Illinois, in 1883 so that her father could pursue work at F. A. Fletcher & Co. As a child, Willets drew and wrote diaries. In 1899 Willets was accepted to the School of the Art Institute of Chicago, where she studied under John Vanderpoel. She later trained under Lawton S. Parker, Frederick Warren Freer, and John Christen Johansen in Chicago. In 1903, Willets was accepted to the Pennsylvania Academy of the Fine Arts in Philadelphia, where she studied under Impressionist painter William Merritt Chase. Willets also taught some courses at the school. The next year, she move to New York City to join the Art Students League of New York (ASL) and National Academy of Design. She returned to the Art Institute in 1905 for another two years of study. In 1906, she married Alfred Newton Burnham, the nephew of architect Daniel Burnham.

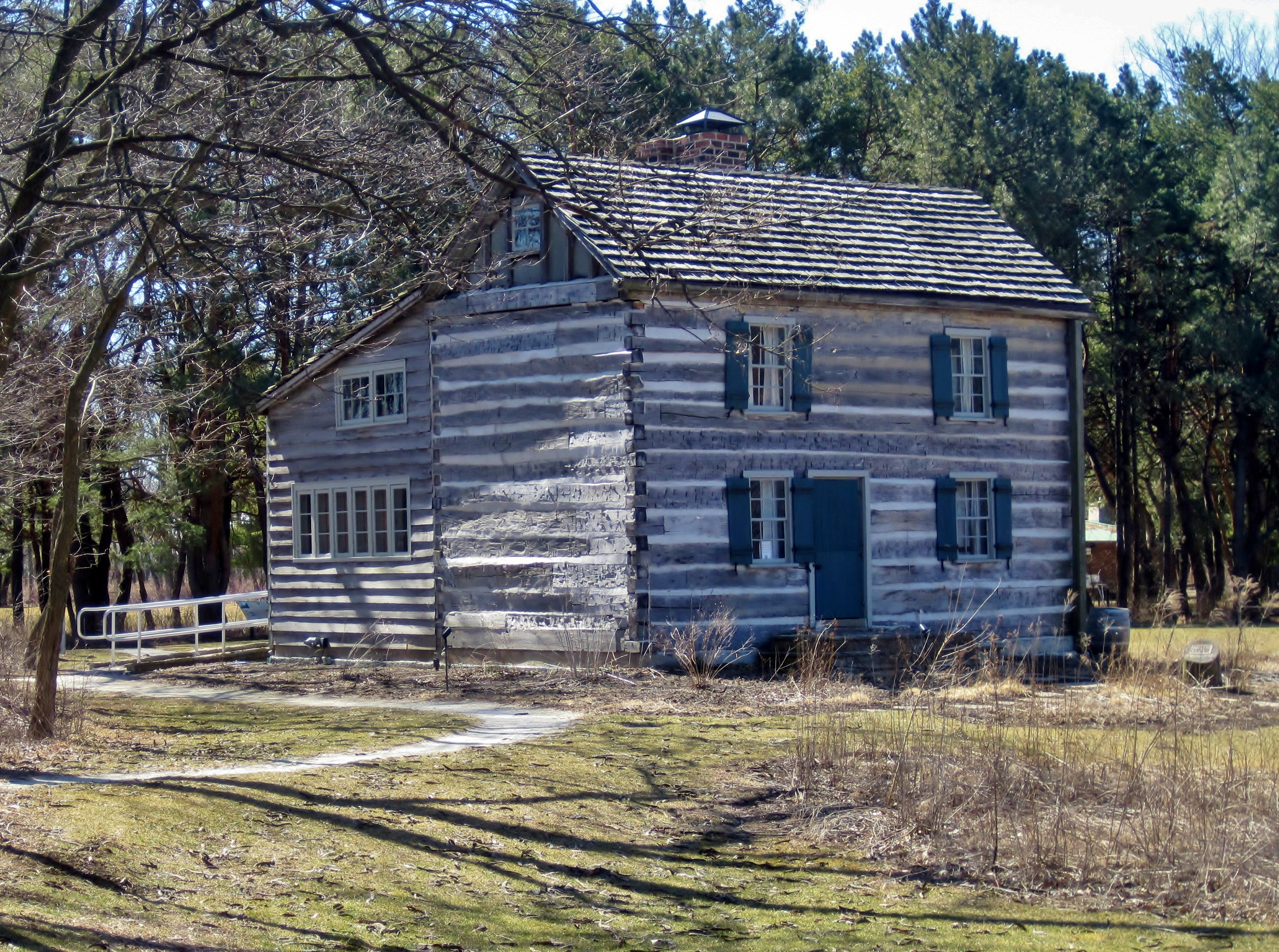
Willets-Burnham rehabilitated a c. 1837 log cabin for her home and studio

In the following decades, Willets-Burnham honed her craft. She was a member of many local arts organizations, including the Arts Club of Chicago. Her work was frequently exhibited at Art Institute shows, shown in 19 of the years between 1902 and 1927. In 1914, she discovered a c. 1820 log cabin in Winnetka, Illinois. She purchased it three years later and used it as her family's home and studio. In 1915, she exhibited her works at the Panama–Pacific International Exposition in San Francisco, where she was awarded three prizes for her water colors. In 1921, Willets-Burnham embarked on a "world tour", visiting France, Spain, Belgium, England, and North Africa. While in Paris, she studied with Cecilia Beaux. In 1928, she left for a second such tour, visiting Japan, Siam, Korea, China, India, Egypt, Palestine, Spain, England, Germany, Greece, Cyprus, Belgium, Morocco, Switzerland, and the East Indies. Upon her return, she taught at the Art Institute and continued to expand her professional affiliations.

She may have been the inventor of the first wheeled suitcase. “Why be a human truck horse?” Willets-Burnham asked before the Burnham’s 1928 trip, sparking her “grand idea.” “Wheels! Suitcase on Wheels!” she wrote in her book ‘Round the World on a Penny, her illustrated travelogue originally published in 1933. Her suitcase was fashioned by her son Bud with two wheels from an old baby carriage on one end and a telescoping wooden handle on the other.

In 1931, Willets-Burnham was presented in a one-man show at the Art Institute, though it included some works from her eldest daughter Carol-Lou. The show, "Water Colors by Anita willets-Bunham and Carol-Lou Burnham", ran from July 23 to October 11. In 1933, she was a staff member (and exhibitor) at the Century of Progress fair in Chicago. Willets-Burnham was also the benefactor of Works Progress Administration funds that were being distributed at the time for muralists, although only one work (for the George B. Armstrong School in Chicago) is ascertained. Willets-Burnham also had solo exhibitions at the Fine Arts Gallery of San Diego in California (1935) and the Vancouver Art Gallery (1940).

With the Great Depression greatly reducing the demand for painted art, Willets-Burnham turned to writing to supplement her income. In 1933, she published her first book via Covici-Friede, 'Round the World on a Penny, a memoir about her two world tours with her family. It was widely published and went through seven editions. Its popularity may have been spurred by its exhibition at the "Story Cove of the Enchanted Island" at the 1933 World's Fair. She joined the Illinois Woman's Press Association and, when founded in 1937, the National Federation of Press Women. Willets-Burnham promoted her book through a lecture tour. She became a popular speaker on international travel and art. A 1935 trip to Mexico with her daughter Ann resulted in her second book, Fourth of July in Old Mexico. In 1944, she helped raise $239,000 in war bonds from thirty-two Chicago area residents by pledging to paint their portraits. She remained active until suffering a stroke in 1956. She died on July 7, 1958, in a Wilmette convalescent home.

Anita Willets-Burnham's water color "Our White House, Washington, D.C." is part of the White House Pride of the American Nation, the White House collection of fine arts. Several of her works are found at the John H. Vanderpoel Art Museum in Chicago and the Winnetka Historical Society.
