= Michele Marani =

Sammarinese footballer

Personal information
- Date of birth: 16 November 1982 (age 43)
- Place of birth: San Marino
- Height: 1.66 m (5 ft 5 in)
- Position: Midfielder

Senior career*
Years	Team	Apps	(Gls)
2003–2004	AS Real Misano		
2004–2005	S.S. Pennarossa		
2005–2006	AS Real Misano		
2006	S.S. Pennarossa		
2007	Sporting Novafeltria		
2007–2009	S.S. Pennarossa		

International career^{‡}
2002–2009	San Marino	26	(1)
- * Club domestic league appearances and goals as of 18 July 2020 ‡ National team caps and goals as of 18 July 2020

Michele Marani (born 16 November 1982) is a retired football player from San Marino, who last played for S.S. Pennarossa.
