= Red Oxx Manufacturing =

Red Oxx Manufacturing, Inc. is an American manufacturing company which produces travel luggage. The company was founded in 1986 in Billings, Montana, by Jim Markel Sr., a retired Green Beret Captain, and originally produced fitness equipment. He was later joined by his son Jim Markel Jr. and Perry Jones, all of whom are retired military parachute riggers. In the U.S., the products have won a 'National Award for Luggage'. Also, the Red Oxx Safari Beano bag was Outside Magazine's 2004 Bag of the Year. As of 2017, Red Oxx sells about $2.5 million per year of their products.
