= Armored Trunk Manufacturing Company =

American company

The Armored Group, Inc.
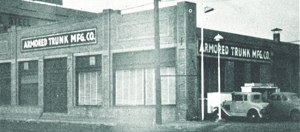
- Type: Private company
- Headquarters: North Hollywood, California, U.S.
- Key people: Louis Kaye, President
- Products: Road cases Pelican Cases; Storm Cases; Seahorse Cases
- Website: www.InnerspaceCases.com

Founded in 1907 by Louis Knell, in Youngstown, Ohio, Armored Trunk Manufacturing Company was one of America's largest manufacturers of steamers, trunks and luggage. During the Dust Bowl, Armored relocated west to Los Angeles, California where the company developed a reputation for building quality products to protect belongings while in transit.

During war times, Armored built footlockers for troops traveling overseas. With the introduction of commercial airline travel, Armored grew into one of the largest footlocker and luggage manufacturers in the country, utilizing its Los Angeles-based factory to produce goods, with New York City sales and distribution office serving some of the biggest national chains.

Through the 1980s, Armored introduced specialty luggage packages such as its proprietary brands Alfredo Fettuccini, Sports Network and Luggage Set in a Box and through the licensing of key brands such as Budweiser, Charles Schulz's Snoopy and Friends and the 1984 Olympic Team USA. Sales surged as Armored became the largest luggage and trunk manufacturer west of the Mississippi River.

In 1994, after much resistance to the changing marketplace for cheap imported goods, Armored Trunk Manufacturing Company sold its trunk manufacturing production line to Seward Trunk Company. Seward was subsequently purchased by Mercury Luggage Co. of Jacksonville, Florida forming the largest manufacturer of luggage and trunks in the United States.

After the divestiture of the trunk manufacturing production line, Armored focussed on its specialty line, Innerspace Cases, a manufacturer of ATA-style, custom protective road cases.
