= Armored group =

Armored group may refer to:

- Armored group (military unit), a unit type in the United States Army during World War II.
- Armored Group International, Inc., a security services company located in Los Angeles, California.
- The Armored Group LLC, a manufacturer of armored cash-in-transit vehicles located in Phoenix, Arizona.
- Armored Trunk Manufacturing Company, a manufacturer of steamer trunks and footlockers located in Los Angeles, California.
