= Footlocker =

Footlocker may refer to:

- Footlocker (luggage), a type of trunk or chest
- Foot Locker, an American sportswear and footwear retailer
