= H. J. Cave & Sons =

British leather accessories brand

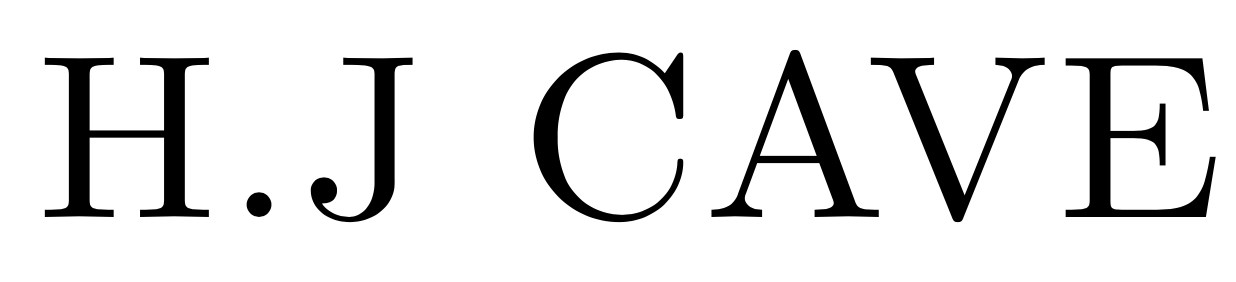
- Industry: Luxury Leather Accessories
- Founded: 1839
- Founder: Harriet Jane Cave
- Headquarters: London, United Kingdom
- Key people: Harriet Jane Cave Sarah Cave William Cave
- Products: Luxury goods
- Website: www.hjcave.com

H. J. Cave & Sons, variously styled as H.J. Cave with and without points, is a London-based fashion house specialising in luxury leather accessories. Founded in 1839 by Harriet Jane Cave. H. J. Cave is believed to be the first designer of the modern leather handbag.

The company was established in 1839 by sole-proprietor Harriet Jane Cave creating railway baskets and leather trunks. In 1856 Harriet began expanding the company to include a range of products including trunks, travel-bags, wickerworks, and portmanteaus. Queen Victoria sponsored participation at the World Fairs, and later H. J. Cave was awarded the English Royal Warrant of Appointment to the Queen, and later Princess Victoria. Following the death of Harriet, H. J. Cave was conferred to her son, William, and his wife Sarah, who would release the "Osilite" trunk as the demand for lightweight trunks increased following the adoption of automobile and flight travel. Following a decline in production after WWII, the company fell into a period of dormancy. Over the years, the company changed hands several times, and was formally reintroduced in the early 2000s and subsequently sold to foreign owners.

== History ==
The original company was established in 1839 by Harriet Jane Cave. In 1840, H.J. Cave opened their first workshop on 1 Edwards St, producing railway baskets, solid leather trunks and leather travel bags. H. J. Cave was well known for their railway baskets, as it provided a lighter alternative to the solid leather trunks. Railway baskets were lightweight waterproofed canvas or leather wicker trunks that swapped heavier wood for wicker baskets. The company produced several bespoke handbags in 1841, considered by some as the first modern leather handbags. The most notable of which was for Samuel Parkinson's wife, which currently resides in the Tassenmuseum. The company marketed several leather "hand bags" for women, predating the first use of the word "handbag" by around 30 years. These bags were advertised to women in magazines as early as 1868. H. J. Cave's handbags were sold alongside other accessories for men and women, which was uncommon at the time as companies typically focused on one gender.

Given H. J. Cave's success, and after the death of her husband Benjamin, Harriet moved premises to 74, 76, and 78 Wigmore street in 1856. At this location, H. J. Cave increased their product range to include more variations of their travel goods, including expanding trunks, travel bags and handbags. Shortly thereafter, Harriet moved premises to 40 Wigmore Street, which was designed by T.E. Collcutt, an English architect in the Victorian era who designed several important buildings in London. 40 Wigmore Street was the largest travel goods store in the world at the time.

At 40 Wigmore, H. J. Cave would begin to garner a reputation for high end leather work. This would lead to H. J. Cave's honorable mention at the World Exhibition in London 1862. This gained the attention of Queen Victoria who would sponsor the company to compete in the World Exhibition Paris in 1867, where they would win gold. Cave would win gold, silver and bronze once again in World Exhibition Paris 1878 for "articles de voyage," and an honorable mention in London 1874. Soon after, H. J. Cave was awarded the Royal Warrant of Appointment, and became the official supplier of luggages and railway baskets to Queen Alexandra and eventually Princess Victoria. Their tote bag was large enough to hold a baby, thus conferring one of theatre's all-time classic lines on Lady Bracknell in The Importance of Being Earnest.

They would continue to manufacture for the British Royal family and gained a number of famous customers including Ruth Vincent, Katherine Mansfield, T. E. Lawrence, William Gladstone, and Winston Churchill.

After the death of Harriet, the company was passed to heirs William and Sarah Cave. At the turn of the 20th century, the company would undergo structural changes including an increased focus on participation at World Fairs and new product developments. As travel shifted from railway to automobiles, William and Sarah would create the "Osilite" trunk. Keeping in line with the utility and luxury aspect of the brand, this trunk employed the use of pressurized wood to create lightweight trunks that could withstand the rougher conditions of the automobile and flight travel. These cases were widely used by wealthy immigrants to America and were a popular early flight case and was used on the 1933 Mt. Everest Expedition. After the death of William, Sarah would continue H. J. Cave and move the premises to 32 Wigmore Street. And extended workshops at 4 & 5 Blanford Mews, Baker street. This location marked the peak of H. J. Cave's business. Additionally, Cave began producing high end wicker furnishings and jewelry boxes.

Sarah would orchestrate the move to 12 Cavendish Street, and shortly thereafter her nephew Benjamin Cave would take over. Benjamin Cave would advertise heavily towards Americans in London and began reintroducing the Osilite trunk as a core product offering. In 1944, coinciding with WW2, H. J. Cave would see structural changes resulting in H. J. Cave being converted to a smaller scale workshop before ultimately ceasing.

The company has since changed hands several times and in the early 2000s, H. J. Cave was resurrected by Bluff Family Holding Group, the former owners of Parkinson's Butterscotch and Spanish firm Eurona as H. J. Cave & Sons Ltd, and was focused on maintaining their vintage collections, archival studies, and bespoke items. In 2021, H. J. Cave was sold to foreign owners and continues to sell products on a bespoke basis.
