= Martin Maier =

Union Army soldier

- Born: January 20, 1840; Langensteinbach, Baden, Germany
- Died: November 9, 1893 (aged 53); Detroit, Michigan, United States
- Occupation(s): Trunk and luggage manufacturer

Martin Maier (January 20, 1840 – November 9, 1893) was the founder and proprietor of Martin Maier Trunk and Bag Company (est. 1865), which specialized in making specialty and sample trunks. His company, based in Detroit, Michigan, was one of the largest luggage and leather goods distributors in the Midwestern United States.

== Early life ==
Martin Maier was born January 20, 1840, in Langensteinbach, Grand Duchy of Baden. He learned the saddler's trade, eventually becoming a master saddle maker. At age twenty-one, he migrated to the United States, living with his sister in Monroe, Michigan. Later, he moved to Detroit where he joined the Wolfe Brothers in the trunk and saddlery business.

Maier moved to St. Louis in 1863 and, when the Civil War broke out, joined the Union Army. He participated in the March to the Sea Campaign from Atlanta and mustered out in 1865. During the war, he fashioned a saddle for General Tecumseh Sherman.

After the war, Maier moved back to Detroit, where he married Elizabeth Dorman on May 3, 1866. They had six children.

== Trunk and Bag Company ==
In 1865, Maier established his company at 55 Monroe Avenue in Detroit. He helped coordinate the construction of a business block with two friends, each occupying one-third of the block. The building contained a shoe store, a mortuary, and Maier's trunk and harness shop.

After a fire, Maier moved his store to 102 Woodward Avenue and expanded the business to a four-story block on Twelfth Street, where the trunks were constructed. Maier was prolific in producing patented designs that made his trunks unique. A distinguishing high-quality feature was the issuing of uniquely built oak slat trunks. On many of his trunks, two Ms would be stamped in pieces of the metal hardware, particularly his dome-tops.

== Death and legacy ==
Maier died on November 9, 1893, and was buried in Woodmere cemetery. After his death, his wife took over the presidency of the trunk company but rented it to the Scotten Tobacco Company. Later, she would give proprietorship to Frederick Paquette, who had joined the MM Company at the age of sixteen.

== Gallery ==
Examples of Martin Maier's Trunks
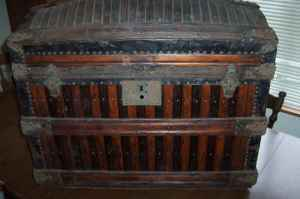
Very rare oak slat trunk with alternating slat colors

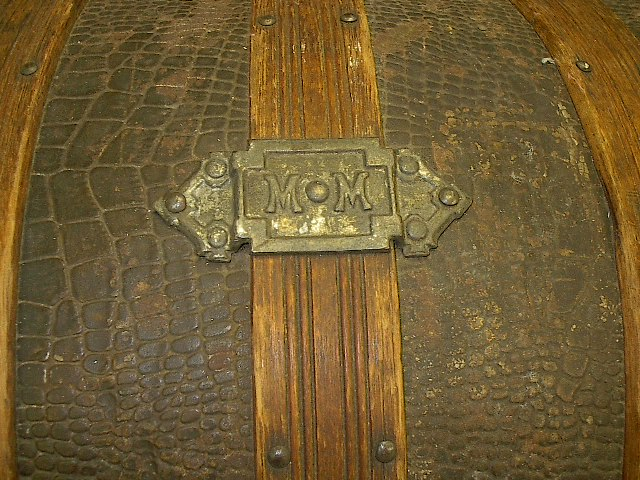
The two "M"s stamped in metal signify the maker of the trunk.

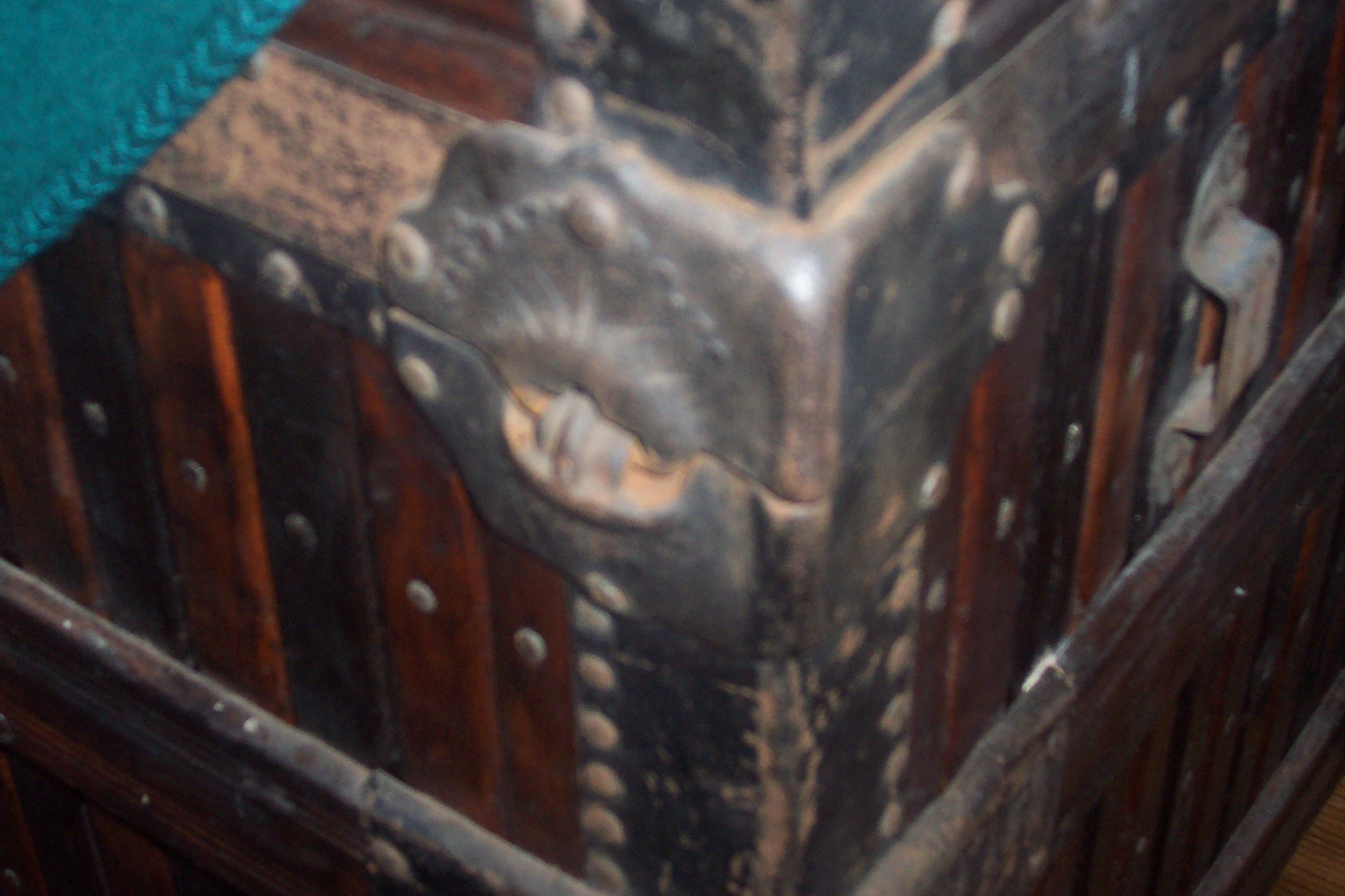
Martin Maier's unique patented hinge

== See also ==
- Trunk (luggage)
- M. M. Secor, a trunk maker in Racine, Wisconsin
