= Martin Mathias Secor =

American businessman and politician (1841–1911)

Martin M. Secor
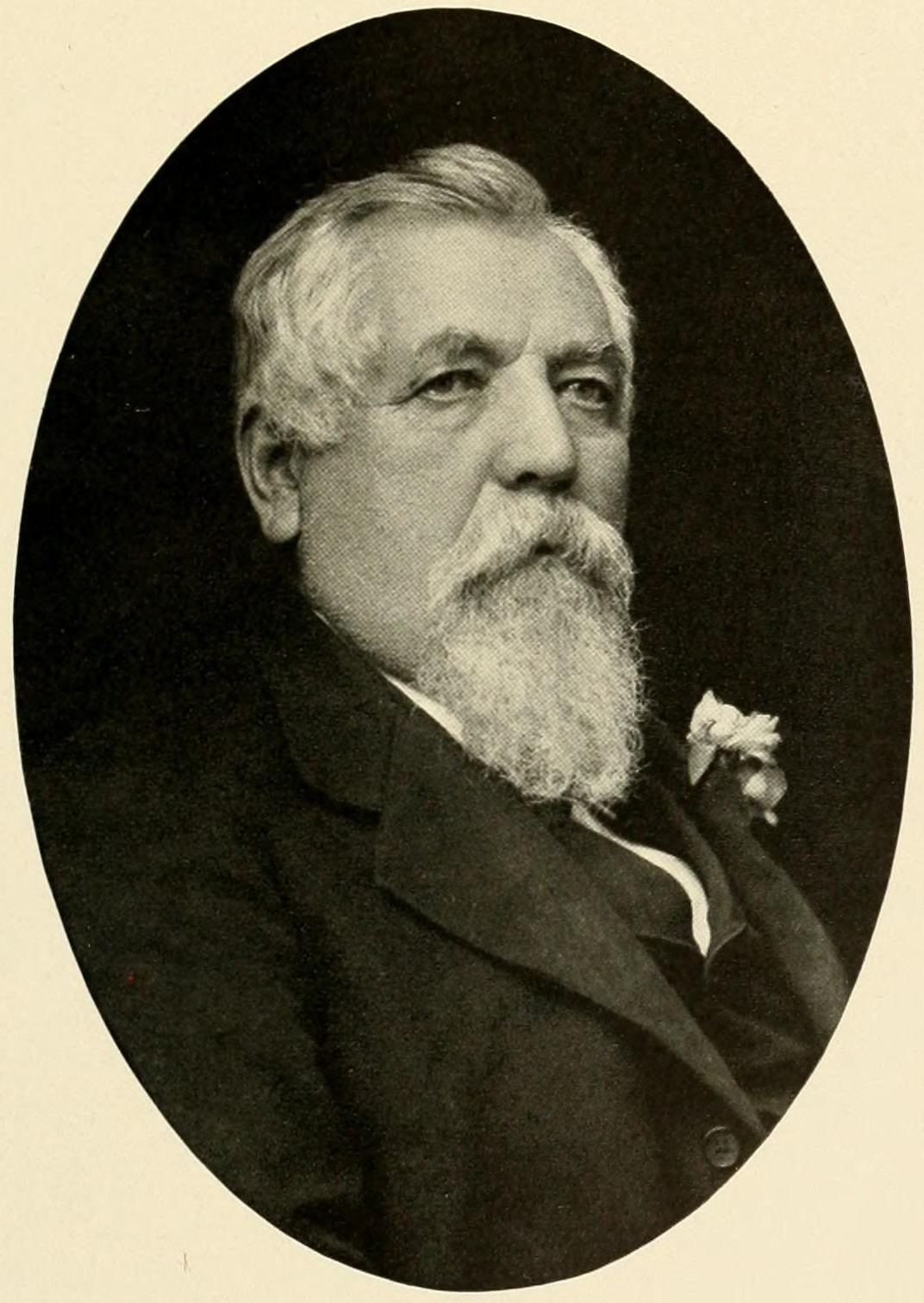

28th and 31st Mayor of Racine, Wisconsin
- In office April 1888 – April 1889
- Preceded by: Daniel A. Olin
- Succeeded by: Frank L. Mitchell
- In office April 1884 – April 1885
- Preceded by: Titus G. Fish
- Succeeded by: Joseph Miller

Personal details
- Born: February 4, 1841 Strakonitz, Austria
- Died: January 5, 1911 (aged 69) Racine, Wisconsin, US
- Resting place: Mound Cemetery, Racine
- Spouse: Frances H. "Fannie" Hayek (m. 1862; died 1937)
- Children: 9
- Parents: Mathias Secor (father); Josephine (Beider) Secor (mother)
- Occupation: trunk maker, politician

Martin Mathias Secor (February 4, 1841 – January 5, 1911) was a Bohemian American immigrant and businessman. He was the founder and proprietor of the Northwestern Trunk and Traveling Bag Manufactory and the M. M. Secor Trunk Company, and was the 28th and 31st mayor of Racine, Wisconsin.

== Early years ==
Secor was born in Strakonitz, Bohemia, then part of the Austrian Empire (now Strakonice, Czech Republic). He was the eldest of six children of Mathias (1807–1887) and Josephine (Beider) (1813–1889) Secor. At age 10, he immigrated with his family to Racine, Wisconsin. The trans-Atlantic journey took almost seven weeks in a sailing vessel. After they reached New York Harbor, they took a train to Buffalo. From there, they traveled by boat to Detroit, then by rail to Chicago, and then boarded a side-wheel steamer which took them to Racine.

Secor's father purchased a 15-acre farm near Racine, which he cleared and cultivated. Later he bought an additional 20 acres in the town of Caledonia. At age 14, after working four years on his father's farm, Secor left home to work for himself. He worked on a farm for a German family, and was given a wagon and a steer, which he lent to his father, and also earned enough money to buy his father an additional ox. After a two-year stint on the farm, Secor found work at a grocery store, earning eight dollars per month, which funded his board and washing. In 1857 he went to Darien, Wisconsin, where he learned the harnessmaker's trade. This inspired him to start a company dealing with harnesses and other commodities, such as the production of trunks.

After two years in Darien, he returned to Racine and worked as a journeyman. In late 1861, he opened a shop of his own, where he focused on making harnesses. In early 1862, he married Fannie Hayek, and they moved into a home at 89 Main Street. Their union would produce nine children. One of their daughters married F. W. Gromm, a trunk maker. Secor had success with his trunks; but since they were being made in his wife's small kitchen, dwindling space prompted him to rent out Weed's Hall, which later became City Hall. It is about this time that he dubbed the establishment: "The Northwestern Trunk and Traveling Bag Manufactory".

== M. M. Secor's Trunk Company's beginning ==
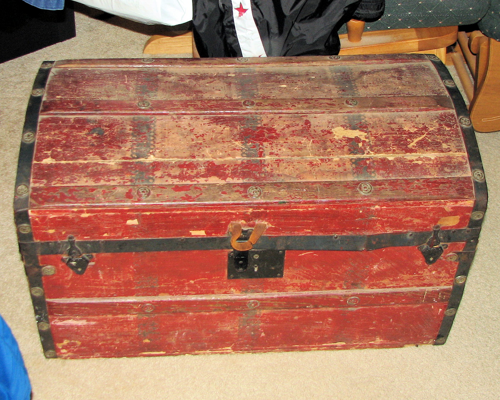
An M. M. Secor trunk

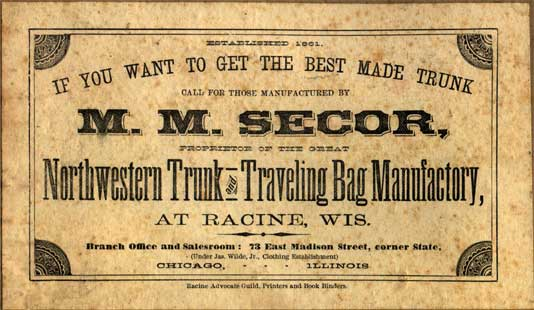
An M. M. Secor Company label

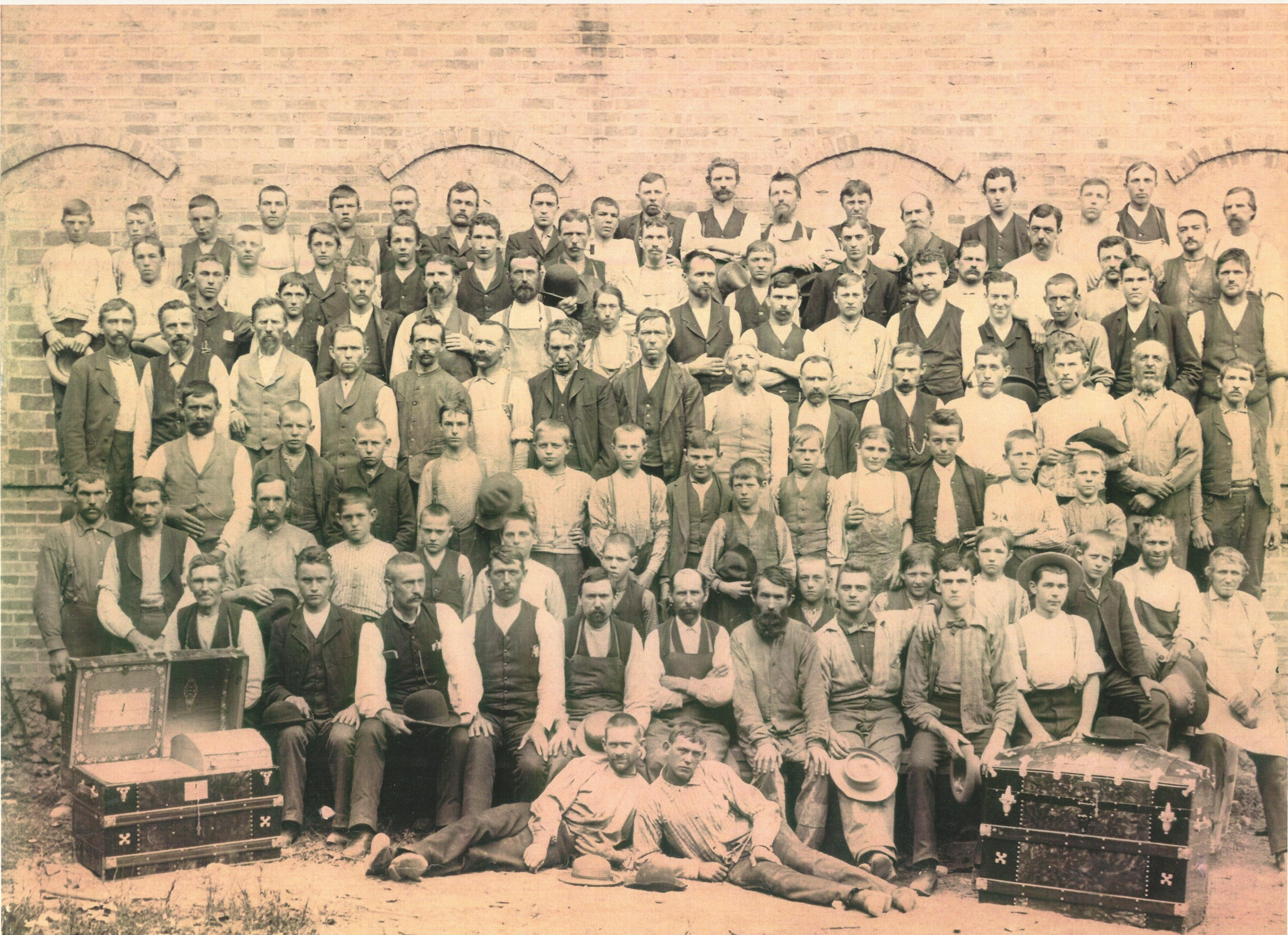
Employees of the M. M. Secor Trunk Company, ca. 1885-1890

In 1877, after purchasing the three Durand buildings and several lots on Chatham Street, Secor associated with two brothers, Joseph and Anthony Hayek. The trio styled the firm as "Northwestern Trunk and Traveling Bag Manufactory" as before, but with clearer emphasis on M. M. Secor's role. In 1878, Secor became sole proprietor. The M. M. Secor Company produced thousands of trunks, creating distinctive trunk styles, such as the Champion Wall Trunk. Secor built a five-story brick building on Chatham street, where he manufactured approximately 100 trunks a day, and grossed $100,000 a year.

This wealth permitted Secor to build a beautiful home on an entire block of Milwaukee Avenue (now Martin Luther King Jr. Drive). Secor referred to his estate as the "Park of China Asters" and it included a large flower conservatory and hothouse. It was noted for its gardens, fruit tree plots, and a water fountain that adorned the entrance. Secor had a strong affinity for nature and was a great lover of animals. His estate contained a small, personal zoo that housed a half-dozen deer, two bears, several parrots, and other birds. His factory employed 70 to 80 people in the early 1880s, and several hundred more in its heyday, and manufactured trunks and valises, which were sold in all sections of the country except the East Coast. Secor owned the block named after him, where the only fire-proof building in Racine was built. Other industries on the M. M. Secor block included the New Office building, the Belle City Furniture Company building, and bathrooms for furnishing Turkish, Russian, and Karlsbad commodities.

== Political involvement ==
Secor's reputation extended to the political arena. In 1884 and 1888, he was elected mayor of Racine. He was an Independent, voting for the man rather than for the party, which made him well-liked among the populace. When he ran for mayor for the first time in 1883, he ran as a Democrat, losing by 250 votes to Republican Titus Fish. The following year he was successful.

His first term saw the paving of streets in the city, including the streets in front of his factory and estate. Portions of Main and 6th Street were paved with limestone blocks. He removed wild dogs from the fifth ward near his house, which had reportedly killed some peacocks and several exotic pets that belonged to him.

In 1885, running a third time, he lost to Republican David Janes. Not until 1888 did he win another mayoral election, this time against challenger J. G. Meachem Jr. and Prohibition candidate J. P. Corse. Secor's strong opposition to the prohibition of alcohol caused the mayor of Chicago to dub him a drunkard, which prompted him to sue the mayor for libel. After his second term as mayor, Secor continued to administer the business of his factory, while being active in politics and propagating his beliefs on religion through the publishing of pamphlets.

Secor also has the distinction of being the only Racine Mayor to have survived an assassination attempt. In 1884, a rival trunk manufacturer planted a bomb in his driveway. The bomb's tripwire did not trigger the bomb as Secor passed, but the bomb did detonate a few minutes later, wounding the would-be assassin, John Jambor of Milwaukee. Jambor was arrested and sentenced to ten years in state prison for attempted murder.

Secor was a staunch Freethinker, opposing organized religion. His parents were once Roman Catholic, but lost faith in the Church and became Freethinkers as well, which supposedly influenced Secor's spiritual skepticism.

In 1907, Secor ran for another mayoral term, but lost to Alex Horlick, a Republican. The defeat resulted in his retirement from politics, but he remained active in producing new patents and designs for his trunks until his death.

== Death ==
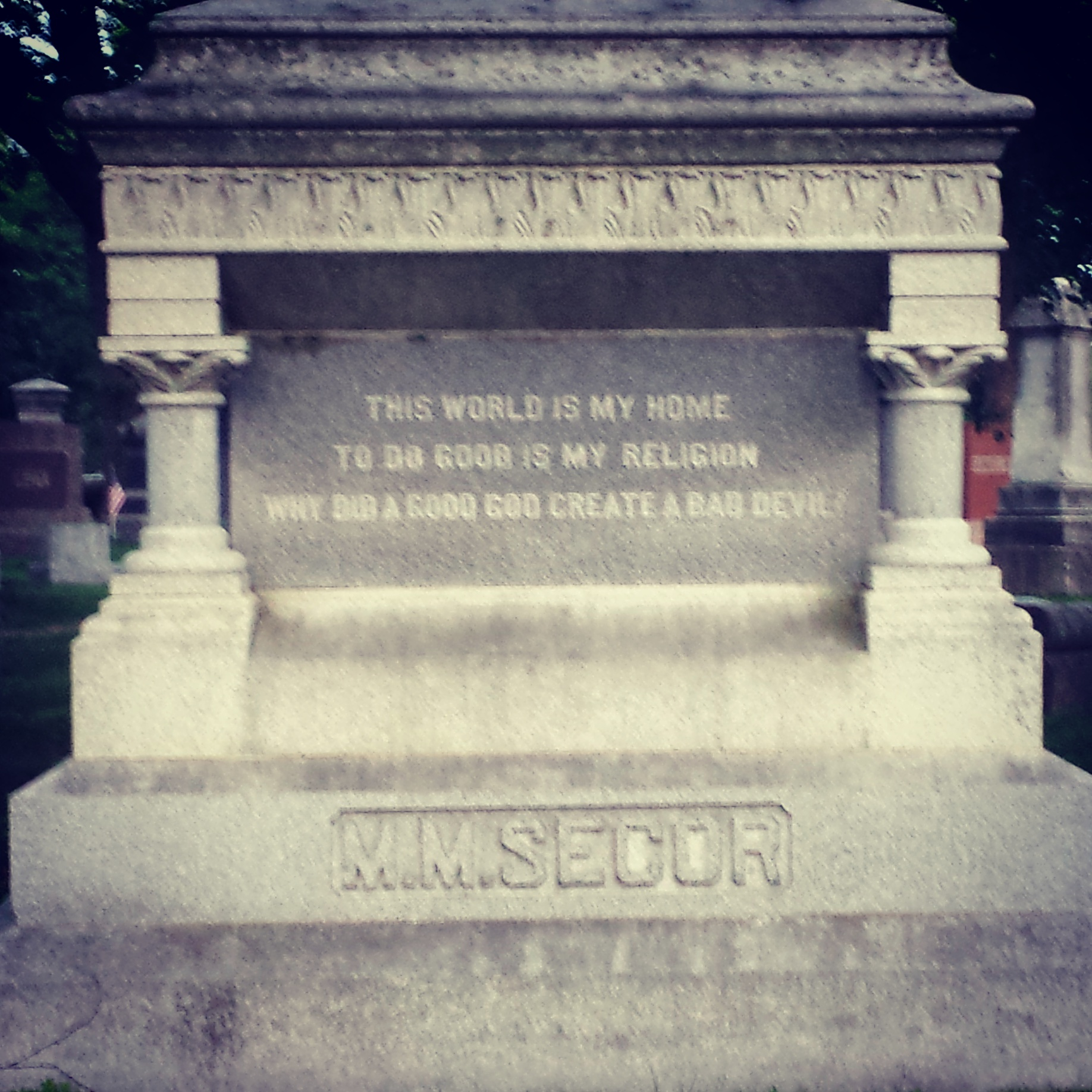
M. M. Secor gravestone

On January 5, 1911, Secor died as the result of injuries suffered during a fall on New Year's night. He had fallen getting out of bed to use the bathroom, hitting his bedpost, breaking a rib and sustaining other internal injuries.

A $2,500 granite gravestone was erected in his honor, on which an epitaph was inscribed that read: "This world is my home/ To do good is my religion/ Why did a good God make a bad Devil?" The gravestone still stands in Mound Cemetery.

== See also ==
- Trunk (luggage) for examples of trunk styles
- Martin Maier, another trunk malletier situated in Detroit

Political offices
Preceded by Titus G. Fish	Mayor of Racine, Wisconsin; 1884 – 1885	Succeeded by Joseph Miller
Preceded by Daniel A. Olin	Mayor of Racine, Wisconsin; 1888 – 1889	Succeeded by Frank L. Mitchell
