= Footlocker (luggage) =

Type of trunk or chest

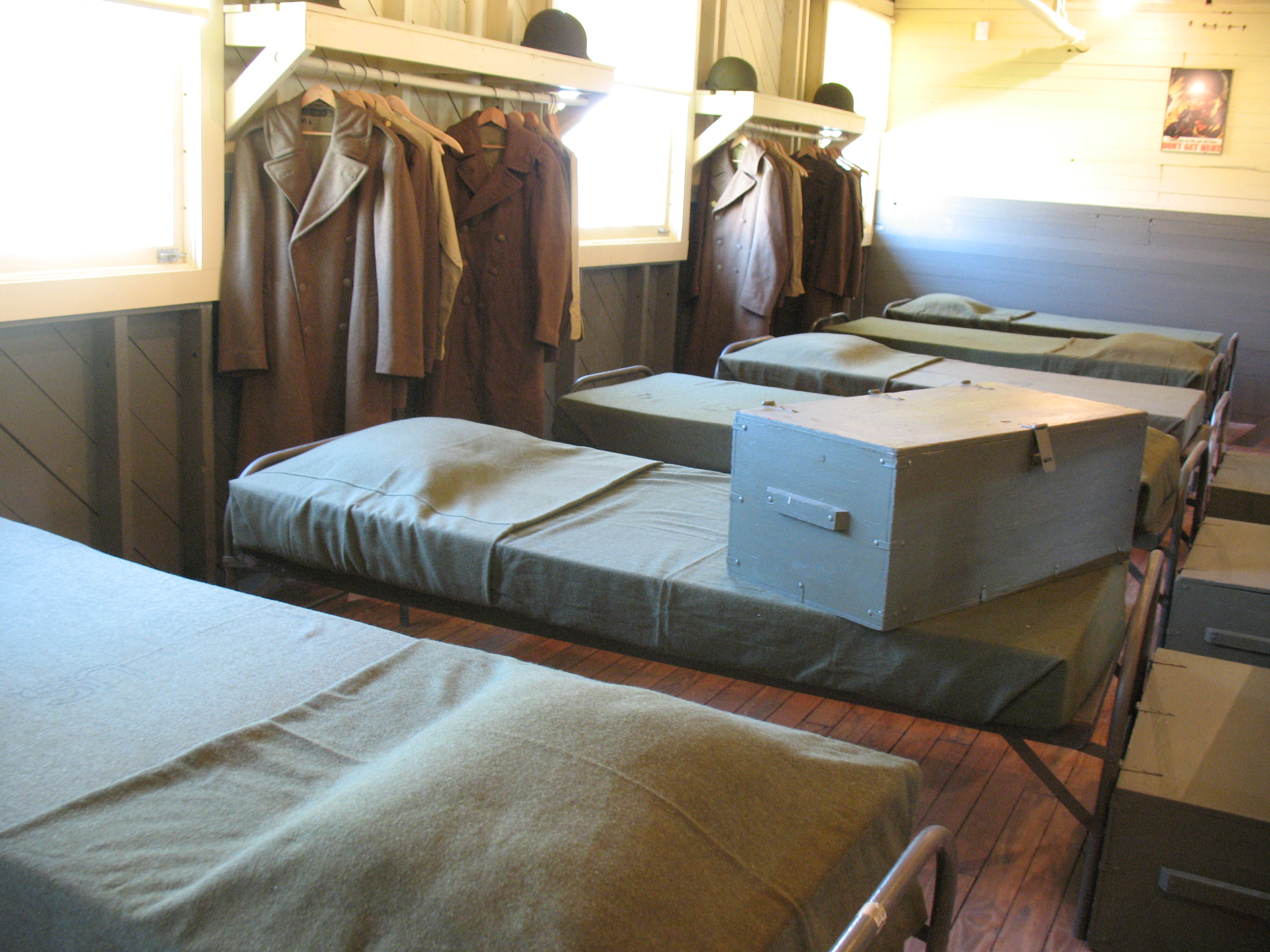
A WWII footlocker on a bed at the National Infantry Museum, South Columbus, Georgia

A footlocker is a small trunk to be placed at the foot of a bed, used to store personal belongings. They can be secured by a padlock or combination lock, and are often used by soldiers or other military personnel. The name is derived from the fact that they are typically placed at the foot of a soldier's bunk or bed. The term "footlocker" is currently used in recruit training in the United States Marine Corps.

== United States ==
Plywood footlockers are a common type of footlocker used by the U.S. Army. They generally follow similar size and designs, undergoing only minor cosmetic changes in color and materials (from 1/2-inch-thick (13 mm) plywood to 1 1/4-inch-thick (32 mm) plywood, depending on war material needs and/or desire to reduce weight and cost of manufacture and cost of shipping). The corners are reinforced with straps of metal riveted to the locker, and had thick wooden handles on both sides for lifting by hand. After World War II, the protruding wooden handles were replaced with coil ones, so that each footlocker occupied less space and could be packed together more tightly for transportation. Each footlocker came with an internal 1/4-inch-thick (6.4 mm) (or thinner) plywood tray which could store some of the smaller items used by a soldier, and the larger items were kept below the tray.

Crate footlockers were cruder than plywood footlockers in that they were either made out of old ammo and packing crates, or followed similar packing-crate designs for simplicity and expediency of manufacture.

Officer footlockers were noticeably different (especially during the World War II era) and issued to officers and some non-commissioned officers who were lucky enough to be issued or re-issued them. They were built better than the other two designs, with metal strapping along all of the corners and edges and leather handles on both sides. They were also made from better materials, and had stronger latches and fancier locks. Usually, officers were permitted to have custom drawings displayed on the outside of their footlockers.

Most footlockers are made of plywood, but starting in World War II some footlockers were made out of a form of cardboard, which evolved into pressboard, covered with adhesive paper. Such materials were used to reduce cost of manufacture, although the materials also reduced durability when exposed to water and/or humidity.

Depending on the nature of the troop movement, footlockers would be shipped when the military unit was deployed to a base. However, if the unit was simply on a training assignment, the footlockers would remain at the training barracks and each soldier would either be issued or procure his own footlocker for transporting his possessions. The soldier's name would be stencilled on the outside, along with his APO address.

Modern footlockers are used today in military installations and military academies. Sometimes referred to as trunks, the use of footlockers in the military has decreased over the years. Their largest military user is the United States Military Academy.

Also in the past few years or 3 decades. Companies that make footlockers for the military such as Seward Trunk Co. now also make civilian modelstwo-wheeled type footlockers, top handle style footlockers, and traditional side handle style footlockers.
