= Trunk (luggage) =

Type of luggage

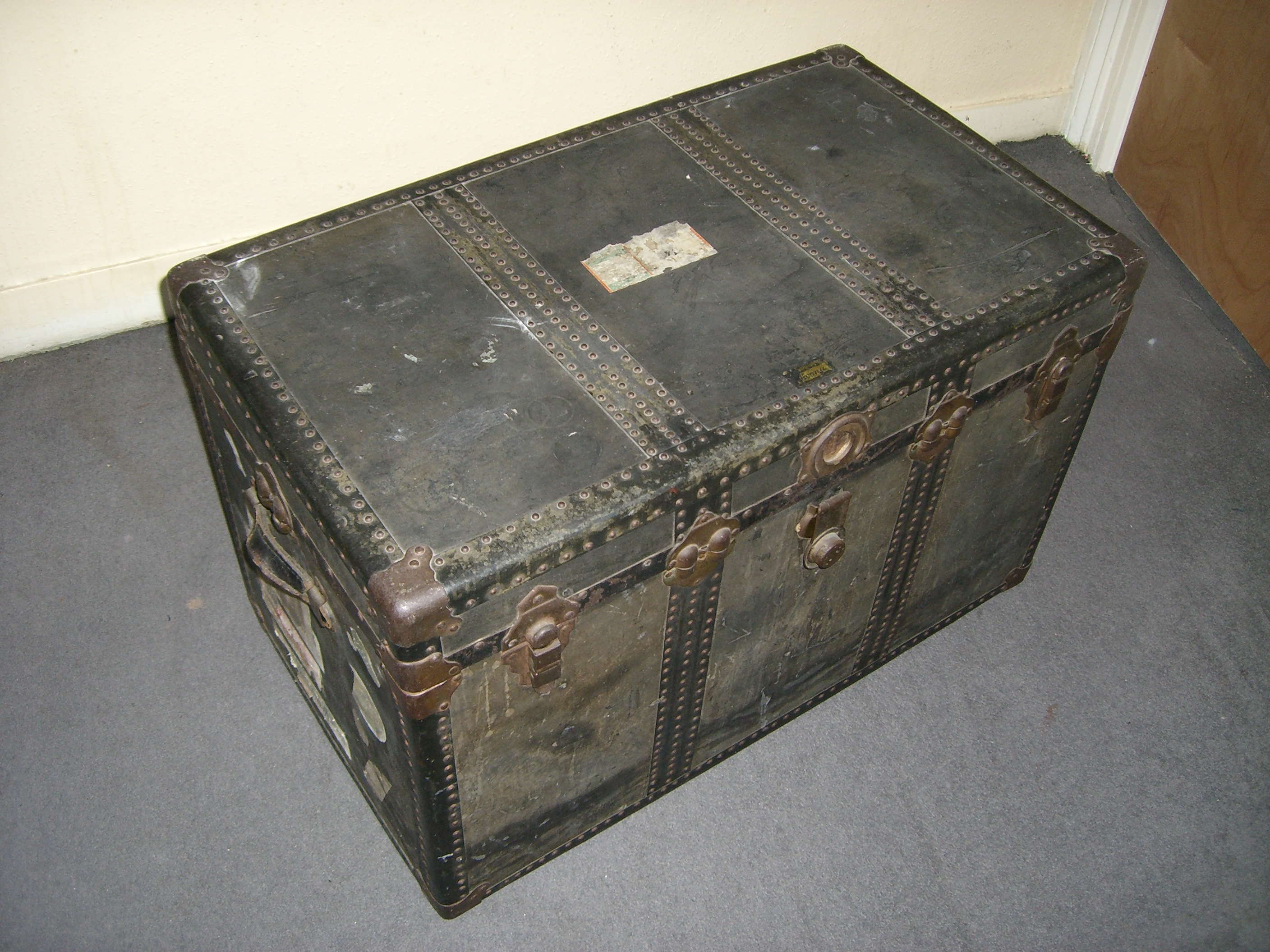
A large trunk with leather handles

A trunk, also known as a travel trunk, is a large cuboid container designed to hold clothes and other personal belongings. They are most commonly used for extended periods away from home, such as for boarding school, or long trips abroad. Trunks are differentiated from chests by their more rugged construction due to their intended use as luggage, instead of the latter's pure storage.

Among the many styles of trunks there are Jenny Lind, Saratoga, monitor, steamer or cabin, barrel-staves, octagon or bevel-top, wardrobe, dome-top, barrel-top, wall trunks, and even full dresser trunks. These differing styles often only lasted for a decade or two as well, and—along with the hardware—can be extremely helpful in dating an unmarked trunk.

== History and construction ==
Although trunks have been around for thousands of years, the most common styles seen and referred to today date from the late 18th century to the early 20th century, when they were supplanted in the market by the cost-effective and lighter suitcase.

Trunks were generally constructed with a base trunk box made of pine which was then covered with protective and decorative materials. Some of the earliest trunks are covered with studded hide or leather and look much like the furniture of the same period (which makes sense as trunk manufacturing was sometimes an offshoot of a furniture business.) Later coverings include paper, canvas, plain or embossed tin, with an uncounted assortment of hardware and hardwood slats to keep it all down. They sometimes were made with a small brass handle on top and were made in many sizes.

The use of classic trunks for luggage was widespread through the first two decades of the twentieth century but began to fade in popularity thereafter in favor of the modern suitcase. By the end of the 1940s their use had become rare and in modern times is almost unknown.

== Famous companies ==
There were hundreds of trunk manufacturers in the United States and a few of the larger and well known companies were Rhino Trunk & Case, C. A. Taylor, Haskell Brothers, Martin Maier, Romadka Bros., Goldsmith & Son, Crouch & Fitzgerald, M. M. Secor, Winship, Hartmann, Belber, Oshkosh, Seward, and Leatheroid. One of the largest American manufacturers of trunks at one point—Seward Trunk Co. of Petersburg, Virginia—still makes them for school and camp, and another company—Shwayder Trunk Company of Denver, Colorado—would eventually become Samsonite. Another is the English luxury goods manufacturer H. J. Cave trading since 1839. Their Osilite trunk was used by such famous customers as T. E. Lawrence and Ruth Vincent. Some of the better known French trunk makers were Louis Vuitton, Goyard, Moynat, and Au Départ. Only a few remain with the most prominent US companies, being Mercury Seward, Rhino Trunk & Case, and C & N Footlockers.

== Styles and manufacturers ==
The easiest way for the casual observer to date any trunk is still by examining its style, so a short description of each aforementioned major variety follows.

Jenny Lind trunks have a distinctive hour glass or keyhole shape when viewed from the side. They were named after the Swedish singer Jenny Lind.

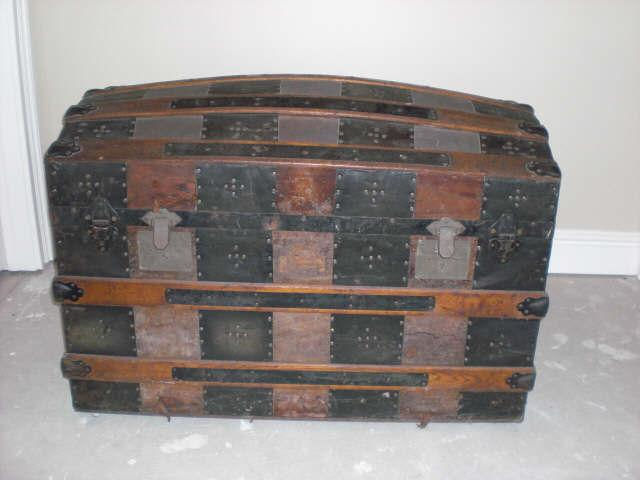
A barrel-stave Saratoga trunk with protective metal banding on each of the oak slats

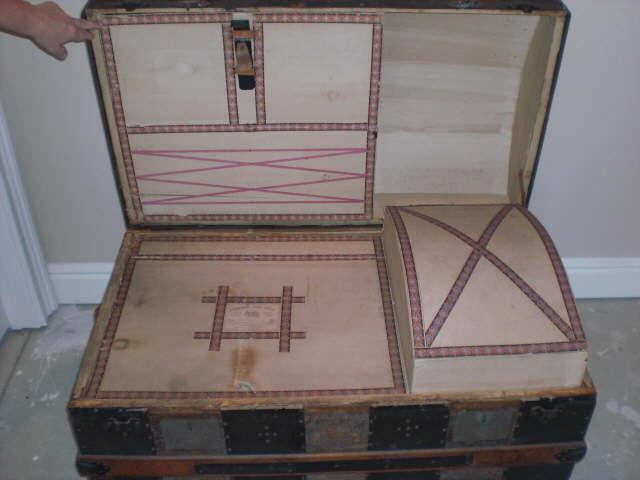
The complete tray compartments of the Saratoga trunk

Saratoga trunks were the premium trunks of many makers (or the exclusive design of many premium trunk makers) and actually can encompass nearly every other style of trunk manufactured if loosely defined, although generally they are limited to before the 1880s. The most readily recognizable feature of Saratogas are their myriad (and generally very complex) compartments, trays, and heavy duty hardware.

Monitor-tops (incorrectly known as water-fall trunks from the furniture) date from the late 1870s to the late 1910s, and are characterized by their rounded front and rear corners to form a lying-down "D" when viewed from the side. Earlier examples usually included labor-intensive hardwood slats that were curved with the top, while there was a revival much later with rarer, all-metal ones being constructed.

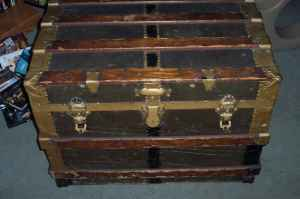
A steamer trunk dating from the late 1890s to early 1900s.

Steamer trunks (named after their location of storage in the cabin of a steam ship, or "steamer") which are sometimes referred to as flat-tops, first appeared in the late 1870s, although the greater bulk of them date from the 1880–1920 period. They are distinguished by either their flat or slightly curved tops and were usually covered in canvas, leather or patterned paper and about 14 inches (36 cm) tall to accommodate steamship luggage regulations. There has been much debate and discourse on what these types of trunks are actually called. In some old catalogs, these trunks were called "packers", and the "steamer" trunk actually referred to a trunk that is often called a cabin trunk. An orthodox name for this type of trunk would be a "packer" trunk, but since it has been widely called a steamer for so long, it is now a hallmark of this style.

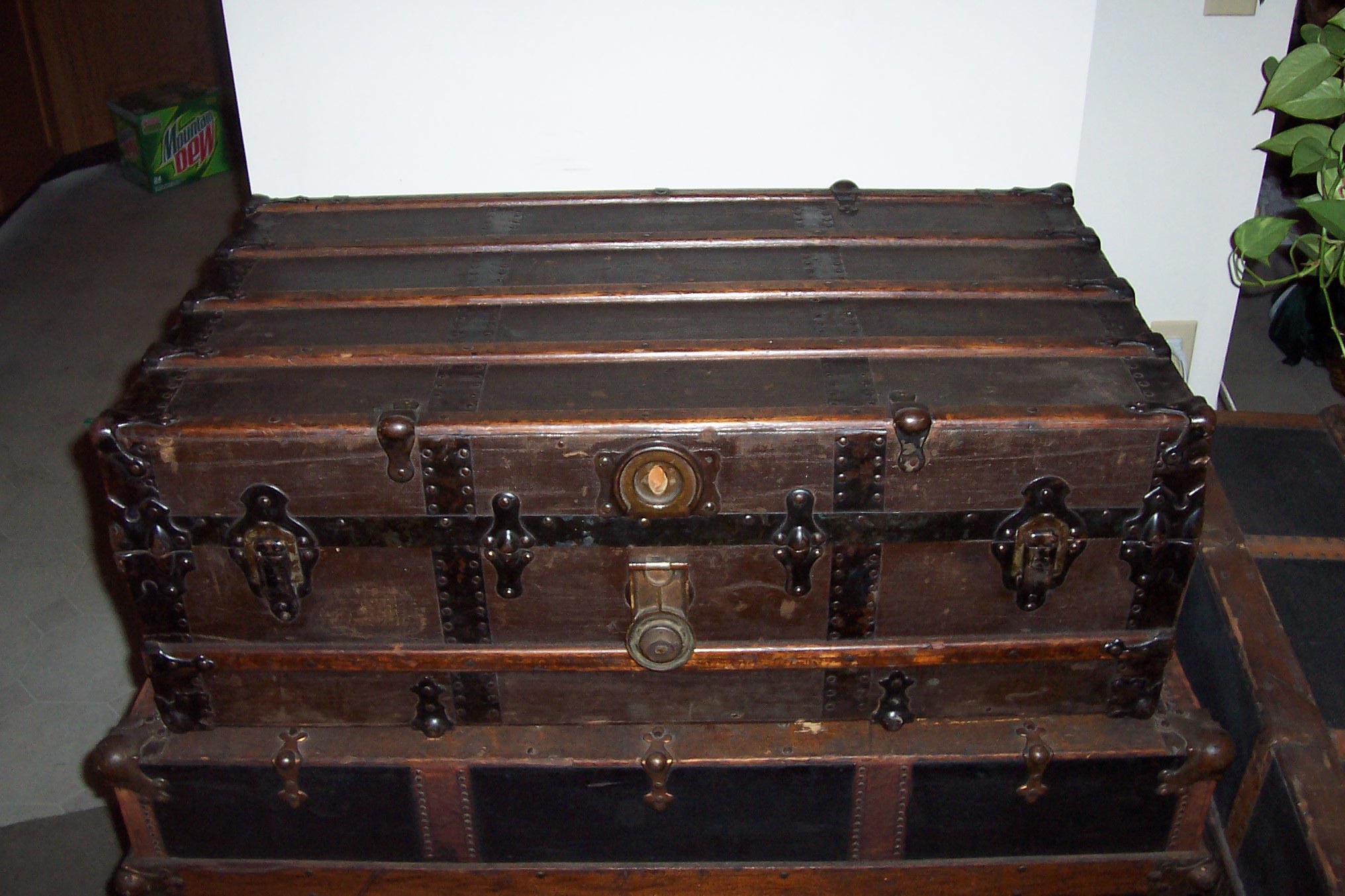
A low-profile cabin trunk from the early 1900s

Cabin trunks, which are sometimes called "true" steamer trunks, were the equivalent of today's carry-on luggage. They were low-profiled and small enough to fit under the berths of trains or in the cabin of a steamer, hence their name. Most were built with flat tops and had inner tray compartments to store the owner's valuables deemed too precious to keep stowed away in the baggage (luggage) car or ship's hold.

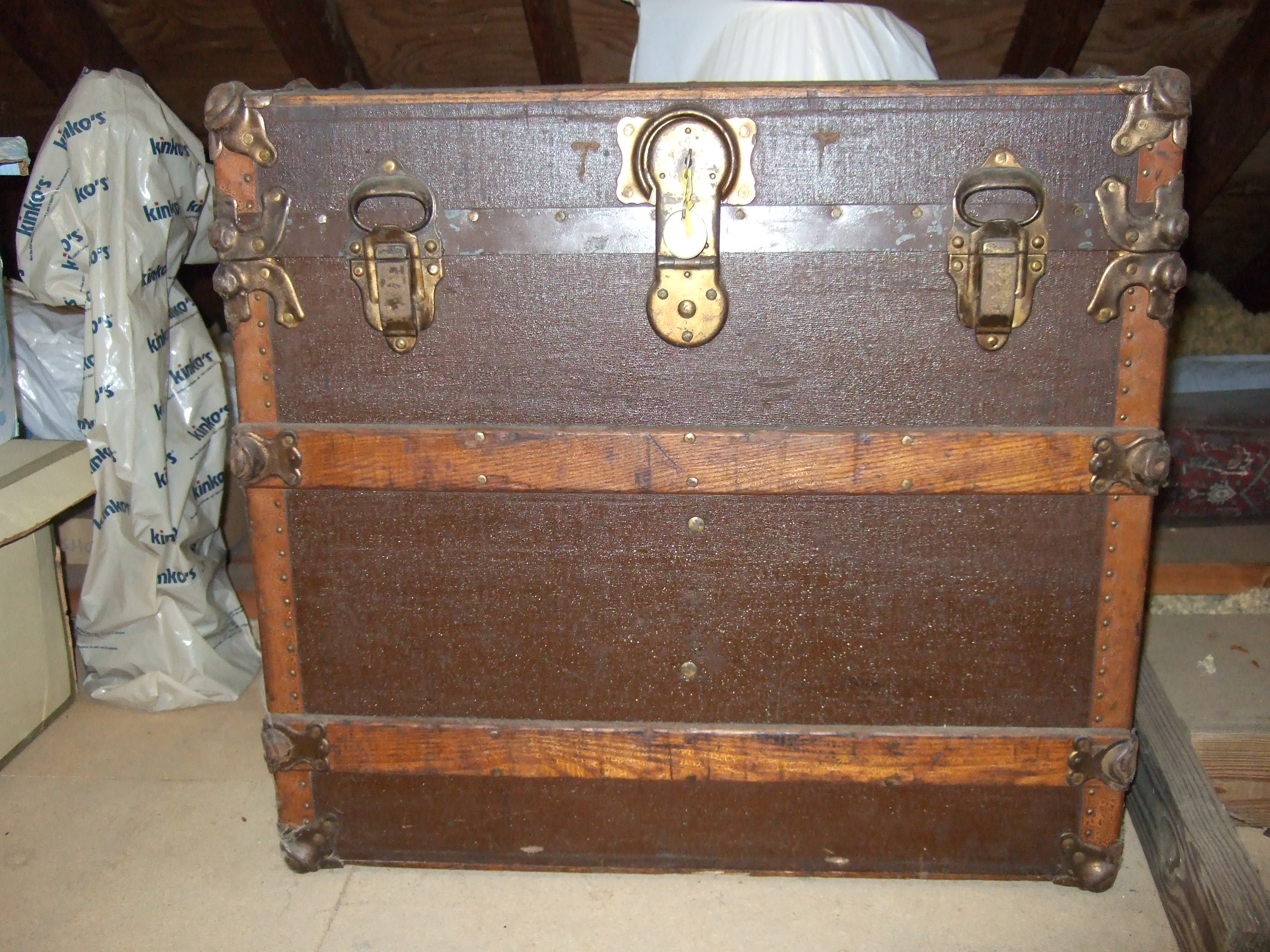
A hat trunk (box) dating from the 1890s, with "cube-shaped" construction

Hat trunks were square shaped trunks that were popular in the 1860s to the 1890s. Today, they are mostly called "half-trunks". They were smaller and easier to carry, and could hold up to six hats or bonnets. Most were flat tops, but some had domed lids (which were very elegant). This trunk style was popular with Victorian women, hence antique trunk labels often calling this type a "ladies' trunk". Hat trunks generally sell for more than any other average trunk style because they are smaller and are rather rare to find.

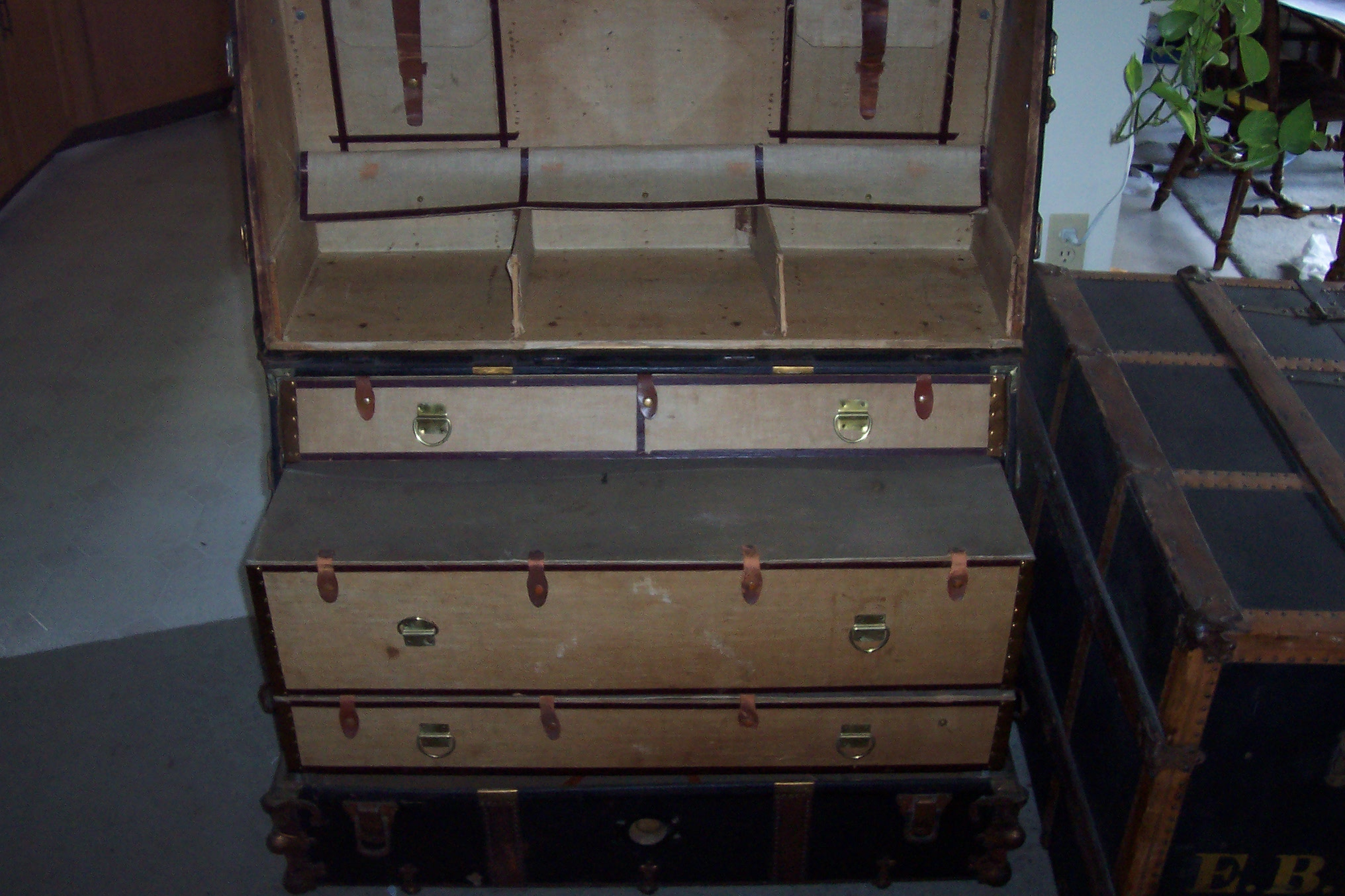
An example of a barrel-stave trunk

Barrel-staves are sometimes referred to as a form of dome-top trunk, but generally date from a decade or more earlier and are notable for having horizontal slats instead of vertical, giving it a distinctive look and construction. These were generally made from the late 1870s to the mid-1880s.

Bevel-tops are separated into an early and a late (or revival) period, the former generally dating from the 1870–1880 period, and the latter from 1890 to 1900. They are characterized by a distinct trapezoidal shape when viewed from the side, although the earlier period tended to have a much shorter flattened top section than the later did. These tend to be extremely rare, although are not as popular or sought after as many of the other varieties.

Wardrobe trunks generally must be stood on end to be opened and have drawers on one side and hangers for clothes on the other. Many of the better wardrobe lines also included buckles/tie-downs for shoes, removable suitcases/briefcases, privacy curtains, mirrors, make-up boxes, and just about anything else imaginable. These are normally very large and heavy as they were used for extended travel by ship or train. Rhino Trunk and Case, Inc. still manufactures many styles of wardrobe trunks at their Rochester, NY facility.

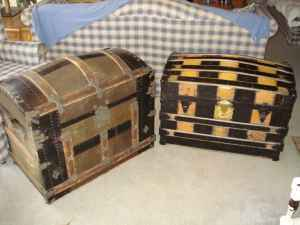
Two examples of dome-top trunks: one is a vertical slat trunk, the other is a barrel-stave trunk

A dome-top trunk has a high, curved top that can rise up to heights of 25–30 in (64–76 cm). A variety of construction methods—including cuffing, molded ply, barrel construction, and so forth—were used to form the inner boxes. Included in this classification are camel-backs, which are distinguished by having a central, vertically running top slat that is higher than its fellows, hunch-backs or hump-backs which is the same but has no slat in the center of the top, and barrel-tops (not to be confused with barrel staves), which have high arching slats that are all the same height, a distinction that can be discerned by laying a ruler flat across the tops of the slats. These trunks date from 1870s-1900s, although there are a few shops still manufacturing them today. They are not only the most common trunks referred to as antique, but also are among the most popular.

Wall trunks are made with a special hinges so that when opened the trunk could still be put flat up against a wall. The two main manufacturers include Clinton and Miller, which can be easily noted by the name on the hinges. In good condition these are comparatively sought-after trunks for a specialty type, although are in the middling range when it comes to price.

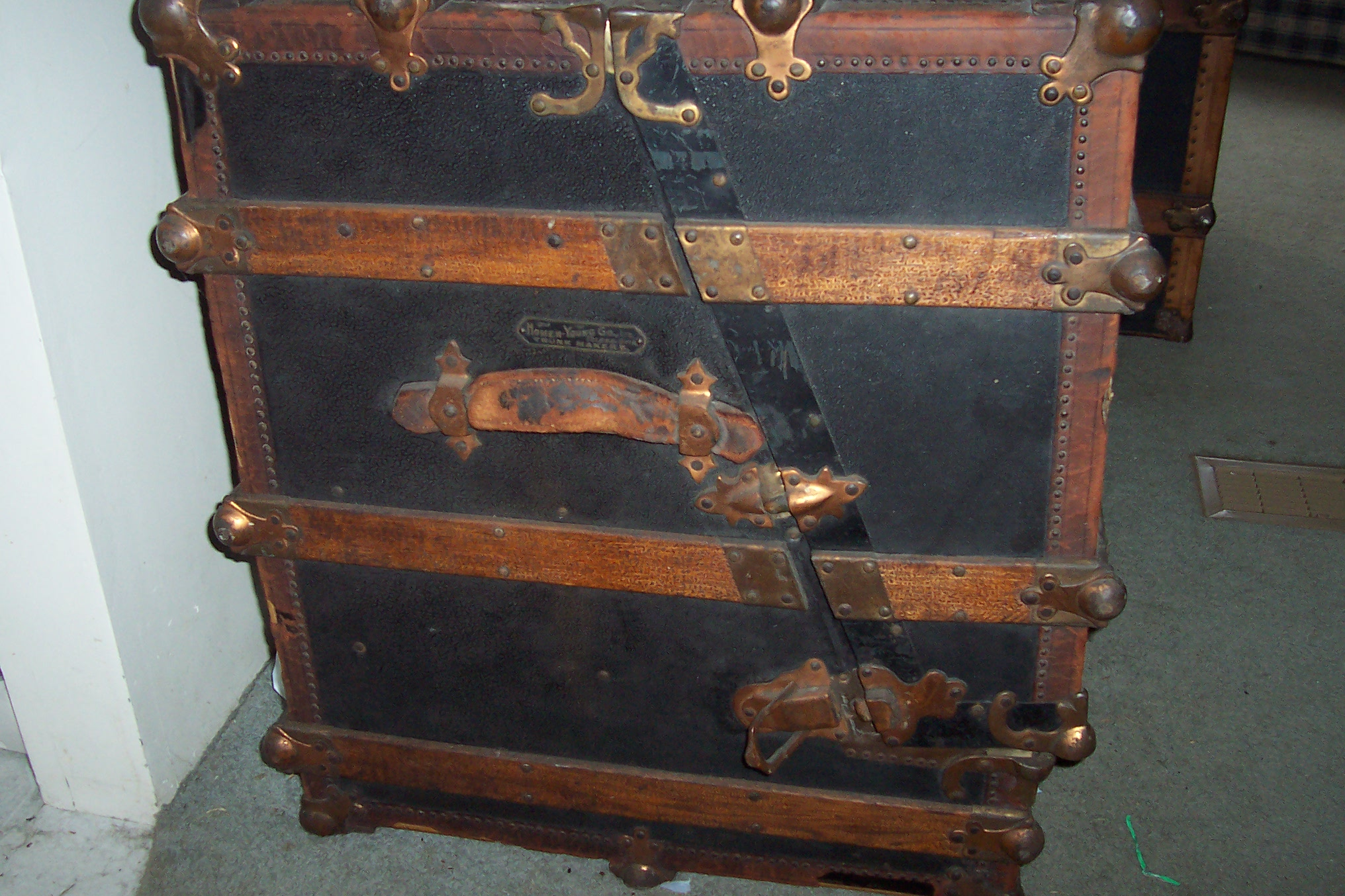
A Homer Young dresser (theatrical) trunk

Dresser trunks also known as pyramidal trunks, due to their shape, are a unique form of wall-trunk that generally date from the 1900–1910 era. They are characterized by a lid that opens up nearly the entire front half of the trunk, allowing it to rest on the bottom. Two prominent manufacturers of this trunk style were F. A. Stallman and Homer Young & Co.

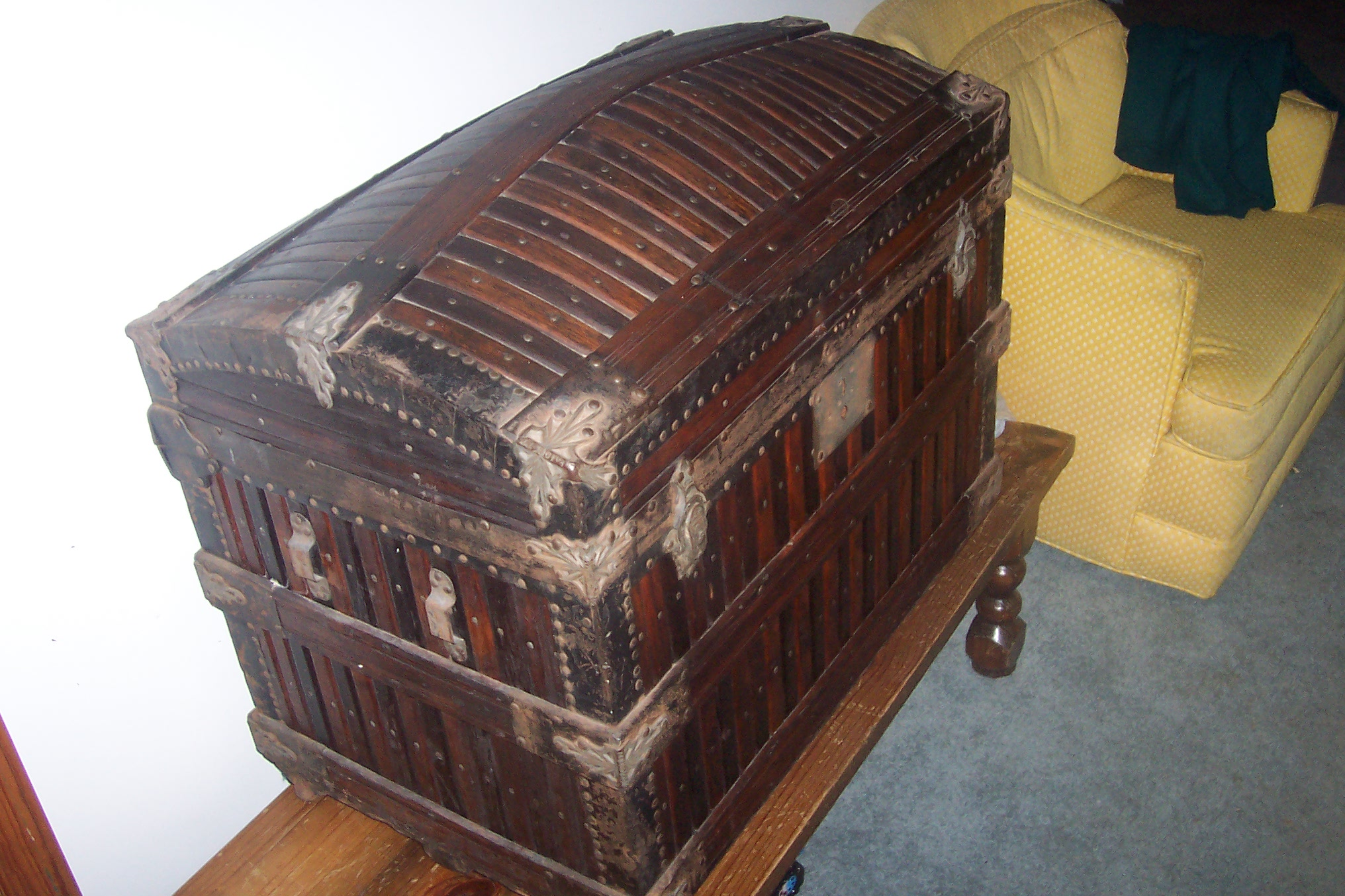
A Martin Maier oak-slat trunk

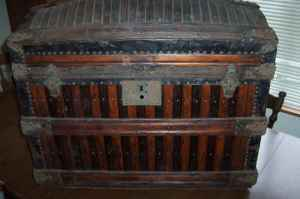
Front-view of the Martin Maier oak-slat trunk

Oak-slat trunks incorporating many construction-styles (e.g. dome-top, flat-top, beveled-top) were built on a wooden frame, where the malletier would fit thin oak slats vertically side-by-side until the entire trunk was covered. To a Victorian, this would show the complexity of the trunk and astuteness of the malletier, and was an indication of wealth to any purchaser. Oak-slat trunks were built by several companies, including the Excelsior Company, MM (Martin Maier) Company, Clinton Wall Trunk Manufactory, and El Paso Slat Trunk Company. Some oak-slat trunks were made with alternating colors on the vertical slats.

Footlockers are trunk-like pieces of luggage used in military contexts. Generally these are designed for economy, ruggedness, and ease of transport rather than aesthetic qualities.

During the steamer trunk restoration process when the inside paper covering is removed, dated notes in lead pencil made by the original craftsman may be found, as well as the circular saw blade impressions made on the rough-cut wood at the saw mill, both of which give added character and value to the restored trunk.

== Types of tray compartments ==
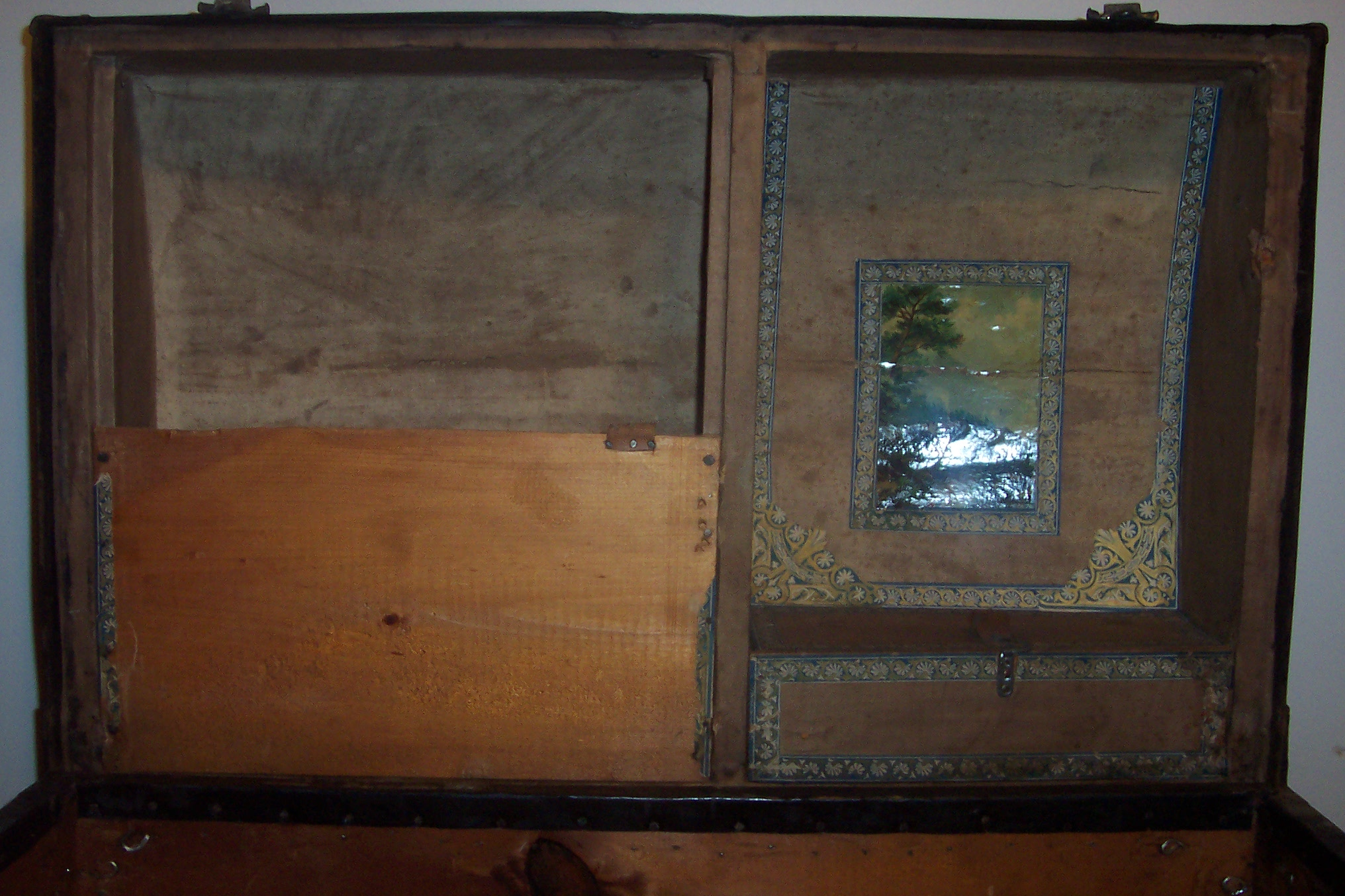
Most common lid compartment layout. There is a coin box, a drop-down compartment, and one chromolithograph. The lid to the big compartment would have had another lithograph.

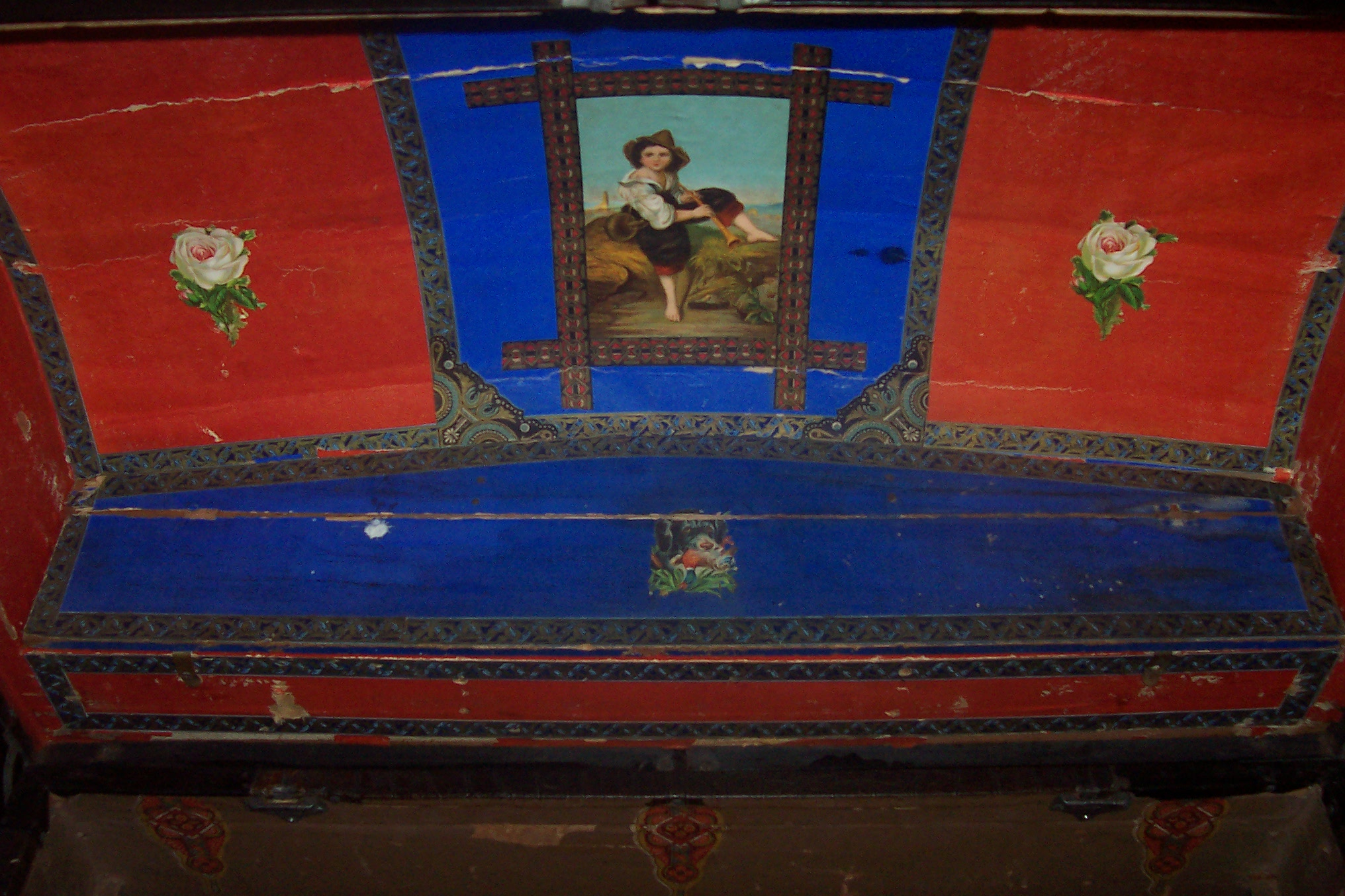
The parasol compartment beneath the "Little Boy Blue" chromolithograph

There were numerous tray and lid compartments in Victorian trunks, ranging from basic to complex. A basic tray system comprised a hat box, a shirt compartment, a coin box, and a document box. A complex tray system, however, could consist two hat boxes, several other shirt compartments, a coin box, several document boxes and even secret compartments strategically placed so that people of unwanted access would pass up if not wary. Beautiful lithographs would be placed over the lids or dome of the trunk and truly capture the Victorian aesthetic of that day. There were numerous chromolithographs that a trunk maker could use, and they could be indicative of who the trunk was intended for, such as ladies or men. A bride's chest usually had a lot of floral pictures or lithographs of other ladies, while men's had pictures of "village" or country scenes. It was up to the malletier what to put on the lids and trays.

== See also ==
- Chest (furniture)
- Suitcase
- Martin Maier, a trunk maker in Detroit (1865–1915)
- M. M. Secor, a trunk maker in Racine, Wisconsin
- Sljeme (company)
