= English trunk =

The so-called English trunk (a.k.a. Railway Basket) is a wicker trunk that was invented in England around 1839 by H.J. Cave. The trunk was invented as a means of making luggage lighter for railway travel. The trunk was originally used to transport linen, bedding, clothing and pique-niques.

== Histoire ==
This type of trunk first appeared around 1839. In some historical documents of the time it is referred to as a “railway basket” due to its wicker structure. Modeled on the style of English chests – which explains its more common name "the English trunk" – it is made up of a wicker frame covered first in leather then potentially a canvas making it waterproof.

The construction of this trunk called on the involvement of specialist basket-makers and leather craftsmen. This extra light trunk (it weighed as little as 2 kg) was seen as an alternative to the heavier items of luggage made of traditional wood and leather. Wicker and sealed canvas gradually replaced the use of leather, and the invention of the trunk was commonly used in rail travel. In the early 1900s the decline in rail travel coupled with the invention of fiberboard suitcases led to the decline in use of the railway basket.
