= Seward Trunk Co. =

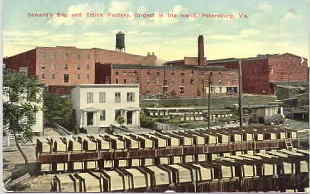
- Company type: Luggage Manufacturer
- Industry: Travel goods
- Founded: 1878
- Headquarters: Petersburg, Virginia
- Products: trunks, hat trunks, foot lockers, luggage.
- Website: sewardtrunks.com

Seward Trunk Co. was one of USA's largest manufacturer of steamers, trunks, footlockers, and other luggage. It was based in Petersburg, Virginia.

== History ==
Seward Trunk and Bag was founded in 1878 by Simon Seward. He died in 1912 and his sons took over the business until it was sold to Mercury Luggage.

In 1967, Seward was purchased by the Dayco Corporation, the former Dayton Rubber Company, of Dayton, Ohio.

In 1970, Seward manufactured the trunks that carried the NASA's moon rocks across the world.

The company is now a unit of Advantus, Corp. of Jacksonville, Florida which purchased the former owner, Mercury Luggage(also of Jacksonville) in 2016. Seward trunks are sold by fine retailers throughout the USA.

The former Seward luggage factory at 422-424 High Street in Petersburg is on the National Register of Historic Places and was under renovation for residences, the first of which opened in 2006.

The second phase of the project would have included both residential and commercial space.

On January 16, 2018, at 5 a.m, the old building suffered a massive fire and burned down.
