= Alone in the World =

Alone in the World may refer to:

- Alone in the World (Bouguereau), a c. 1867 painting by William-Adolphe Bouguereau
- Alone in the World (film), a 1952 French film
- "Alone in the World" (Fringe), a television episode
- Alone in the World (novel) or Sans Famille, an 1878 novel by Hector Malot
- Alone in the World (1881 painting) 1881 Oil-on-canvas painting by Dutch artist Jozef Israëls
- Paul Alone in the World a 1942 children's book by Jens Sigsgaard.
