= Riding Donkeys on the Beach =

Painting by Isaac Israëls

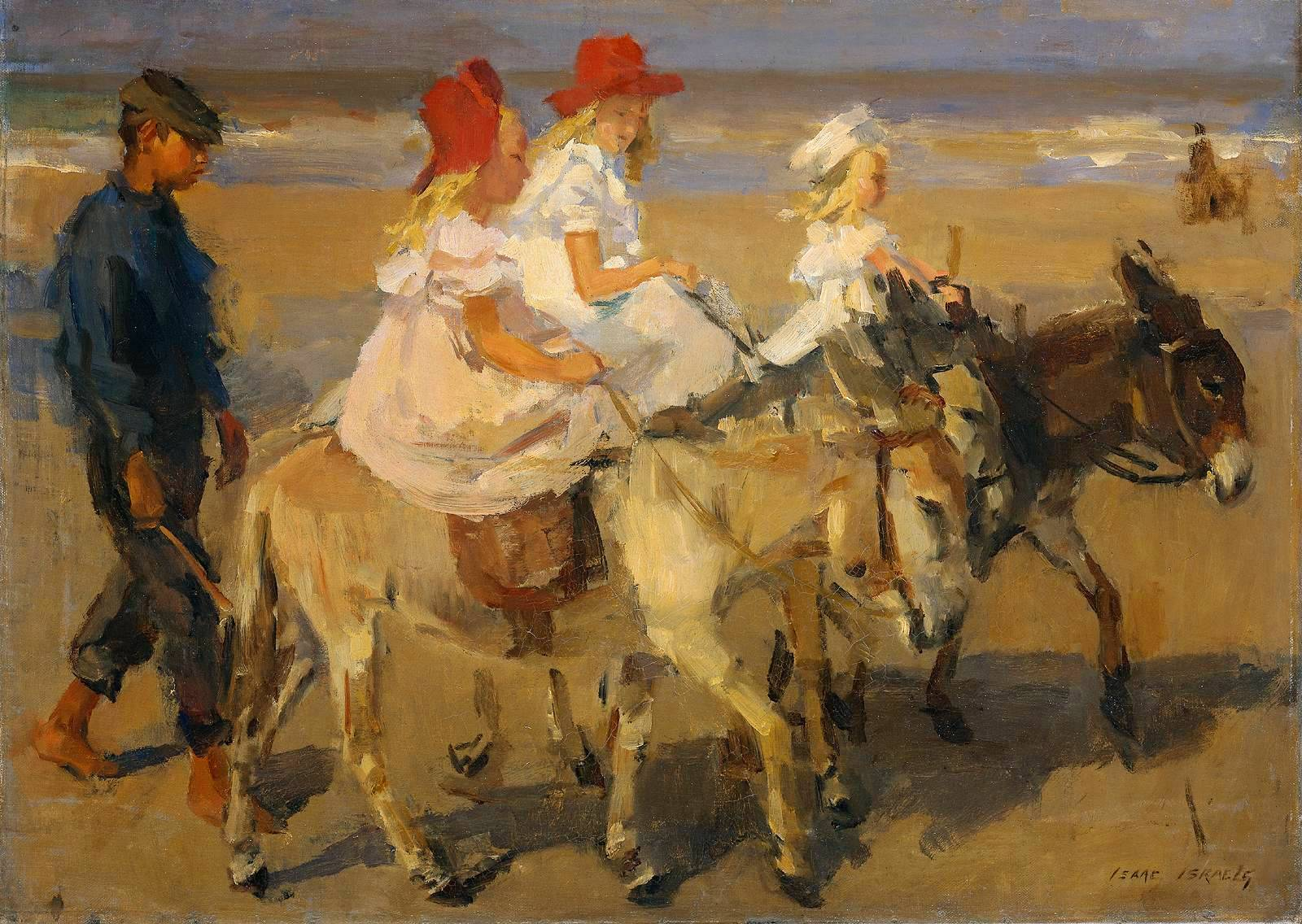
- Artist: Isaac Israëls
- Year: c.1898-1900
- Medium: canvas, oil paint
- Dimensions: 51 cm (20 in) × 70 cm (28 in)
- Location: Rijksmuseum
- Collection: Collection Drucker-Fraser, Rijksmuseum, Rijksmuseum
- Accession no.: SK-A-3597
- Identifiers: RKDimages ID: 21394

Riding Donkeys on the Beach or The Donkey Ride is an oil on canvas painting executed by the Dutch artist Isaac Israëls, created c. 1898-1900. It is held in the Rijksmuseum, in Amsterdam.

== History ==
Israëls lived in Amsterdam since 1886, but from the mid-1890s he often returned to The Hague, where his father Jozef Israëls lived, for the Summer. He usually rented a villa at the Oranjehotel in Scheveningen, where he would stay. Isaac was particularly attracted by the cheerful life at the beach during that season and enjoyed the alternating light of the sun and the sea. During this period he created the airy, loosely sketched paintings of children riding donkeys, which would eventually become characteristic of his impressionist style.

== Description ==
The current painting shows three little girls riding donkeys along the waterline, they wear matlotjes on their heads, and are followed by a caretaker in a blue smock. The children were from some of his acquaintances: from left to right, they are Agatha, Suze and a younger sister of Agatha. Israëls tries to capture the carefree atmosphere of the sunny day, with the summer wind, the warm light and the sound of the waves. Donkey riding on the beach was a popular pastime at the time.

The painting reflects Israëls' preoccupation with the representation of sunlight. The subject seems almost coincidental. It is primarily an impression of a Summer moment, depicted with loose, almost sketchy brushstrokes, and not much emphasis on the portraiture. Israëls often painted quickly. He once said: "Above all, don't work too much", "not for more than two hours at a time, don't fiddle too long, then you're not fresh anymore".

Despite the casual nature of the subject, Israëls made several other works with the same theme. Sometimes they give the impression of studies. Nevertheless, these works would later become his best known works and thus from the impressionist painting in the Netherlands.

== Provenance ==
The painting belonged to the Draker-Fraser private collection, in London, until being bequeathed to the Rijksmuseum, in 1944.
