= Jan Kooi =

Military officer from Ghana

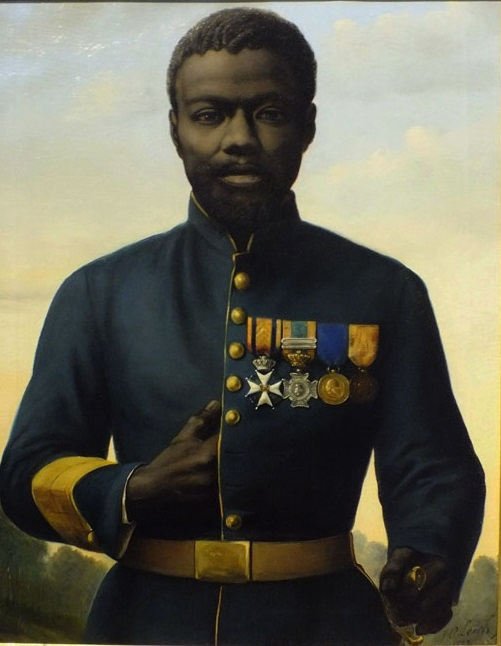
- Born: c.1840s Elmina (presumably)
- Died: after 1884; Elmina (presumably)

Jan Kooi (c. 1840 – after 1884) was a Dutch KNIL (Royal Netherlands East Indies Army) military officer from Ghana.

Kooi was probably born somewhere near Elmina, where the KNIL recruited him. No records of his birth/death dates exist, and his (Dutch) name was probably given to him upon recruitment. He is best known today for his portrait painted by Johan Conrad Leich in 1882 when Kooi was back in the Netherlands. He is proudly wearing his four Dutch service medals, the most prominent being the leftmost one, Knight of the Fourth Class of the Military Order of William, which he received in 1878 for his service in the Second Aceh Expedition, part of the Aceh War. The portrait remained in the possession of Leich who bequeathed it to the Museum Bronbeek. Kooi's colleagues were also portrayed by other Dutch painters at the time, most notably Kees Pop (again, probably a Dutch name given him by the Elmina recruiters):

== Portraits ==
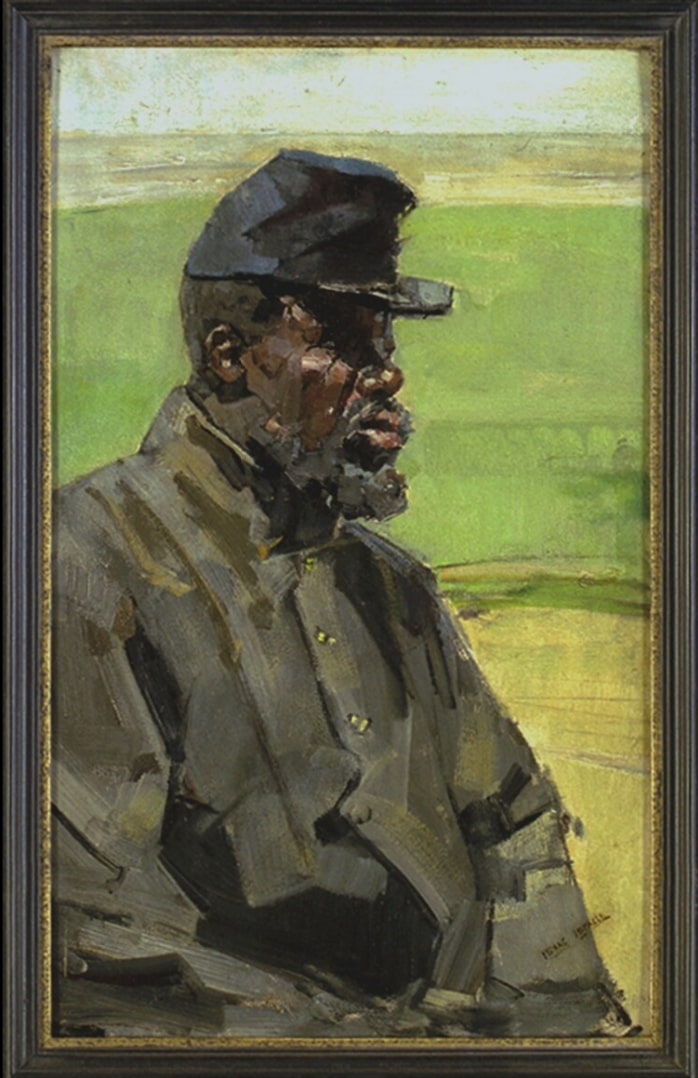
Portrait of an African soldier of the Royal Netherlands East Indies Army, probably Jan Kooi, by Isaac Israëls

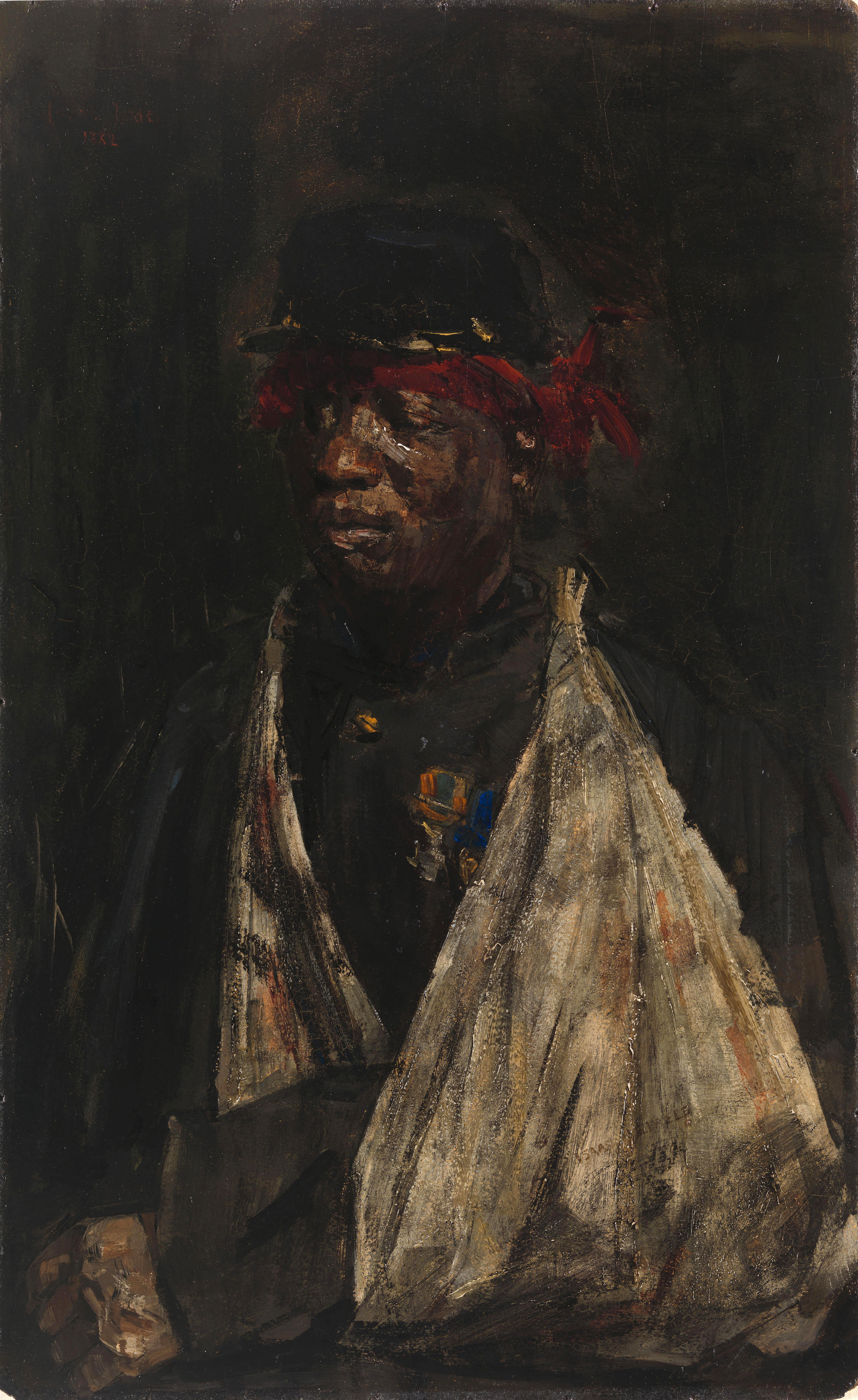
Portrait of a Wounded KNIL Soldier, 'Kees Pop', by Isaac Israëls

Both portraits show the military honors of the Expedition Cross and the Aceh Medal, and they featured in the 2008 exhibition in the Amsterdam Nieuwe Kerk called "Black is beautiful, Rubens tot Dumas". The exhibition sparked a national conversation about the Aceh expedition survivors, and the journalist Griselda Molemans later wrote books, made documentaries, and founded a society to gather all the claims by survivors of the KNIL against the Dutch state. Apparently "recruitment" was a euphemism for the manner in which the men were conscripted to KNIL in Elmina. In addition, it is very strange that there was no compensation after the war for services rendered.

== KNIL officers given special citizenship ==
Since the Elmina recruits were being sent to help suppress rebellion in the Dutch colony of Aceh, it was important to give them Dutch citizenship, but they were given a special status of "Zwarte Hollander" or Orang Belanda Hitam. Kooi and Pop probably returned to Elmina soon after their portraits were painted.
