= Shop Window (Israëls) =

Painting by Isaac Israëls

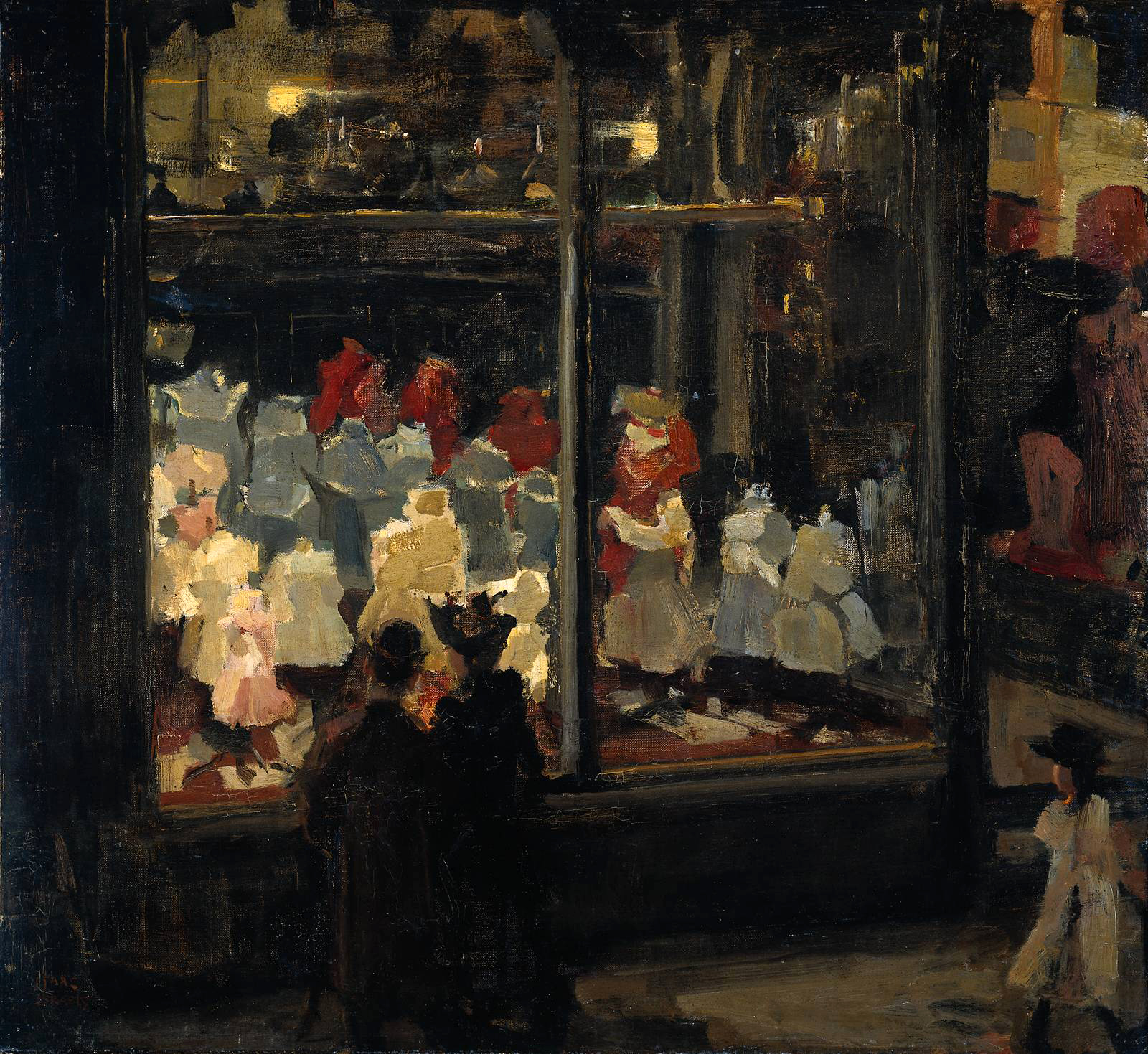
- Artist: Isaac Israëls
- Year: c. 1894-1898
- Medium: Oil-on-canvas
- Dimensions: 59 cm × 64 cm (23 in × 25 in)
- Location: Rijksmuseum, Amsterdam

Shop Window is an oil on canvas painting by the Dutch artist Isaac Israëls, from c. 1894-1898. It depicts a street scene with passers-by viewing the window of a fashion store. The work is held in the Rijksmuseum, in Amsterdam. It is part of the legacy of the art collectors couple Drucker-Fraser.

== History ==
Like fellow Impressionist George Hendrik Breitner, Israëls was fascinated by urban street life since he arrived in Amsterdam in 1886. Initially, however, he was reluctant to paint 'en plein air' there. He almost always worked indoors, in his studio or in other enclosed spaces, even when depicting street scenes. For instance, in 1893, specifically for his work, he rented a small room above a haberdashery shop on Amsterdam's Nieuwendijk, from which he painted, among other things, the Mars hat shop located opposite. A version of the brightly lit shop at night, featuring casual passers-by and a small group of people viewing the shop window, can be seen in the Groninger Museum.

Although Israëls had applied for a permit to paint outdoors as early as 1891, he did not actually go out into the street to work until 1894, as evidenced by some newspaper reports from then, which stated that curious onlookers had to be kept at a distance by a police officer. Perhaps that was what Israëls had always feared and possibly the reason why he did not immediately fully commit to it in the following time.

The Shop Window, probably created between 1894 and 1898, was also painted 'indoors' and conceived in a similar manner to the painting of Mars's hat shop: still from the window of the room he had rented opposite on the Nieuwendijk. The shop window depicted here was situated to the right of that of the hat shop, as can also be deduced from the viewpoint.

== Description ==
The current painting shows the brightly lit display window of the children's clothing store Bahlmann & Co at night, from the viewpoint of the opposite room on the first floor rented by Israëls. An interested couple is seen looking at the stock and offers; from the right, a girl seems to walk into the painting as if in a 'snapshot'.

The composition is highly sketchy, seemingly painted quickly, in large areas of color with bright accents. The dresses are neatly arranged by color, creating diagonal strips of red, light blue, and white. The light reflected in the window and the luminous clothing contrast sharply with the dark surroundings and figures, making the items appear all the more attractive, as belonging to a nearly unattainable dream world.

The work is painted in Israëls' typical loose, impressionistic style. It aims to depict a fleeting, accidental moment, an impression, as the Impressionists sought. The influence of photography is also recognizable, as is the kinship with the work of Breitner, who also had an interest for cityscapes at night. Much attention is paid to the effects of the then newly installed gas lighting and the artificially lit shop windows, which were just making their appearance in the city at the time. Both painters thus gave a new twist to a Dutch tradition that had existed for centuries, the night scene, but this time with the artificial light of progress.

== The artist and fashion ==
Israëls' interest in shop windows and fashion stores cannot be considered entirely coincidental. He is said to have always felt particularly drawn to the fashion world. Around 1900, for example, he depicted various activities at the Hirsch & Cie fashion house on Leidseplein, commissioned by the owner. Through Hirsch's mediation, he was also allowed to go to Paris in 1903 to paint at the large fashion house Paquin on the Rue de la Paix. Later, he also painted there for the Décoroll fashion house on the Place de l'Opera. This provided him with a wealth of subjects. The painting Essayeuses, in the Dordrechts Museum, is a fine example of this. For Israëls, the fashion world was a kind of dream world that could elevate and brighten the drabness of everyday life. It made life lighter and more cheerful, and that was precisely what Israëls tried to convey in his work.
