= Woman in Profile in Front of Van Gogh's Sunflowers =

Painting by Isaac Israëls

- Vrouw, en profil voor de zonnebloemen van Van Gogh (Dutch)
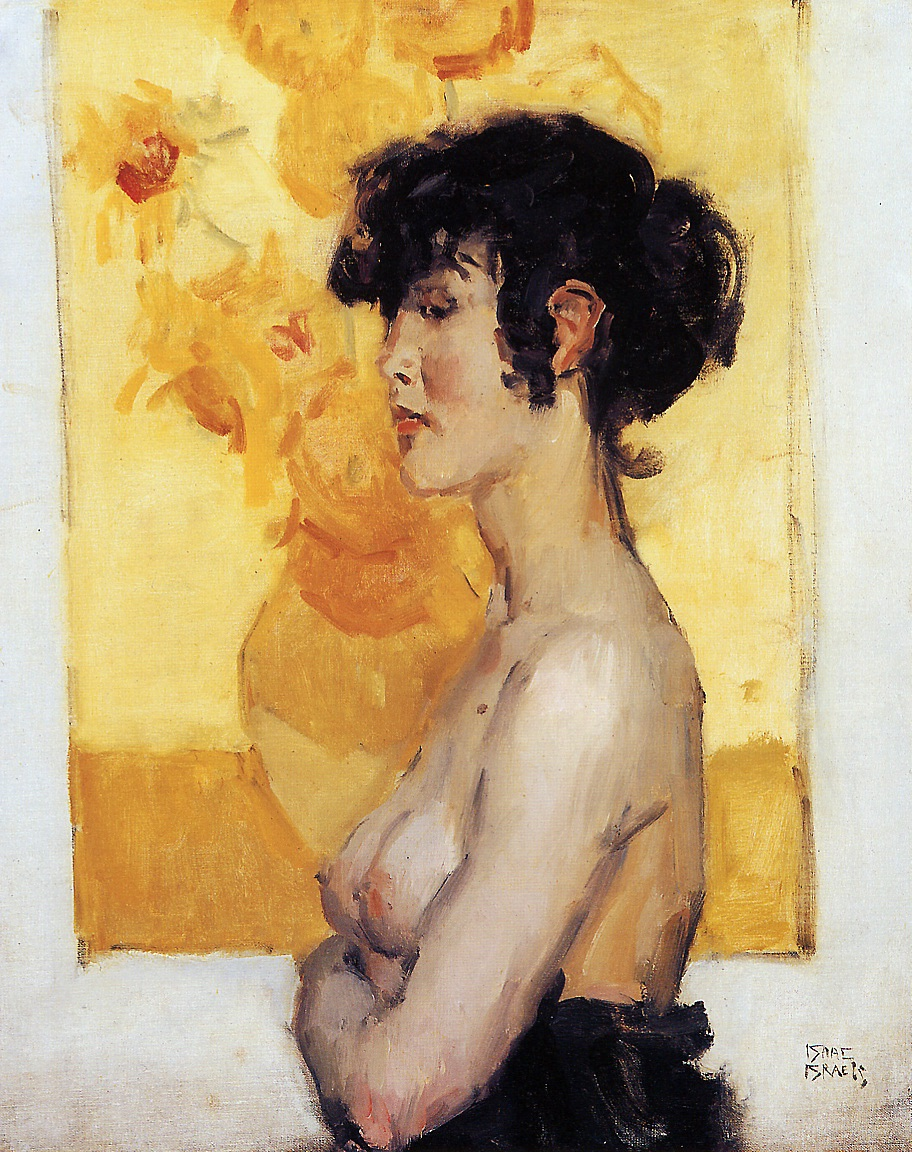
- Artist: Isaac Israëls
- Year: 1918
- Medium: Oil-on-canvas
- Dimensions: 70 cm × 55 cm (28 in × 22 in)
- Location: Museum de Fundatie, Zwolle

Woman in Profile in Front of Van Gogh's Sunflowers is an oil on canvas painting by the Dutch painter Isaac Israëls, from 1918. It depicts a bare-chested female model in front of a version of Vincent van Gogh's Sunflowers. It is held at the Museum de Fundatie, in Zwolle.

== History and description ==
In 1917, after much hesitation, Isaac Israëls moved into his father Jozef's former studio in The Hague. He had just been loaned two paintings by Van Gogh from Johanna van Gogh-Bonger, the widow of Vincent's brother Theo van Gogh. They were one his famous series Sunflowers, now held in the National Gallery, in London, and The Yellow House in Arles, where he lived, now in the Van Gogh Museum, in Amsterdam. Isaac had requested to borrow these works in order to study Vincent's intense use of colour. At the same time, when the paintings where in his studio, he used them as a background for some of his own work.

In Woman in Profile in Front of Van Gogh's Sunflowers, Israëls depicts a brunette young woman who poses as a Javanese dancer, with a bare torso in front of the version of the Sunflowers. The model probably came from the circle of friends of the Javanese prince and dancer Raden Mas Jodjana (1893–1972), who had come to the Netherlands to study and end up making a name for himself as a dancer. In 1915, he became friends with Israëls, who would also portray him several times, often in Javanese regalia. At the end of 1921, on Jodjana's advice, Israëls traveled to the Dutch East Indies to draw and paint there for over a year.

The current painting is primarily intended as a study in contrasts, but also shows Israëls' admiration for Van Gogh's' French work, which was not yet widely appreciated at the time in the Netherlands. Nevertheless, he does not copy Van Gogh's work, but uses the same colours in his typical impressionist style, with his characteristic broad and flat brushstroke. The careful drawing of the model his particularly striking, which gives this work a special place within his oeuvre.

Israëls made a large number of works where this painting appears in the background. In Homage to Van Gogh, his model, dressed in a blue blouse, looks attentively at the painting.

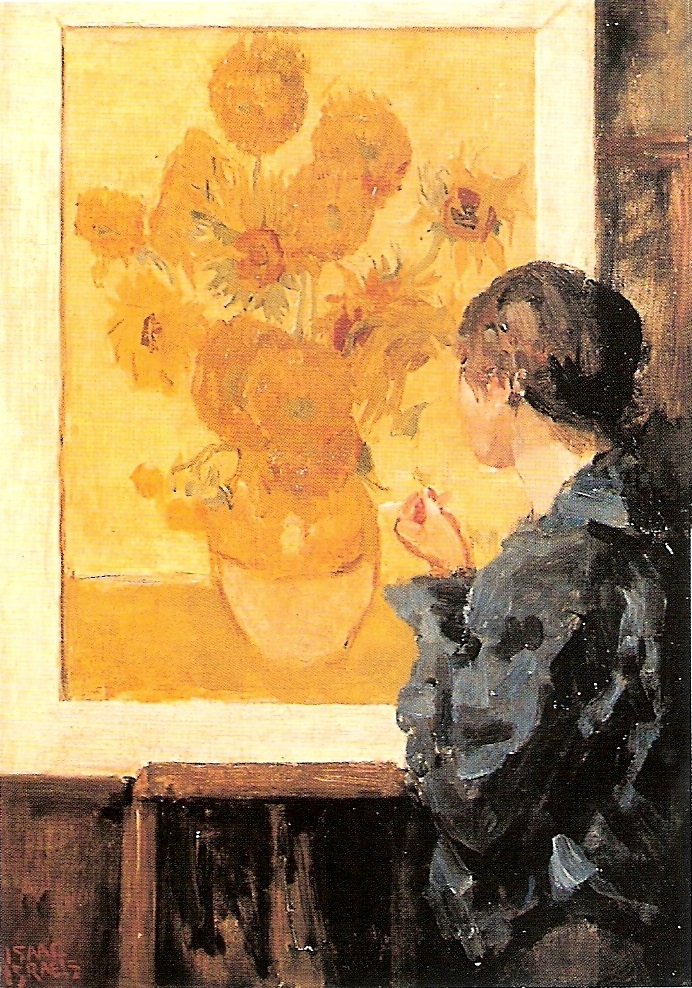
Homage to Van Gogh (Blue Blouse)

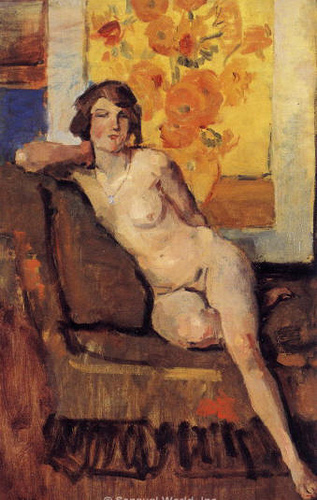
Nude, Model in Front of Van Gogh's Sunflowers

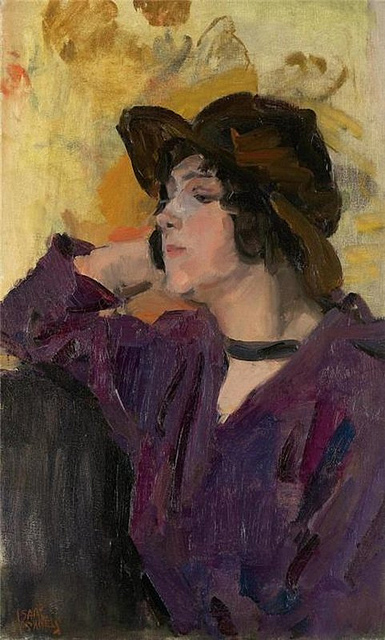
Woman in Front of Van Gogh's Sunflowers

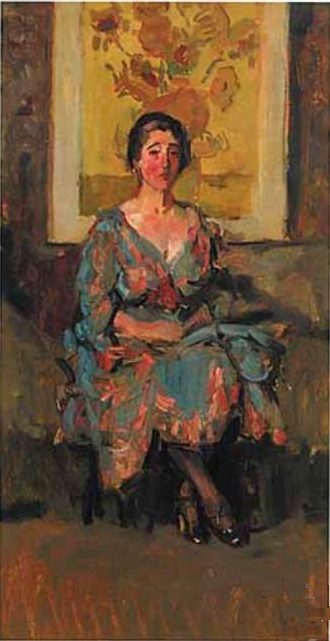
Seated Woman in Front of Van Gogh's Sunflowers
