= A Jewish Wedding =

Painting by Jozef Israëls

- Joodse bruiloft (Dutch)
- Artist: Jozef Israëls
- Year: 1903
- Medium: Oil-on-canvas
- Movement: Realism (arts)
- Dimensions: 137 cm (54 in) × 148 cm (58 in)
- Location: Rijksmuseum, Amsterdam
- Website: Jewish Wedding

A Jewish Wedding is a 1903 oil-on-canvas painting by the Dutch artist Jozef Israëls. The painting is a depiction of an upper-class traditional Jewish wedding. The painting is thought to be a depiction of the artist's daughter's wedding.

== History ==
Israëls created the painting titled A Jewish Wedding in 1903. The participants in the wedding scene are from the upper class or well-to-do. In the 1850s Israëls was documenting the lives of poor people, notably fishermen and their families. It was not until late in his career that he began to paint Jewish subjects. The painting was thought to be a depiction of his daughter Mathilda Anna Israëls' wedding to Cohen Tervaert, although the artist himself disputed this.

The painting was exhibited, alongside Israëls' Field and Roads, at the London Guildhall. In 1911 the painting was presented to the State Museum of Amsterdam as a gift from J.C.J. Drucker from London. He donated 19 paintings and all were the works of the artist Jozef Israëls.

== Description ==
The painting shows a groom who is dressed in formal attire wearing a top hat and a coat with talis. The groom wears a hat according to Jewish tradition. He is looking down affectionately while putting a ring on the finger of the bride. The bride is watching the act.

In the painting the bride and groom are both covered by a tallit (Jewish prayer shawl) and it is symbolic of a chuppah or wedding canopy. The participants who look on in the wedding painting appear to be upper class as well.

== Reception ==
In the book Jozef Israëls, author John Ernest Phythian states that the painting was hastily completed and he called it an "unusual summary". He went on to say, "The picture has unusually little value as a work of art." An image of the painting appears on the cover of the 2020 book, The Many Ways Jews Loved by Constance Harris.
