= Two Girls in the Snow =

Painting by Isaac Israëls

Two girls in the snow
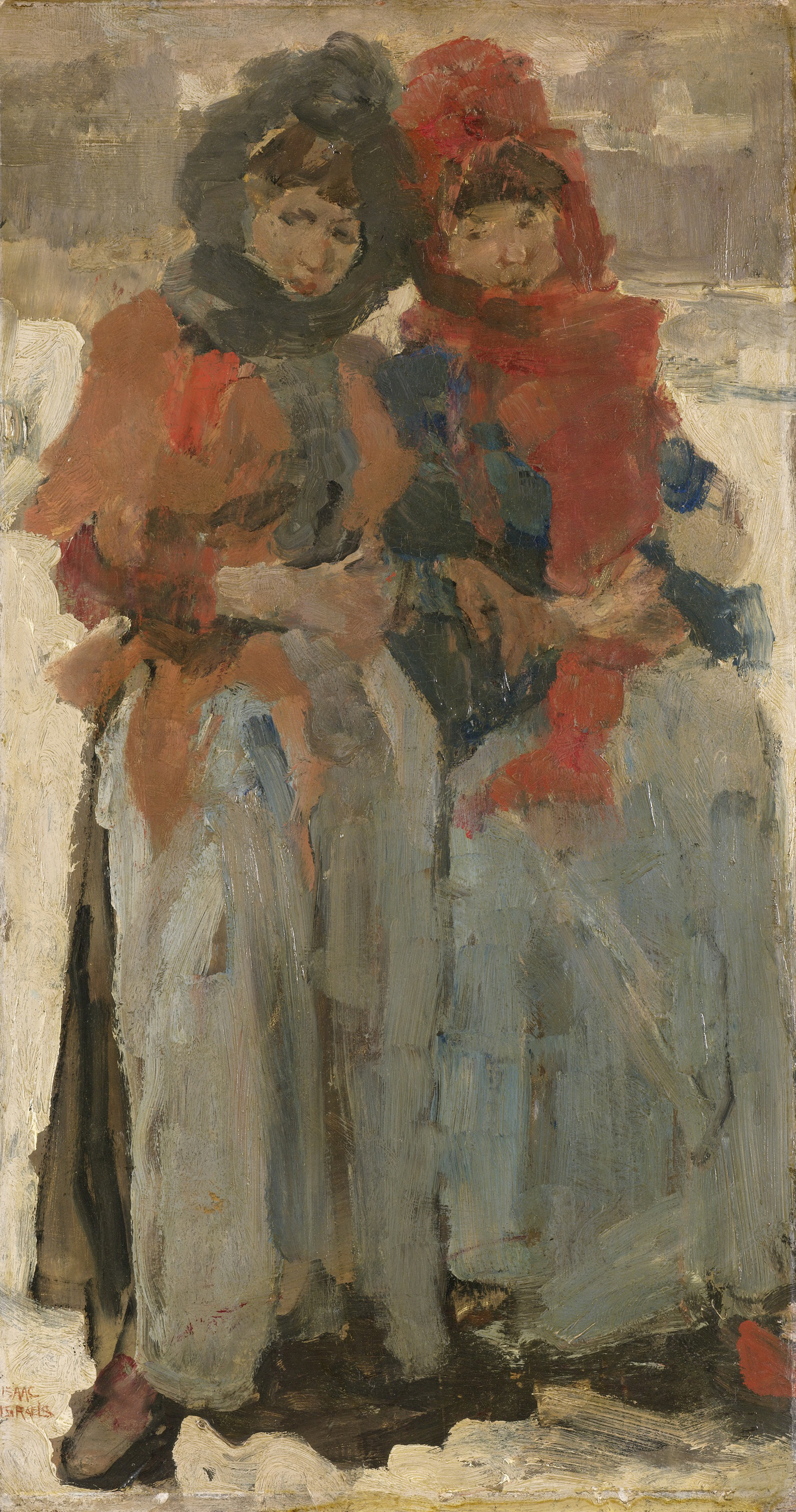
- Artist: Isaac Israëls
- Year: 1894
- Medium: oil paint, panel
- Dimensions: 65 cm (26 in) × 36 cm (14 in)
- Location: Rijksmuseum

Two Girls in the Snow is an oil on panel painting by the Dutch artist Isaac Israëls, from c. 1890–1894. It depicts two girls, facing heavy cold, in a city street. It is held in the Rijksmuseum, in Amsterdam.

== Description ==
This is one of Israel's few preserved paintings from the early 1890s, with which he was apparently satisfied. It depicts two factory or studio girls, at full-length, caught by the painter as they are passing on the street. However, this is an illusion, since they are carefully posing for the artist. The two young women, wrapped in woollen shawls, with colourful jackets and white aprons, are apparently only for a short time in the cold. They stand there somewhat laughing, almost suspiciously. In the background, the urban development of the city is depicted in large areas of colour.

Two Girls in the Snow is painted in a loose, broad impressionistic style. Characteristic are the refined colour touches and the intimacy of the composition. Given the directness of the scene, it seems that the work was painted at open air. This seems remarkable because Israëls was only first seen regularly working in the city with his easel at the end of the 1890s. This painting could be a first attempt. However, it is possible that the painting was worked out in his studio based on a previous sketch.

There are few paintings that have been preserved by Israëls from his early period of 1890–1894. In these works some 'street girls' appear, often as a pair, apparently portrayed unexpectedly by the artist.

== Provenance ==
It was bought from the artist in 1904 for the private Drake-Fraser collection in London, which lent it to the Rijksmuseum, in Amsterdam, in 1917. It was bought by the museum in 1944.
