= Fishermen Carrying a Drowned Man =

Painting by Jozef Israëls

- The Shipwrecked Mariner
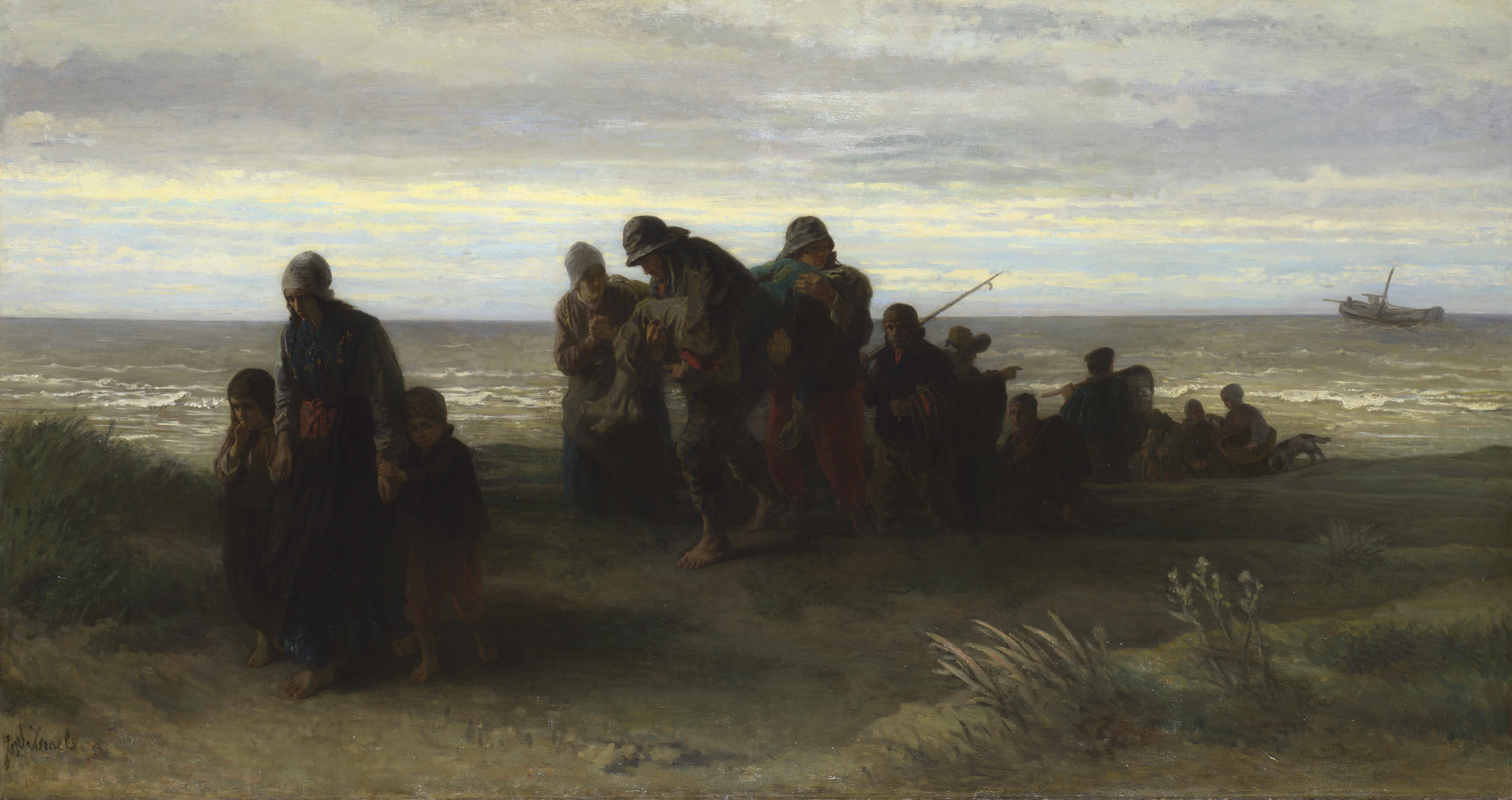
- Artist: Jozef Israëls
- Year: 1861
- Catalogue: Room 41
- Medium: Oil-on-canvas
- Movement: Realism
- Dimensions: 129 cm (51 in) x 244 cm (96 in)
- Location: National Gallery, London
- Website: National Gallery

Fishermen Carrying a Drowned Man also known as The Shipwrecked Mariner is an 1861 oil-on-canvas painting by Dutch artist Jozef Israëls. The scene includes a group of people carrying a dead fisherman away from the water.

== History ==
Israëls spent time in Zandvoort and he documented the lives of fishermen and their families. The painting is one in a series of four paintings with the theme: death of a fisherman. This painting is the largest of the four. The painting was displayed at the 1861 Salon (Paris), in Antwerp and London during the 1860s. It was in a private collection in England after an 1862 exhibition. In 1910 it was donated to the National Gallery in London by Mrs Alexander Young fulfilling the wishes of her husband. The painting is also known as The Shipwrecked Mariner.

== Description ==
The images of the people are dark and the subject of the painting is a huddled group carrying a dead fisherman away from the water's edge. The sky in the image is lighted and muted blue and silver. It is considered to be Funerary art and it is also a representation of self-sacrifice. The painting is an example of the style of realism.

== Reception ==
The image was exhibited at the Salon (Paris) 1861 and at the 1862 International Exhibition in London. An English spectator purchased the painting after the 1862 exhibition.
