= Portrait of a Wounded KNIL Soldier =

Painting by Isaac Israëls

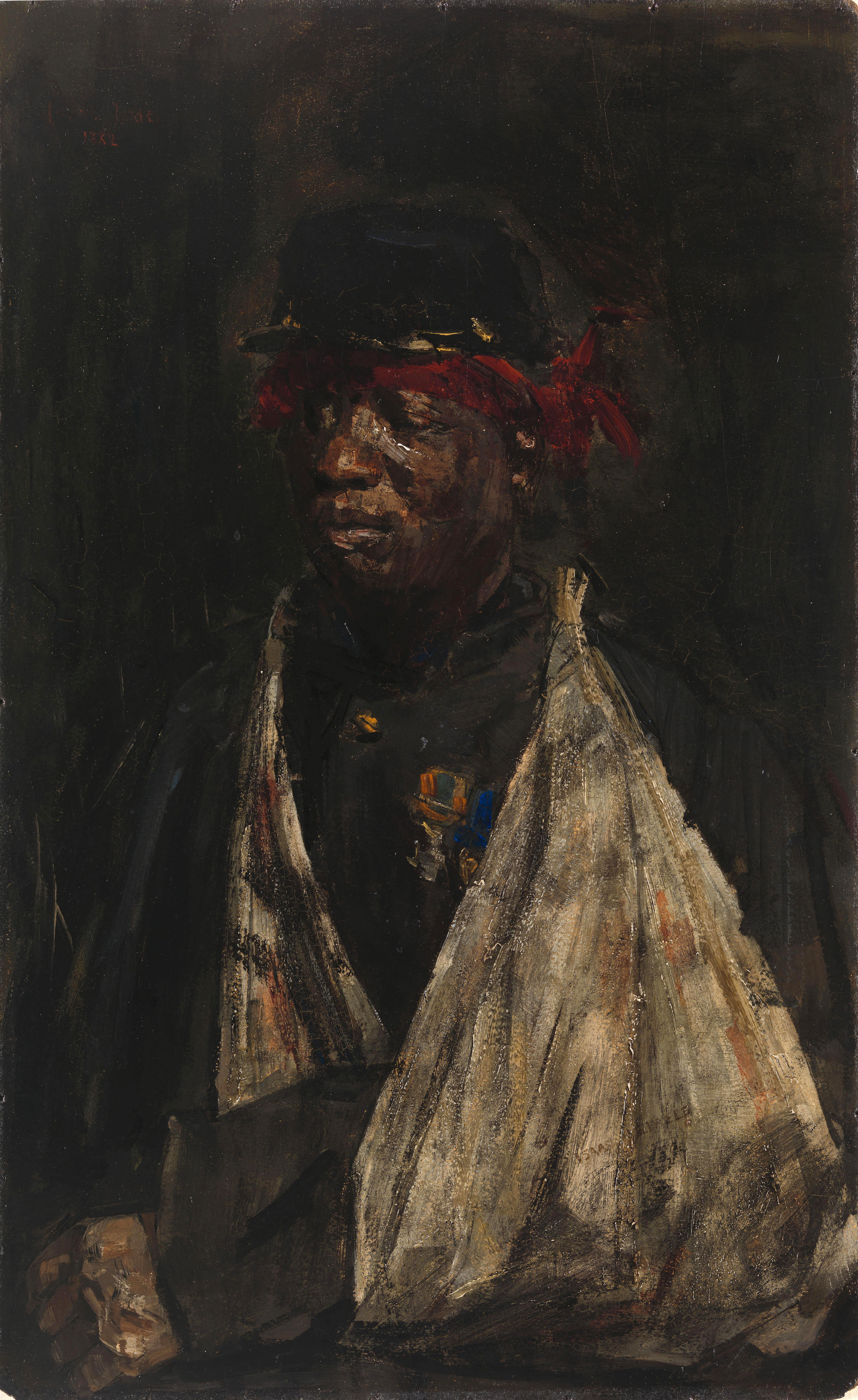
- Year: 1882
- Medium: oil paint
- Dimensions: 37 cm (15 in) × 23 cm (9.1 in)
- Location: Rijksmuseum, Netherlands
- Accession No.: SK-A-4954

Portrait of a Wounded KNIL Soldier (Dutch: Portret van een gewonde KNIL-militair. Also known as Portret van KNIL-militair Kees Pop; "Portrait of KNIL Soldier Kees Pop") is an Amsterdam impressionist portrait painting by Isaac Israëls, signed and dated to 1882. It has been in the Rijksmuseum since 2000.

The sitter was identified in 2000 by Eveline Sint Nicolaas as Kees Pop, an African soldier of the Dutch East Indies Army (Koninklijk Nederlands Indisch Leger; "KNIL"). Such men were recruited during the period 1831–1872 as Zwarte Hollanders in Elmina and given names that were pronounceable for their military superiors. ‘Pop’ was possibly from Elmina, but could have been born as far north as Burkina Faso or as far East as Nigeria. He served 12 years in the Aceh War. Under his mitella the medals for the Expedition Cross and the Aceh Medal can be seen. His comrade Jan Kooi was portrayed in the same year by J.C. Leich in a much more heroic, realistic military fashion, whereas Israels was much more interested in the drama of the sitter's personal story. This portrait shows the effects of a long military career in a foreign country surrounded by African comrades who themselves spoke different languages, answering to a name from a foreign language. Israëls had a fascination for the Dutch East Indies, possibly fostered by his friendship with the Dutch painter Johannes Evert Hendrik Akkeringa, who was of mixed Indonesian heritage. Though the first World War caused him to delay, Israëls did manage to visit the Dutch East Indies himself, where he made many paintings during the course of a two-year stay in 1921, armed with introductory letters from Akkeringa.

== Legacy ==
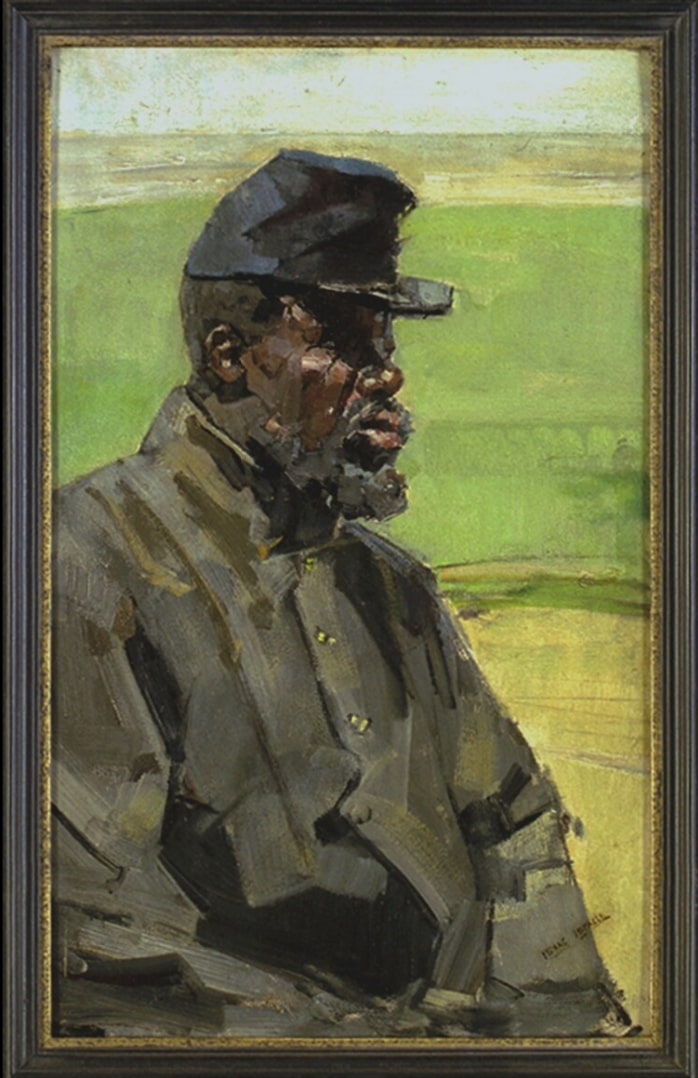
Portrait of an African soldier of the Royal Netherlands East Indies Army, probably Jan Kooi: Also by Israëls, 1882

This portrait, along with the portrait of Jan Kooi, was featured in the 2008 art exhibition in the Amsterdam Nieuwe Kerk called "Black is Beautiful", and sparked a national conversation about the Indo-African community that nearly a century later arrived in the Netherlands from Indonesia after WWII, some of whose members were possible descendants of these men. The artist Pieter Hugo made a portrait photograph that nods both to this impressionist painting and to the realistic painting of Jan Kooi.
