= Jens Sigsgaard =

Danish psychologist and writer (1910–1991)

Jens Sigsgaard (1910–1991), was a noted Danish author of children's stories and Psychologist. He was a founder director of the Froebel Institute serving in this role from 1941 to 1974 (now part of the University College Capital, Copenhagen). Perhaps his most noted story book was Palle alene i Verden (Paul Alone in the World).
