= Alone in the World (1881 painting) =

Painting by Jozef Israëls

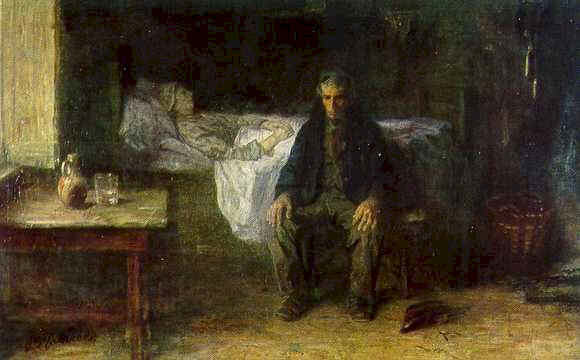
- Artist: Jozef Israëls
- Year: c. 1880-1881
- Medium: Oil on canvas
- Dimensions: 125 cm × 200 cm (49 in × 79 in)
- Location: Mesdag Collection, The Hague

Alone in the World is an oil-on-canvas painting by Dutch artist Jozef Israëls, from c. 1880-1881. Its subject is isolation and death. The painting was exhibited at the 1893 World's Columbian Exposition in Chicago Illinois. It is held at the Mesdag Collection, in The Hague.

== Description ==
The painting has been called strong, beautiful and realistic. The scene is a portrayal of death and poverty. The broken-hearted man, and the face of the dead woman in the dull light of the room portray isolation and death. The image shows a man, wearing an overcoat, sitting on a chair by a bed. A woman is lying in the bed and the man is facing away from her. The man has a stern expression and woman appears to be ill.

== Reception ==
French critic Louis Edmond Duranty said of the painting, "dombre et de douleur" or shadow and pain. H.C. Payne said of the scene in the painting, "...a scene, so entirely subordinate to its human meaning, and this is so profound and so clearly felt, that we do not think of the painting at all".
