= Alone in the World (Bouguereau) =

Painting by William-Adolphe Bouguereau

- Seule au Monde (French)
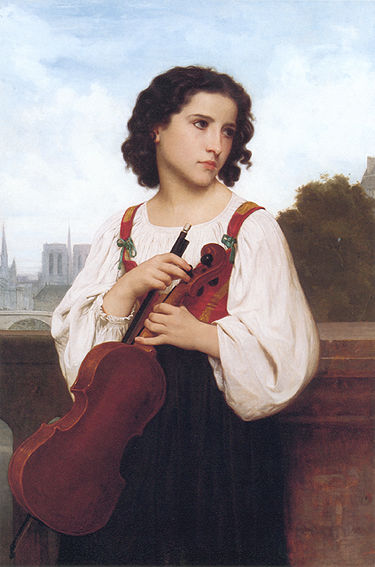
- Alone in the World (c.1867)
- Artist: William-Adolphe Bouguereau
- Year: c. 1867
- Medium: Oil on canvas

Alone in the World (French: Seule au Monde) is an oil-on-canvas painting created by nineteenth-century French artist William-Adolphe Bouguereau. Although the exact year of creation is unknown, Theo van Gogh acquired it in 1867 so it may be placed in the early part of Bouguereau's career.

The painting depicts a peasant girl holding a violin and standing on a bridge over the Seine in Paris. She is looking to her left with a melancholy expression. The cathedral of Notre Dame can be seen in the background, as well as a bridge which appears to be the Pont Royal. This indicates that the girl is standing on the Pont de Solférino.

== See also ==
- William-Adolphe Bouguereau gallery
