= Jozef Israëls =

Dutch painter (1824–1911)

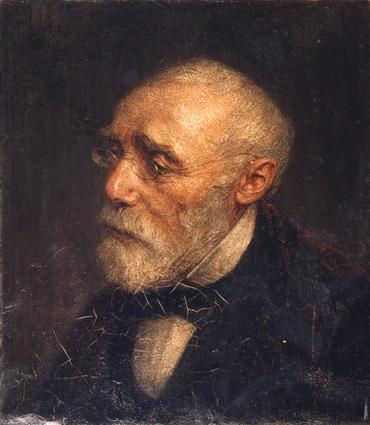
- Jozef Israëls by Jan Veth
- Born: 27 January 1824; Groningen, Netherlands
- Died: 12 August 1911 (aged 87); Scheveningen, Netherlands
- Children: 2, including Isaac Israëls
- Patrons: Jan Adam Kruseman; François-Édouard Picot

Jozef Israëls (Dutch pronunciation: [ˈjoːzəf ˈɪsraːɛls]; 27 January 1824 – 12 August 1911) was a Dutch painter. He was a leading member of the group of landscape painters referred to as the Hague School and was, during his lifetime, "the most respected Dutch artist of the second half of the nineteenth century."

== Early life ==
He was born in Groningen to Jewish parents. His father, Hartog Abraham Israëls, was a money changer and intended for Jozef to be a businessman. His mother, Mathilda Salomon née Polack, hoped he would become a rabbi. When he was eleven years old, he attended Minerva Academy in Groningen and began to study painting.

He subsequently continued his studies in Amsterdam, studying at the Royal Academy for Fine Arts, which later became the State Academy for Fine Arts. He was a pupil of Jan Kruseman and attended the drawing class at the academy. From September 1845 until May 1847 he was in Paris, working in the history painter François-Édouard Picot's studio and taking classes at the Ecole des Beaux-Arts under James Pradier, Horace Vernet, and Paul Delaroche. He returned to Amsterdam in September 1845, where he resumed his studies at the Academy until May 1847. Israëls remained in Amsterdam until 1870, when he moved to The Hague and became a leading member of the Hague School of landscape painters.

== Sensibility ==
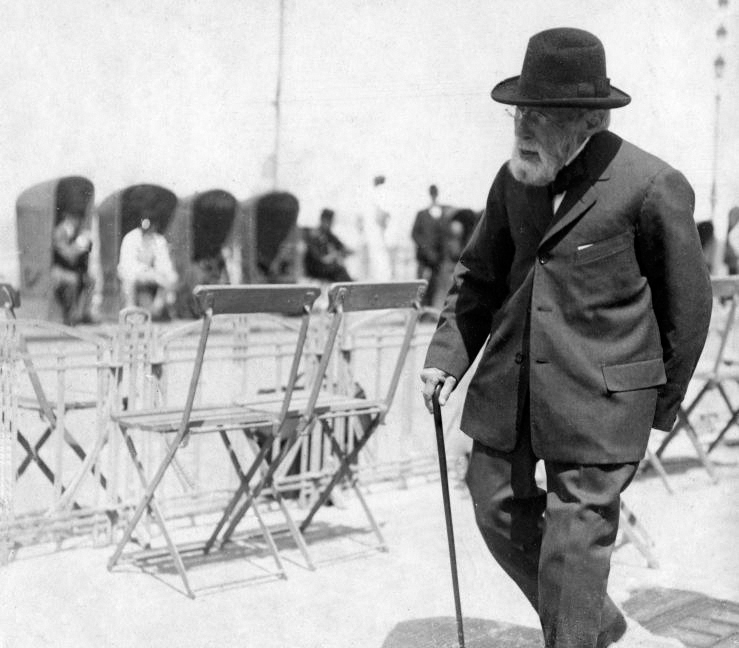
Israëls on the beach at Scheveningen (1911)

Israëls has often been compared to Jean-François Millet. As artists, even more than as painters in the strict sense of the word, they both saw in the life of the poor and humble a motive for expressing with peculiar intensity their wide human sympathy; but Millet was the poet of placid rural life, while in almost all Israëls' pictures there is some piercing note of woe. Edmond Duranty said that they were painted with gloom and suffering.

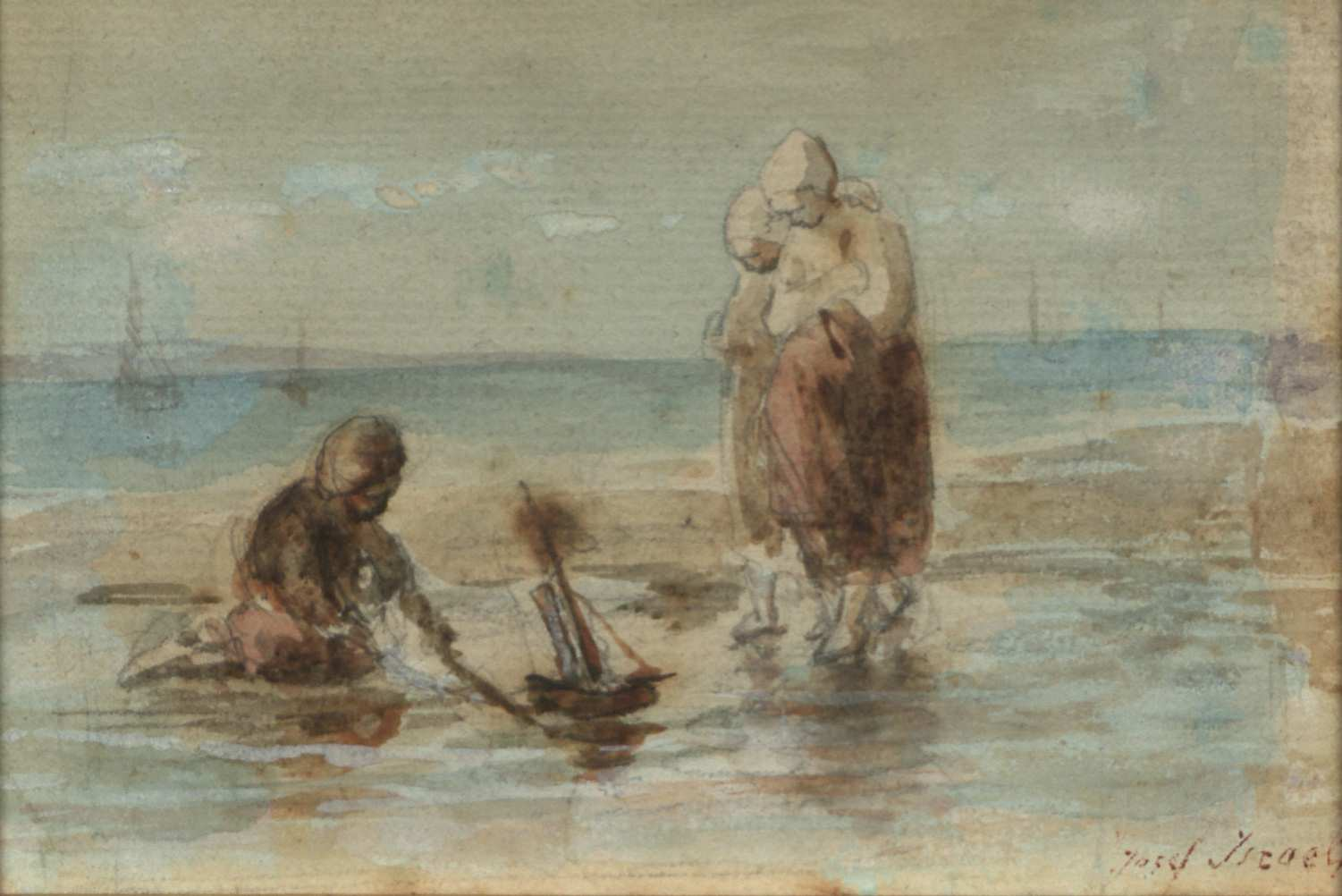
Young Navigators, Aberdeen Archives, Gallery & Museums Collection

He began with historical and dramatic subjects in the romantic style of the day. After an illness, he went to recuperate his strength at the fishing town of Zandvoort near Haarlem, and there he was struck by the daily tragedy of life. Henceforth, he was possessed by a new vein of artistic expression, sincerely realistic, full of emotion and pity.

Among his more important subsequent works are The Zandvoort Fisherman (in the Amsterdam Gallery), The Silent House (which gained a gold medal at the Brussels Salon, 1858), and Village Poor (a prize at Manchester).

In 1862, he achieved great success in London with his The Shipwrecked Mariner, purchased by a Mr Young, and The Cradle, two pictures that the Athenaeum magazine described as the most touching pictures of the exhibition.

A portrait of Jozef Israëls was painted by the Scottish painter George Paul Chalmers .

In 1886, he was made an Officer in the Order of Leopold.

== Later work ==
His later works include The Widower (in the Mesdag collection), When we grow Old, Peasant Family at the Table and Alone in the World (Van Gogh Museum / Amsterdam Gallery), An Interior (Dordrecht Gallery), A Frugal Meal (Glasgow Museum), Toilers of the Sea, Speechless Dialogue, Between the Fields and the Seashore, The Bric-a-brac Seller (which gained medals of honor at the Paris Exhibition of 1900).

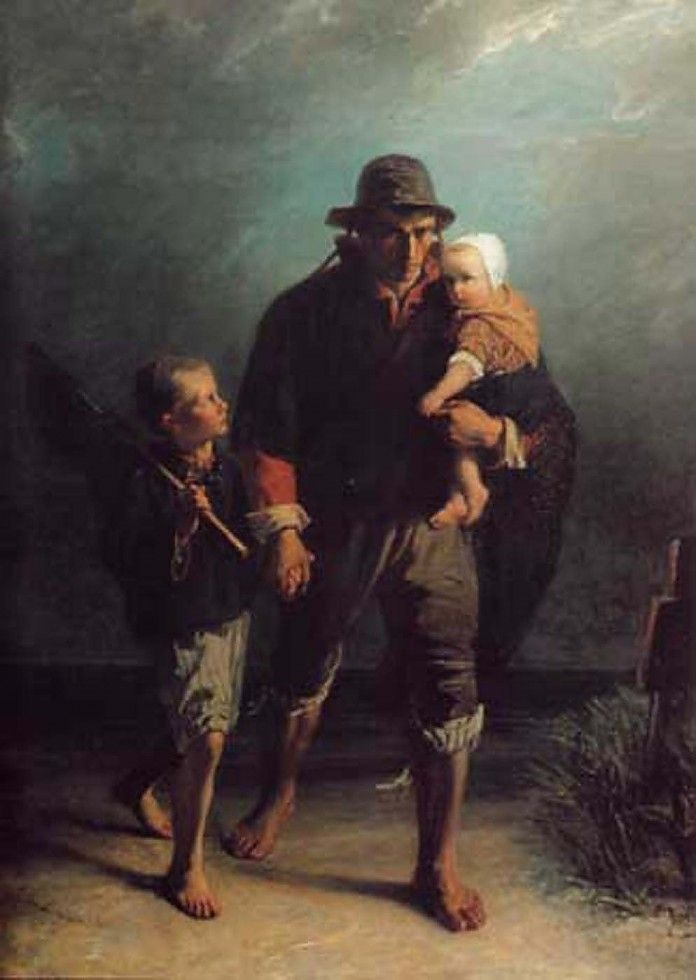
Passing Mother's Grave, 1856

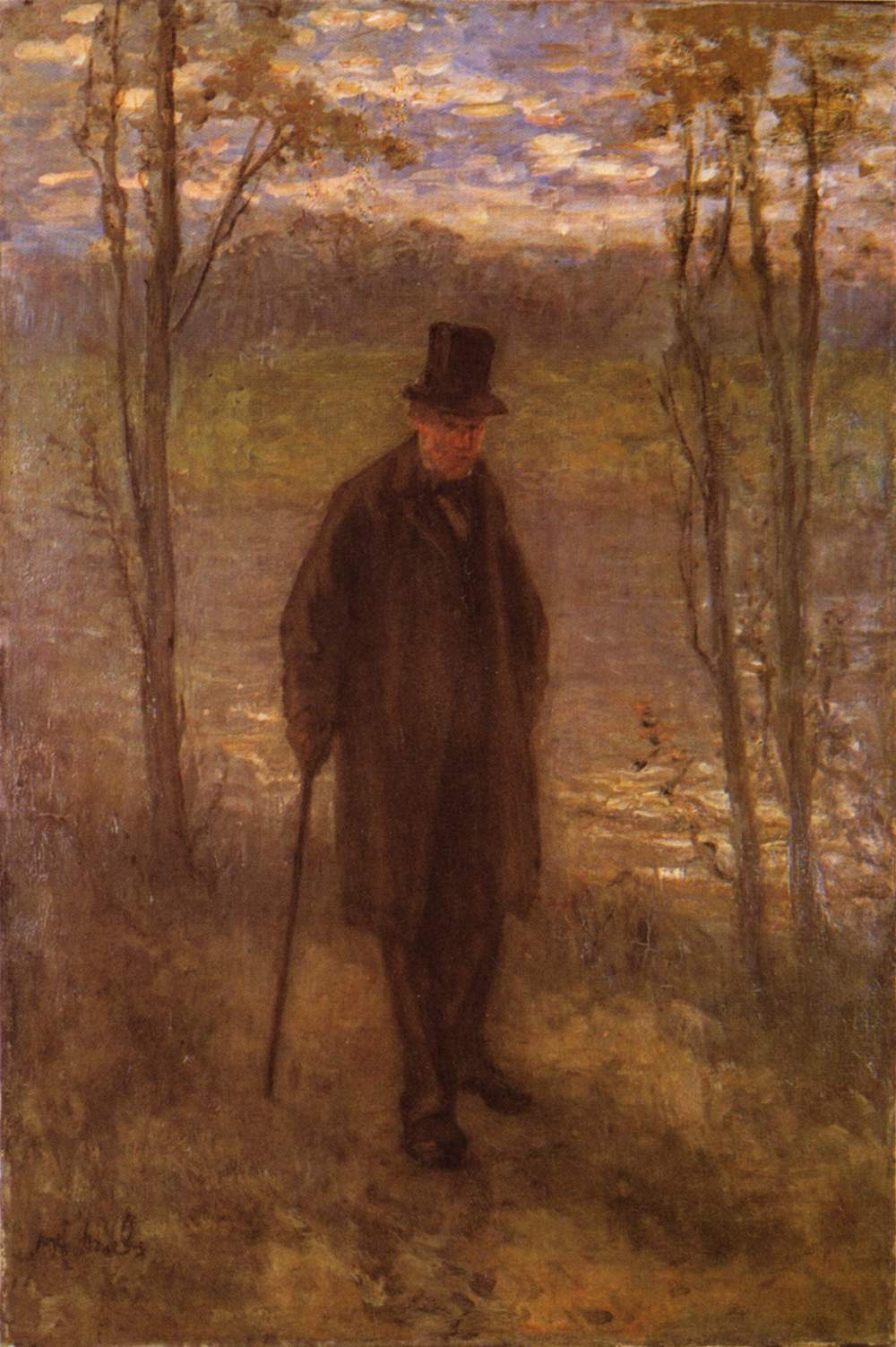
We Grow Old, 1878

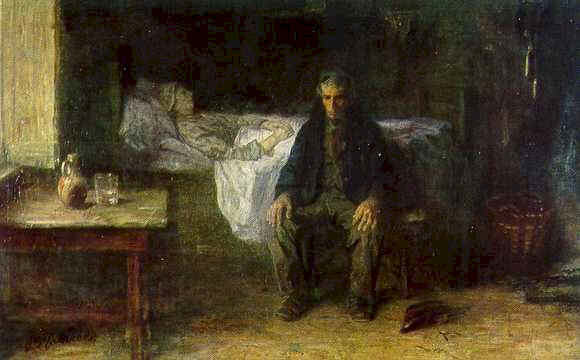
Alone in the World, 1881

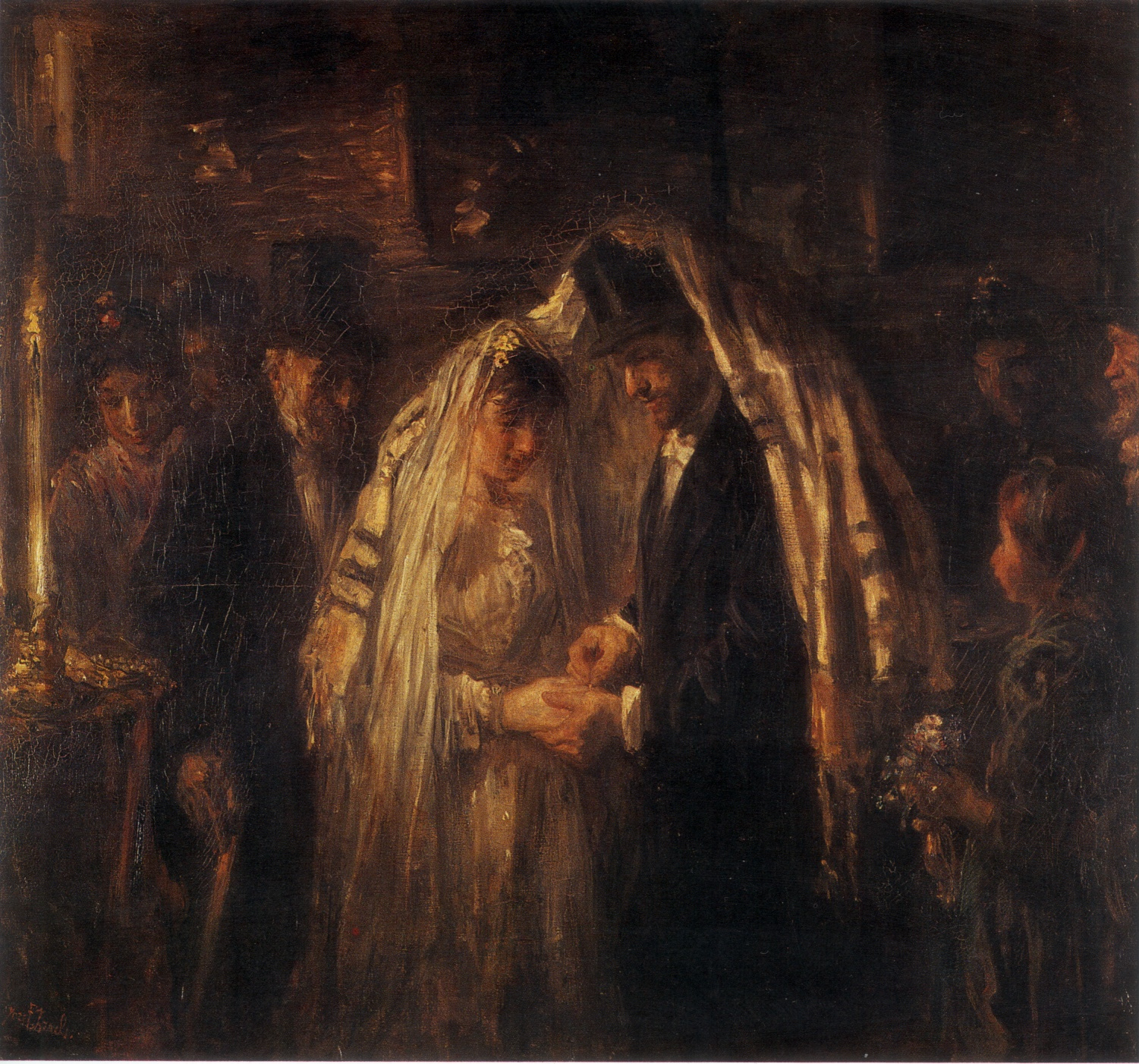
A Jewish Wedding, 1903

David Singing before Saul, one of his later works, seems to hint at a return on the part of the venerable artist to the Rembrandtesque note of his youth. As a watercolour painter and etcher he produced a vast number of works, which, like his oil paintings, are full of deep feeling. They are generally treated in broad masses of light and shade, which give prominence to the principal subject without any neglect of detail.

Israëls probably influenced many other painters; one of them was the Scottish painter Robert McGregor (1847–1922).

== Personal life ==
He married Aleida née Schaap and together the couple had two children: a daughter, Mathilde Anna Israëls, and a son, Isaac Lazarus Israëls, born in 1865, who also became a fine art painter. On August 12, 1911 Jozef Israëls died in Scheveningen, The Hague.

== Bibliography ==
- Jan Veth, Mannen of Betekenis: Jozef Israëls
- Chesneau, Peintres français et étrangers
- Philippe Zilcken, Peintres hollandais modernes (1893)
- Dumas, Illustrated Biographies of Modern Artists (1882–1884)
- J. de Meester, in Max Roose's Dutch Painters of the Nineteenth Century (1898)
- Jozef Israëls, Spain: the Story of a Journey (1900).
