= Isaac Israëls =

Dutch painter (1865–1934)

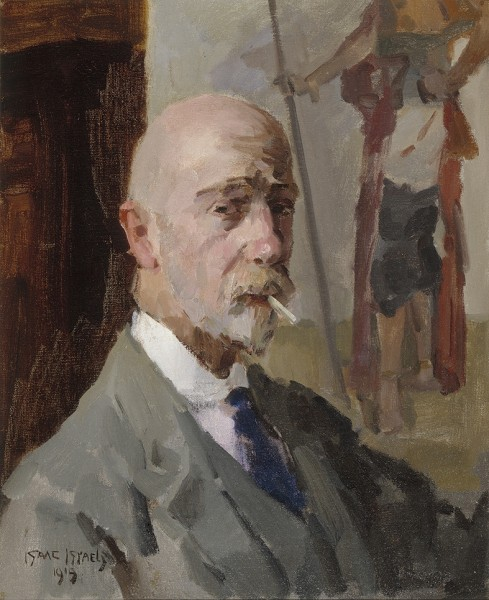
- Isaac Israëls – Self-portrait with a painting of the Javanese prince Jodjana, oil on canvas, 1919
- Born: Isaac Lazarus Israëls; 3 February 1865; Amsterdam, Netherlands
- Died: 7 October 1934 (aged 69); The Hague, Netherlands
- Education: Royal Academy of Art; Rijksakademie
- Movement: Amsterdam Impressionism
- Patrons: Jozef Israëls (father)

Olympic medal record

Art competitions
Gold medal – first place	1928 Amsterdam	Paintings

Isaac Lazarus Israëls (Dutch pronunciation: [ˈizɑk ˈlaːzaːrʏs ˈɪsraːɛls]; 3 February 1865 – 7 October 1934) was a Dutch painter associated with the Amsterdam Impressionism movement.

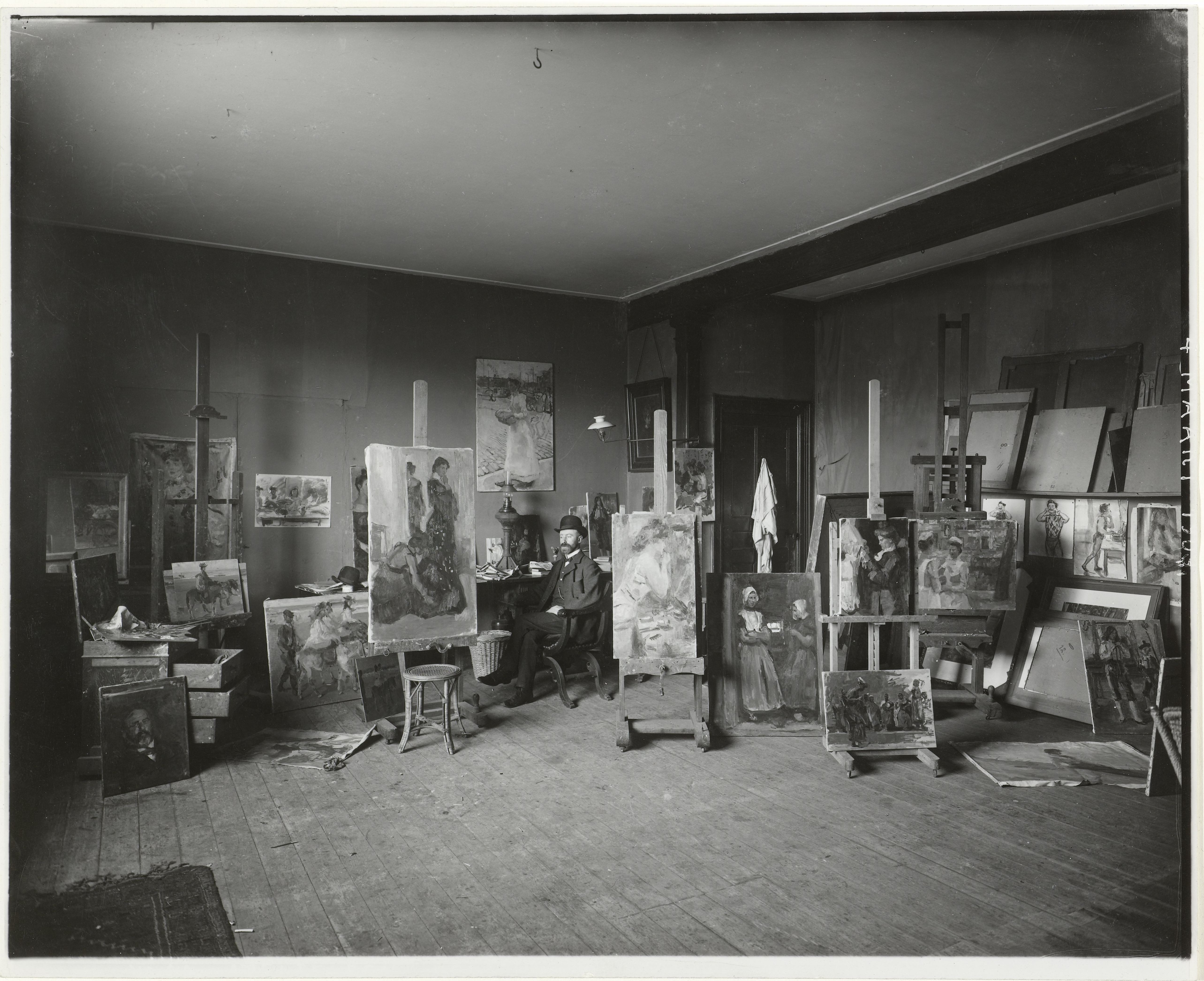
Israëls in his Amsterdam studio located in Oosterpark

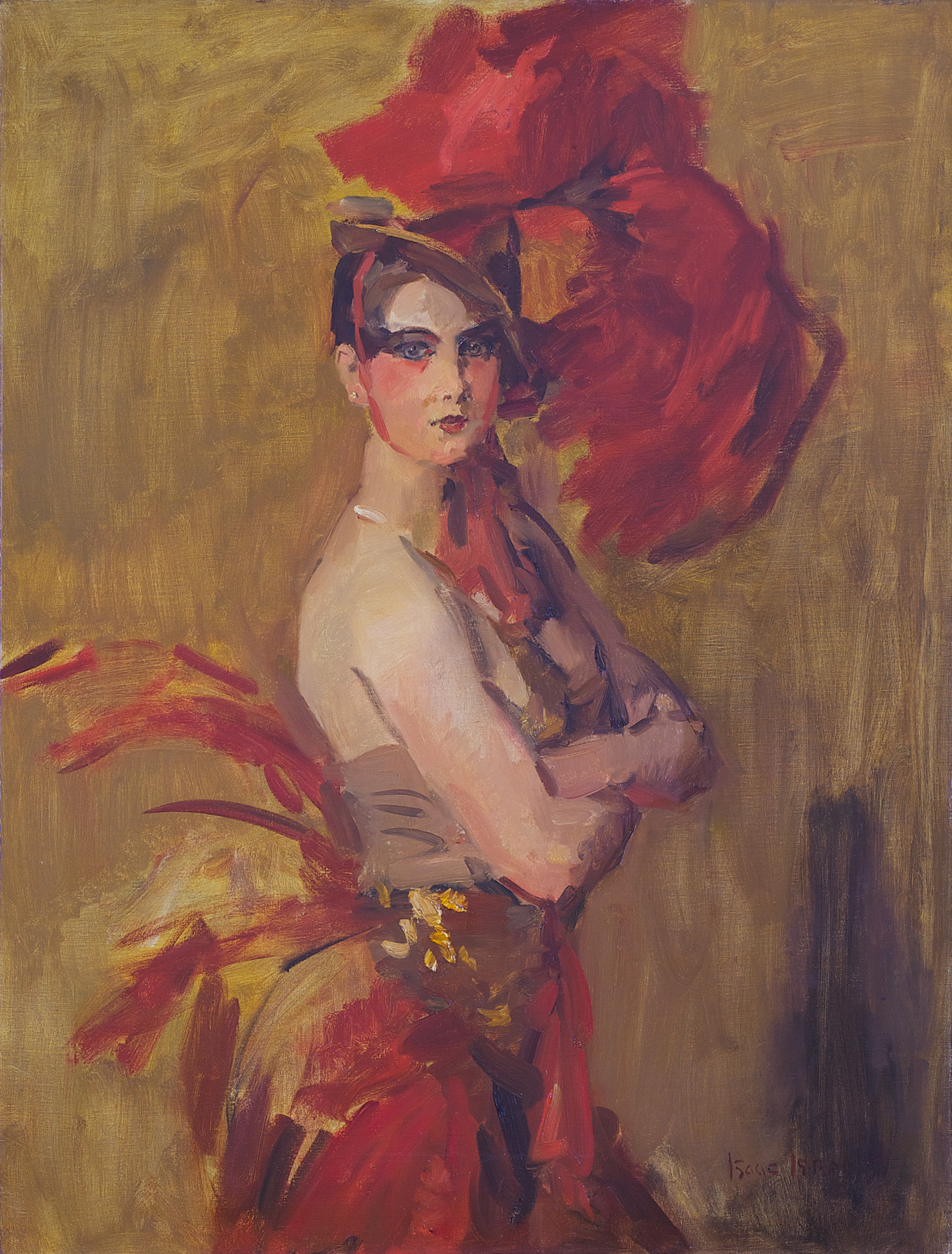
Show-girl (La Cocotte) in Bouwmeester Revue at Scala Theatre, Wagenstraat, The Hague; by Isaac Israëls, 1920s

- Women guests dancing together at Scala Theatre, Wagenstraat, The Hague; by Isaac Israëls, ca. 1925

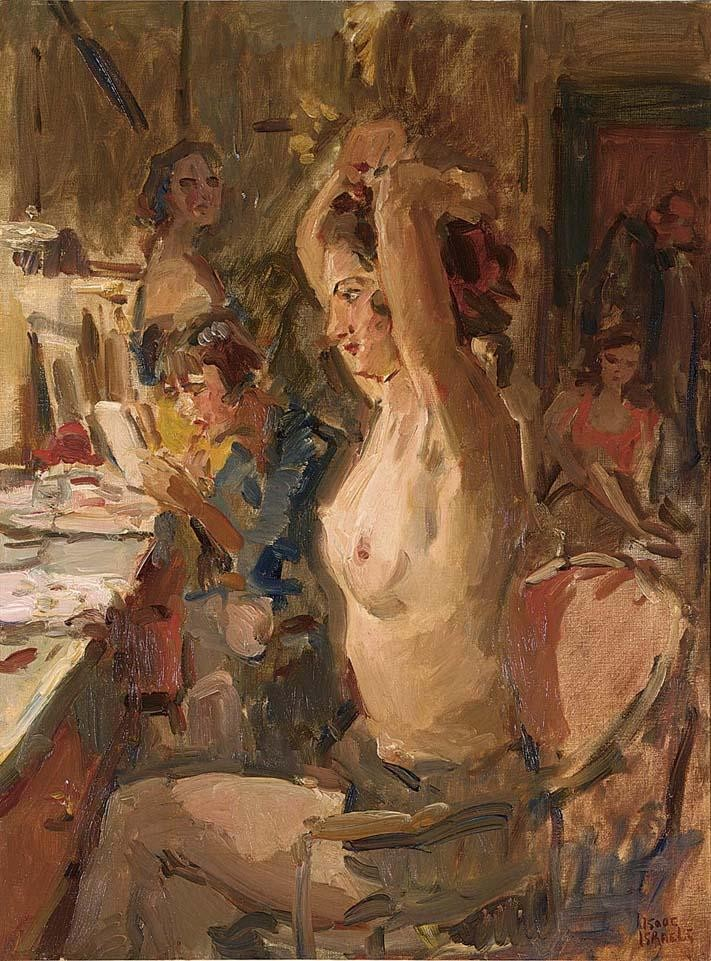
Dressing Room, Scala Theatre, Wagenstraat, The Hague; by Isaac Israëls

== Biography ==
The son of Jozef Israëls, one of the most respected painters of the Hague School, and Aleida Schaap, Isaac Israëls displayed precocious artistic talent from an early age. Israëls was Jewish.

Between 1880 and 1882 he studied at the Royal Academy of Art, The Hague, where he met George Hendrik Breitner who was to become a lifelong friend. In 1881, when he was 16, he sold a painting, Bugle Practice, even before it was finished to the artist and collector Hendrik Willem Mesdag. Two portraits he made in the same year of his grandmother and a family friend, Nannette Enthoven (below), attest to the technical ability he had attained by that age. Starting in 1878, Israëls made annual visits to the Salon des Artistes Français with his father and in 1882 made his debut there with Military Burial. In the 1885 Salon he received an honourable mention for his Transport of Colonial Soldiers. At this time he was reading Émile Zola, as was Breitner, and following his triumph at the Salon he spent a year travelling in the Belgian mining districts and elsewhere.

Beginning 1886, Israëls lived in Amsterdam and registered with Breitner at the Royal Academy of Visual Arts to complete his schooling. Both of them, however, quickly abandoned the academy for the more progressive circle of the Tachtigers, an influential group of writers and artists of the time. This was a group that insisted style must reflect content and that emotionally charged subjects can only be represented by an equally intense technique. Influenced by this philosophy, Israëls became a painter of the streets, cafes, and cabarets of Amsterdam. At this time he met the Dutch engraver and painter Willem de Zwart who also became a lifelong friend.

He often spent his summers with his father in the Dutch seaside resort of Scheveningen near The Hague. Guests included Édouard Manet and Max Liebermann. Interested by the changing light of sun and sea, he painted many colourful seaside scenes.

Towards the end of the century, Israëls was introduced by his childhood friend and portrait painter Thérèse Schwartze to the Amsterdam fashion house Hirsch & Cie at the Leidseplein. Israëls portrayed the whole range of the world of haute couture, from seamstress to wealthy client, gaining access even to the fitting-rooms.

Israëls moved to Paris in 1904, establishing his studio at 10 rue Alfred Stevens, 48.881784°N 2.338651°E, near Montmartre and just yards away from the studio of Henri de Toulouse-Lautrec whom he admired, as he also did Edgar Degas. As in Amsterdam, he painted the Parisian specific motifs: the public parks, cafes, cabarets and bistros, as well as such subjects as fairgrounds and circus acrobats. Likewise, he sought out the fashion houses Paquin and Drecoll to continue his studies of the world of fashion. However, he only exhibited once in this period, in 1909.

At the outbreak of the First World War he was living in London, where he found new subjects in horse-riding at Rotten Row and in ballerinas and boxers. He returned to Holland for the duration of the war, living alternately in The Hague, Amsterdam and Scheveningen, where he worked primarily as a portrait painter. Amongst his sitters was Margaretha Gertrud Zelle, better known as Mata Hari, executed as a spy in France in 1917. Her portrait can be seen at the Kröller-Müller Museum. Other sitters included Johanna van Gogh-Bonger and the feminist physician Aletta Jacobs, although he also portrayed ordinary subjects such as girls in the street and telephone operators.

Following the war, Israëls visited Paris, Copenhagen, Stockholm and London. He spent the years 1921 to 1922 travelling in India and the Dutch East Indies, sketching and painting the vibrant life of South East Asia and notably the gamelan players of Bali.

On his return, he settled at Koninginnegracht 2, The Hague, his deceased parents' home, where he remained for the rest of his life, nevertheless making regular trips abroad to London, Italy and the French Riviera.

At the age of 63, he won a gold medal at the 1928 Olympic Games for his painting "Cavalier rouge" (Ruiter in rode rok, Red Rider), an art competition then being part of the games. He participated in two other Olympic Games art competitions, 1924 at Paris and 1932 at Los Angeles.

He died at home, in The Hague on 7 October 1934, aged 69, two days after he was hit by a car, a street accident. His partner at that time was Sophie de Vries.

== Art market ==
On 26 April 2005, one of his Donkey riding on the Beach series realised €482,400 at Christie's, Amsterdam. The sale example was almost identical to the one in the Rijksmuseum, Amsterdam (below), but larger and a little more delicate in tone.

On 24 October 2006, A table at the Restaurant Le Perroquet, Paris realised €493,600 at Christie's, Amsterdam.

In July 2012 the City Archive of Amsterdam organized a solo exhibition to present Isaac Israëls's works in Amsterdam.

== Public collections ==
Among the public collections holding works by Isaac Israëls are:

- Museum de Fundatie, Zwolle
- Rijksmuseum Amsterdam
- Museo Soumaya Mexico City

== Gallery ==
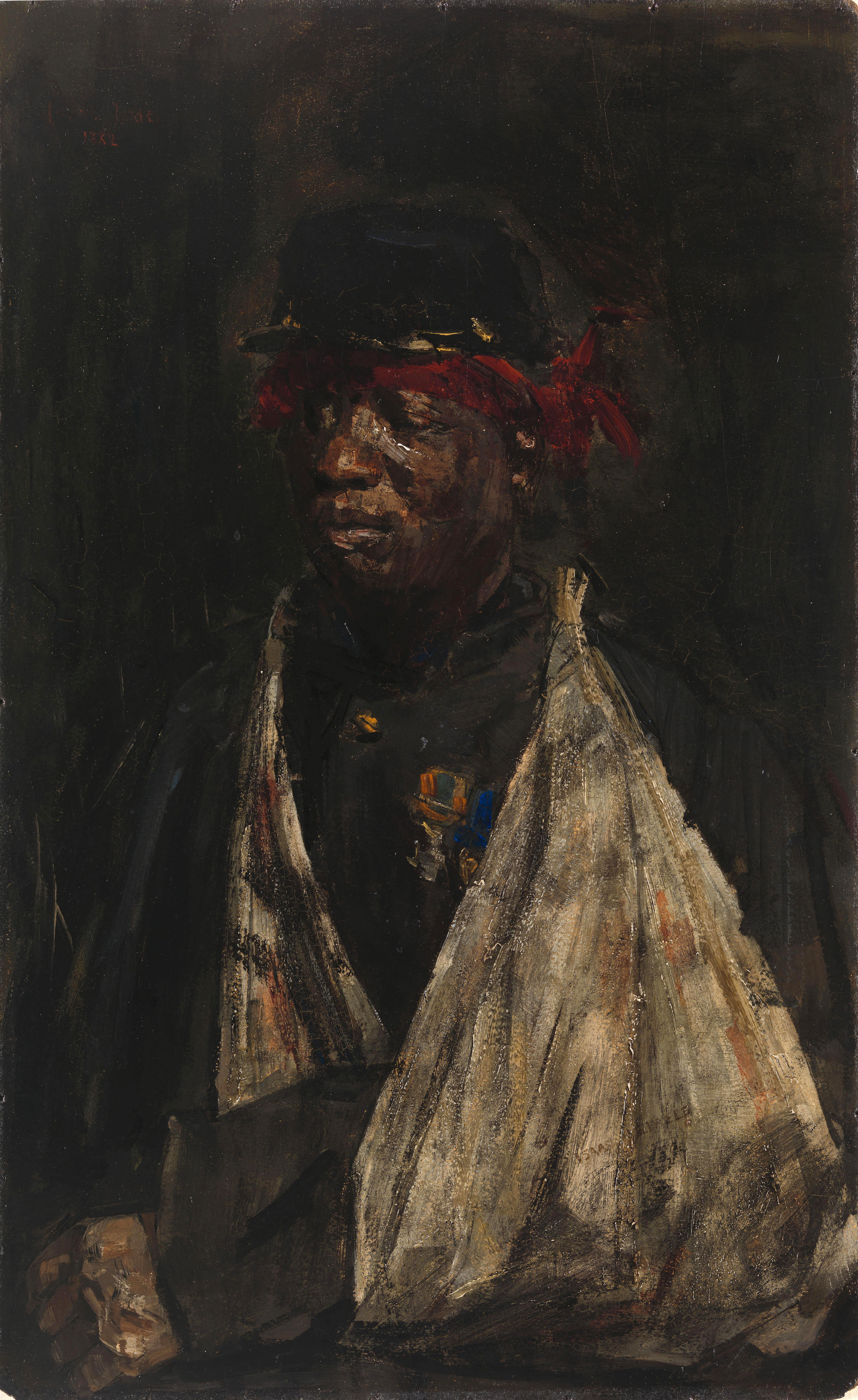
Portrait of a Wounded KNIL Soldier, 1882

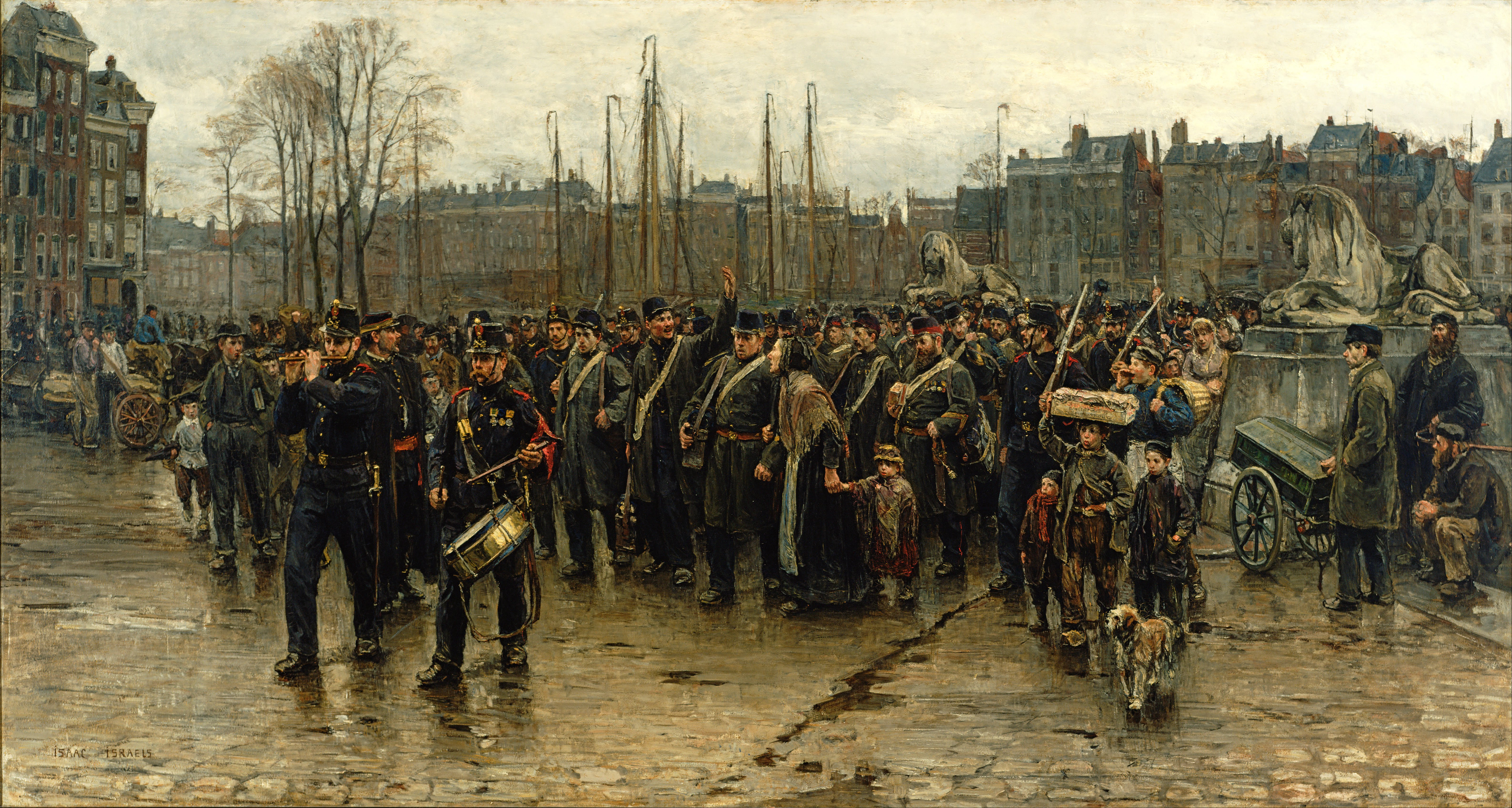
Het transport der kolonialen (1883–84), showing the Royal Netherlands East Indies Army walking through Rotterdam to their transport to the Dutch East Indies

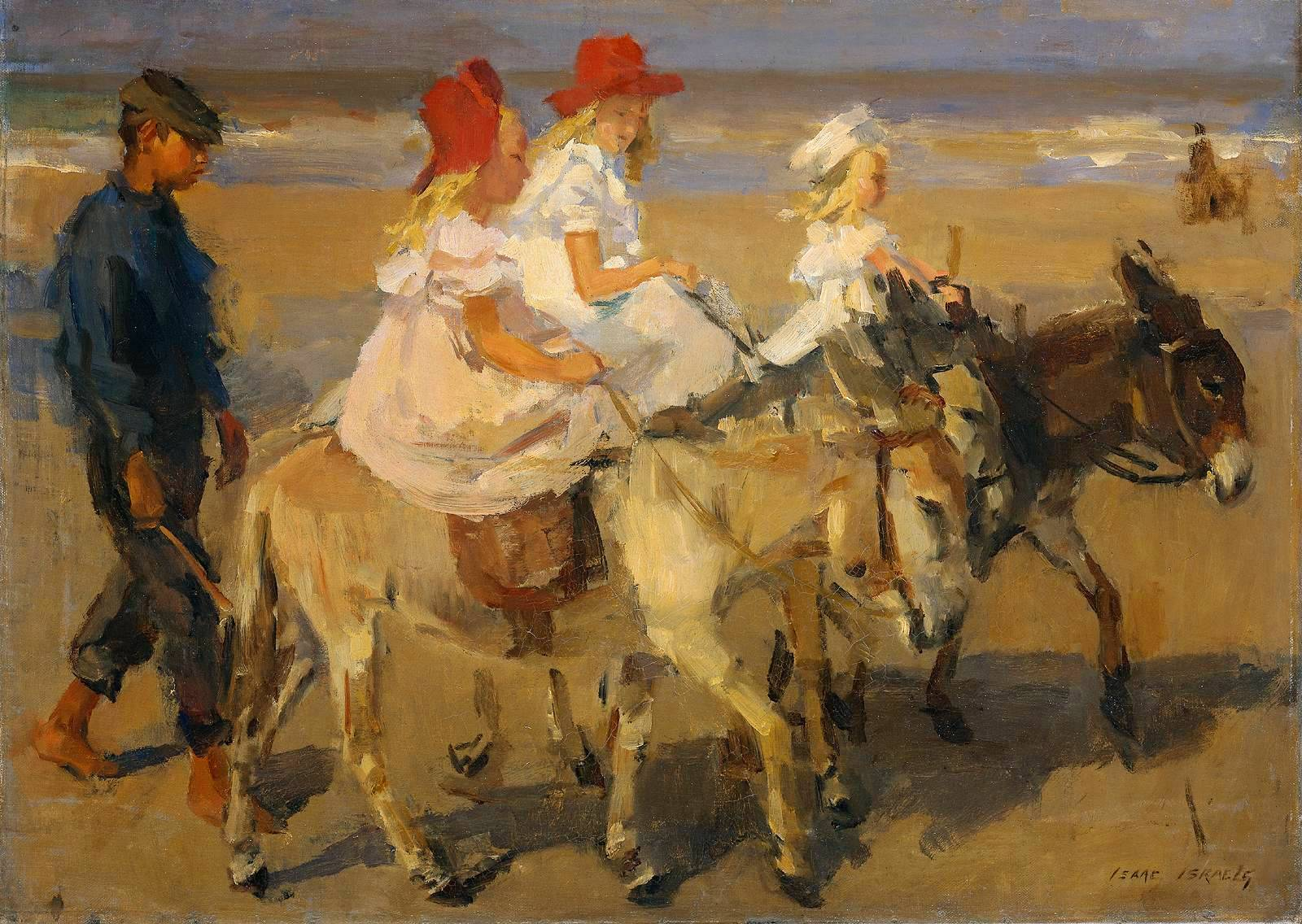
Riding Donkeys on the Beach, c. 1898–1900

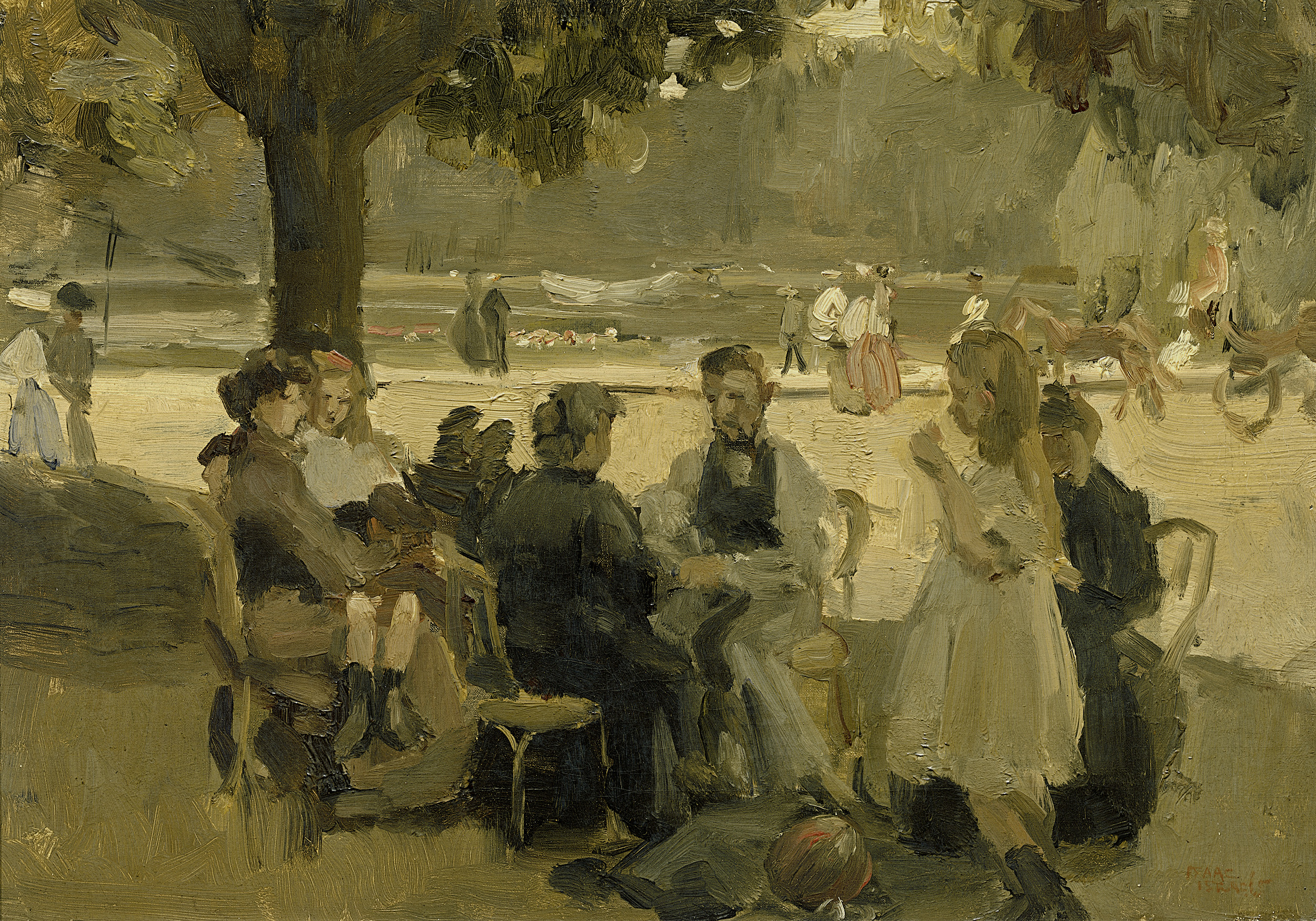
In the Bois de Boulogne close to Paris, oil on canvas, 1906

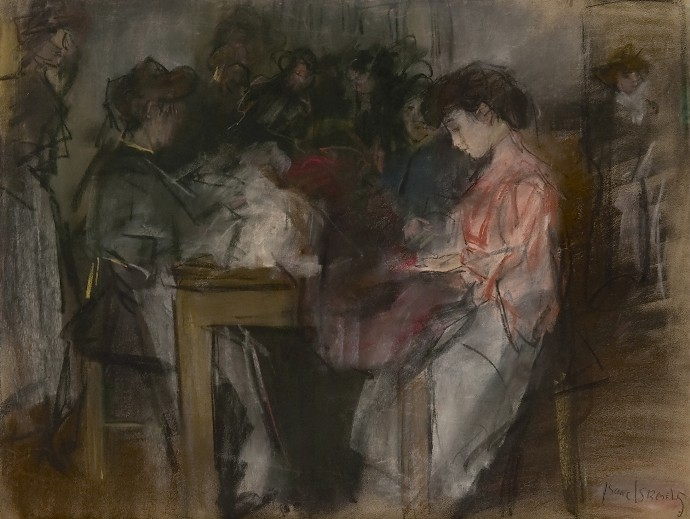
Seamstresses at Atelier Paquin, Paris, pencil and pastel on paper, ca. 1904

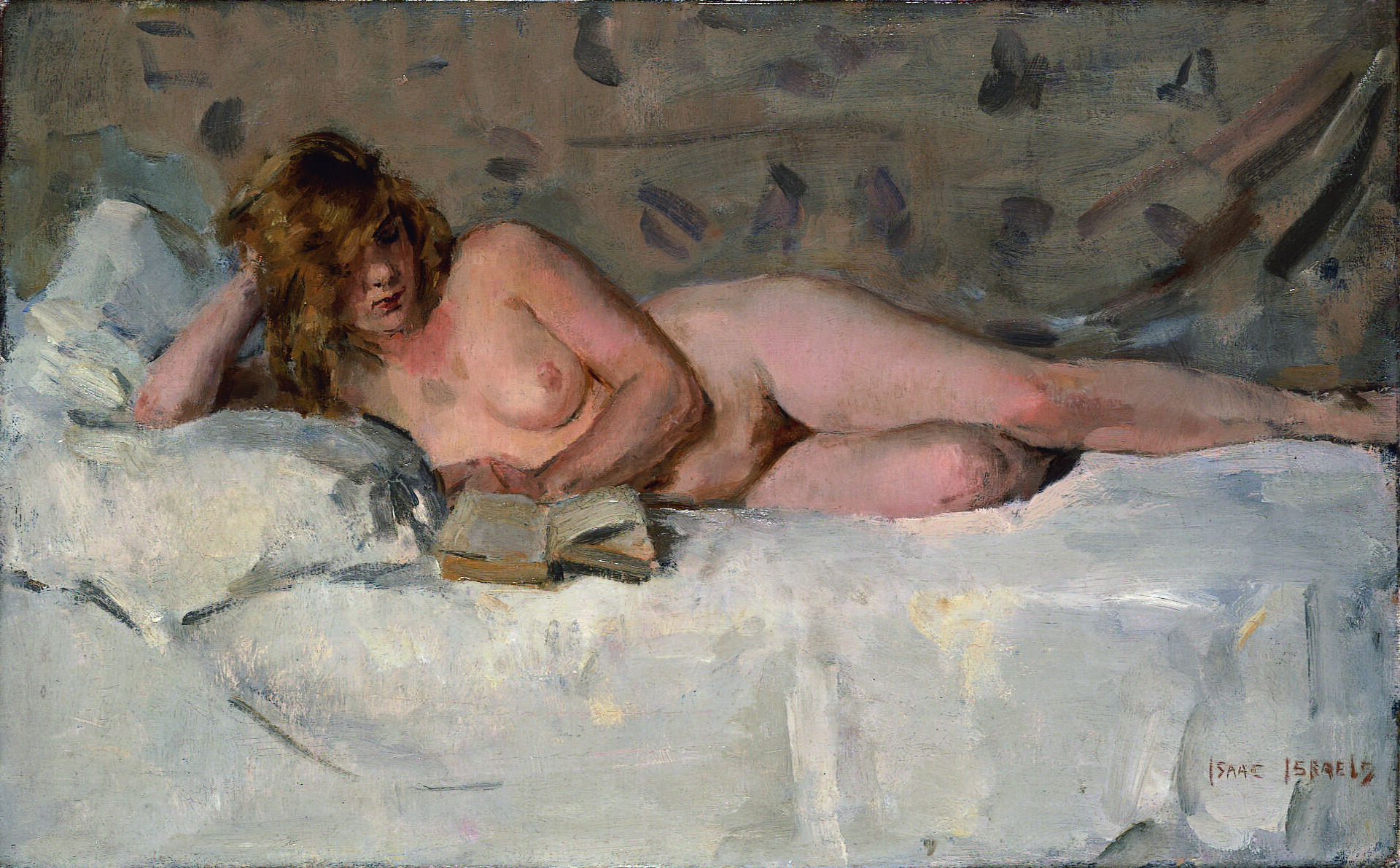
Reclining Nude, c. 1894–1900

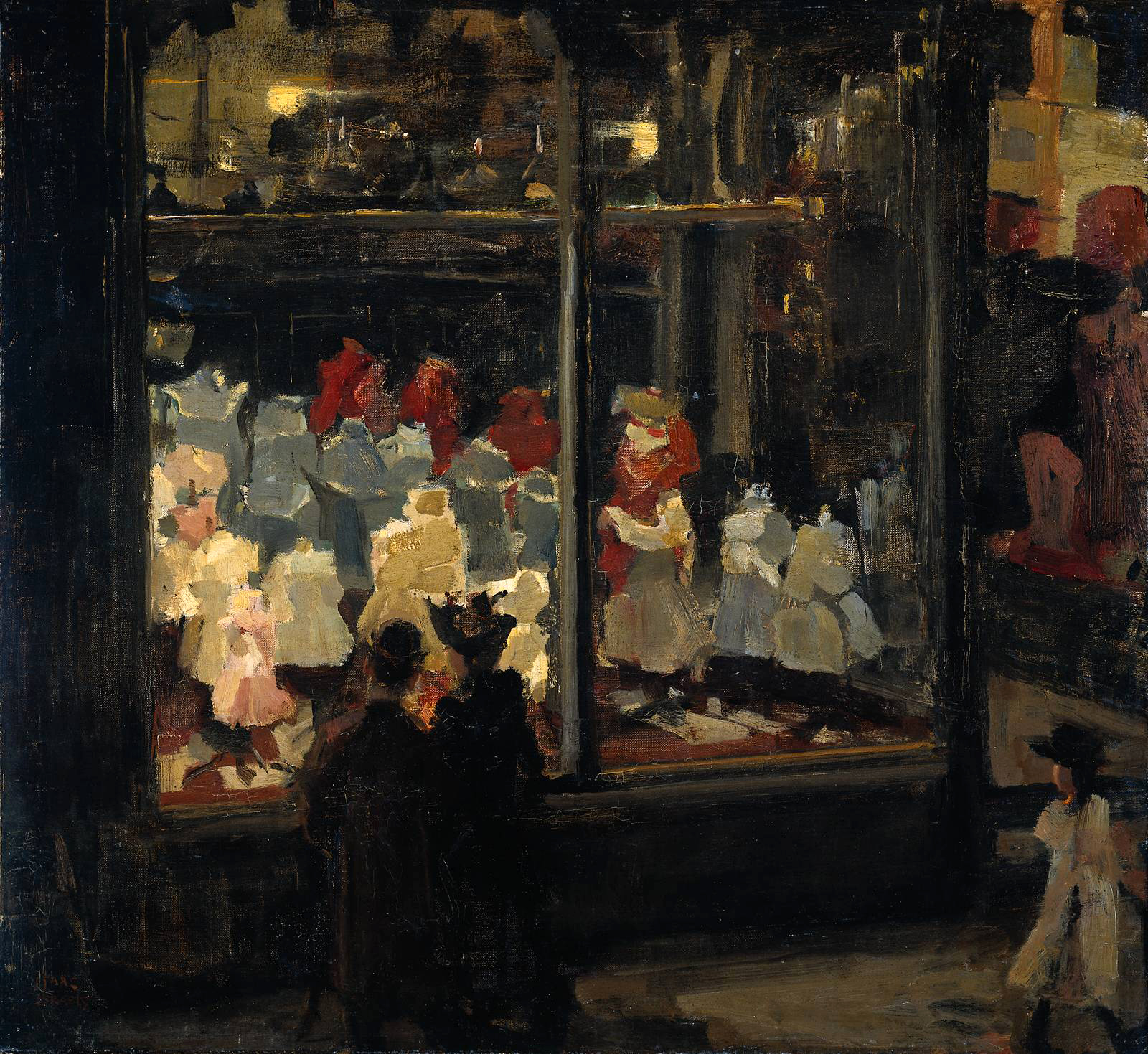
Shop window (Etalage), painted between 1894 and 1898

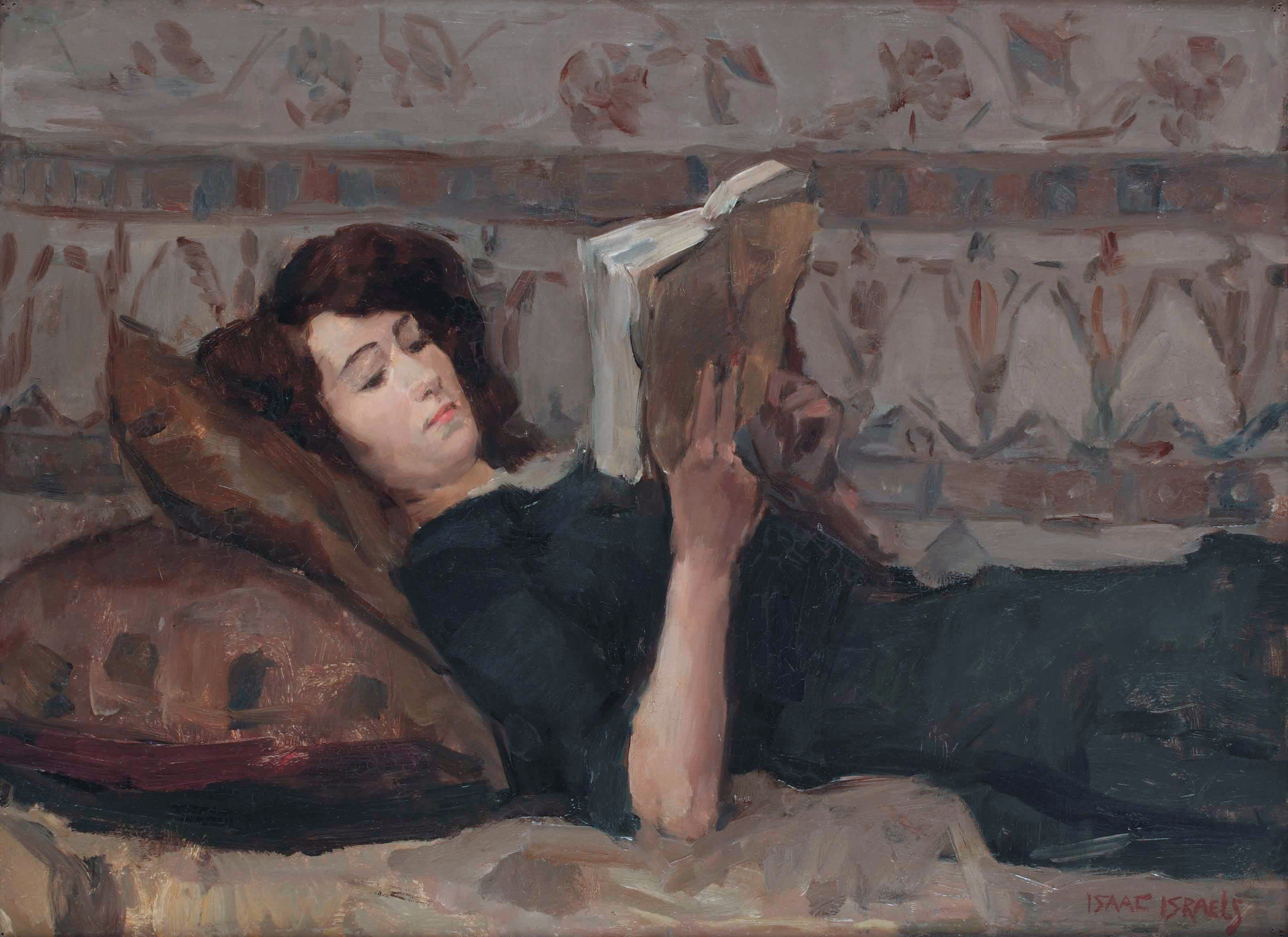
Girl reading on a sofa c. 1920
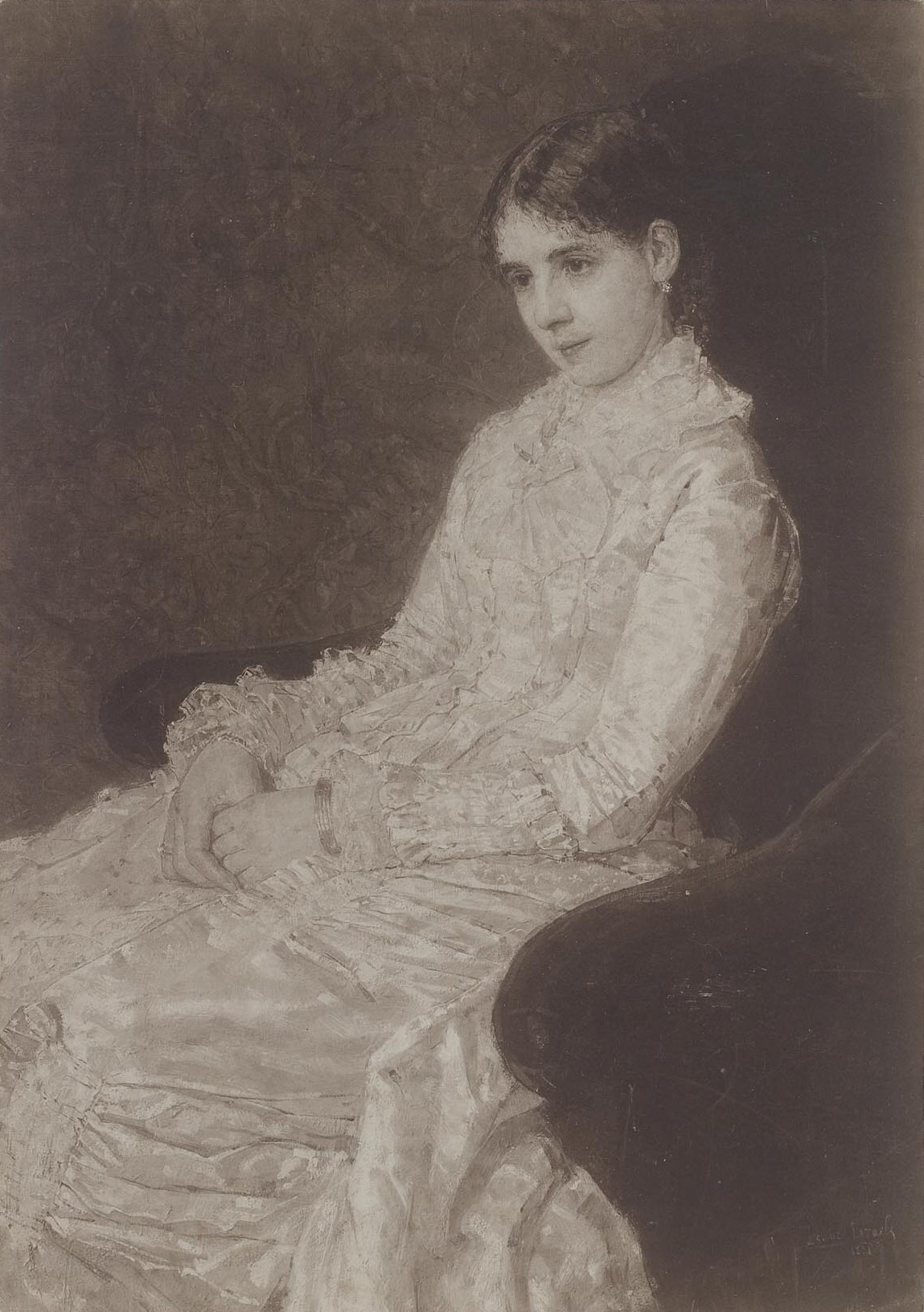
Portrait of Nanette Enthoven, oil on canvas, 1881 (Note: Portrait of Nanette Enthoven (1852- before 1903), oil on canvas, 64 x 46 cm, 1881, an early work painted when Isaac was just 16 years old.)

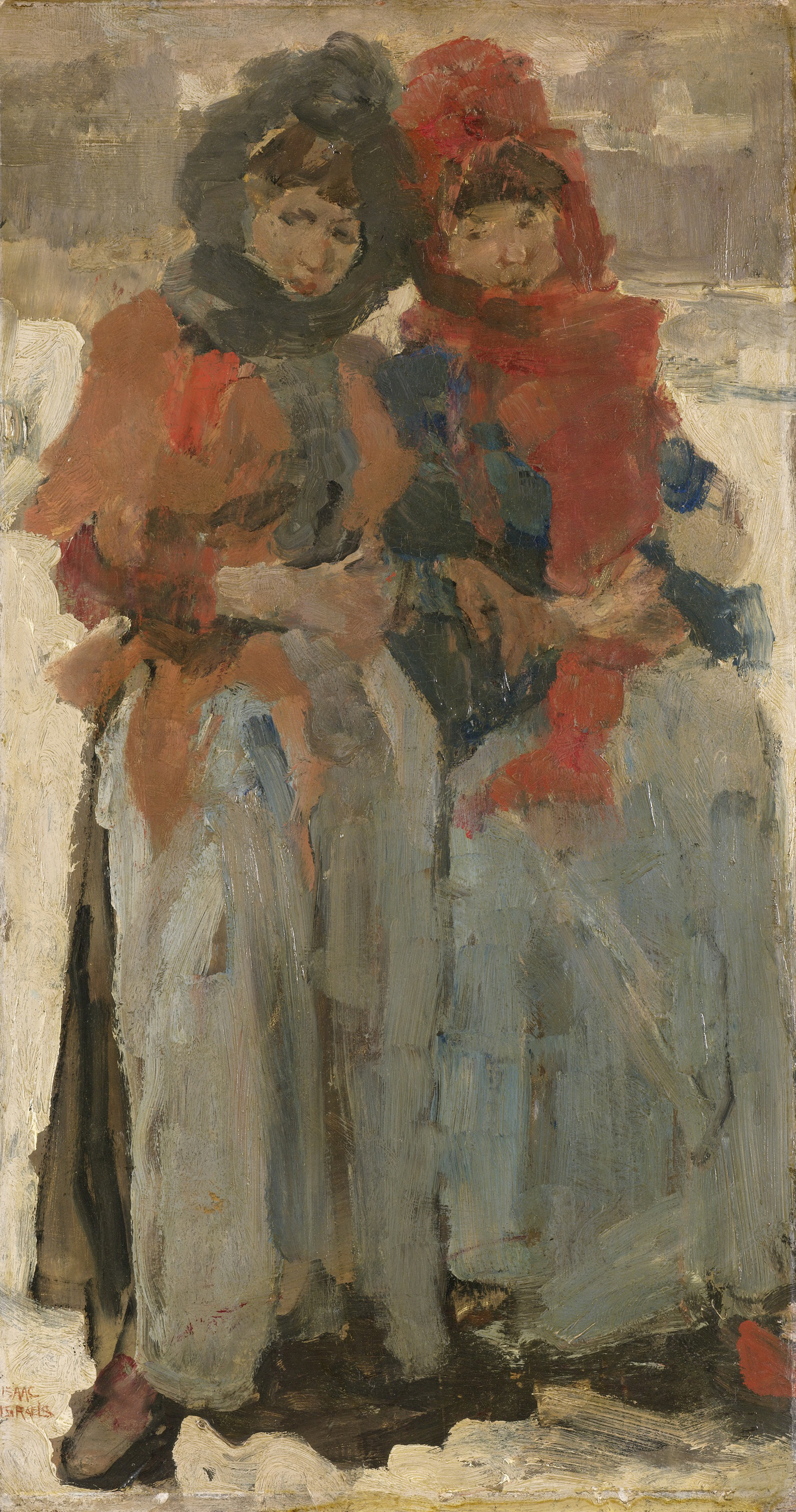
Two Girls in the Snow, 1894, Rijksmuseum

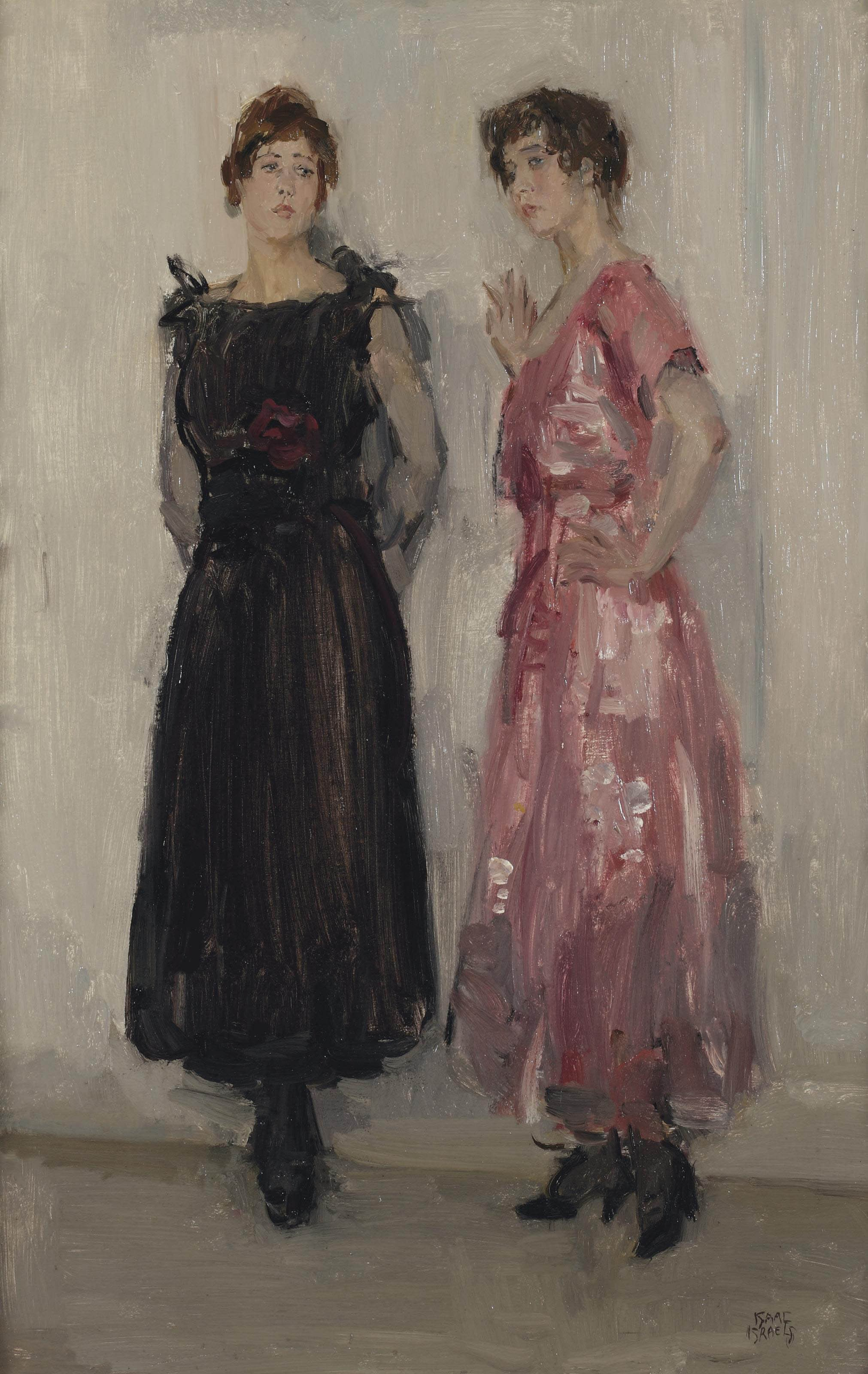
Ippy and Gertie Posing at Fashion House Hirsch, Amsterdam, ca. 1916

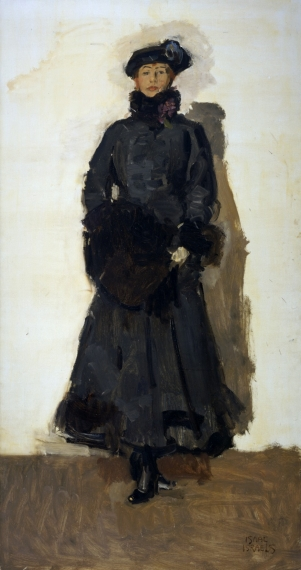
Painting of Mata Hari by Isaac Israëls, 1916

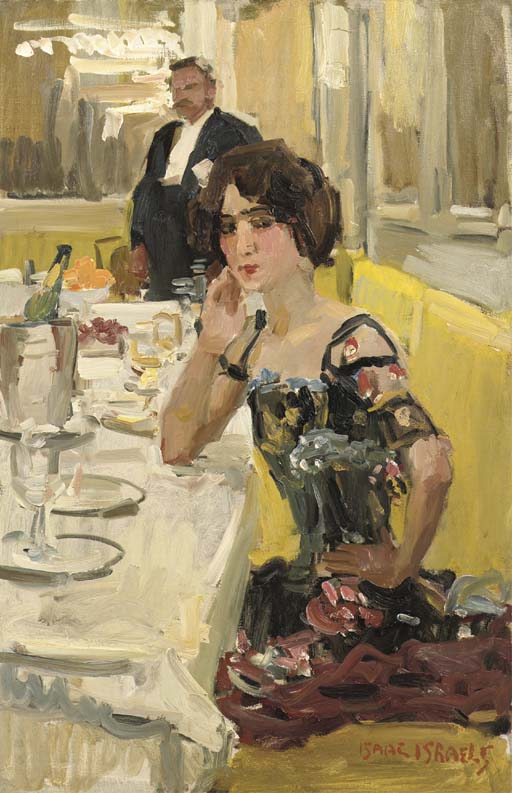
A table au Restaurant Le Perroquet, Paris, between 1905 and 1923 (The restaurant is on the mezzanine of the foyer under the large glass roof of Casino de Paris)
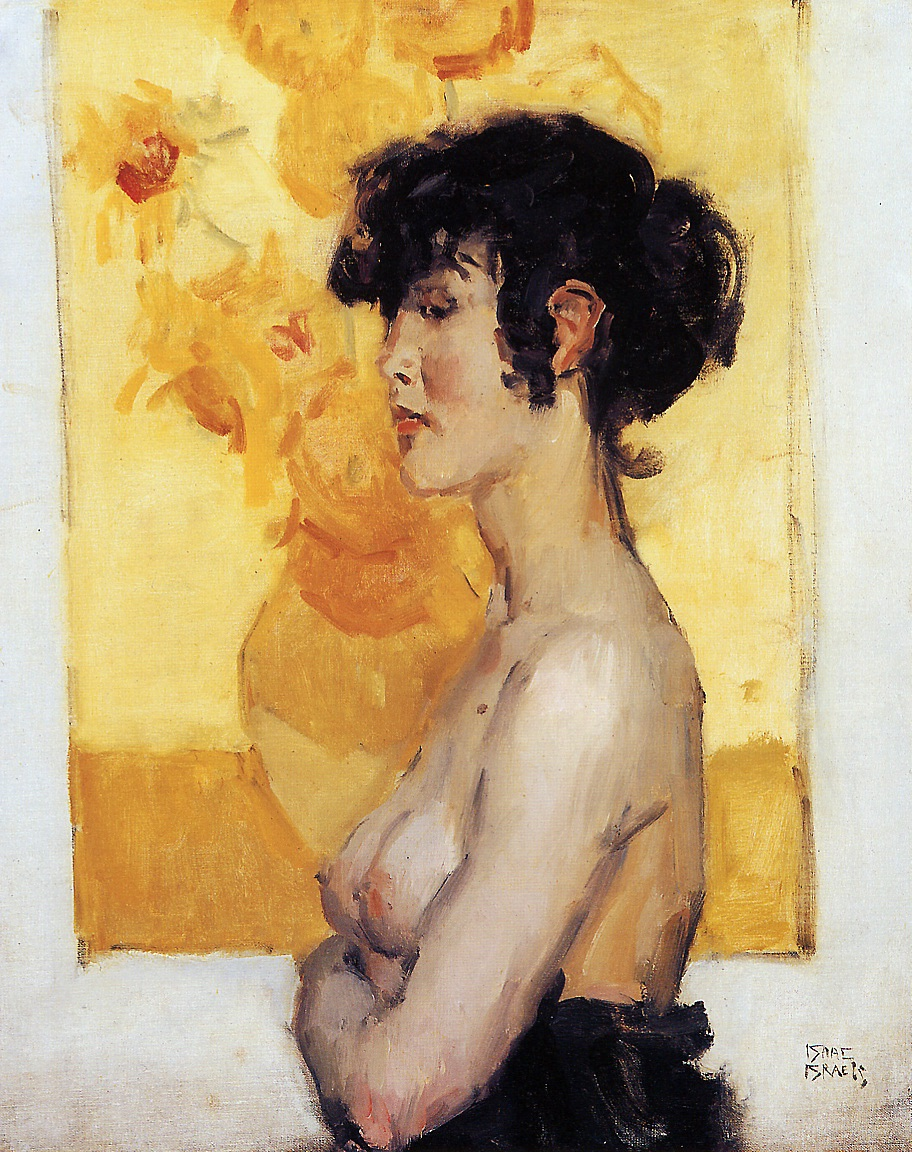
Woman in Profile in Front of Van Gogh's Sunflowers, 1918, Museum de Fundatie, Zwolle (Note: Around 1917 Israëls borrowed the fourth version of van Gogh's Sunflowers (now in the National Gallery, London) from Jo Bonger and used it as a backdrop for several of his portraits, of which this example and Homage to Van Gogh (Blue Blouse) are the best known. Isaac's father Josef was an important influence on van Gogh.)

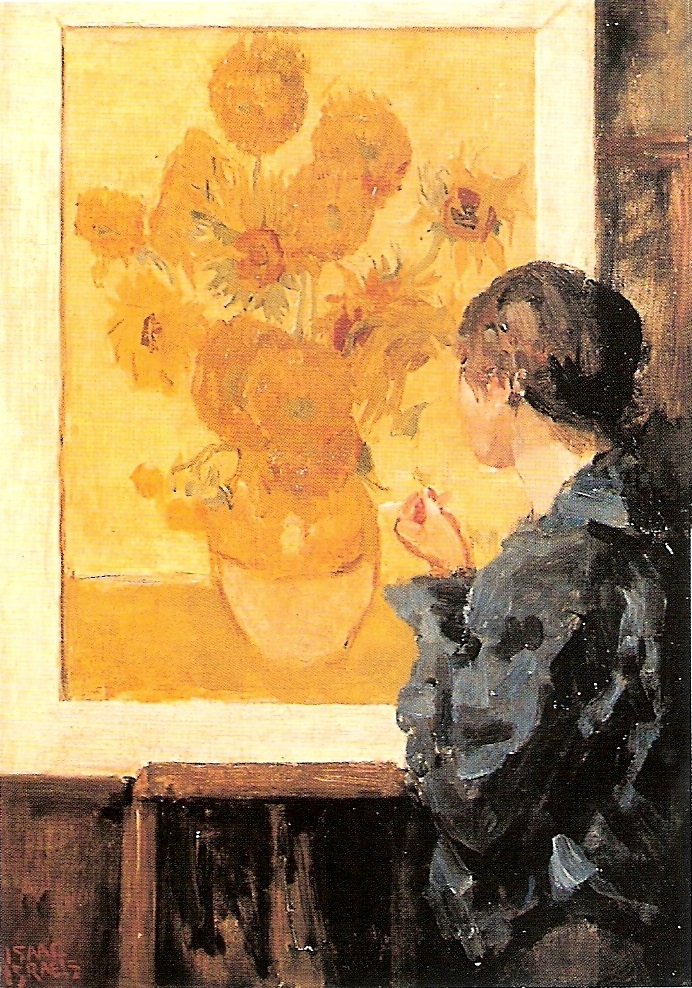
Homage to Van Gogh (Blue Blouse)

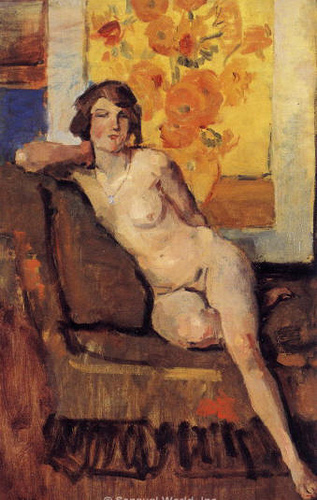
Naakt, model voor Van Goghs Zonnebloemen

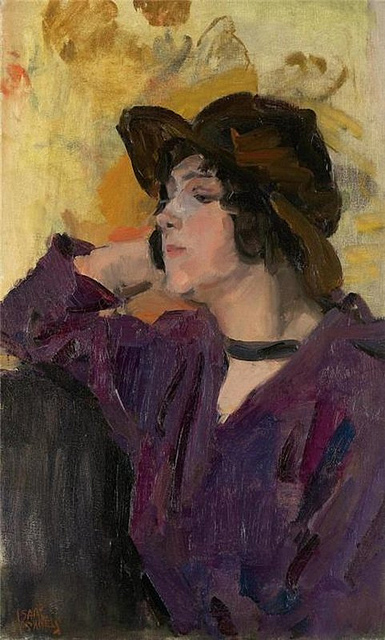
Vrouw voor Van Goghs Zonnebloemen

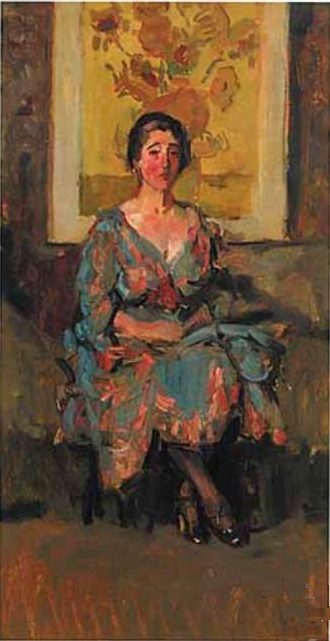
Zittende vrouw voor Van Goghs Zonnebloemen
