= Hessel (disambiguation) =

The Hessel is a river in Germany.

Hessel may also refer to:

- Hessel (given name)
- Hessel (surname)
- Hessel, Michigan, a town in Clark Township, Michigan, United States
- Alte Hessel, a tributary of the Hessel in Gütersloh district, North Rhine-Westphalia
- Hessel (North Denmark Region) a farm in Denmark, that have much history
- Hessel (singer) (born 1955), Dutch singer

== See also ==
- Eric Hessels, Canadian physicist
- Jean Hessels (1522–1566), Belgian theologian
- Willem Hessels van Est (1542–1613), Dutch Catholic commentator on the Pauline epistles
- Hessle, town in the East Riding of Yorkshire, England
