= Hesselink =

Hesselink is a Dutch surname. It is a patronymic surname after an ancestor called Hessel or Hessel.

- Abraham Hesselink, Dutch sculptor
- I. John Hesselink, American academic
- Jan Vennegoor of Hesselink (born 1978), Dutch footballer
- Lambertus Hesselink, Electrical engineer
- Lucas Vennegoor of Hesselink (born 2006), Dutch football player
- Martijn Hesselink, Dutch legal academic
- Sara Trobäck Hesselink or Sara Trobäck
- Willem Hesselink (1878–1973), Dutch footballer

== See also ==
- Hesseling
- Hessling
