= Halstenbecker Bach =

River in Germany

Location
- Country: Germany
- States: North Rhine-Westphalia

Physical characteristics
- Source
  - elevation: 87 m
- Mouth
  - location: Oberwiesengraben
  - coordinates: 52.0396°N 8.2144°E
  - elevation: 69 m
- Length: 4.6 km

Basin features
- Progression: Oberwiesengraben→Bruchbach→ Hessel→ Ems→ North Sea

Halstenbecker Bach is a small river of North Rhine-Westphalia, Germany. It is about 4.6 km long and flows into the Oberwiesengraben near Oesterweg.

== See also ==
- List of rivers of North Rhine-Westphalia
