= Rolfbach =

River in Germany

Location
- Country: Germany
- States: North Rhine-Westphalia

Physical characteristics
- Mouth
  - location: Bruchbach
  - coordinates: 52.0700°N 8.2151°E

Basin features
- Progression: Bruchbach→ Hessel→ Ems→ North Sea

Rolfbach is a small river of North Rhine-Westphalia, Germany. It is 5.1 km (3.2 mi) long and flows into the Bruchbach as a left tributary near Versmold.

== See also ==
- List of rivers of North Rhine-Westphalia
