= Somebody Told Me (disambiguation) =

"Somebody Told Me" is a 2004 song by the Killers.

Somebody Told Me may also refer to:

- Somebody Told Me, a SIBA Book Award winner by Rick Bragg
- "Somebody Told Me (Now I Believe Them)", song by Strong Bad from Strong Bad Sings
- "Somebody Told Me", song by Charlie Puth from Voicenotes
- "Somebody Told Me", song by Eurythmics from Sweet Dreams (Are Made of This)
- "Somebody Told Me", song by Will to Power from Will to Power
- "Somebody Told Me", song by Das EFX from album Generation EFX
- "Somebody Told Me", song by Daniel Bedingfield, the B-side of "The Way"
- "Somebody Told Me", song by Hessel
- "Somebody Told Me", song by Little Milton
