= The Stone Breakers =

1849 painting by Gustave Courbet

- Les Casseurs de pierres (French)
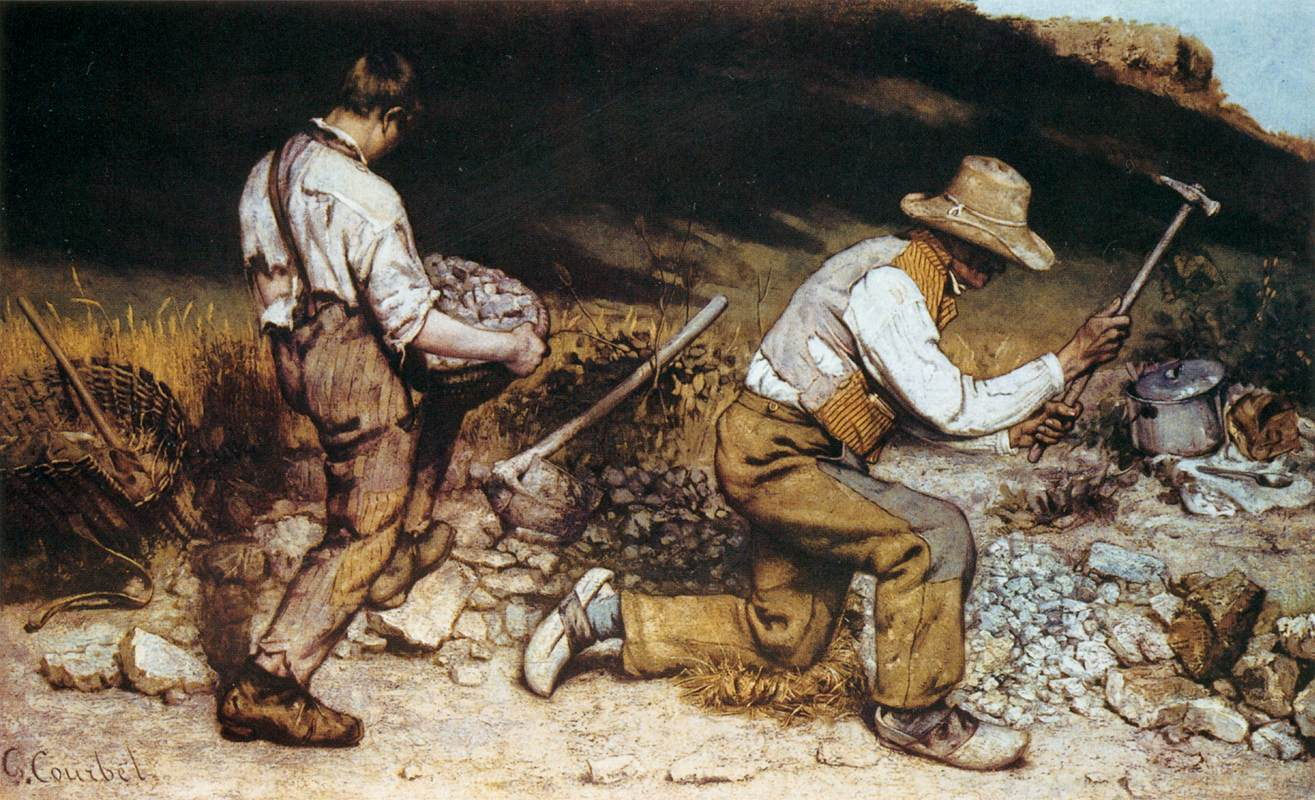
- Les Casseurs de pierres
- Artist: Gustave Courbet
- Year: 1849
- Medium: Oil-on-canvas
- Movement: Realism (arts)
- Subject: Work
- Dimensions: 1.5 m × 2.6 m (4.9 ft × 8.5 ft)
- Condition: Generally believed to be destroyed during the Allied bombing of Dresden in 1945
- Location: Gemäldegalerie Alte Meister, Dresden (until 1945)
- Followed by: Les Casseurs de pierres c. (1849)

The Stone Breakers (French: Les Casseurs de pierres), also known as Stonebreakers, was an 1849 oil painting on canvas by the French painter Gustave Courbet. Now destroyed, the image remains an often-cited example of the artistic movement Realism.

The painting was exhibited at the Salon of 1850 in Paris where it was criticized by for its depiction of a subject that was not considered proper for high art. Some critics disliked Courbet's application of very thick paint and the poor lighting in the image. Conversely, social theorist Pierre-Joseph Proudhon praised the work and saw it as a successful socialist painting. He called the composition "a masterpiece in its genre". By 1915, it was considered to be a very "important work".

Courbet produced two versions of the painting. The version displayed at the 1850 Paris Salon was in the collection of the Gemäldegalerie Alte Meister in Dresden. At the time of its acquisition by the museum, the painting was referred to as "Courbet's monumental masterpiece". It has been written that the painting was destroyed in 1945 as part of the Bombing of Dresden, being in a cart bound to evacuate the city that caught on fire. Richard Raskin though, wrote in 1988 that the Museum has the painting documented as "missing" officially and was not out on the doomed cart, instead being transferred in 1944. The second version, a reversed image, survived the war and is in the Oskar Reinhart Collection in Winterthur.

== History ==
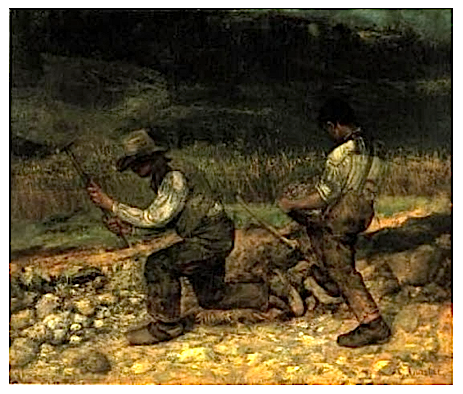
Gustave Courbet, Les Casseurs de pierres (1849) Oskar Reinhart Collection, Winterthur

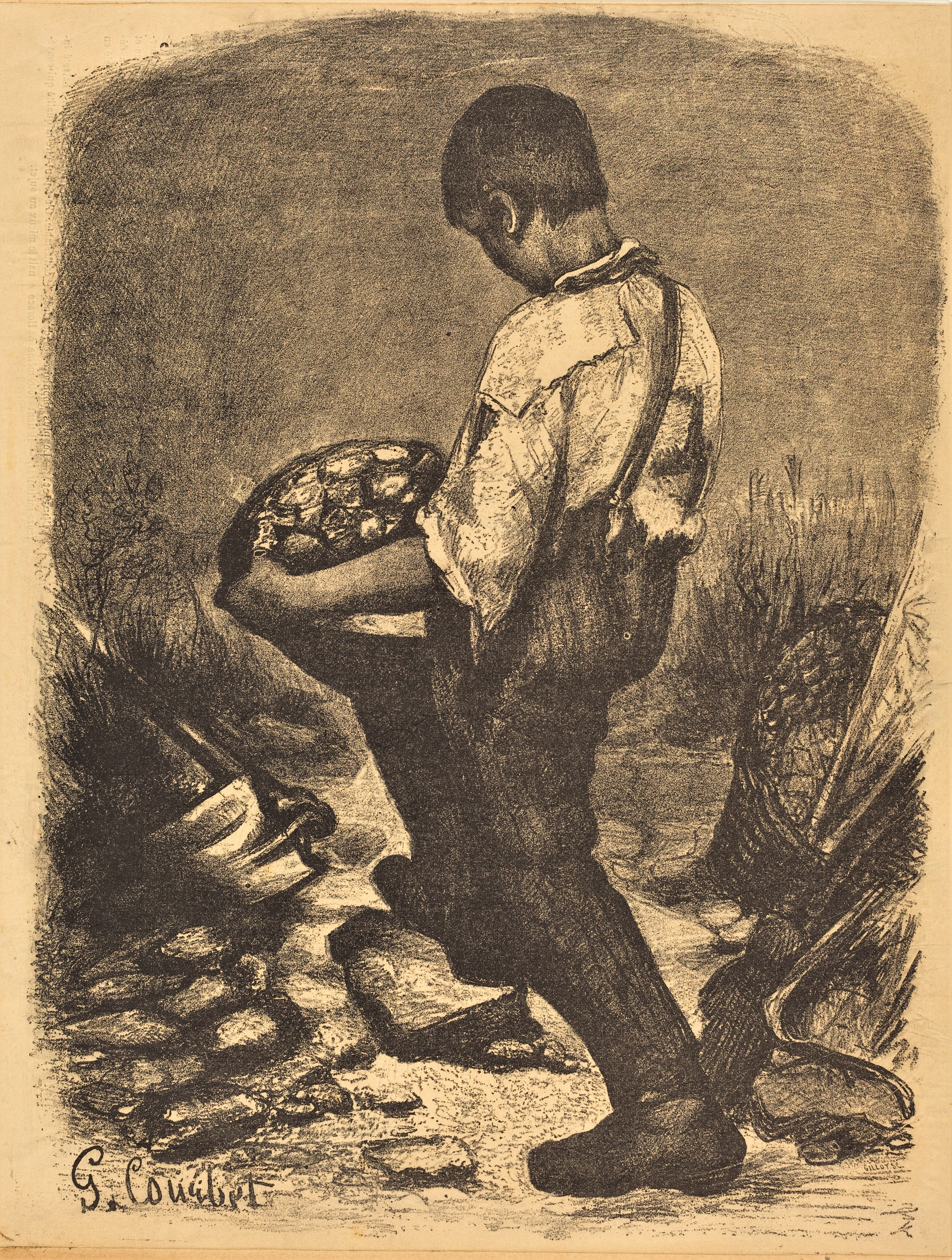
Firmin Gillot (after Gustave Courbet), The Stone Breaker (undated), National Gallery of Art Washington D.C.

Gustave Courbet was a leader of the artistic movement Realism, which he described it as "my way of seeing". In 1855, Courbet wrote that the "title of Realist was thrust upon me". He insisted on painting subjects from life, famously stating that he could not paint an angel because he never saw one.

Courbet began work on The Stone Breakers in November 1849 after seeing two laborers breaking rocks along the road. Near the end of November 1849 Courbet sent a letter to his friends, French historian Francis Wey and his wife Marie Wey, describing how he found inspiration for the painting:

I had taken our carriage to go to the Château of Saint-Denis to paint a landscape. Near Maisières I stopped to consider two men breaking stones on the road. One rarely encounters the most complete expression of poverty, so right there on the spot I got an idea for a painting. I made a date to meet them at my studio the following morning. And since then I have painted my picture.

Courbet went on to describe the clothing of the two peasants as representative of their low station. He also had sympathy for the two stone breakers and in letters he indicated that he was aware of the separation of classes. In describing the older worker he used the French word courbé (bent), which may have been a pun on his own last name Courbet.

The Stone Breakers was first exhibited at the Paris Salon of 1850–1851. Courbet created two versions of the painting. The second version of the painting is a mirror image and it is in the Oskar Reinhart Collection in Winterthur. Courbet signed it in the lower right corner. The second version is smaller, measuring 56 cm × 85 cm (22 in × 33 in), and it is darker.

Around 1864, Courbet created a drawing of the younger person portrayed in The Stone Breakers. The drawing is titled, A young stone breaker. It is a black crayon drawing on white paper and it is 29.5 cm × 21.1 cm (11.6 in × 8.3 in). The work is in the Ashmolean Museum at the University of Oxford. The National Gallery of Art in Washington D.C., also has a similar image of the young stone breaker. The image is attributed to Firmin Gillot and Courbet and it is from the René Huyghe collection. The dimensions of the work are 30.1 cm × 23.1 cm (11.9 in × 9.1 in).

Before World War II the one version of the painting was housed at the Gemäldegalerie Alte Meister in Dresden. The painting was acquired by the museum around 1882 and it was referred to as "Courbet's monumental masterpiece." During World War II, from 13 to 15 February 1945, as the Allies continuously bombed the city of Dresden, Germany, German troops hastily loaded artworks from Dresden's galleries and museums onto trucks. It has been written that The Stone Breakers was destroyed, along with 153 other paintings, when a transport vehicle moving the pictures to the Königstein Fortress, near Dresden, was bombed by Allied forces. In 1988, Richard Raskin, a German art historian and then professor at Aarhus University wrote in a book dedicated to the work that the painting was in fact not on the doomed transport and instead had gone missing in 1944 after being transferred out of the museum.

== Description and analysis ==
The Stone Breakers is still considered one of the most famous examples of the artistic movement Courbet termed "Realism". It depicts two peasants (a young man and an old man) breaking rocks. The men are shown as two road laborers in tattered clothing. wearing wooden clogs, which the press of the day satirized, creating exaggerated caricatures of the size of the wooden clogs on one of the subjects.

The men in tattered clothing represented the oppressed workers who toiled breaking rocks. The painting might have caused viewers to feel uneasy because the men had tools and rocks which may be considered weapons. The men had long-handled hammers. Courbet may have also encouraged the uneasiness by not showing the faces of the two men. The men's faces are likely not shown because they serve as representatives of the common workers. The figures in the painting perform repetitive menial labor and they demonstrate the injustice of peasant life.

Courbet described the painting by saying:

On one side is an old man of seventy, bent over his work, his sledgehammer raised, his skin parched by the sun, his head shaded by a straw hat; his trousers of coarse material, are completely patched; and in his cracked sabots you can see his bare heels sticking out of socks that were once blue. On the other side is a young man with swarthy skin, his head covered with dust; his disgusting shirt all in tatters reveals his arms and parts of his back; a leather suspender holds up what is left of his trousers, and his mud caked leather boots show gaping holes at every side.

In the November 1849 letter to Francis and Marie Wey, Courbet described the painting as being the same size as his other painting (A Burial at Ornans) which was also displayed at the Paris Salon along with The Stone Breakers. The size of A Burial at Ornans was 1.5 m × 2.6 m (4.9 ft × 8.5 ft).

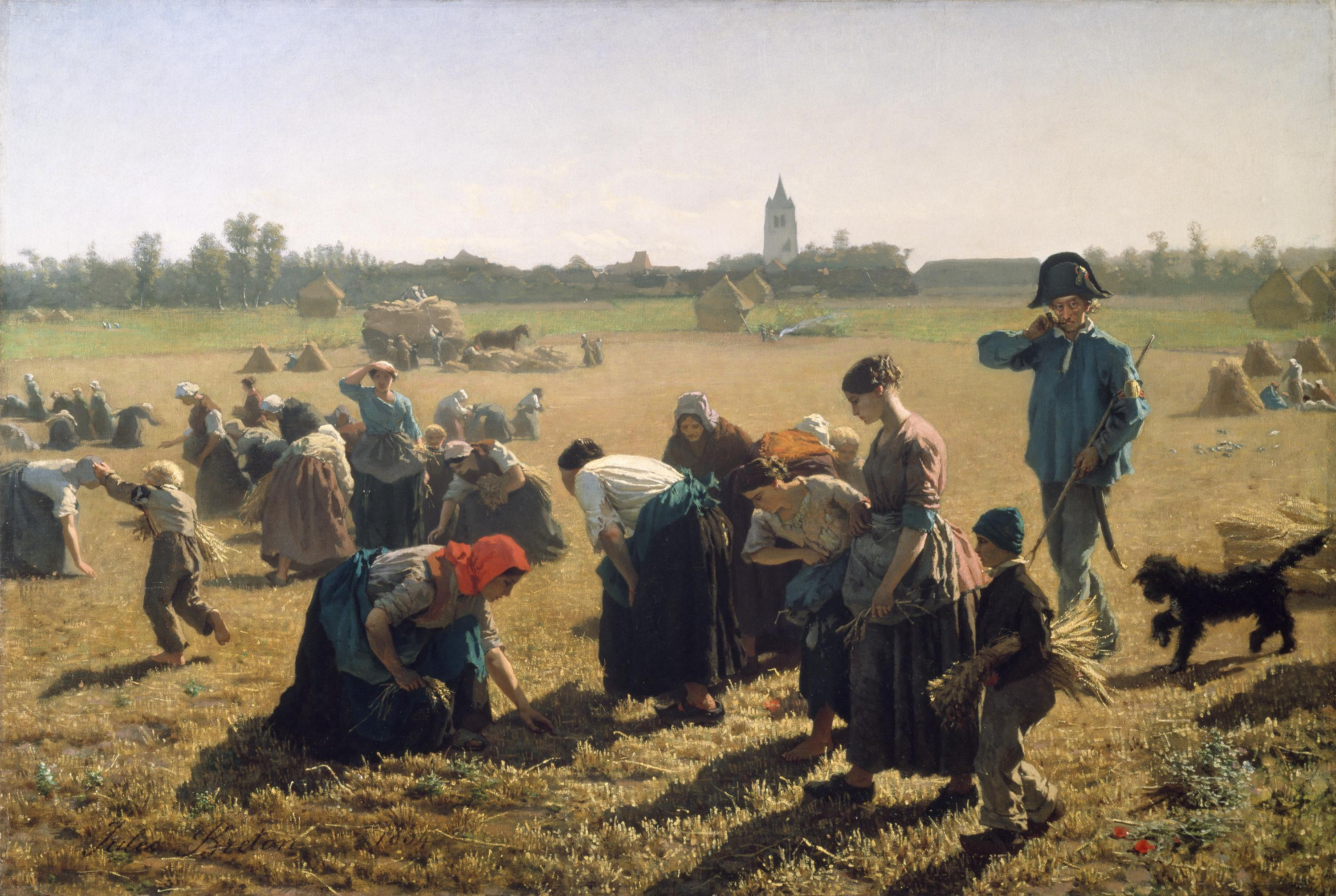
Jules Breton's idealized version of peasants, The Gleaners 1854

Other artists like Jules Breton portrayed the plight of the rural poor. Courbet's peasants in The Stone Breakers are not idealized like those in works such as Breton's 1854 painting, The Gleaners. Early in Breton's career he took inspiration from the realism that Courbet was painting. As Breton's career progressed he began to create idealized images of peasants and poor people.

The Stone Breakers was controversial at the Paris Salon. The depiction of realistic subjects who were toiling in misery was considered inappropriate. The lowborn workers displayed on the large canvas were considered a portrayal of ugliness. With the painting Courbet achieved notoriety and the composition was considered to be a political statement supporting socialist ideals. It was said that the painting "scandalized" those who attended the Paris Salon.

== Reception ==
Before the Paris Salon French poet Max Buchon viewed the painting and described the two men as "the dawn and twilight of modern galley-slave existence". After the 1850 Paris Salon, French diplomat Louis de Geofroy described the sentiment in the painting by saying, "art that is made for everyone should be what everyone sees." L'Illustration published a review of The Stone Breakers and they described it as, "a subject with very little appeal". They described the composition as not treating the subjects with importance and not having appropriate lighting. Fabien Pillet reviewed the work for Le Moniteur Universel and he stated that Courbet should be counted among the painters "who reveal a marked predilection for the least civilized of rustic customs and habits". Some art critics made remarks about the careless thick paint applied by palette knife and others thought the paint thickness conveyed ruggedness. Many critics conveyed the idea that the subject of the painting was not proper for high art. At the Paris Salon the painting was met with hostility and the subject was considered unfit for painting. The workers were also criticized as "brutish, worn and dirty". Writer Jules Champfleury declared, "starting today, critics can get ready to fight for or against realism in art.

French social theorist Pierre-Joseph Proudhon, who was repeatedly portrayed by Courbet, called The Stone Breakers "a masterpiece in its genre". He saw the painting as "a visual condemnation of capitalism and potential for greed". He went on to say that it was a successful case study of a "socialist painting". Courbet stated that the subject had to do with his interest in "real and existing things". By 1915 the painting was considered to be an "important work" and one critic called it an example of the gripping "Truth of life". Art historian Sheila D. Muller has compared the composition's impact with that of Passing Mother's Grave because of the "monumental treatment of the commonplace". In 2009, art historian Kathryn Calley Galitz said, "The Stone Breakers ... challenged convention by rendering scenes from daily life on the large scale previously reserved for history painting and in an emphatically realistic style."

== See also ==
- The Stone Breaker and His Daughter, an 1830 painting by the British artist Edwin Landseer
