= Oberwiesengraben =

River in Germany

Location
- Country: Germany
- States: North Rhine-Westphalia

Physical characteristics
- Mouth
  - location: Bruchbach
  - coordinates: 52.0362°N 8.2094°E

Basin features
- Progression: Bruchbach→ Hessel→ Ems→ North Sea

Oberwiesengraben is a small river of North Rhine-Westphalia, Germany. It is 4.7 km (2.9 mi) long and flows as a left tributaryinto the Bruchbach near Oesterweg.

The river rises in the area of the town of Borgholzhausen west of Casum, flows into the town of Versmold after just a few dozen meters and flows into the Bruchbach east of Oesterweg.

== See also ==
- List of rivers of North Rhine-Westphalia
