= The Gleaner (disambiguation) =

The Gleaner is daily newspaper published in Jamaica, with a Sunday edition named Sunday Gleaner.

The Gleaner may also refer to:

== Newspapers ==
- Gleaner Company in Jamaica, publishers of the newspapers The Gleaner and Sunday Gleaner
- The Daily Gleaner, a newspaper published in the Canadian province of New Brunswick
- The Henderson Gleaner, a newspaper in the U.S. state of Kentucky
- The Gleaner (Quebec), an English-language newspaper in the Canadian province of Quebec
- The Gleaner, a campus newspaper at Rutgers University-Camden in New Jersey
- The Gleaner, a campus newspaper at Canada's Langara College

== Other ==
- The Gleaner (Murray), a book of essays by American feminist Judith Sargent Murray
- The Gleaners, an oil painting by Jean-François Millet composed in 1857
- The Gleaners (Breton painting) is an oil painting by Jules Breton
