= Hessling =

Hessling is a German surname. It may be either a toponymic surname after an abandoned place Heßling or a patronymic surname after an ancestor named Hessel.

- Catherine Hessling (1900–1979), French actress
- Hans Hessling (1903–1995), German actor

== See also ==
- Hesseling
- Hesselink
