= Jozef Israëls Monument =

Sculpture in Groningen, the Netherlands

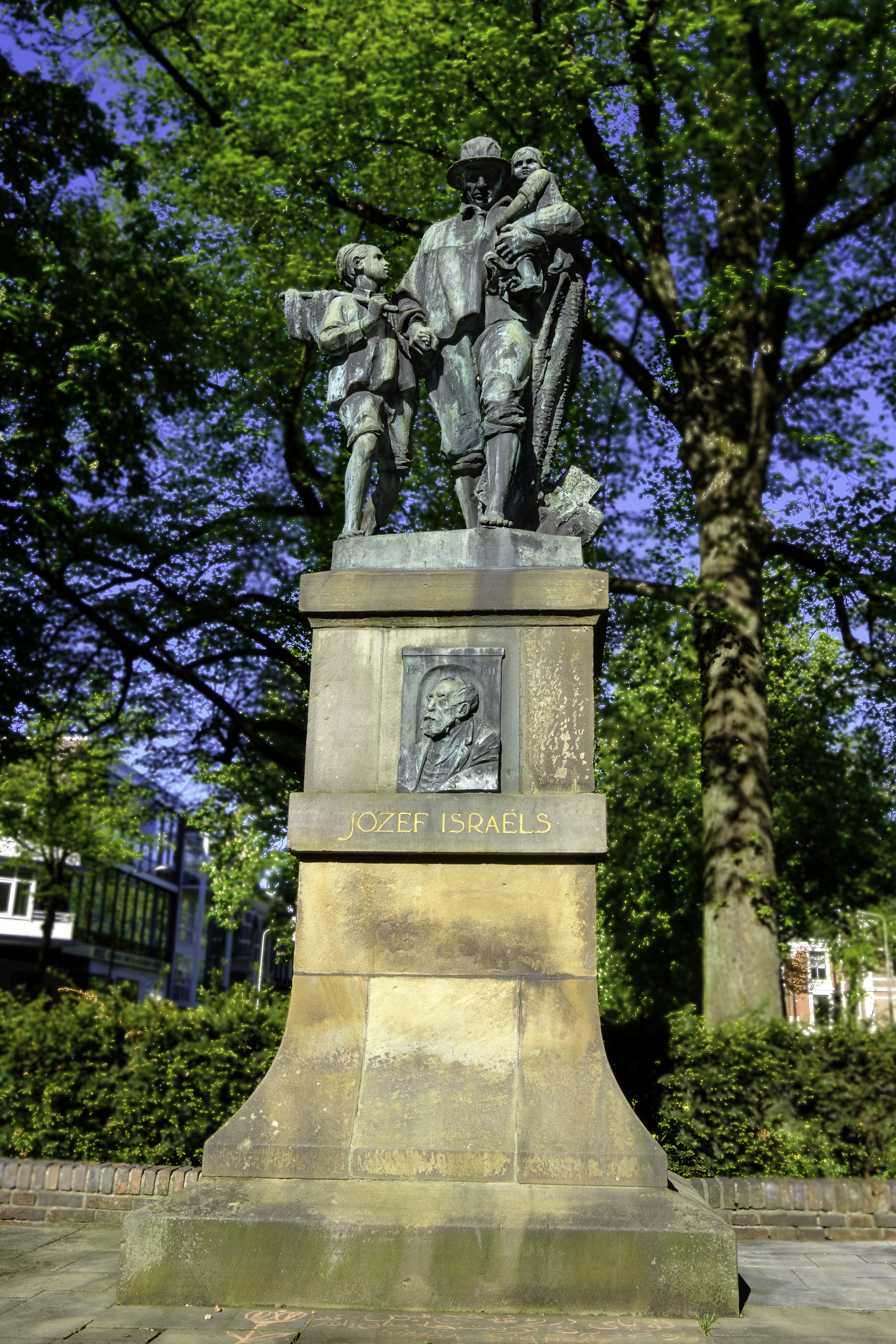
- Artist: Abraham Hesselink
- Completion date: 1916
- Medium: Bronze and stone
- Dimensions: (465 cm (183 in) in)
- Condition: Restored 1946
- Location: Groningen; 53°12′48.2″N 06°34′11.5″E

The Jozef Israëls Monument is a bronze sculpture of 1916 made to honor Jozef Israëls. The sculpture was created by Abraham Hesselink and is displayed in Israëls's birthplace of Groningen, in the Netherlands. During World War II the sculpture was destroyed by fascists and it was restored after the war. The restored sculpture was unveiled in 1946.

== Analysis ==
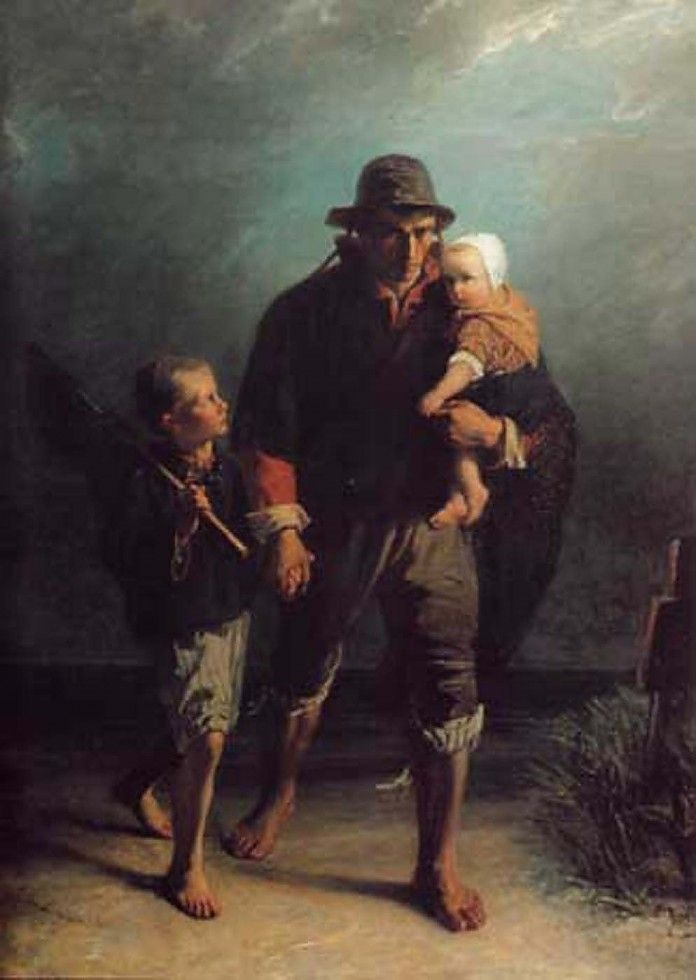
The painting that inspired the monument: Jozef Israëls, Passing Mother's Grave (1856), Groninger Museum, Groningen

The sculpture depicts a fisherman leaving the beach with two children; the man and the boy have fishing nets. The composition is based on that of Israëls's painting Passing Mother's Grave. The painting is a portrayal of a widower walking past the grave of his wife, with his young children. The three people in the image are all barefoot. The man is a fisherman and he is holding a boy's hand and carrying a baby as he passes the headstone of his deceased wife. The sculpture stands at a height of 465 cm (183 in).

== History ==
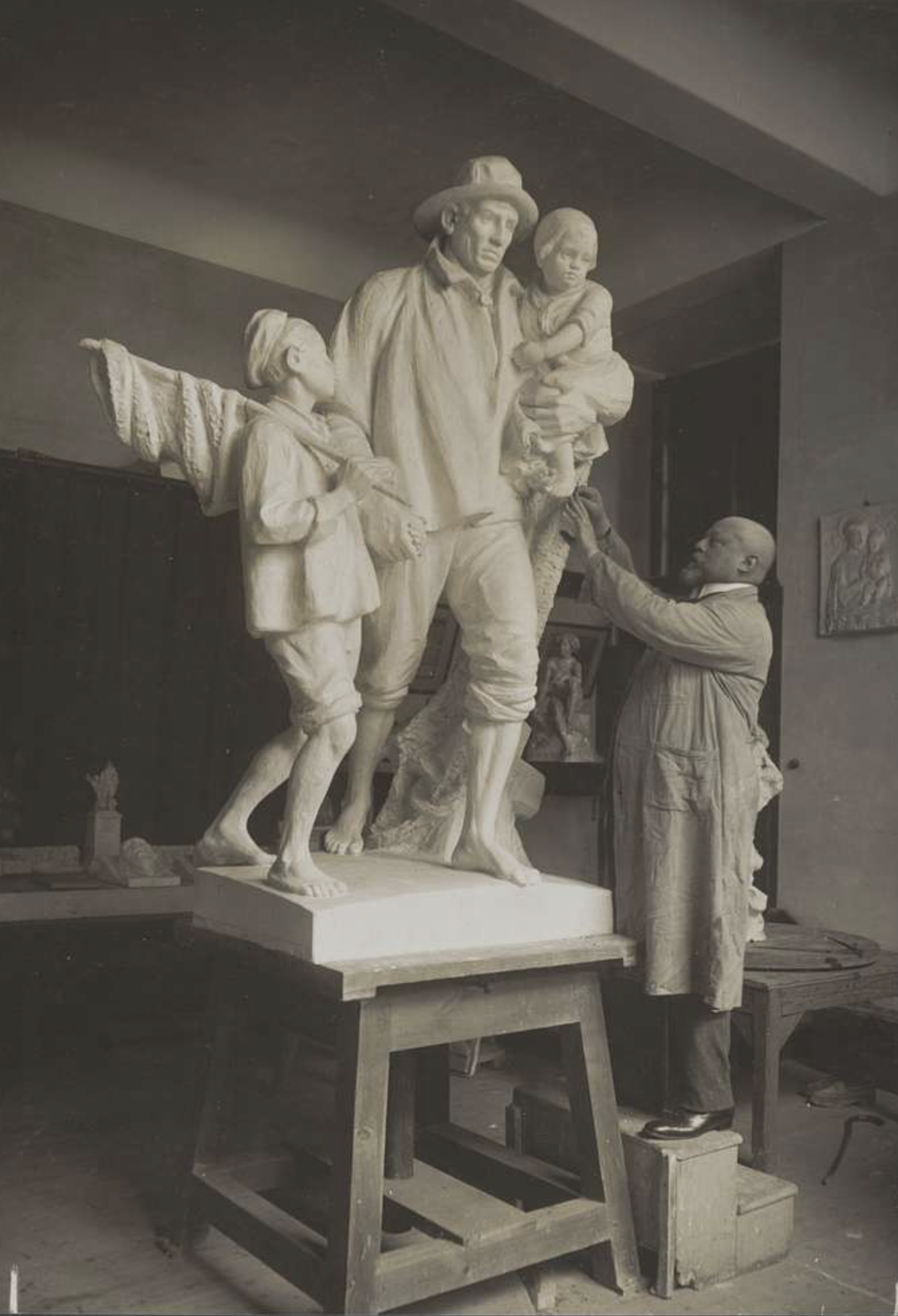
Hesselink working on a plaster cast of the sculptural group in 1917

The sculpture was commissioned by Pictura, an association of art lovers in Groningen, and was executed by Abraham Hesselink. It is signed "A Hesselink / 1916". The sculpture was placed in Groningen to honor the artist Jozef Israëls, who was born there and who lived there into his teenage years. It was modeled on Passing Mother's Grave as that painting was Israëls's most prominent and recognized work, and was considered to be the artist's masterpiece.

The sculpture was badly damaged during World War II. In 1943 it was destroyed by members of the National Socialist Movement in the Netherlands (NSB), a fascist organization. The sculpture was destroyed because Israëls was Jewish. The director of the municipal cleaning service (Mr Koop) collected the debris after the destruction. After the war, Willem Valk restored the sculpture. On 10 August 1946, the restored monument was unveiled by Mayor Pieter Cort van der Linden.
