= Hessel (North Denmark Region) =

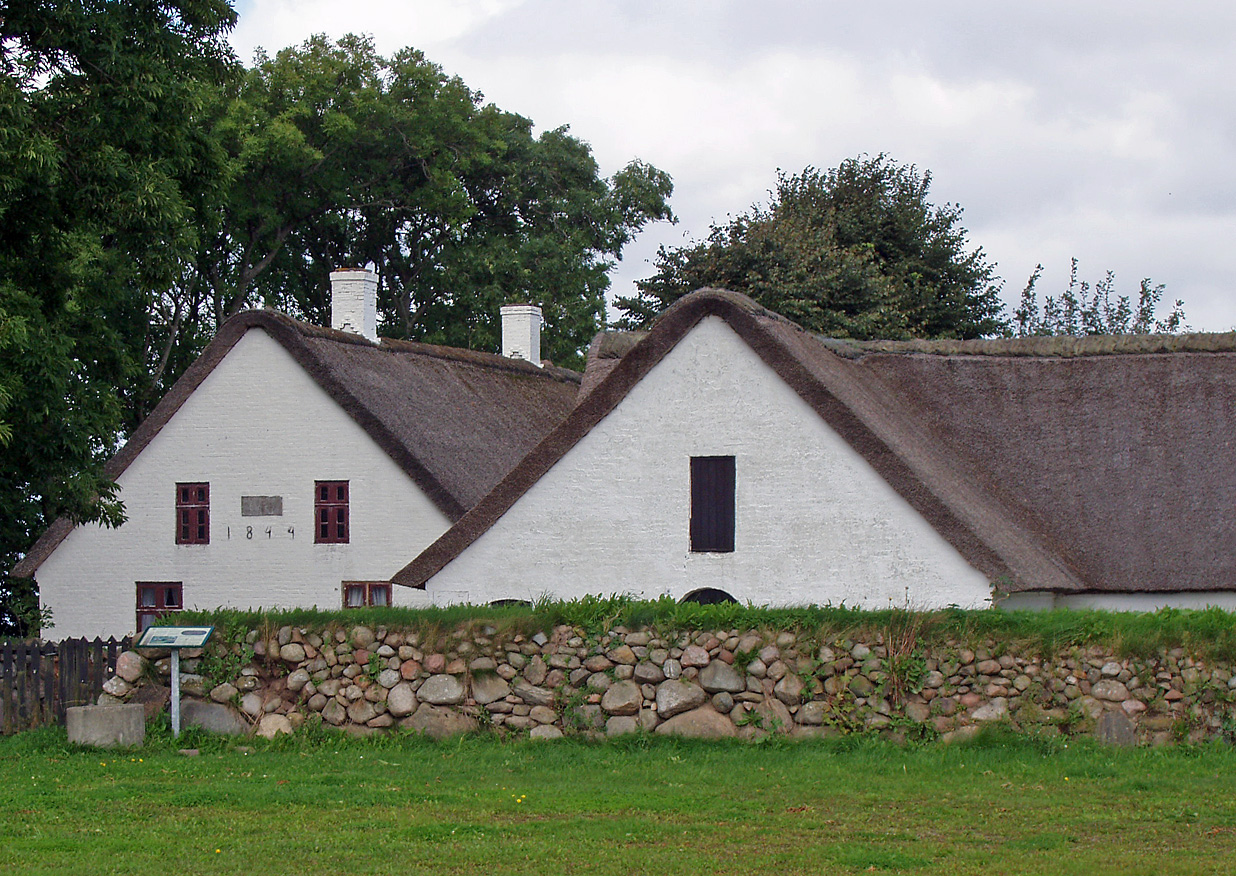
- Established: Before 1391
- Location: Hesselvej 40B, 9640 Farsø
- Coordinates: 56.687744°N 9.191376°E
- Website: Museet Herregården Hessel

Hessel is an old farmhouse, which is mentioned for the first time in 1391. The farm is located in Louns parish, Vesthimmerlands Municipality (formerly Gislum Herred, Aalborg County). Until the Municipal Reform 2007, it was in Farsø Municipality.

Originally, Hessel may have been hide-out for pirates who watched the sailing/voyage on Hvalpsund and Lovns broadg.

In 1704, large parts of Hessel burned. The oldest part is a large high-rise, where the oak tree is from 1600. The main building was originally built in a binder that can still be seen on the side facing the park. The interior of the living room is unchanged since 1800.

Hessel is today an agricultural museum and is open from May to September.

== Owners of Hessel ==
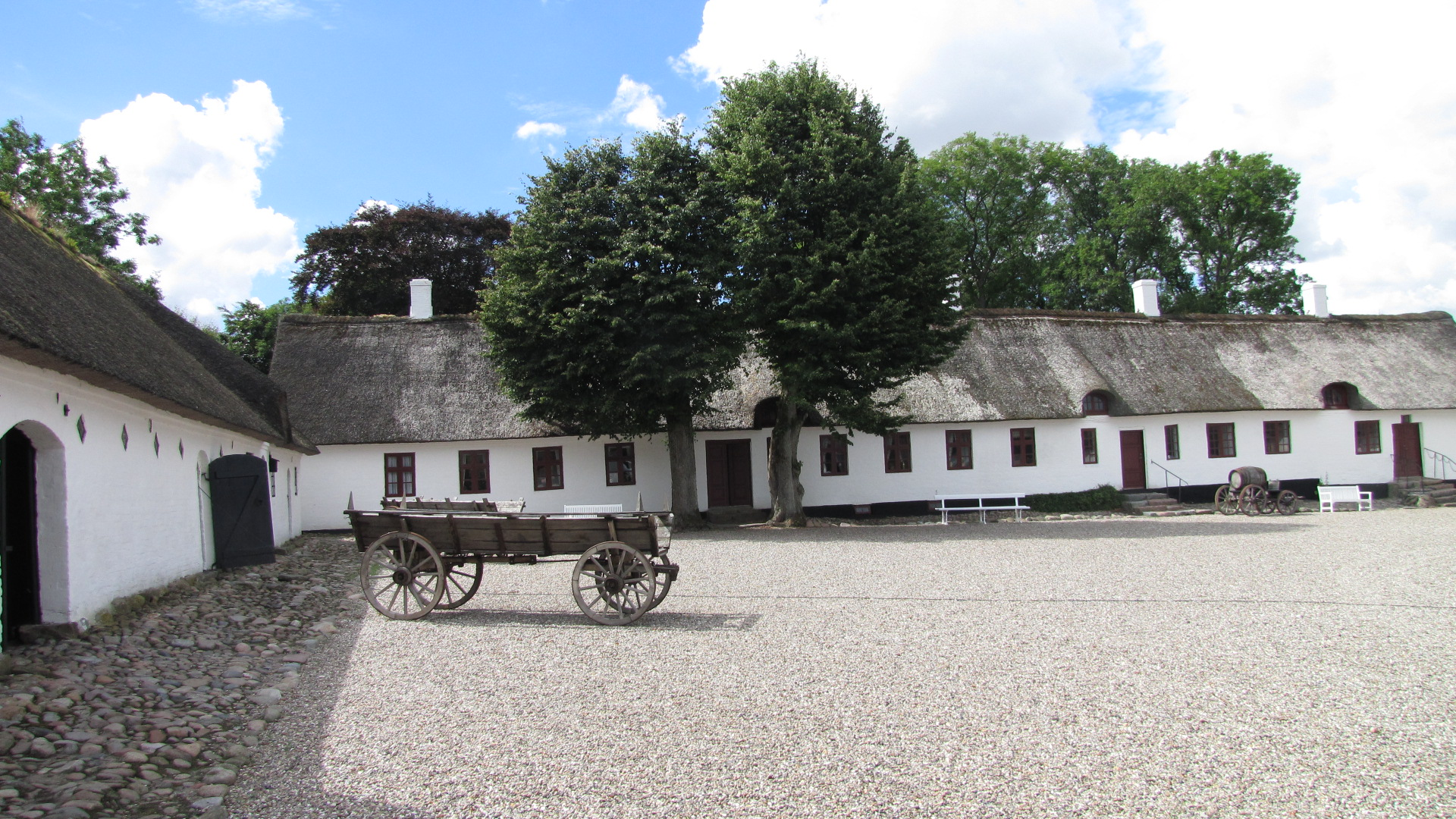
Hessel farm

- (1391-1411) Peder Andersen Munk
- (1411-1430) Jens Terkelsen
- (1430-1470) Unknown owner
- (1470-1480) Peder Raa
- (1480-1532) Unknown owner
- (1532-1538) Niels Mortensen
- (1538-1567) Ukendt ejere
- (1567-1580) Jørgen Lykke
- (1580-1601) Niels Skram
- (1601-1603) Skram
- (1603-1614) Christoffer Lykke
- (1614-1620) Slægten Lykke
- (1620-1647) Ivar Lykke
- (1647-1670) Valdemar Daa
- (1670-1688) Christian Spormann
- (1688-1708) Karen Foss gift Rosenstand
- (1708) Foss
- (1708-1732) Anders Mollerup
- (1732-1734) Peder Mollerup
- (1734-1775) Vincent Lerche
- (1775-1797) Christian Frederik Kaalund
- (1797-1799) Niels Severin Würnfeldt
- (1799-1800) Niels Frederik Hillerup
- (1800-1801) Jørgen Peter Rommedahl / A. H. Rasmussen / Christoffer Nislev
- (1801-1802) Niels Frederik Hillerup
- (1802-1807) N. J. Aagaard
- (1807-1821) N. Rostrup
- (1821-1823) Enke Fru Rostrup
- (1823-1829) P. O. Holm / A. Christensen
- (1829-1863) Jesper Lauritzen Elle
- (1863-1902) Hans Christian Elle
- (1902-1935) Ane Margrethe Elisabeth Elle / Jens Kristian Jensen
- (1935-1966) H. F. Elle-Jensen
- (1966-2007) Nordjyllands Amt
- (2007-) Vesthimmerlands Municipality

== See also ==
- Aars church
- Aggersborg
- Farsø
- Hessel
- Hvalpsund
