= Aabach (Hessel) =

River in Germany

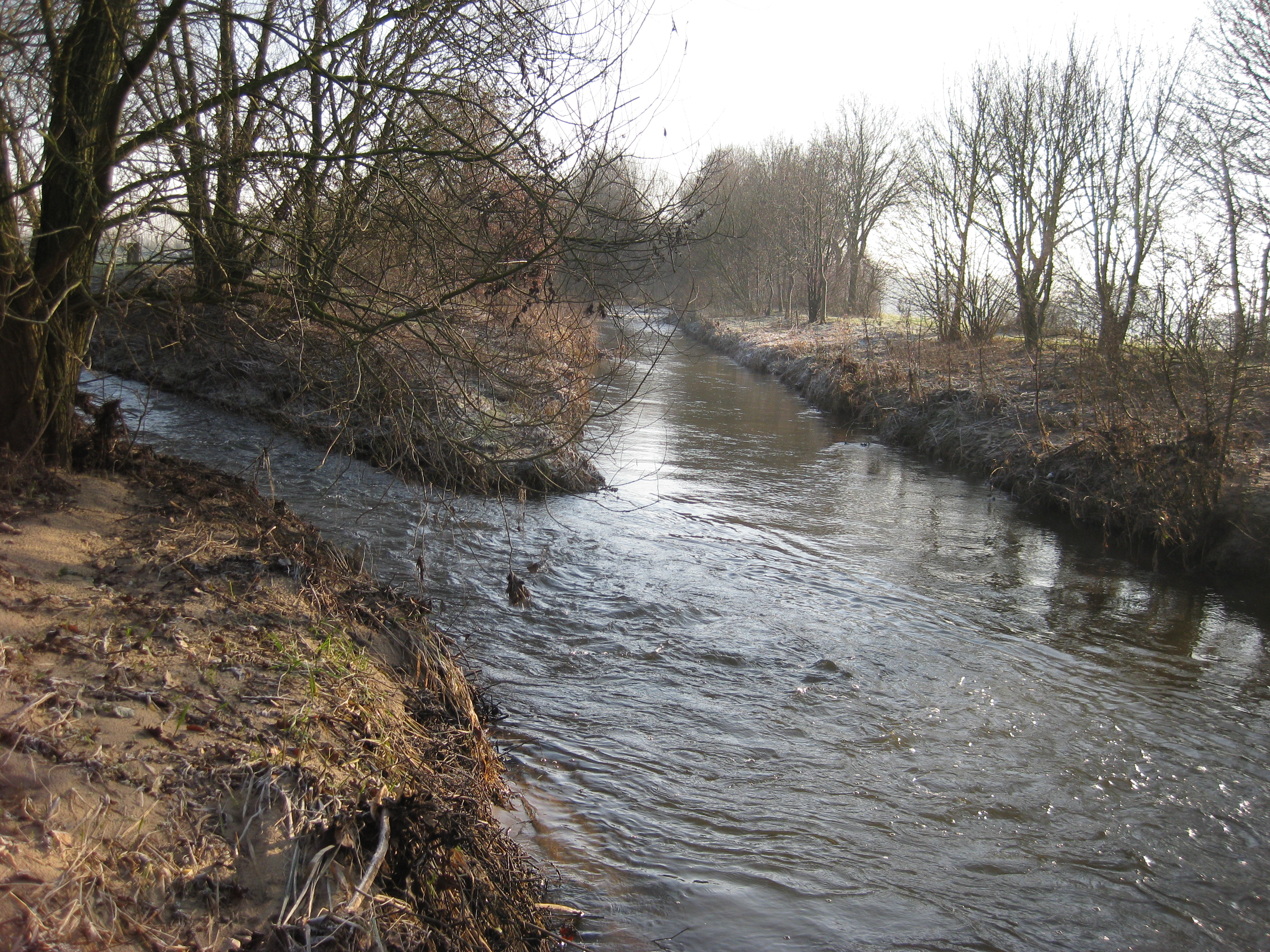

- Mouth

Location
- Country: Germany
- State: North Rhine-Westphalia

Physical characteristics
- Mouth
  - location: Hessel
  - coordinates: 52.0141°N 8.1511°E
- Length: 15.3 km (9.5 mi)

Basin features
- Progression: Hessel→ Ems→ North Sea

Aabach is a small river in the Ems river system, of North Rhine-Westphalia, Germany. It flows into the Hessel near Versmold.

== See also ==
- List of rivers of North Rhine-Westphalia
