= Passing Mother's Grave =

1856 painting by Jozef Israëls

- Langs Moeders Graf (Dutch)
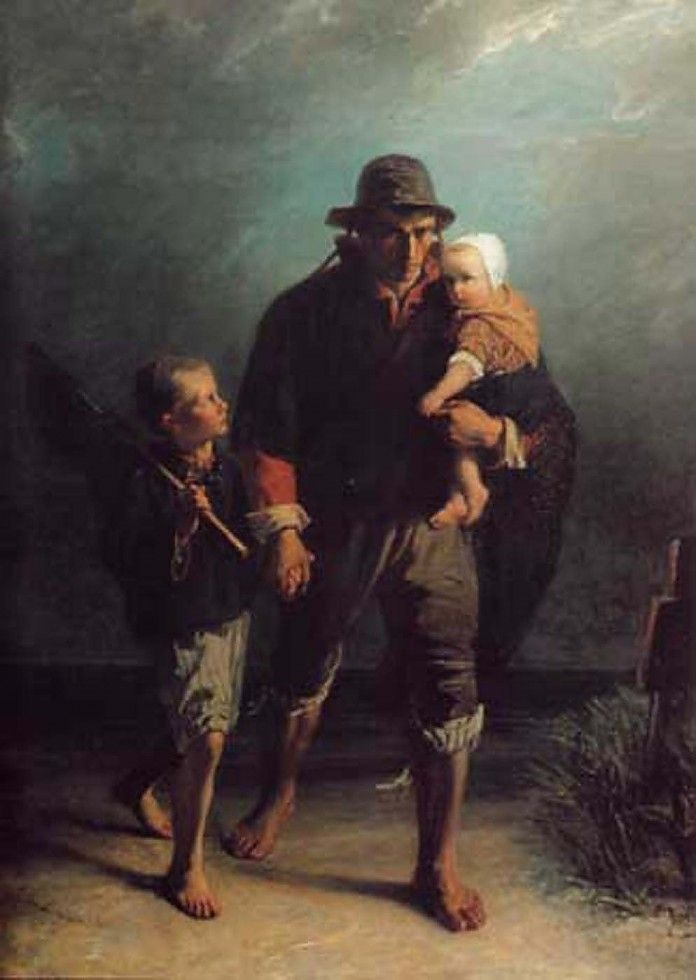
- Artist: Jozef Israëls
- Year: 1856
- Medium: Oil-on-canvas
- Movement: Realism (arts)
- Subject: Peasants
- Dimensions: 274.5 cm (108.1 in) x 207.5 cm (81.7 in)
- Location: Stedelijk Museum Amsterdam
- Owner: Versions; Stedelijk Museum Amsterdam; The New Art Gallery Walsall; Private buyer

Passing Mother's Grave (Dutch: Langs Moeders Graf), also known as Passing the Churchyard, is an oil painting on canvas made in 1856 by Jozef Israëls, a Dutch realist artist and a representative of the Hague School of painters. The subject of the painting is a widowed fisherman walking past his deceased wife's grave with his two children.

In the early stages of his career, Israëls primarily painted portraits, genre scenes, and historical subjects. Passing Mother's Grave marked one of his initial forays into Realism by depicting peasant life and set the stage for the artist's lasting fascination with the theme of fishermen. This painting quickly became one of his most renowned works; it gained popularity and was widely reproduced in print reproductions including several painted copies executed by the artist himself.

The painting's depiction of the working class has been compared with The Stone Breakers, an 1849 painting by the French realist painter Gustave Courbet. The art historian Sheila D. Muller has written that it accomplishes a "monumental treatment of the commonplace". While generally considered among Israëls's most famous and popular paintings, the work has also been criticised as sentimental or "mawkish".

Passing Mother's Grave is considered a prominent example of the Dutch realist movement in the second half of the nineteenth century. It influenced later artists in the Netherlands, including the Post-Impressionist artist Vincent van Gogh, who listed it among his favorite works.

== History ==
Israëls's initial artistic training took place in Academie Minerva, an art school in his native Groningen. In 1842, at the age of twenty, he worked in the Amsterdam studio of the portraitist Jan Adam Kruseman. At night he studied under the Dutch painter Jan Willem Pieneman at the Rijksakademie van beeldende kunsten. Israëls moved to Paris in 1845 and lived there until 1847, studying at the Ecole des Beaux-Arts under the sculptor James Pradier and the painters Horace Vernet and Paul Delaroche.

In 1847, he returned to Amsterdam and enrolled at the Rijksakademie, where he studied under Jan Willem Pieneman. Israëls traveled to Düsseldorf in 1850 before returning to Paris in 1853; there he became acquainted with and drew inspiration from the work of Barbizon School painters. During that time, he made small portraits and genre paintings, while also drawing influence from Romantic poetry and historical subjects.

Israëls received an unfavorable response to his historical painting William of Orange in Council with Regent Margaret of Parma. The work portrays a scene from the life of Dutch King William the Silent, a key leader in the 17th-century revolt against Habsburg Spain. At the 1855 Exposition Universelle in Paris, the artist pivoted his focus towards contemporary Dutch themes. He subsequently concentrated on capturing the essence of fishing communities in Holland. From 1855 to 1856, Israëls spent time in the fishing villages of Zandvoort and Katwijk, where he observed the Dutch fishermen and their families. Passing Mother's Grave was completed in 1856; the art historian Dieuwertje Dekkers has written that the painting "introduced into Dutch art a powerful variant of French Realism".

== Analysis ==
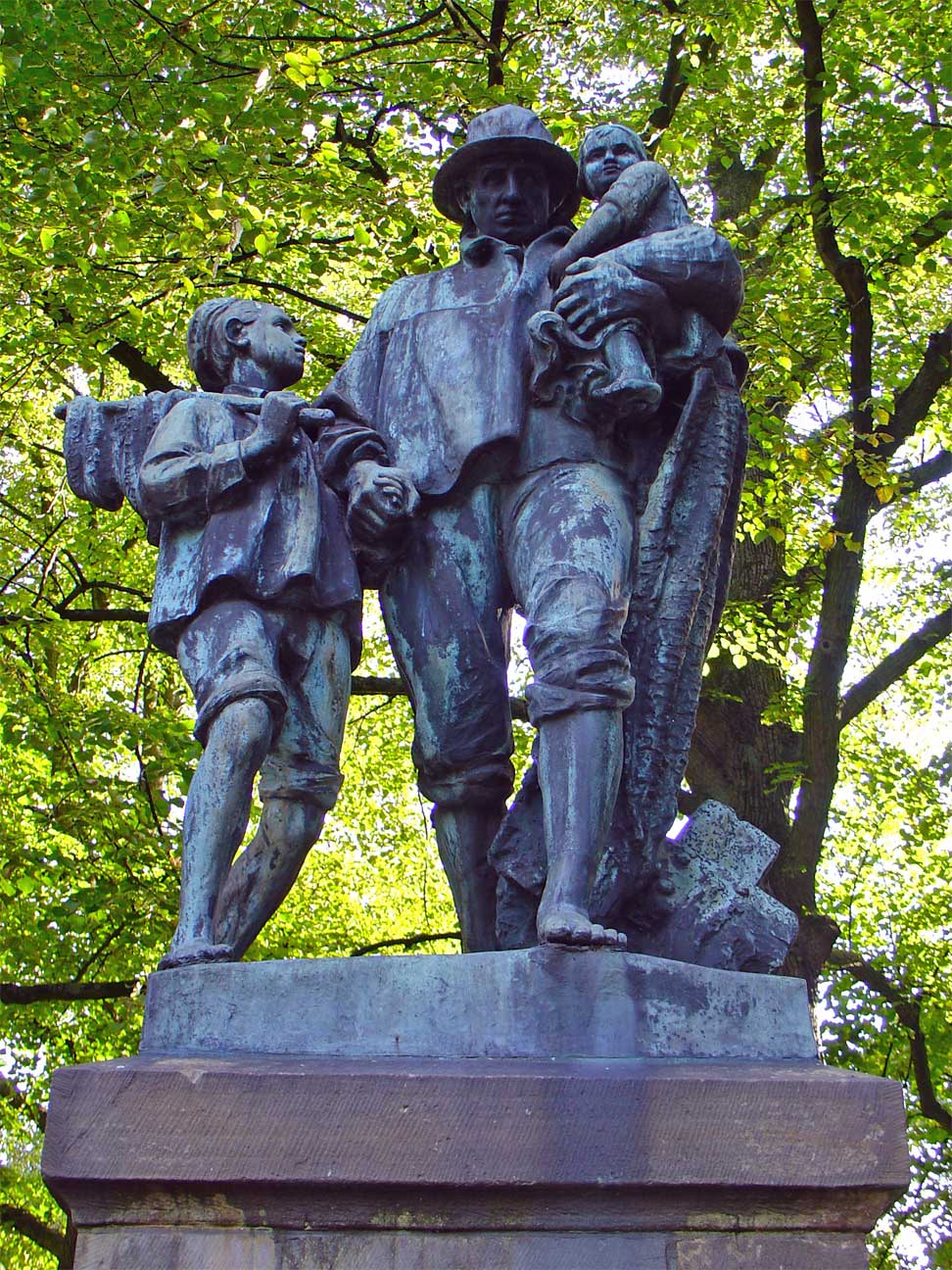
Detail from the Jozef Israëls Monument

Israëls completed multiple versions of the painting. A well-known example in the collection of the Stedelijk Museum Amsterdam is an oil-on-canvas painting with dimensions of 274.5 cm (108.1 in) x 207.5 cm (81.7 in). The three people in the image are all barefoot. The widower is portrayed as a fisherman and he is holding a boy's hand and carrying a baby as he passes the headstone of his deceased wife. The painting was an attempt by Israëls to move from his traditional subject matter of historical paintings toward portrayals of contemporary peasant life.

Austrian art historian Fritz Novotny described the painting as "an almost monochrome grey-brown tonality of a fragile delicacy". The sky in the painting is dark and ominous, but there is a sliver of blue sky which is thought to represent hope. The Rijksbureau voor Kunsthistorische Documentatie stated that the models which Israëls used for the image were Klaas Helweg and the two children of Hendrik Helweg. The writer Nicolaas Beets is credited with naming the image "Passing Mother's Grave" in 1861. In the 1980 book Mondriaan and the Hague School, the painting is referred to as Passing the Churchyard. The original 1856 painting was purchased by the Amsterdam Academy of Fine Arts.

== Reception ==
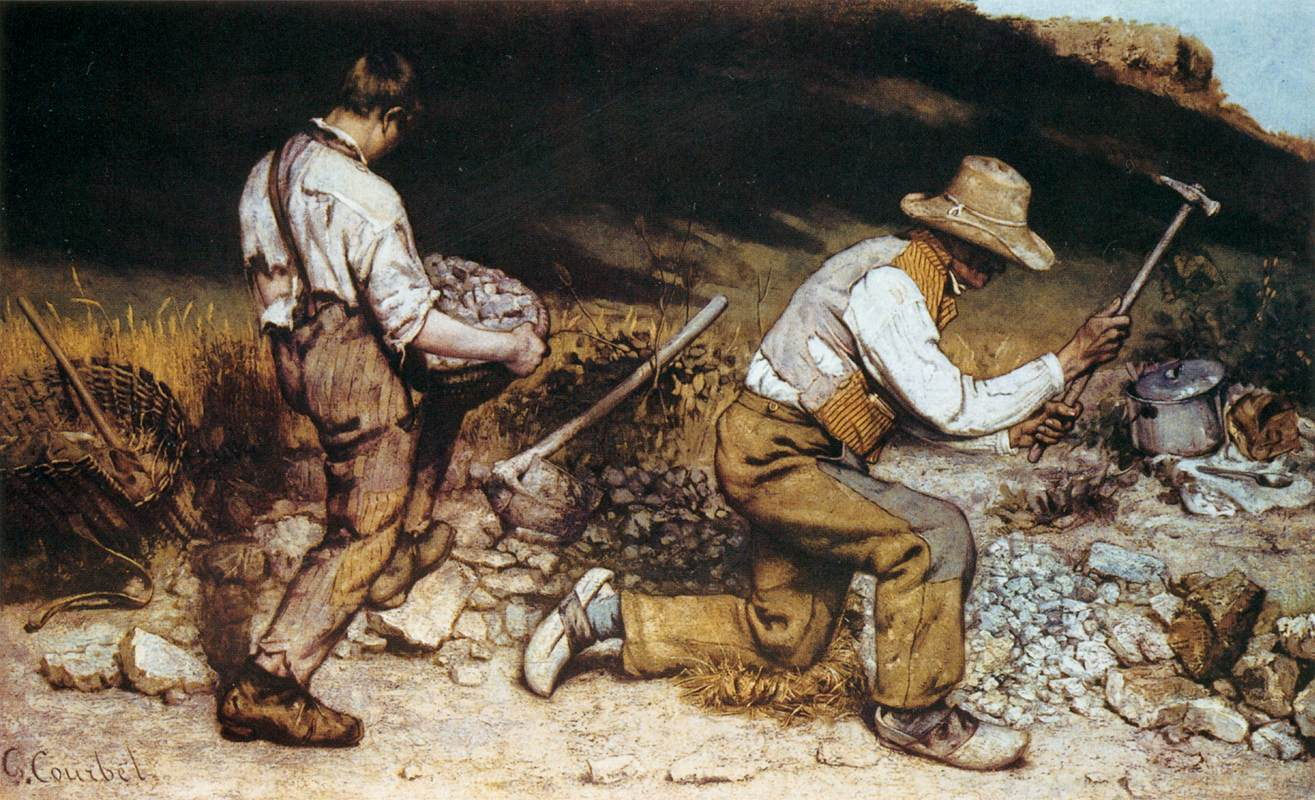
Gustave Courbet, The Stonebreakers, oil on canvas, 1849

The painting is considered to be a milestone for 19th-century realism in the Netherlands. The art historian Sheila D. Muller has written that the artist accomplishes a "monumental treatment of the commonplace" and compared its impact with that of The Stone Breakers, an 1849 painting by the French realist painter Gustave Courbet. The Israeli newspaper Haaretz stated, "The works that came out of the Zandvoort experience are dark, somber and filled with feeling and compassion".

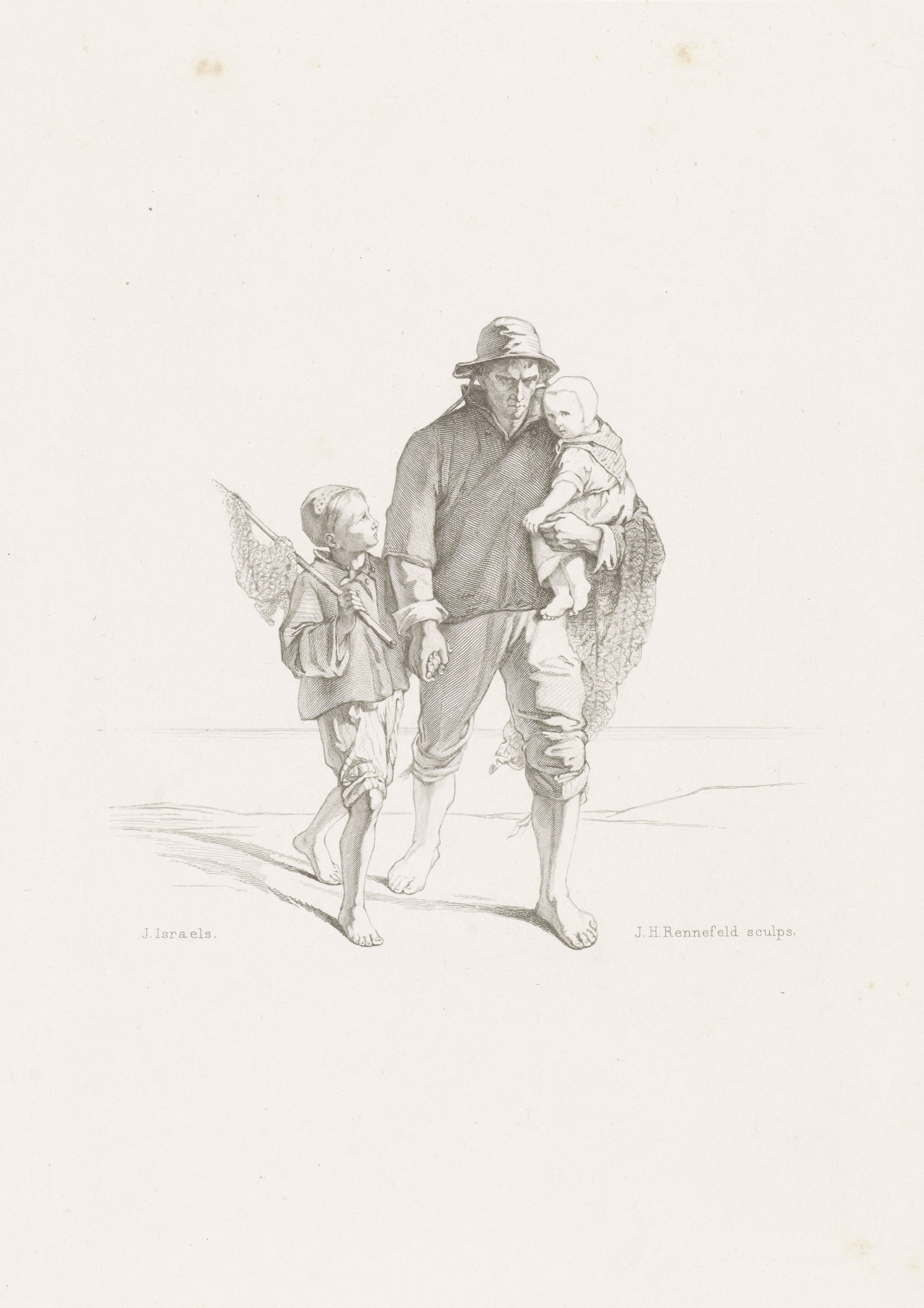
Johann Heinrich Maria Hubert Rennefeld, a print from The Children of the Sea after the painting by Jozef Israëls (1861–1872)

The art historian H.E. van Gelder called the painting a "genuinely new moment and the obvious beginning of the second period of Israëls's development", in which he moved away from his previous interests in German Romanticism and his work emulating the Renaissance and Baroque masters. The painting gained popularity and was widely reproduced in print. For instance, artists Johannes Heinrich Rennefeld and Willem Steelink Jr. made prints of the painting on three separate occasions, which were then published and distributed both in and beyond the Netherlands. While the work is generally considered among the most prominent and recognized paintings by Israëls, it has also met with criticism, particularly in regard to what some have seen as an overtly sentimental subject matter. Writing for Scribner's Magazine in 1912, Byron P. Stephenson, who also worked as an art critic for the New York Evening Post, noted that while some people considered the work to be "one of Israëls's finest works", he thought the sentiment of the painting "cheap and mawkish".

Due to the work's popularity, the subject of Passing Mother's Grave has also inspired the design of a statue in honor of Israëls—The Jozef Israëls Monument—in his hometown of Groningen, which depicts the figures from this painting cast in bronze. The Dutch painter Vincent van Gogh counted the painting among his favorites. He was fascinated by the painting and compared it with the work of French painter Eugène Delacroix, saying the painting was "Delacroix-like and superb" in its technique".

The best-known version of the painting is in the collection of the Stedelijk Museum Amsterdam. Another version of the painting is owned by The New Art Gallery Walsall in Walsall, England; at least one other version is known, sold to a private buyer in Vienna in 1907. The Stedelijk version of the painting is dated 1857. The version in the Walsall's collection is dated 1854 and titled The Widower (The Fisherman's Return). In 2008 another copy of the painting, titled Passing Mother's Tomb, sold at Lempertz auction house in Cologne, Germany. The painting was listed as measuring 94 cm (37 in) x 71.5 cm (28.1 in) and realized a sale price of €19,200.
