= Hessel (surname) =

Hessel is a surname. Notable people with the surname include:

- Bernd Hessel (born 1961), West German sprint canoeist
- Franz Hessel (1880–1941), German author, translator and lecturer
- Katja Hessel (born 1972), German politician
- Lasse Hessel (1940–2019), Danish doctor and inventor
- Johann F. C. Hessel (1796–1872), German physician and mineralogist
- Mats Hessel (born 1961), Swedish ice hockey player
- Phoebe Hessel (1713–1812), woman who disguised herself as a man in order to serve in the British Army
- Stéphane Hessel (1917–2013), French Resistance fighter, diplomat, and writer

== See also ==
- Hessel, a river in Germany
