= Eric Hessels =

Canadian physicist

Eric A. Hessels is a Canadian physicist, currently a Canada Research Chair and Distinguished Research Professor at York University in Toronto, Ontario. In September 2019, Hessels et al. measured the Lamb shift for hydrogen to measure the radius of a proton and demonstrated that it is consistent with the value obtained for muonic hydrogen. This proved that the supposed discrepancy known as the proton radius puzzle did not exist.
