= Lambertus Hesselink =

Electrical engineer

- Education: Caltech
- Scientific career
- Fields: nanophotonics, Ultra Density Optical data storage, nonlinear optics, optical super-resolution, materials science, three-dimensional image processing and graphics, and Internet technologies

Lambertus Hesselink is a Professor in the Stanford Department of Electrical Engineering. He was the Director of the Ginzton Lab from 2008 until 2014. His research includes nano-photonics, ultra high density optical data storage, nonlinear optics, optical super-resolution, materials science, three-dimensional image processing and graphics, and Internet technologies.

== Education and academic career ==
Hesselink earned bachelor's degrees in both mechanical engineering and applied physics from Twente Institute of Technology. He was a Fulbright scholar at California Institute of Technology completing his PhD in 1977.

Hesselink taught applied physics at Caltech, until he joined Stanford University in 1980.

Lambertus Hesselink is currently associated with 19 courses at Stanford University

During his time at Stanford, Hesselink has been involved with founding two companies: Siros Technologies (1994) and Senvid (1999).

== Research ==
As of 2020, Lambertus Hesselink's research group focuses on fundamental processes related to light–matter interaction with novel applications in nanotechnology, bio-engineering, 3-D imaging, information technology and energy conversion devices.

Professor Lambertus Hesselink has been issued approximately 60 patents as of this publication (2020). In the late 1980s, Hesselink was a member of the conceptual and design team that created the Space Mirror, an astronaut memorial at Kennedy Space Center. He designed the optical and tracking systems, which rotates the structure, reflecting sunlight to illuminate names of astronauts who perished in the line of duty. Currently, the monument uses floodlights, instead of the original concept.

== Awards and honors ==
- 1996 Corresponding member of the Royal Netherlands Academy of Arts and Sciences
- 1990 Elected Fellow, Optical Society of America
- 2004 Fellow SPIE
- 2013 NSF selection as being in top 1% of all US inventors
