= Martijn Hesselink =

Dutch legal academic

Hesselink, Martijn W. is a Dutch legal scholar. He works in the area of European private law and legal theory. In 2019, he became a professor at the European University Institute.

== Education ==
Hesselink studied law, obtaining degrees from the University of Amsterdam and the Paris-Panthéon-Assas University (1992) and a doctorate in laws from Utrecht University (1999).

== Career ==
In 1999, he joined the University of Amsterdam, initially as a professor of private law, but from 2006 onwards as chair of European Private Law. Upon joining the European University Institute in 2019, Hesselink became Professor of Transnational Law and Theory, directing his research towards normative and critical approaches to European Union law.

As of 2024, Google Scholar includes over 2600 citations of his work, and his book Justifying Contract in Europe was the subject of a special issue of the Netherlands Journal of Legal Philosophy and reviewed in the European Review of Private Law.

Outside academia, Hesselink has been an honorary justice at the Court of Appeal of Amsterdam, a member of the European Commission's expert group on European contract law, and consulted with the European Parliament.

== Selected publications ==
- Hartkamp, Arthur S., Hesselink, Martijn W., Hondius, Ewoud, Mak, Chantal, Du Perron, Edgar. Towards a European Civil Code (4th edition, Wolters Kluwer 2010).
- Hesselink, Martijn W., Justifying Contract in Europe: Political Philosophies of European Contract Law (Oxford University Press, 2021).
- Hesselink, Martijn W., ‘The Politics of a European Civil Code’ (2004) 10(6) European Law Journal 675.
- Hesselink, Martijn W., ‘A European legal method? On European private law and scientific method’ (2009) 15(1) European Law Journal 20.
- Cartwright, John and Hesselink, Martijn W. (eds), Precontractual Liability in European Private Law (Cambridge University Press, 2009).
