= Abraham Hesselink =

Dutch sculptor

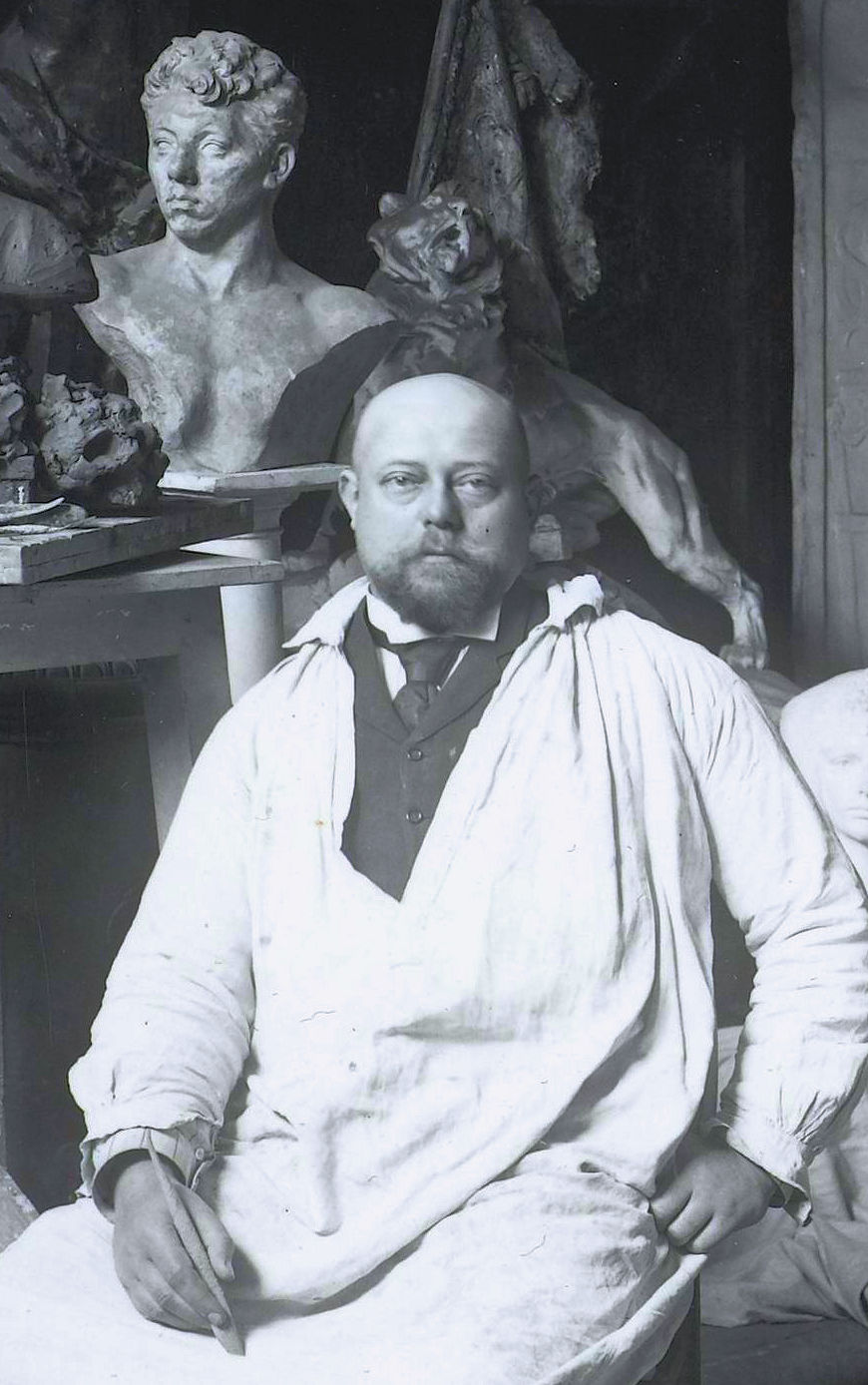
- Abraham Hesselink in his studio (1903)
- Born: July 19, 1862; Paterswolde, the Netherlands
- Died: October 18, 1930 (aged 68)
- Education: Academy of Amsterdam
- Known for: Sculpture
- Notable work: Jozef Israëls Monument

Abraham Hesselink (July 19, 1862 to October 18, 1930) was a Dutch artist from Paterswolde in the Netherlands. His works were exhibited at the Salon (Paris) and the 1904 World’s Fair. He earned a gold medal at the 1904 World's Fair.

== Early life ==
Abraham Hesselink was born in the village of Paterswolde near Groningen. He was born on July 19, 1862. He studied at the Academy of Amsterdam and in Brussels under sculptor Charles van der Stappen.

== Career ==
He created a sculpture called Struggle of the Titans: the sculpture is now in the collection of the Ryksmuseum in Amsterdam. He exhibited the sculpture at the 1891 Salon (Paris) and received an honorable mention. The artist loaned the sculpture to the Ryksmuseum in 1896.

He earned a gold medal at the 1904 World's Fair for his work titled Arab Woman.

After the death of Jozef Israëls The Groningen Association of Art Lovers Pictura commissioned a Jozef Israëls Monument to honor him. The sculpture was made by Hesselink and unveiled in 1922. It was placed in Groningen which was the birthplace of artist Jozef Israëls.

== Gallery ==
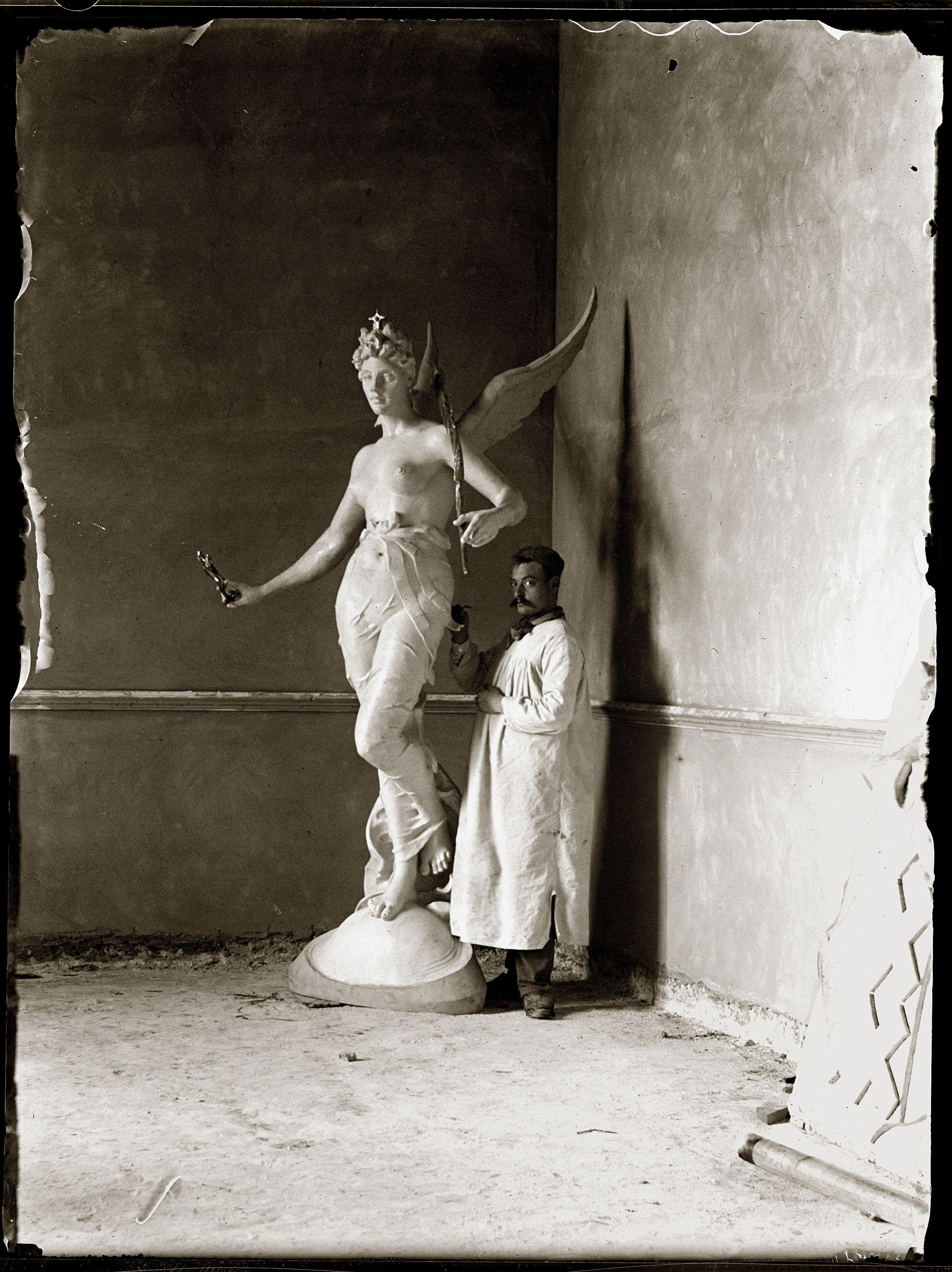
Hesselink met 'De Faam', zijn beeld voor de top van het Museum Suasso. Foto uit 1894 van Jacob Olie.

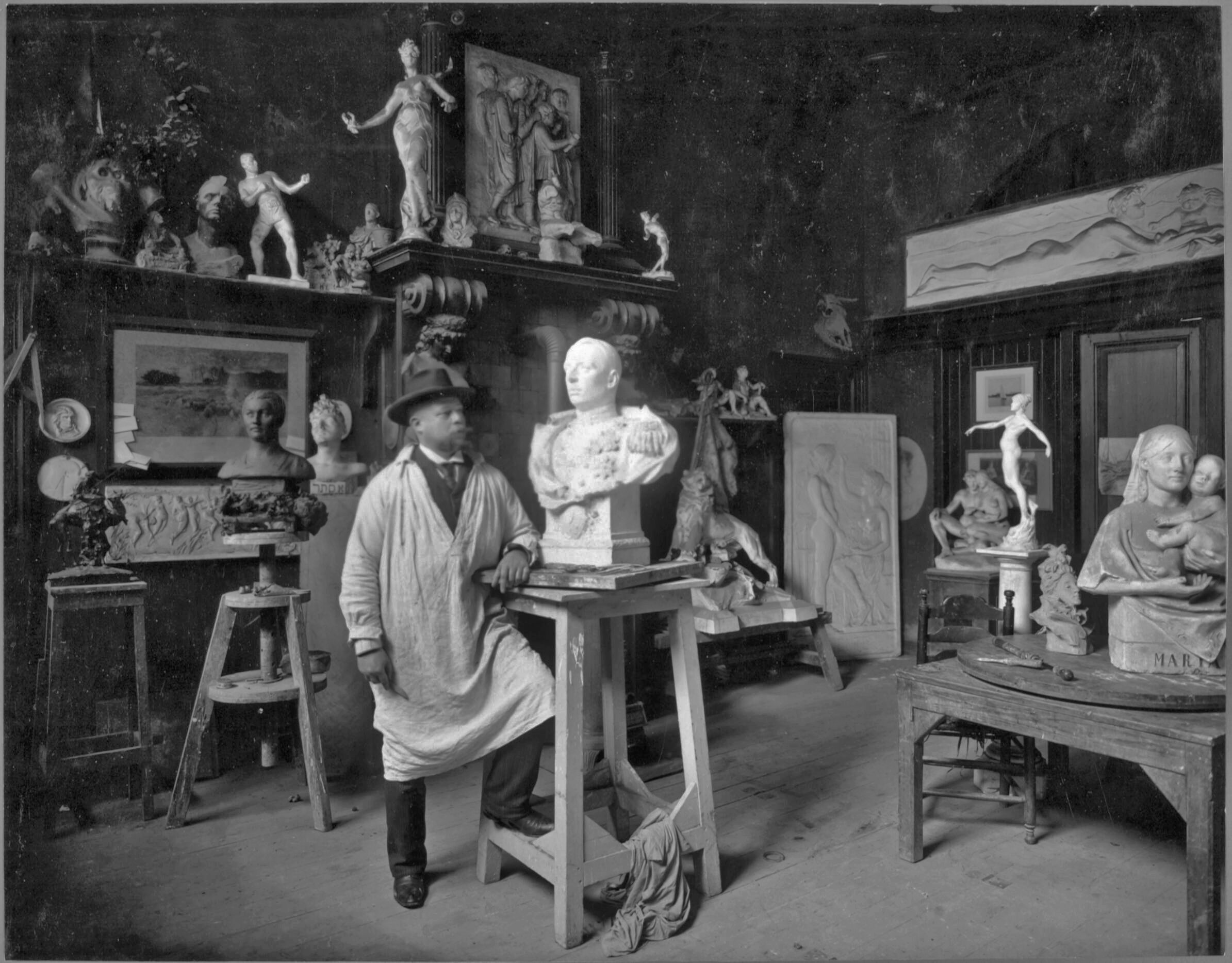
Hesselink in zijn atelier (1903), foto van Sigmund Löw.

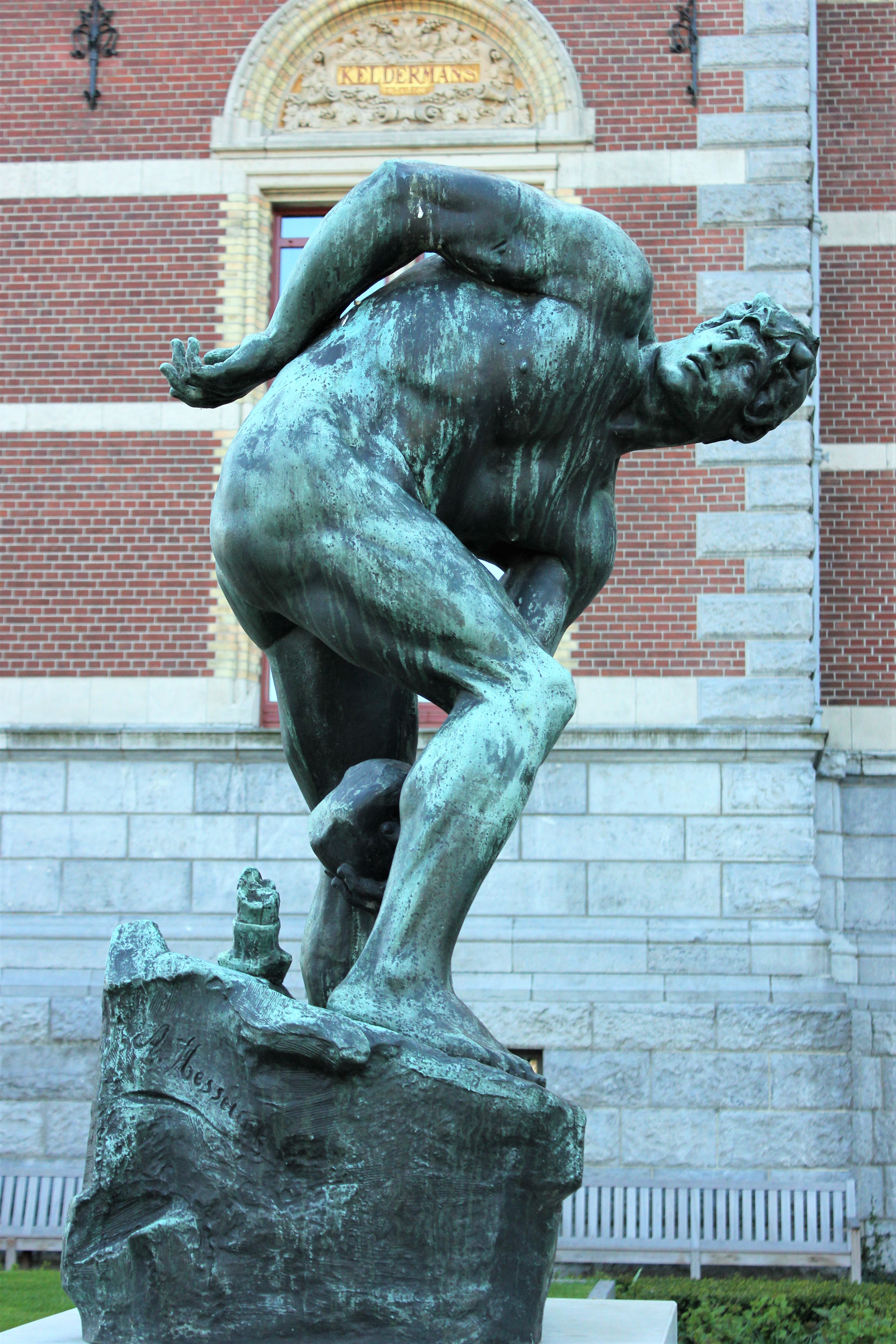
Titanenstrijd (1891), tuin Rijksmuseum, Amsterdam

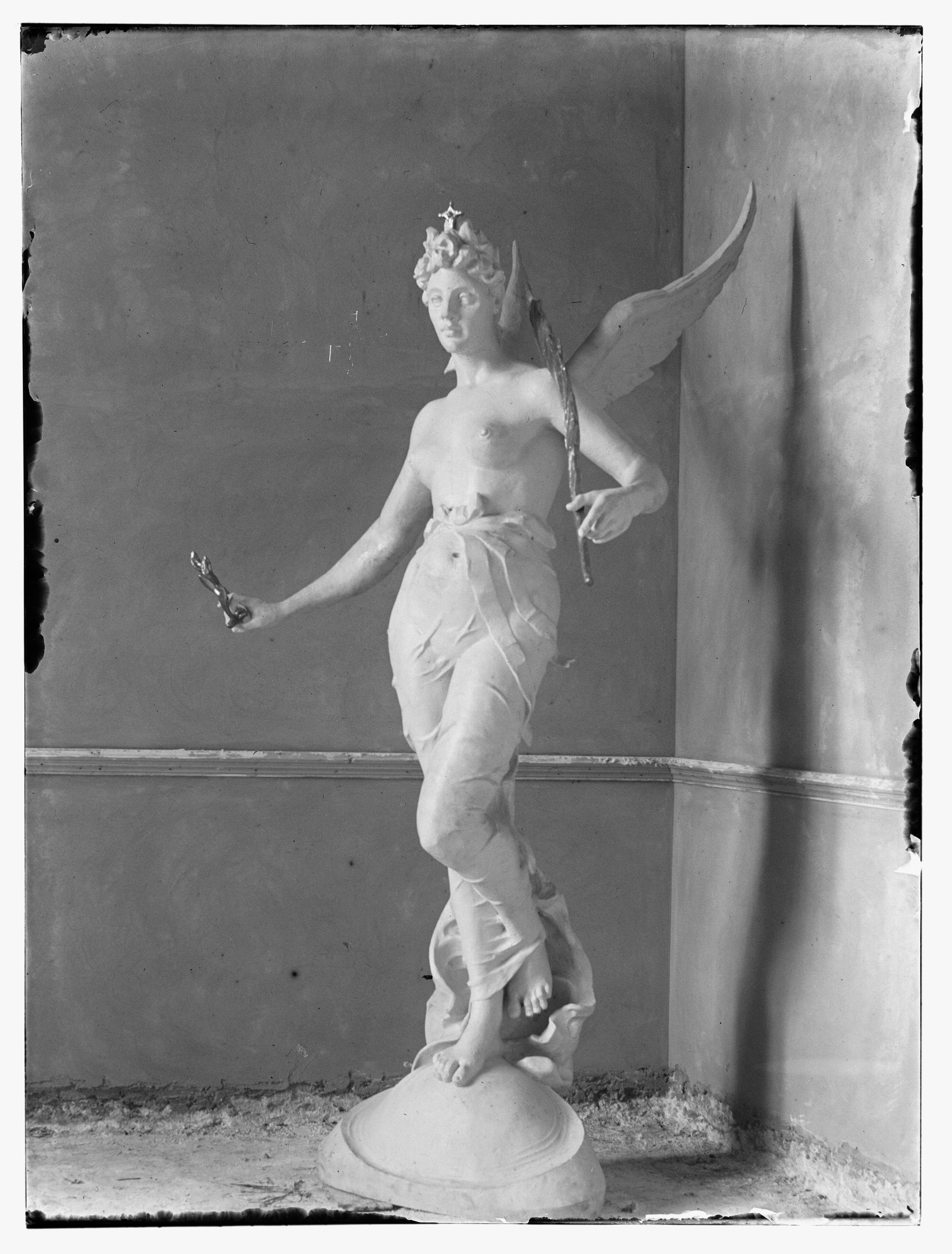
De Faam (1894), Stedelijk Museum, Amsterdam

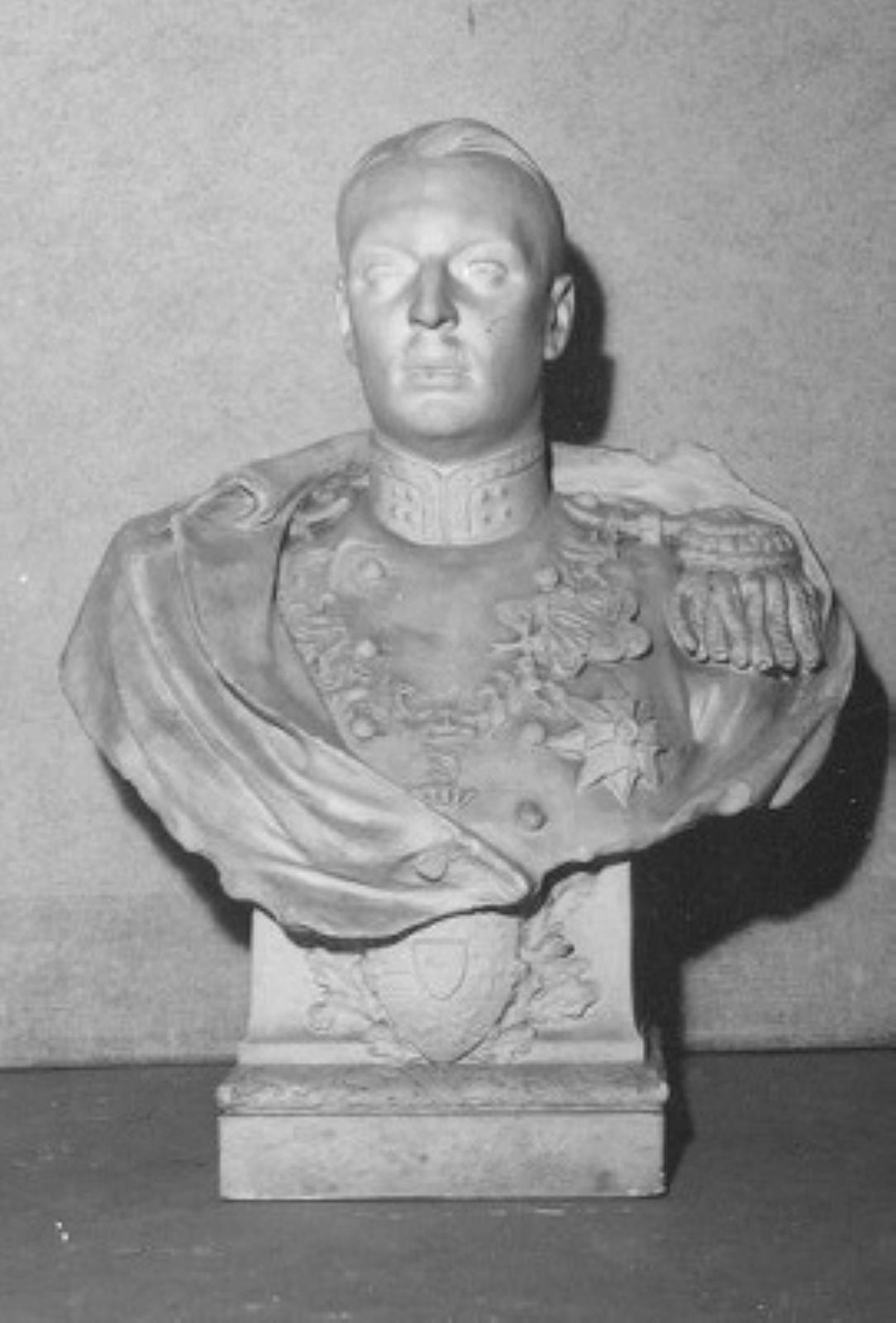
Gipsen buste prins Hendrik (1901), Amsterdam Museum

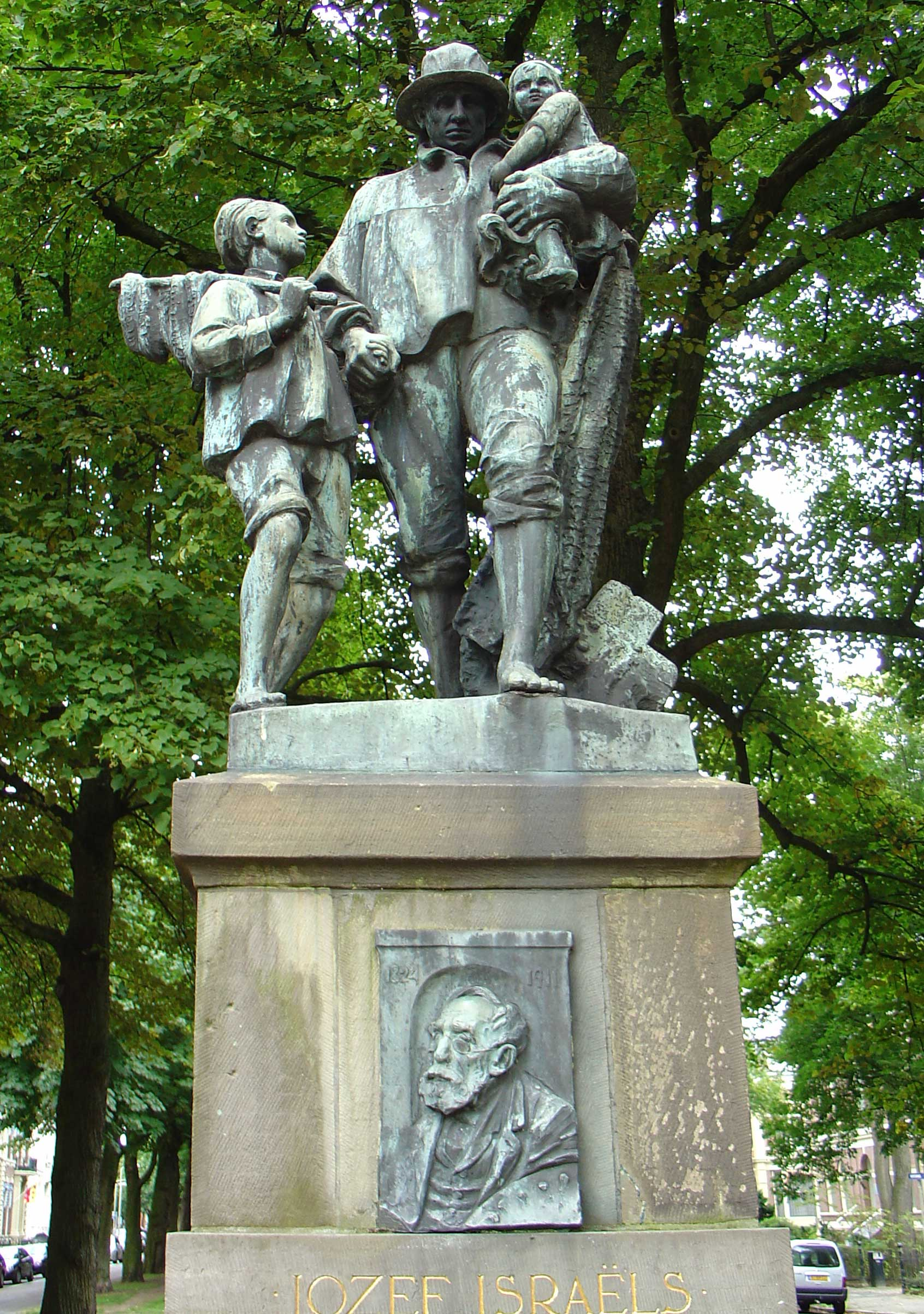
Jozef Israëls Monument (1916), Groningen

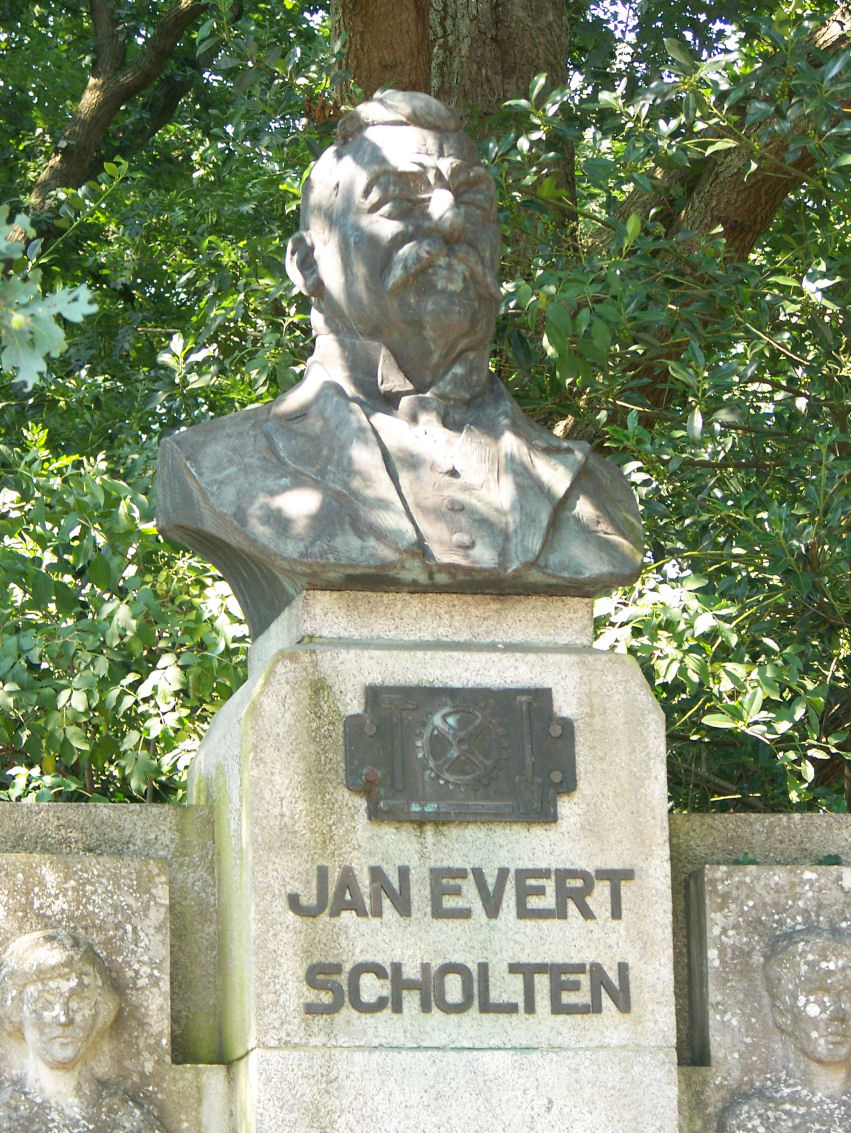
Monument Jan Evert Scholten (1931), Groningen

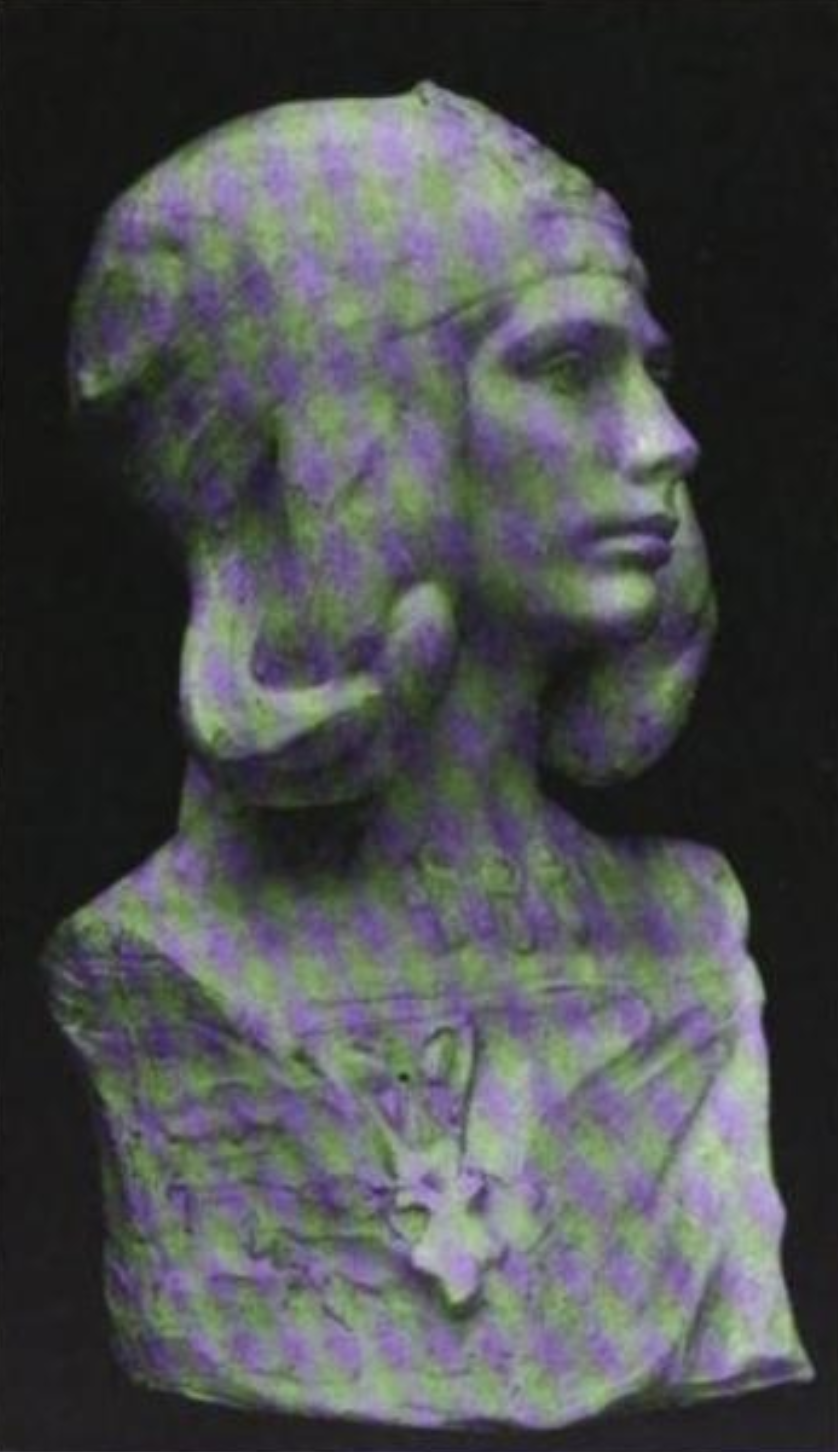
904 Arabian Woman by Abraham Hesselink

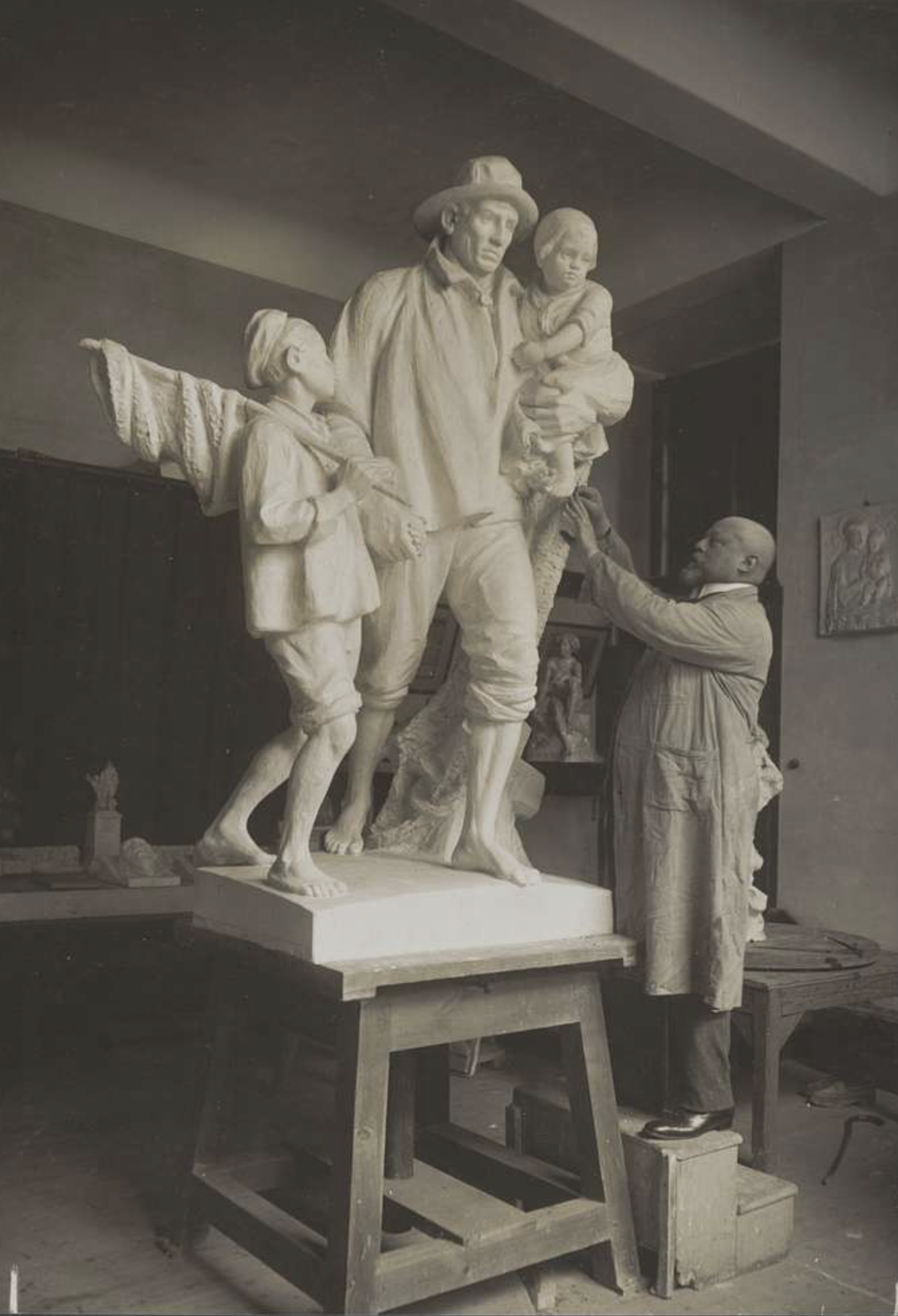
1917 Abraham Hesselink working on the Jozef Israëls Monument
