= Sara Trobäck =

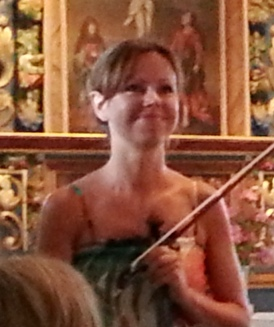
- Trobäck in 2014

Background information
- Born: Sara Katarina Trobäck Hesselink; 1978 (age 47–48)
- Origin: Sweden
- Occupation: Violinist
- Instrument: Violin
- Member of: Gothenburg Symphony Orchestra

Sara Katarina Trobäck Hesselink (born 1978) is a Swedish violinist. Since 2002, she has been first concertmaster of the Gothenburg Symphony Orchestra.

== Career ==
Born in 1978 in Örebro in central Sweden, Trobäck began to play the violin when she was five. She was first taught by Sten-Göran Thorell, then when she was 12 years old, by Tibor Fülep. In 1994, when she was 16, she entered the Gothenburg College of Music, while from 1996 to 2001 she studied under György Pauk at the Royal Academy of Music in London. She also attended master classes with Yehudi Menuhin, Maxim Vengerov, Dmitry Sitkovetsky, Ruggiero Ricci, Cho-Liang Lin and Joshua Bell.

While still young, she performed as a soloist throughout Sweden, making her London debut in 1999 with the London Soloists Chamber Orchestra at St. Martin-in-the-Fields, where she played Tchaikovsky's Violin Concerto. She has also performed with the Swedish Chamber Orchestra, Helsingborg Symphony Orchestra and the Musica Vitae chamber orchestra. She has twice taken part in the SummerFest concerts for young artists in La Jolla, California (2002 and 2003), and has performed widely throughout Europe. She is also a co-founder of Trio Poseidon which was established in 2002.

In 2002, Trobäck was appointed leader of the Gothenburg Symphony Orchestra. She is the first woman to have reached this position. She plays a Guadagnini from 1753, on loan from the Järnåker Foundation.

== Discography ==
- Kurt Atterberg: Suite No. 3 for violin, viola and string orchestra . Sara Trobäck Hesselink, violin, Per Högberg, viola, Gothenburg Symphony Orchestra, conductor Neeme Järvi. Chandos CHSA 5116, 2013
- Kurt Atterberg: Suite No. 3 for violin, viola and string orchestra. Sara Trobäck, violin, Johanna Persson, viola, Svenska Kammarorkestern, conductor Petter Sundkvist. Naxos 8.553715, 1996
- Beethoven: Concert for Piano, Violin, Cello and Orchestra, Op. 56, Brahms: Concerto for Violin, Cello and Orchestra, Op. 102. Sara Trobäck Hesselink, violin, Claes Gunnarsson, cello, Per Lundberg, piano, Gothenburg Symphony Orchestra, conductor Neeme Järvi. Chandos CHAN 10564, 2010
