= Alte Hessel =

River in Germany

Coordinates: 52°00′N 8°07′E

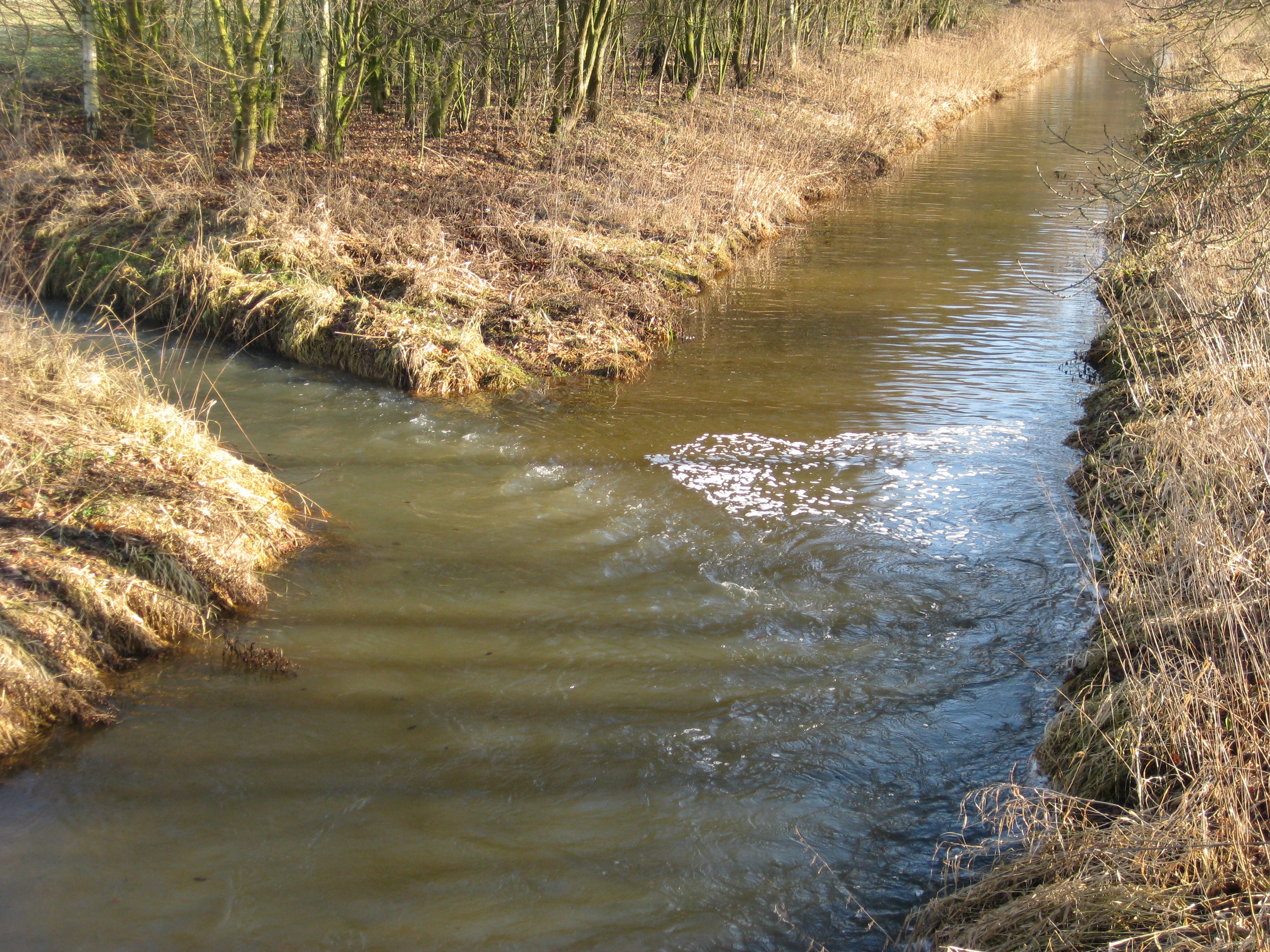
- Mouth of the Neue Hessel into the Alte Hessel in nature reserve Versmolder Bruch near Versmold

- Location of mouth in North Rhine-Westphalia

Location
- Country: Germany
- State: North Rhine-Westphalia

Alte Hessel is a river of North Rhine-Westphalia, Germany. It is a branch of the river Hessel.

== See also ==
- List of rivers of North Rhine-Westphalia
