= The Gleaners (Jules Breton) =

1854 Jules Breton painting of peasants at work

- Les glaneurs (French)
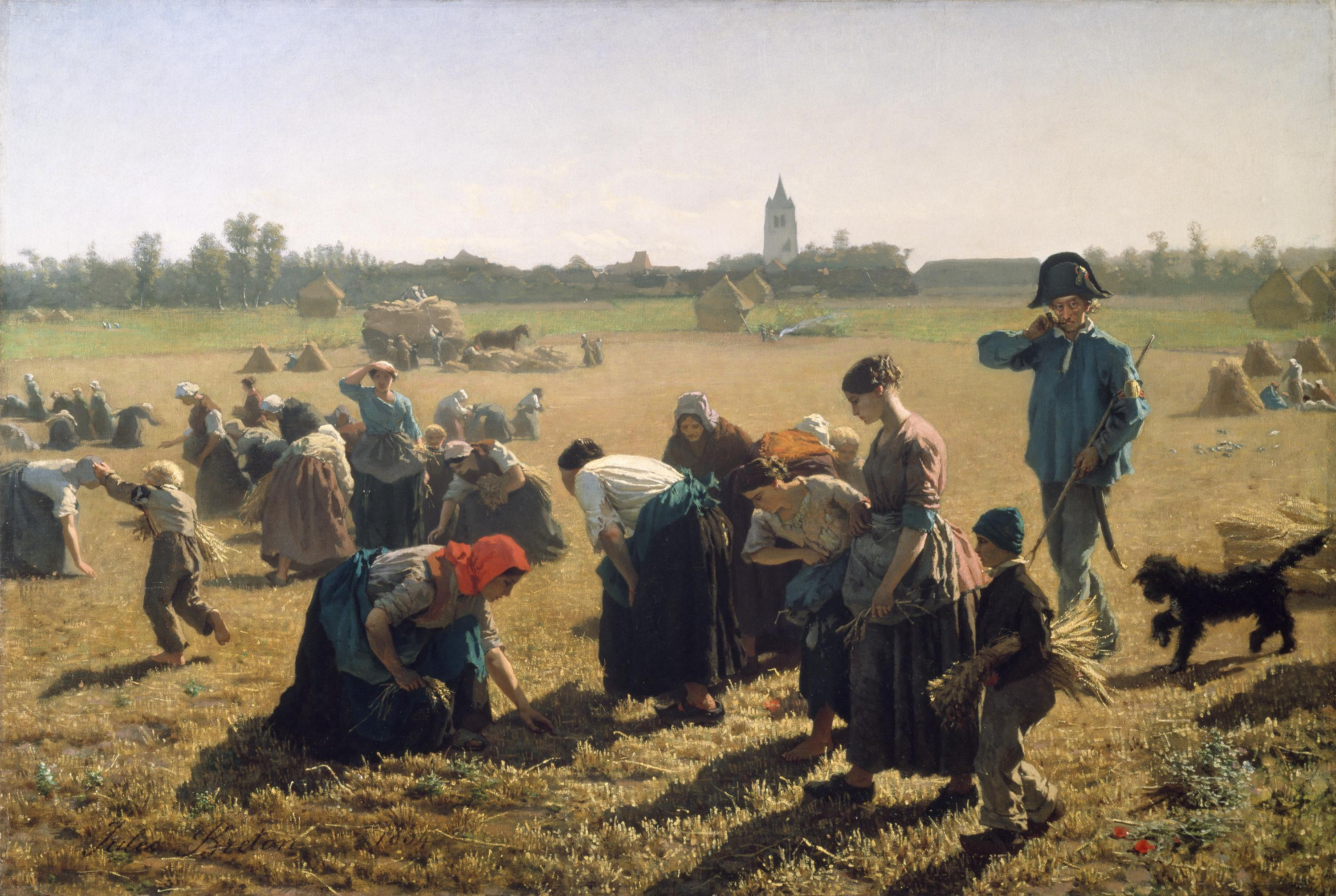
- The Gleaners
- Artist: Jules Breton
- Year: 1854
- Medium: oil-on-canvas
- Subject: Peasants
- Dimensions: 93 cm × 138 cm (37 in × 54 in)
- Location: National Gallery of Ireland, Dublin

The Gleaners (French: Les Glaneurs) is an oil-on-canvas painting by Jules Breton, from 1854. The painting depicts an idealized version of peasant life. It is held in the National Gallery of Ireland, in Dublin.

== History ==
Breton exhibited The Gleaners at the Salon of 1855 in Paris. It was praised by critics and a private collector purchased it.

== Description and analysis ==
In the painting women and children are seen gathering wheat. Breton was inspired by the realist paintings of Gustave Courbet. Breton portrayed the poor often in idealized settings while Courbet's paintings were darker and less romanticized. In this case, Breton included a village policeman, who supervises the women and children who are gathering wheat, since men were not allowed. In the background, men can be seen loading wheat onto wagons. The painting is bathed in warm light and shadows which suggests that the work day is coming to an end. Nearly all of the subjects in the painting appear to be working for the same goal. Part of the painting appears on the cover of the book, Jules Breton: Painter of Peasant Life.
