= Hessel (given name) =

Hessel is a Dutch male given name. People named Hessel include:

- Hessel Gerritsz (c.1581–1632), Dutch engraver, cartographer and publisher
- Hessel Hermana (died c.876), 3rd Magistrate governor of Frisia
- Hessel van der Kooi (born 1950), Dutch pop singer
- Hessel Martena (died 1312), 10th Magistrate governor of Frisia
- Hessel Miedema (1929–2019), Dutch art historian
- Hessel Oosterbeek (born 1959), Dutch economist
- Hessel Rienks (1932–2014), Dutch Labour Party politician
- Hessel de Vries (1916–1959), Dutch physicist
