= Hessel (singer) =

Dutch singer

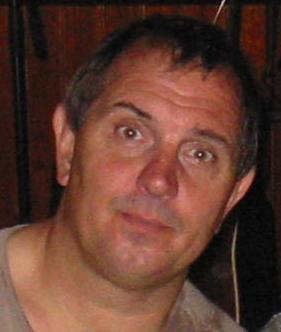
- Hessel in 2003

Background information
- Born: Hessel van der Kooij; 20 April 1955 (age 70); West-Terschelling, Netherlands
- Genres: rock, blues
- Occupations: Singer/songwriter, musician

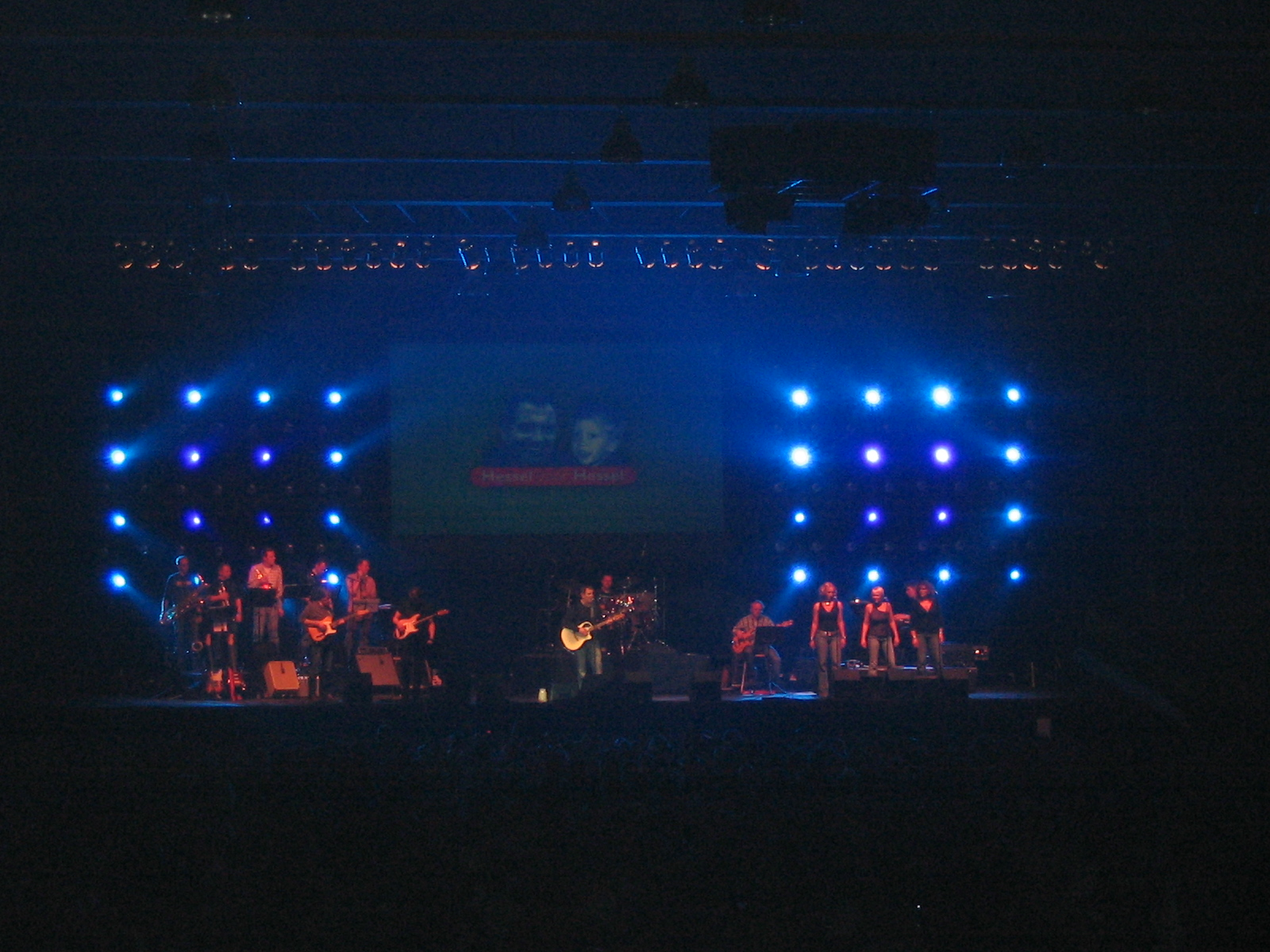
Hessel in concert, 2005

Hessel van der Kooij (20 April 1955 in West-Terschelling) is a popular Dutch singer. He is best known as Hessel, but has also recorded as Ray Maccannon. The favourite theme in his songs is about his home-island Terschelling and the nature on and around it. His repertoire is jazz- & bluesrock like "teruk naar terschelling" and rockballads like "brother sagittarius", "twothousand birds" and "no borders bound for birds" from the Albums "Flamborough Head" and "Me", which reaches international niveau. He stopped to perform his songs in November 2022 in his Cafe "de groene weide" in Hoorn, Terschelling.

== Discography ==
=== Albums ===
- Flamborough Head (1981) (own label)
- Just my Luck (1988)
- Live in Frjentsjer (1989) (livealbum)
- Dust (1990)
- Live Ahoy '91 (1991) (livealbum)
- Me (1994)
- Flotsam (2000)

=== Singles ===
- "Apocalyptic" (1984)
- "Any River You Take" (1990)
- "Brother Sagittarius" (1990)
- "Terug naar Terschelling" (1991)
- "Somebody Told Me" (1991)
- "The World In Perfect State" (1992)
- "Twenty Times a Day" (1994)
- "Law and Order" (1999)
- "One Heart" (2000) (with daughter Tess)
- "Gloeiend Hout" (2014)
