= Bruchbach (Hessel) =

River in North Rhine-Westphalia, Germany

Location
- Country: Germany
- State: North Rhine-Westphalia

Physical characteristics
- Mouth
  - location: Hessel
  - coordinates: 52.0362°N 8.2094°E
- Length: 8.3 km (5.2 mi)
- Basin size: 19.1 km^{2} (7.4 sq mi)

Basin features
- Progression: Hessel→ Ems→ North Sea

Bruchbach is a river of North Rhine-Westphalia, Germany. A right tributary of the Hessel, it flows for 8.3 kilometres and has a basin area of 19.139 km^{2}. It flows into the Hessel in Oesterweg.
