= Hessel =

River in North Rhine-Westphalia, Germany

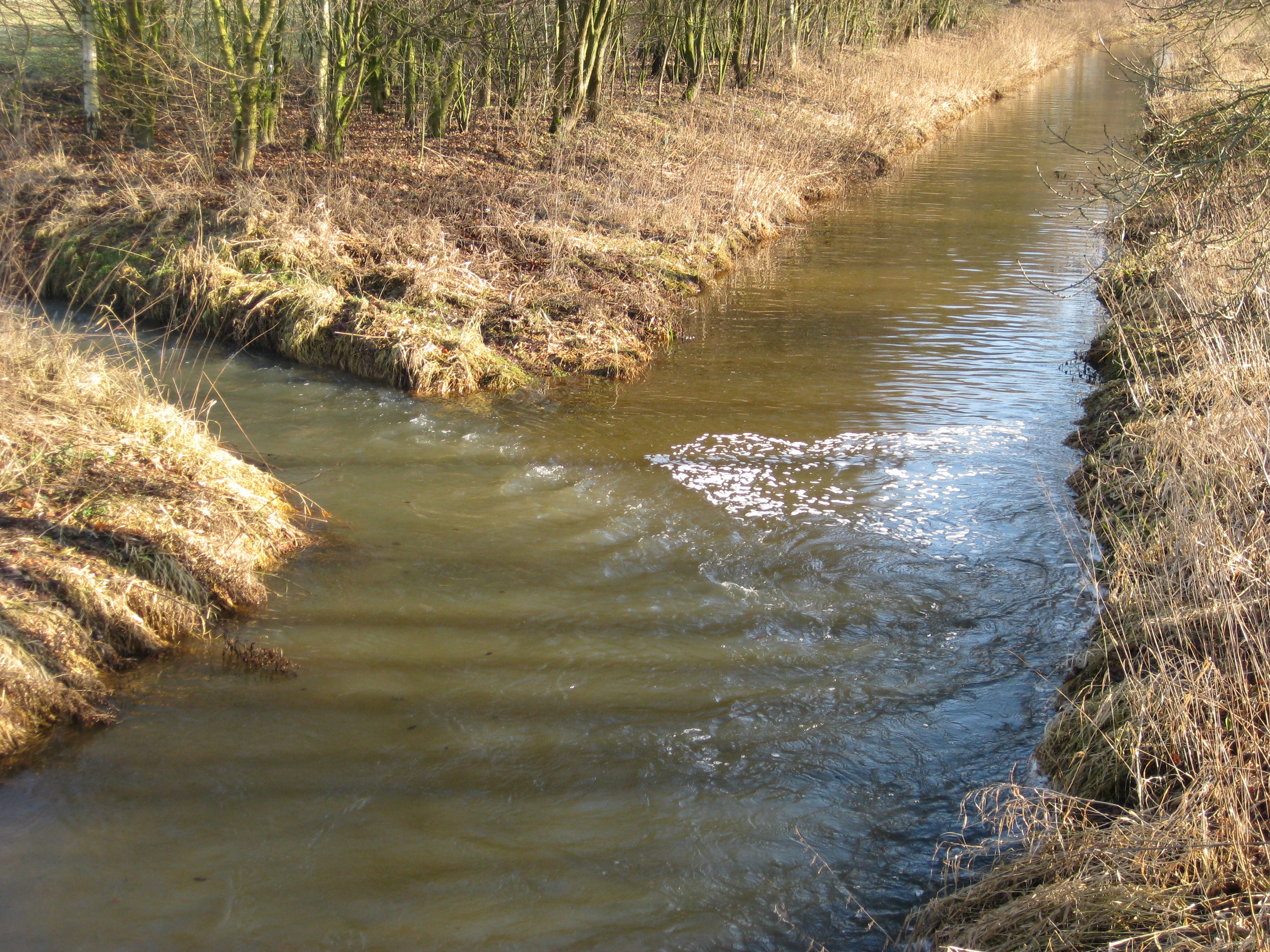
- Confluence of the Neuer Hessel and the Alter Hessel near the nature reserve of Versmolder Bruch

Location
- Country: Germany
- State: North Rhine-Westphalia
- Reference no.: DE: 316

Physical characteristics
- Source
  - location: Source: Northwest of Halle (Westf.) in the Teutoburg Forest
  - coordinates: 52°05′30″N 8°21′02″E
  - elevation: ca. 170 m above sea level (NN)
- Mouth
  - location: Warendorf-Einen
  - coordinates: 51°58′26″N 7°54′59″E
  - elevation: ca. 48 m above sea level (NN)
- Length: 39.337 km
- Basin size: 212.528 km^{2}
- Discharge
  - location: at Milte (4,3 km oberhalb der Mündung, Einzugsgebiet: 204,87 km²) gauge
  - average: 2.12 m³/s
  - minimum: Record low: 0 L/s (in 2005); Average low: 304 L/s
  - maximum: Average high: 18.4 m³/s Record high: 33.6 m³/s (in 1986)

Basin features
- Progression: Ems→ North Sea
- Tributaries
  - left: Alte Hessel, Lüffe Graben,
  - right: Casumer Bach, Bruchbach, Aabach, Poggenfahrtgraben, Sandfortbach, Teichwiese, Wöstenbach, Beckstroth, Arenbecke, Speckengraben

The Hessel is a 39.3-kilometre-long (24.4 mi), right tributary of the River Ems in the territory of the North Rhine-Westphalian districts of Gütersloh and Warendorf in northwest Germany.

The river rises northwest of Halle (Westf.) on the Große Egge, crosses the Hermannsweg, flows through the villages of Hesseln and Hörste in Halle borough, then through the borough of Versmold through Oesterweg, continuing through the town of Sassenberg and along the southern edge of Milte in the borough of Warendorf, before emptying into the Ems near Warendorf-Einen.

Tributaries include the Casumer Bach, Bruchbach, Aabach, Poggenfahrtgraben, Sandfortbach, Teichwiese, Wöstenbach, Beckstroth, Arenbecke and the Speckengraben.

The Snake's Head Meadows lie along the Hessel near Sassenberg, one of the few areas in Germany in which this strictly protected wildflower occurs.
