= Sylvain Kahn =

Alsatian-born co-founder of Hirsch & Cie Amsterdam (1857–1929)

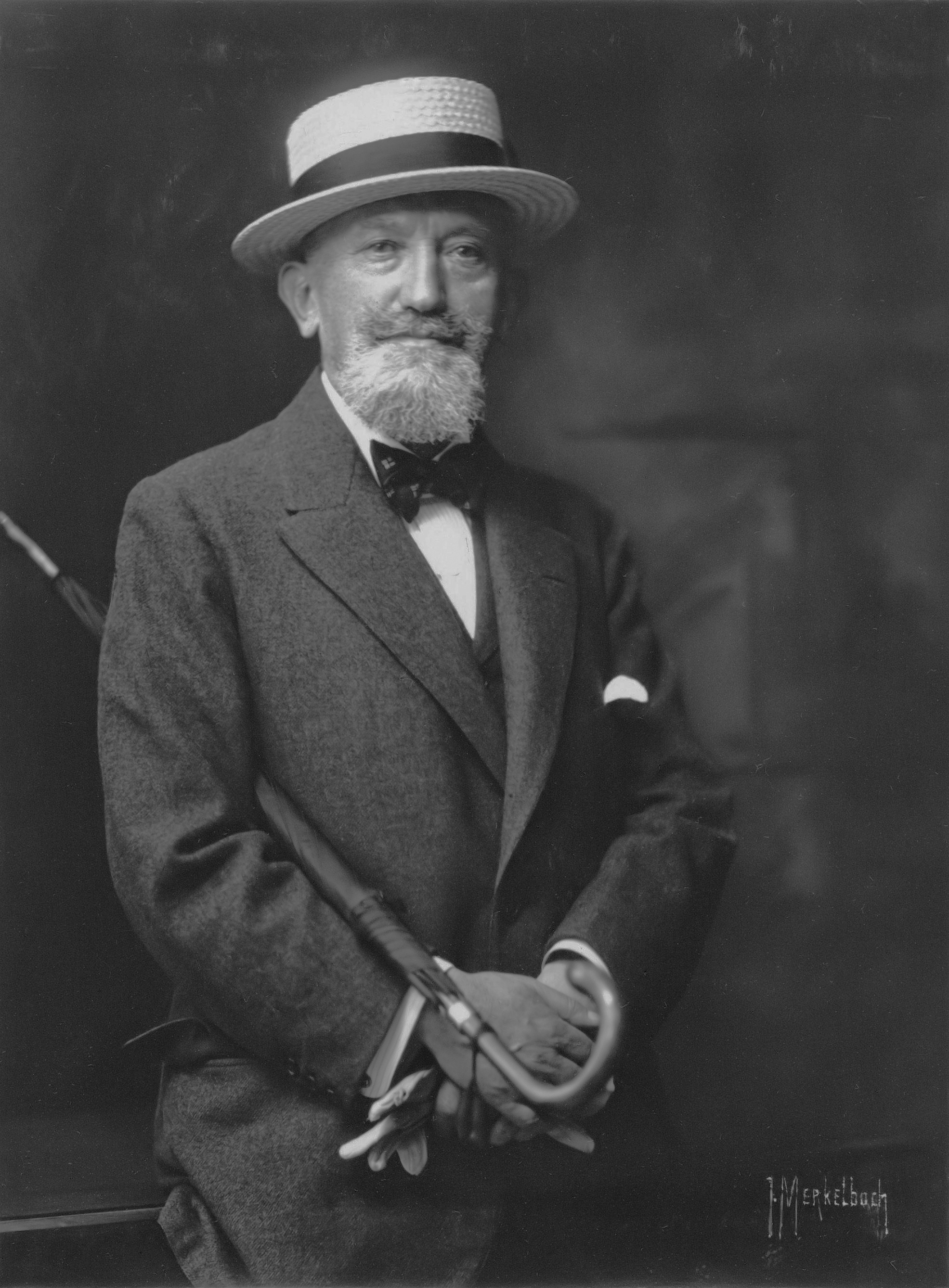
- Kahn in 1916
- Born: 17 July 1857; Schirrhoffen, Alsace, France
- Died: 3 December 1929 (aged 72); Amsterdam, Netherlands
- Resting place: Jewish cemetery, Muiderberg
- Occupation: Businessman
- Known for: Co-founder and director of Hirsch & Cie in Amsterdam
- Spouse: Julie Berg (m. 1885)
- Children: 5, including Bernard Arnold Kahn and Henri René Kahn
- Relatives: Sally Berg (brother-in-law and business partner)

Sylvain Kahn (17 July 1857 – 3 December 1929) was an Alsatian-born Jewish businessman who, with Sally Berg, founded the Amsterdam fashion house Hirsch & Cie on the Leidseplein in 1882. Within the partnership Berg was mainly responsible for the models and Kahn for buying fabrics, especially silk, and for the business side. The two also bought the Vienna fashion house of Drecoll in 1895, and Kahn became general manager of its Paris house in 1902. He remained a director of Hirsch & Cie until his death.

== Early life ==
Kahn was born on 17 July 1857 in Schirrhoffen, in Alsace, into a Jewish family. After the German annexation of Alsace in 1871 he was among the many Alsatians who left the region. He started work at about fourteen as an apprentice at Léo Hirsch's fashion house in Brussels, where he met Sally Berg, a Westphalian apprentice of the same age. (Note: The Netherlands Economic History Archive dates his time at Hirsch in Brussels from 1873 to 1882.) By 1881 he had become head of fabric buying, with silk as his speciality, helped by his contacts with the silk manufacturer Claude-Joseph Bonnet and his mills near Lyon.

== Hirsch & Cie ==
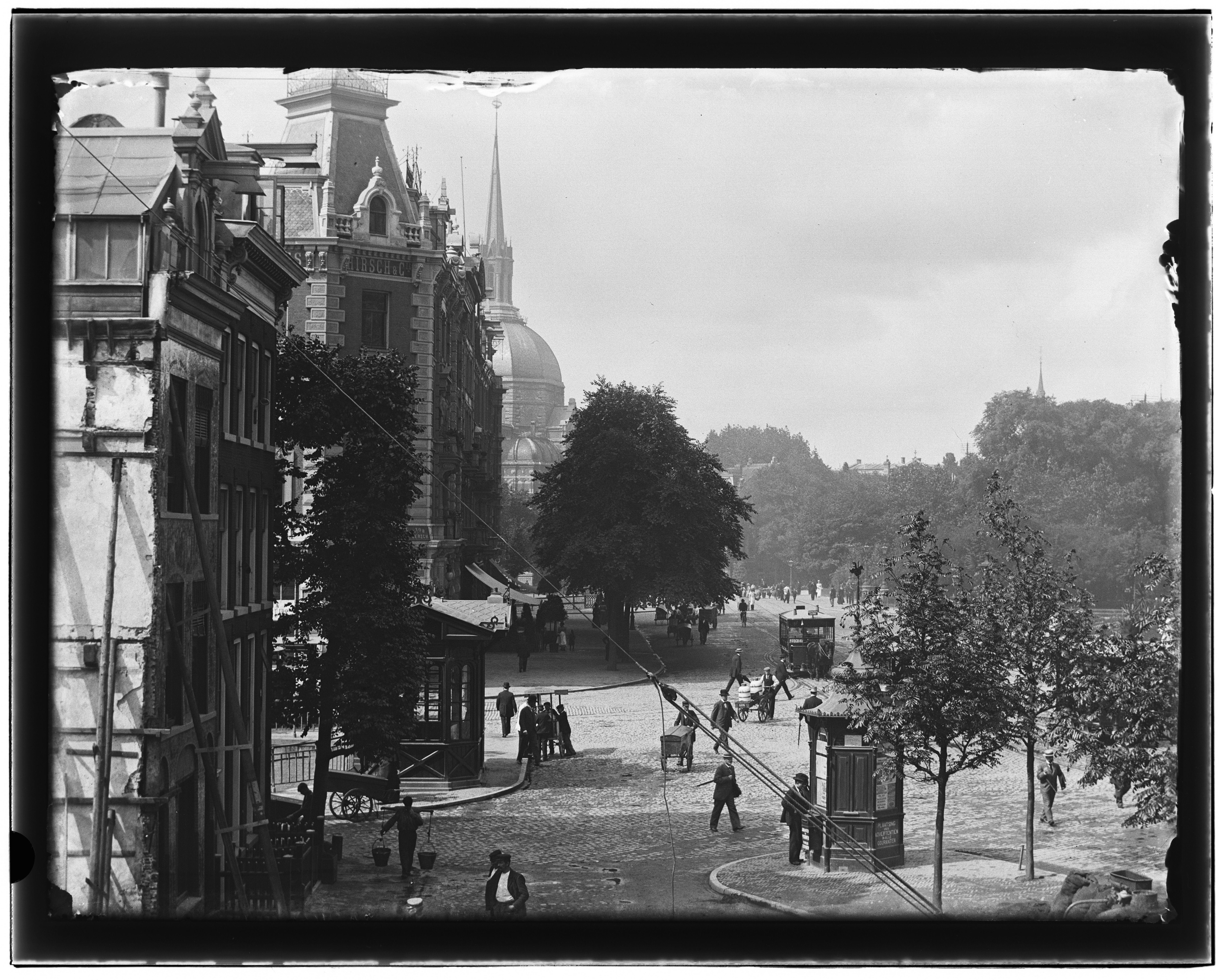
The first Hirsch & Cie premises on the Leidseplein (centre), 1899

In a newspaper interview in 1928, Kahn said that he first came to the Netherlands in April 1882 to sell silks to dressmakers for the Brussels house. He thought the women so badly dressed that he felt he had arrived in China, but his orders were so large that he telegraphed Berg to say that they should open a shop in Amsterdam instead of the wholesale business they had planned. On the last day of his trip he found a building on the Leidseplein that was being fitted out for a piano dealer. People told him the site, then on the edge of the city, was absurd, but he wanted a shop on a square where carriages could wait, as he had seen in Paris. Léo Hirsch provided the start-up capital and the use of his firm's name and business model in return for a share of the profits, and the Amsterdam house opened on 25 September 1882. (Note: Bakker and Huyser also give November 1882 as the opening date in one place.)

Kahn recalled that before the opening a swindler had rented a room on the Singel, put up a sign reading "Provisional office of Hirsch & Cie" and given it as the firm's address to the post office and the shipping agents, intercepting goods worth thirty to forty thousand guilders. Kahn reported him to the police, went that evening to the home of the public prosecutor to obtain a warrant, and the man was arrested and sentenced to seven years in prison. Demand in the first weeks was so great that Kahn brought twenty or thirty seamstresses from Brussels.

According to his obituary in the Algemeen Handelsblad, Berg was mainly responsible for the models, while Kahn, a connoisseur of the silk industry who travelled abroad every year to buy silk, also ran the administration and the business side, kept in touch with the customers and trained the staff firmly but fairly. Kahn wrote the firm's advertisements himself, and in 1928 he claimed that Hirsch had been the first firm in its trade to advertise. The house's customers included Queen Emma and Queen Wilhelmina.

In 1895 Kahn and Berg bought the Vienna fashion house of Drecoll, and Kahn became increasingly occupied with it. In 1902 the firm opened a Paris house, of which Kahn became general manager, while two employees of the Amsterdam house took charge of its day-to-day running and Berg took over the general management in Amsterdam. The partners' new store on the Leidseplein, designed by Alphons Jacot, opened in November 1912. After Berg's death in 1924, Kahn's eldest son, Bernard Arnold Kahn, joined the management. In 1928 Kahn recalled that in the early years he had often stayed at the office until midnight or later, and said that the firm still worked on Saturday afternoons.

== Personal life ==
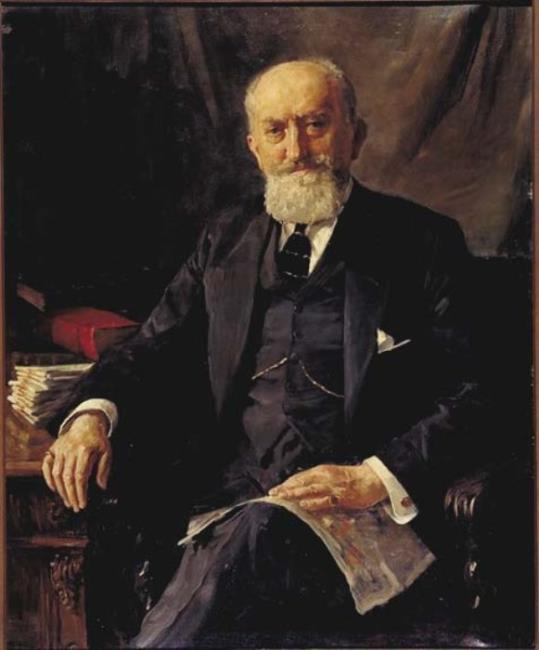
Portrait by Baruch Lopes Leão de Laguna, 1922 (Jewish Historical Museum, Amsterdam)

Kahn married Berg's younger sister Julie (1861–1935) in Cologne on 29 May 1885. They had five children: Bernard Arnold (1886–1941), Caroline Alice (1887–1972), Henri René (1888–1970), Salomon Paul (1892–1893) and Sophie Marthe (1893–1943). The family lived above the shop until 1898, when Kahn and Berg moved into a house they had bought in 1897 from A.F. Insinger at P.C. Hooftstraat 183, near the Vondelpark. A wing was added for the Kahn family, with its own entrance on the Van Eeghenlaan; Bakker and Huyser attribute the conversion to Jacot. Their children were Dutch nationals from birth, which Bakker and Huyser take as a sign that Kahn was naturalised early, although they found no record of it. In 1922 he was painted by Baruch Lopes de Leao Laguna; the portrait is in the collection of the Jewish Museum in Amsterdam.

Kahn died in Amsterdam on 3 December 1929, aged 72. His obituaries described him as a philanthropist who did good quietly and helped individuals who appealed to him as well as charities. The board of the Hirsch & Cie staff pension fund recorded that he had laid its foundations and made its creation possible. A large crowd followed his coffin to the Jewish cemetery at Muiderberg.

Two of his children died in the Holocaust. Bernard Arnold Kahn was arrested by the German occupiers in January 1941 and died in Buchenwald, and Sophie Kahn was deported by way of Westerbork to Auschwitz, where she died in 1943. Henri René Kahn survived the war in hiding and helped to restart the business afterwards.
