= Hirsch & Cie =

Defunct Belgian and Dutch fashion house

Coordinates: 52°21′48.77″N 4°52′57.16″E

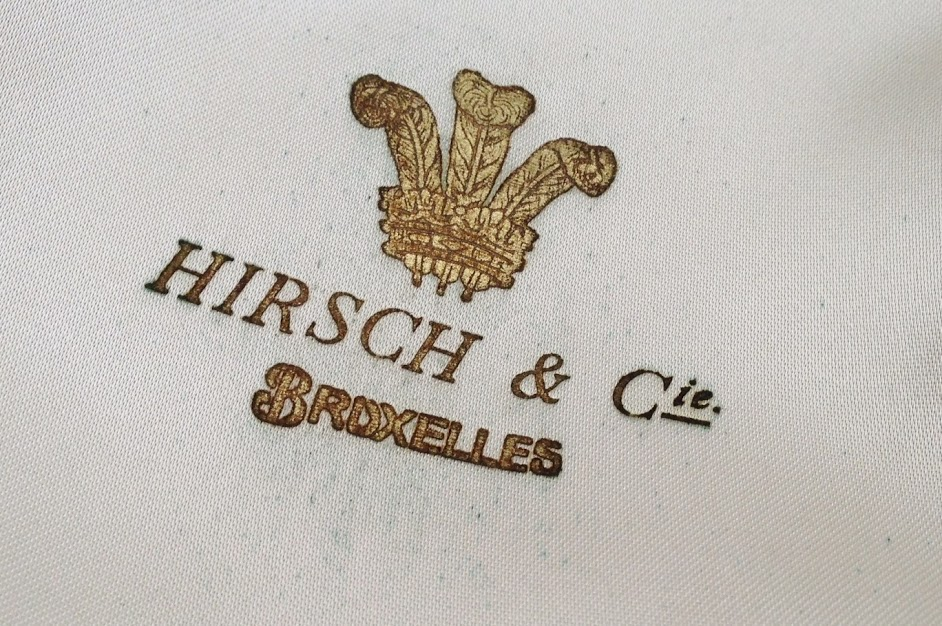

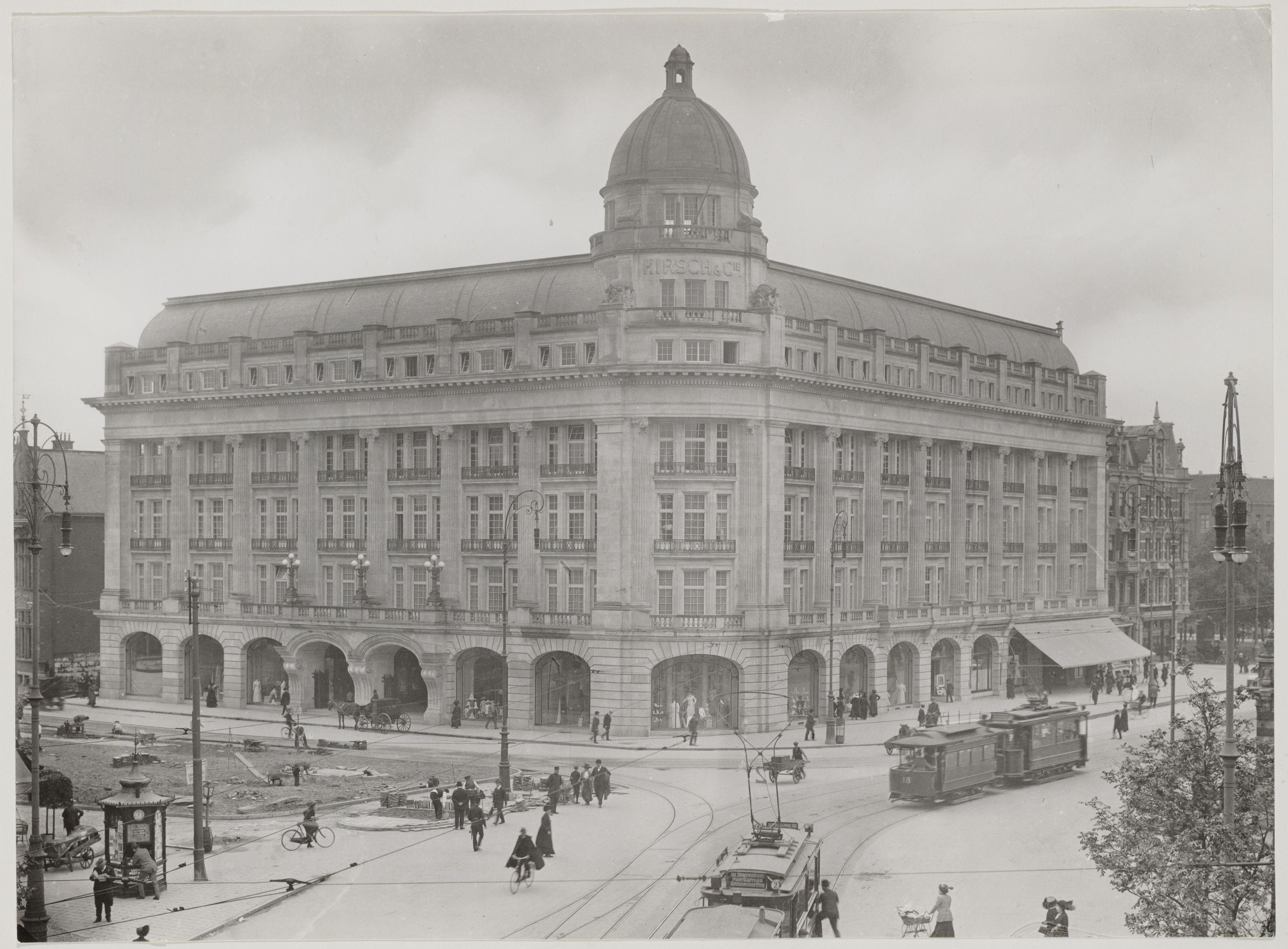
- The Amsterdam store on the Leidseplein, photographed by Jacob Merkelbach in 1913
- Native name: Maison Hirsch & Cie
- Type: Limited partnership
- Industry: Fashion, haute couture, furs
- Founded: April 1869 in Brussels
- Founder: Léo Hirsch and Johanna Freudenberg
- Defunct: 1962 (Brussels); 1976 (Amsterdam)
- Headquarters: Brussels, Belgium
- Area served: Belgium, Netherlands, Germany
- Key people: Sylvain Kahn, Sally Berg (Amsterdam)
- Products: Haute couture, ready-to-wear, furs, accessories

Hirsch & Cie was a fashion house founded in Brussels in 1869 by the German-born Jewish merchant Léo Hirsch (1842–1906) and his wife, Johanna Freudenberg. The firm and the houses that bore its name in Amsterdam, Cologne, Dresden and Hamburg dressed the wealthy of their cities in versions of Paris fashions. The Brussels house closed in 1962.

The best documented of the branches is the Amsterdam house on the Leidseplein, opened in 1882 by two of Hirsch's former employees, Sylvain Kahn and Sally Berg. According to the Textile Research Centre in Leiden, it introduced haute couture to the Netherlands and staged the country's first fashion show for an invited audience, at the opening of its new building in 1912. Its customers included members of the Dutch royal family. Under the German occupation of the Netherlands the Jewish directors were removed and the business was closed in 1943. It reopened in 1948 but never regained its former position, and closed in 1976. The building, now known as the Hirschgebouw, is a rijksmonument. Since 2012 it has housed the first Apple Store in the Netherlands.

== Brussels (1869–1962) ==
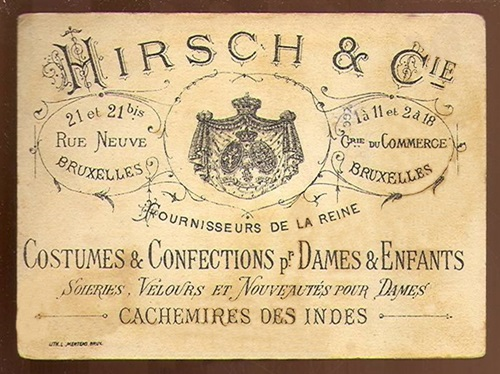
Advertisement for the Brussels house

Léo Hirsch, born Levi Hirsch in Altena in Westphalia, and Johanna Freudenberg married in 1869 and in the same year founded Maison Hirsch & Cie as a limited partnership. The shop opened in April 1869 at the corner of the Rue Neuve and the Pont-Neuf in central Brussels, financed in part by a Dutch partner. It moved in 1872 into the newly built Galerie du Commerce, designed by Edmond Legraive, and was enlarged several times; Franz de Vestel designed a new façade in 1905. The house sold women's clothing, silks and shawls, and by the 1880s concentrated on evening, wedding and day dresses, with furs from 1886. It kept haute couture and ready-made clothing as two separate lines, bought models from the leading Paris houses and reproduced them for its customers. Furs later became its main speciality.

The firm became a supplier to Queen Marie Henriette in 1881, after making the trousseau of Princess Stéphanie, and was later appointed supplier to Queen Elisabeth and Princess Marie-José. Until the First World War most of the staff were Jewish and of German or Austrian origin. Hirsch ran the business alone until 1893, when his cousin Bernard Liebreich became a partner. (Note: Pouillard records Liebreich as a registered associate from 1877.) After Hirsch's death in 1906 the firm was managed by two Hamburg merchants until his grandsons were old enough to take over; Jean-Paul Hirsch ran it from 1922. In August 1942 he left for southern France and joined the Resistance, and the company was placed under German control. Business was good again in the 1950s, but the firm had been declining for some time, and it was voluntarily wound up in 1962. The family kept its property.

The houses in Cologne, Dresden and Hamburg were set up by former employees or relatives of Hirsch under contracts by which they paid him for the use of the name for about twenty years, after which they became independent. The Brussels firm also ran a seasonal shop at the Kursaal in Ostend from 1926 to 1934.

== Amsterdam (1882–1976) ==
=== Foundation and growth ===
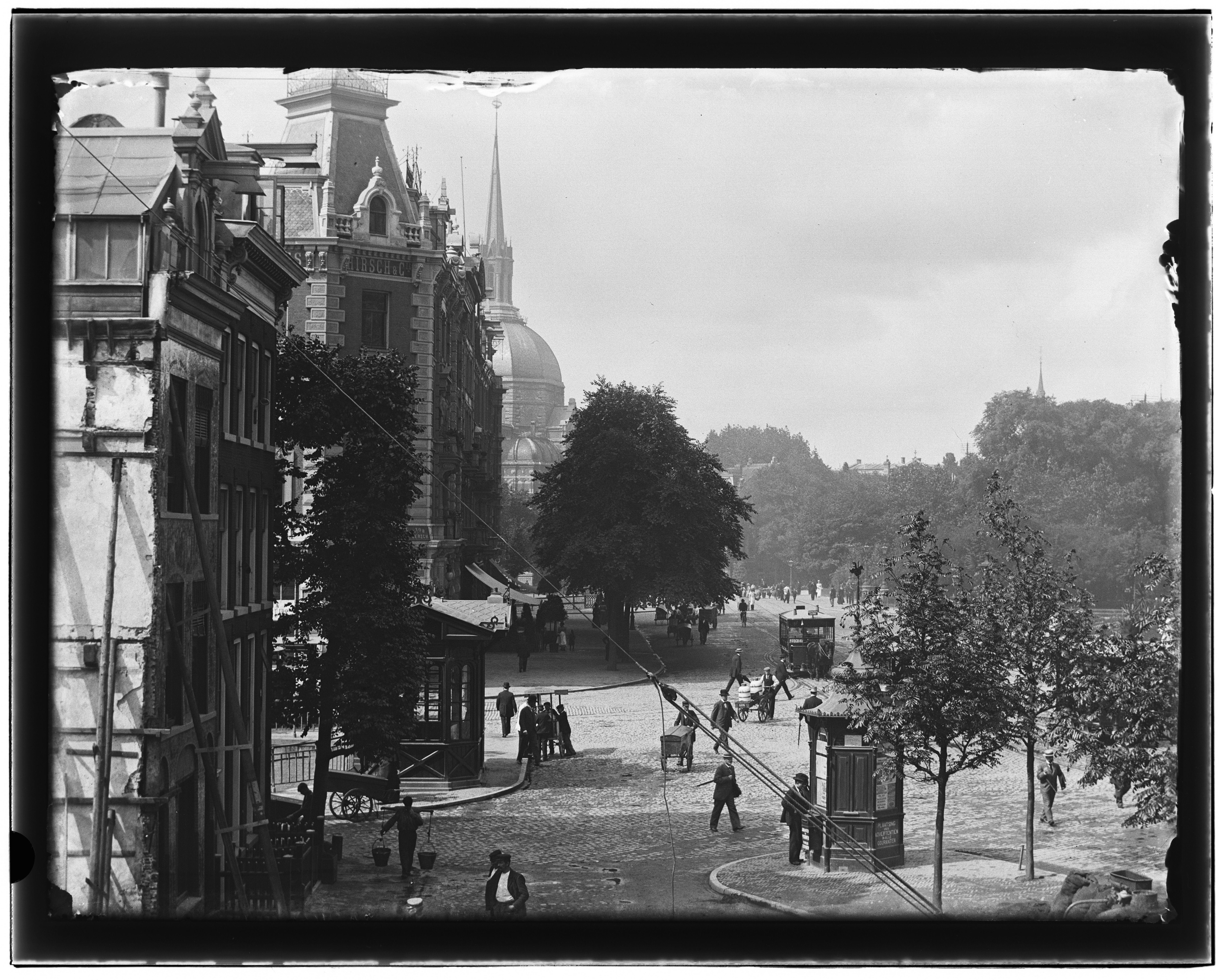
The earlier Hirsch premises on the Leidseplein, photographed by Jacob Olie in 1899 (centre)

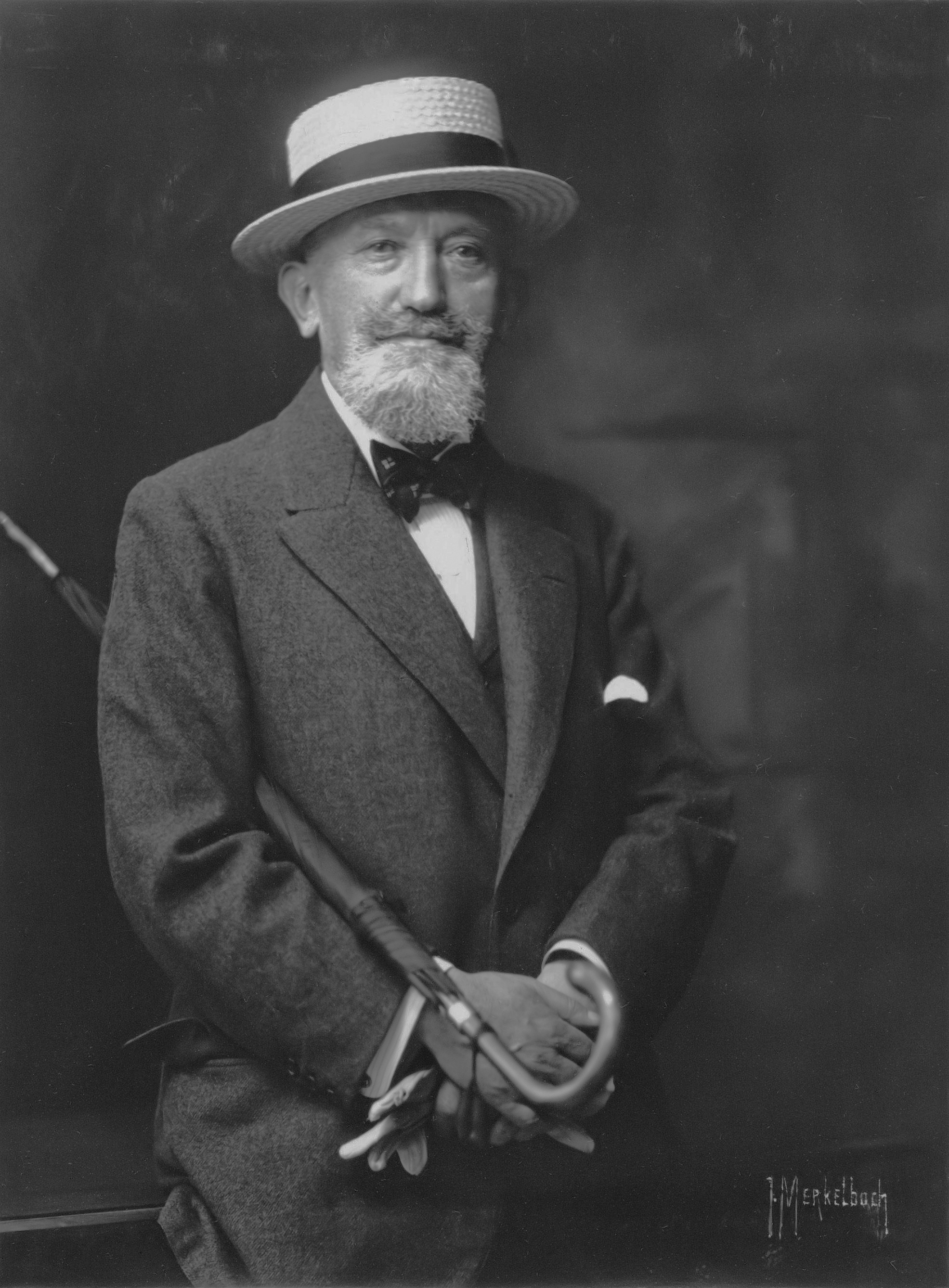
Sylvain Kahn in 1916

Sylvain Kahn, from Schirrhoffen in Alsace, and Sally Berg, from Warburg in Westphalia, were both born in 1857 and met as young employees of Léo Hirsch in Brussels. Hirsch supplied the start-up capital, the name and the business model of the Amsterdam branch in return for a share of its profits. Kahn ran the house and Berg was responsible for the models and design. The shop opened on 25 September 1882 in a building on the corner of the Leidseplein and the Weteringschans, (Note: The Bakker and Huyser history, which says the building had belonged to the piano dealer Jan Ebbeler, gives 25 September 1882 in one place and November 1882 in another; a table in Pouillard's history of the Brussels house gives 1883, and Schijf's review of Knoop's history gives 1884.) with twelve staff in the shop and about fifty in the workrooms.

In a 1928 newspaper interview Kahn recalled that he had first come to the Netherlands in April 1882 to sell silks for the Brussels house, and found the women so badly dressed that he felt he had arrived in China. On the last day of his trip he found a building on the Leidseplein that was being fitted out for a piano dealer. People thought the location absurd, since the square was then on the outskirts of the city, but Kahn wanted a shop on a square where carriages could wait, as in Paris. Early demand was such that Kahn soon brought twenty or thirty seamstresses from Brussels, and a swindler who had set up a fake "provisional office" of Hirsch & Cie on the Singel managed to intercept goods worth thirty to forty thousand guilders before he was caught and sentenced to seven years in prison. Kahn also claimed that Hirsch had been the first firm in its trade to advertise.

Hirsch started as an exclusive couture house on the Paris model and later added ready-to-wear and accessories, including underwear, furs, hats, jewellery, cosmetics and perfume. Most of the couturiers were French-speaking Belgians, and shop staff were at first expected to speak some French; many of the live-in milliners were young Jewish women. The firm bought the neighbouring buildings one after another between 1887 and 1909, by which time it owned Leidseplein 13–31 and Weteringschans 1–5. It employed about 450 people in the 1890s and some 500 by 1911, at least 200 of them in outside workrooms.

The customers were wealthy women from Amsterdam and from across the country. Queen Emma bought at Hirsch, and Queen Wilhelmina occasionally visited the shop, though she usually had the collection shown at her palace. In 1895 Kahn and Berg bought the Vienna fashion house Drecoll, and in 1902 they opened a Drecoll house in Paris.

=== The 1912 building ===
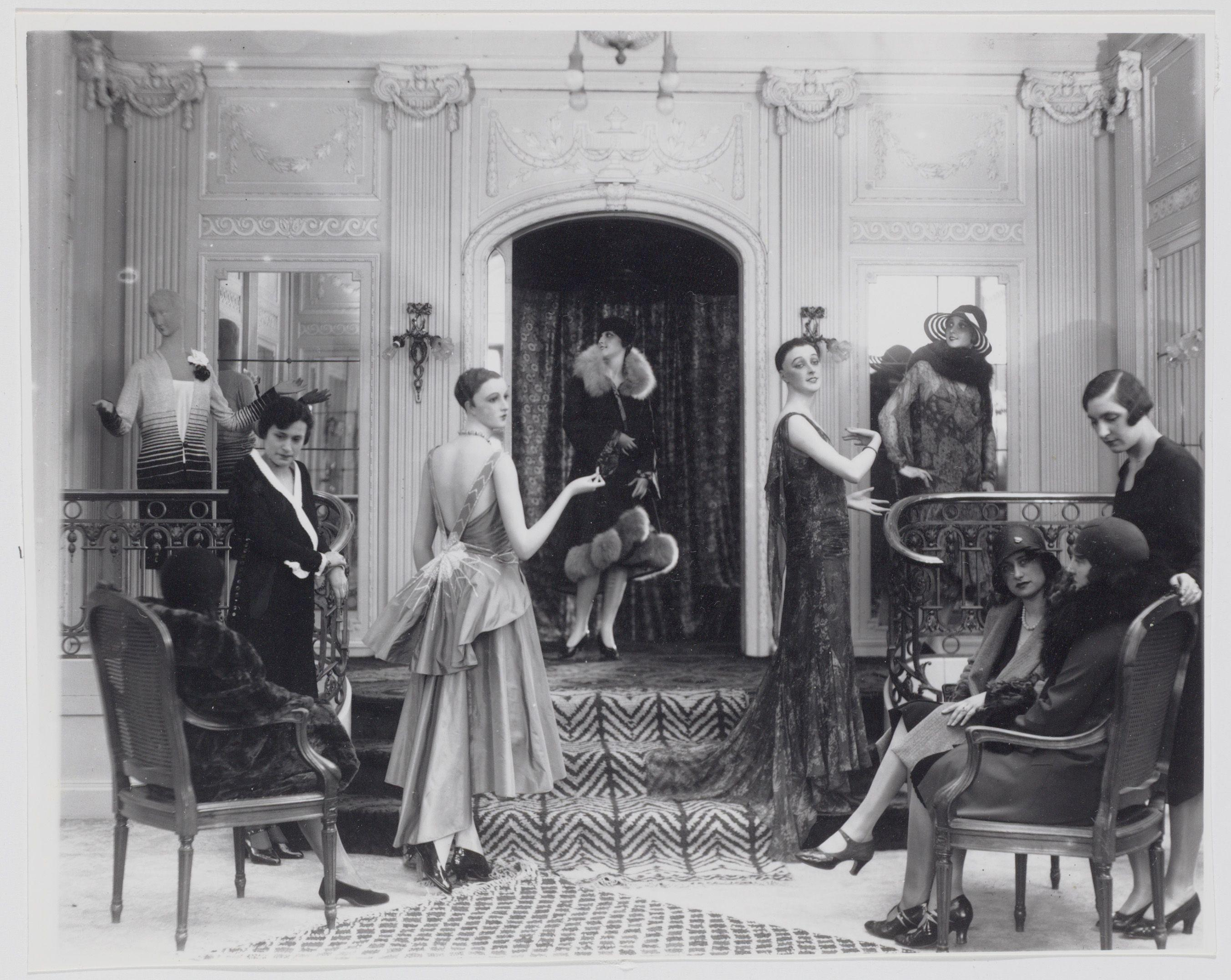
The women's fashion department, photographed by Merkelbach around 1920

To replace its older premises, the firm commissioned a new department store from the architect Alphons Jacot, assisted by J.G. Snuif. It was built between 1911 and 1913 on the corner of the Leidseplein and the Kleine-Gartmanplantsoen, in a style the heritage register describes as Um 1800, with the structural work by the Amsterdamsche Cement-IJzerfabriek Wittenburg, ornamental ironwork from F.W. Braat of Delft and fittings and furniture by Mutters & Co of The Hague. The site covered about 3,350 square metres and the building cost 1.2 million guilders. The city's aesthetics committee objected to the design, which was changed under its pressure. Some critics called it a copy of Selfridges in London; one newspaper described it as a white palace, while others thought it out of place in Amsterdam.

The building opened on 14 November 1912 with a reception and a fashion show using mannequins from the Paris houses of Drecoll and Paquin. The Textile Research Centre describes it as the first fashion show for an invited public in the Netherlands. The photographer Jacob Merkelbach later had his studio in the building, and photographs taken there of Hirsch models appeared in magazines.

=== Mannequins and the interwar years ===
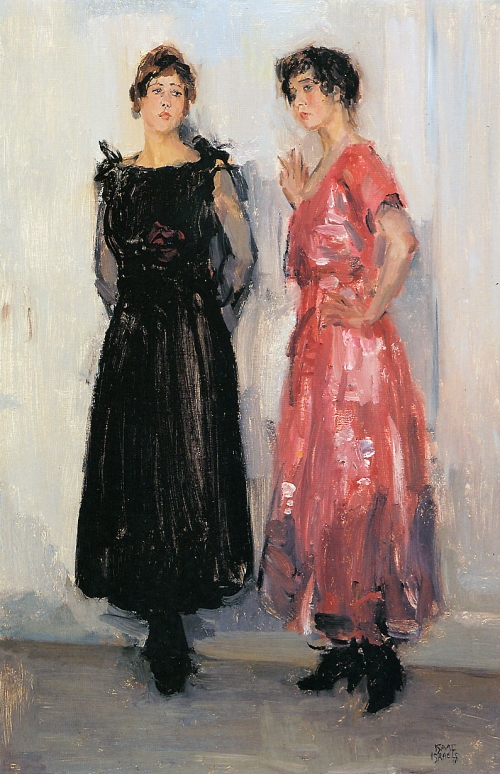
Isaac Israëls, Ippy and Gertie Posing at Fashion House Hirsch, Amsterdam, c. 1916

The painter Isaac Israëls was given access to the fashion shows, fitting rooms and workrooms and painted many scenes at Hirsch, in particular of the twin models Ippy and Gertie Wehmann. From 1915 all the house's mannequins were Dutch, and four were kept on the staff. During and after the First World War the firm held Thé-Select shows, at which customers watched the collection over afternoon tea; one in 1916 drew about 450 visitors. It added baby clothes and table and bed linen, opened a beauty salon, and let space in the building to Elizabeth Arden, later Helena Rubinstein, and the diamond firm Asscher. In the 1920s René Kahn proposed a high-quality ready-to-wear line. The firm had its own advertising department, and its advertisements, at first in French, soon appeared in Dutch.

Sally Berg died in 1924 and Sylvain Kahn in 1929. Kahn's son Bernard Arnold Kahn then ran the firm with his brother Henri René Kahn and Berg's nephew Robert Berg. In the 1930s trade unions criticised working conditions at Hirsch, complaining of compulsory overtime, threats of dismissal and overcrowded, unsafe workrooms. The Great Depression hit the regular customers. In the late 1930s the firm helped Jewish families who had fled Nazi Germany, among them the Berlin designer Richard Goetz.

=== Occupation ===
After the German invasion in May 1940 the firm adapted to the new regime in public, advertising in Dutch fascist publications and staging a show with German tastes in mind. Shortly before the war some members of staff had joined the NSB. Bernard Arnold Kahn was arrested on 15 January 1941 after an anti-German speech he had given on New Year's Eve, and died in Buchenwald on 29 May 1941. The occupation authorities placed the business under a Verwalter (administrator) and the Jewish directors were forced out. Other members of the family bought protection by handing over paintings and jewellery; Sophie Kahn, Sylvain's youngest daughter, was nevertheless deported in 1943 by way of Westerbork to Auschwitz, where she died. Jewish employees were arrested and sent to the camps, and few returned. In 1943 the store was officially closed, and its stock and fittings were shipped to Germany or disappeared.

=== Post-war years and closure ===
Henri René Kahn survived the war in hiding on the Veluwe, and Robert Berg also survived. For a time the firm traded from Kalverstraat 100 and sent its customers postcards about its stock. The family recovered the building in 1947, on condition that the building and the business were separated: Hirsch kept the ground floor and half of the first floor, and the rest was let to other firms, among them British European Airways. The architects Alexander Bodon and Hein Salomonson remodelled the shop, replacing its Louis XV and Louis XVI interiors with an open modern space, and it reopened on 7 May 1948. The firm celebrated its 75th anniversary in 1957.

The house struggled to restart for lack of capital and could not rebuild its pre-war clientele. Young women of the post-war generation wanted to dress differently from their mothers, and the youth fashion of the 1960s made Hirsch's style look old-fashioned. The historian Huibert Schijf has argued that the decline began earlier, because Hirsch's prices were high for a Dutch clientele that remained sober in its tastes. The shop closed in 1976.

=== Building after 1976 ===
The Hirschgebouw in 2019

The Hirschgebouw was registered as a rijksmonument in 2001. After the war the upper floors housed airline offices, including those of Pan Am and Aerolíneas Argentinas, and the Merkelbach studio. In 2011 Apple announced plans for a store in the building. The Netherlands' first Apple Store opened there on 3 March 2012, with sales on the ground floor and a service floor reached by a glass spiral staircase; the historic features of the interior were kept visible. The store is still in the building. Three of the four chandeliers from the Hirsch store were moved to the Stadsschouwburg across the square.

== Collections and historiography ==
Garments with Hirsch labels are held by Dutch museums, among them the Centraal Museum in Utrecht, which has a 1970 dress sold by Hirsch under a Jean Patou boutique label, and the Textile Research Centre in Leiden, which has two wartime pieces from the early 1940s, one of them with its Hirsch label made illegible. Femke Knoop's history of the Amsterdam house, published in 2018 and based on her doctoral research, was described by reviewers as a rare scholarly business history of a Dutch fashion house; Anneleen Arnout praised its attention to material culture and to the customer's experience, while Schijf regretted that it did not engage more with the sociology of fashion.

== Gallery ==
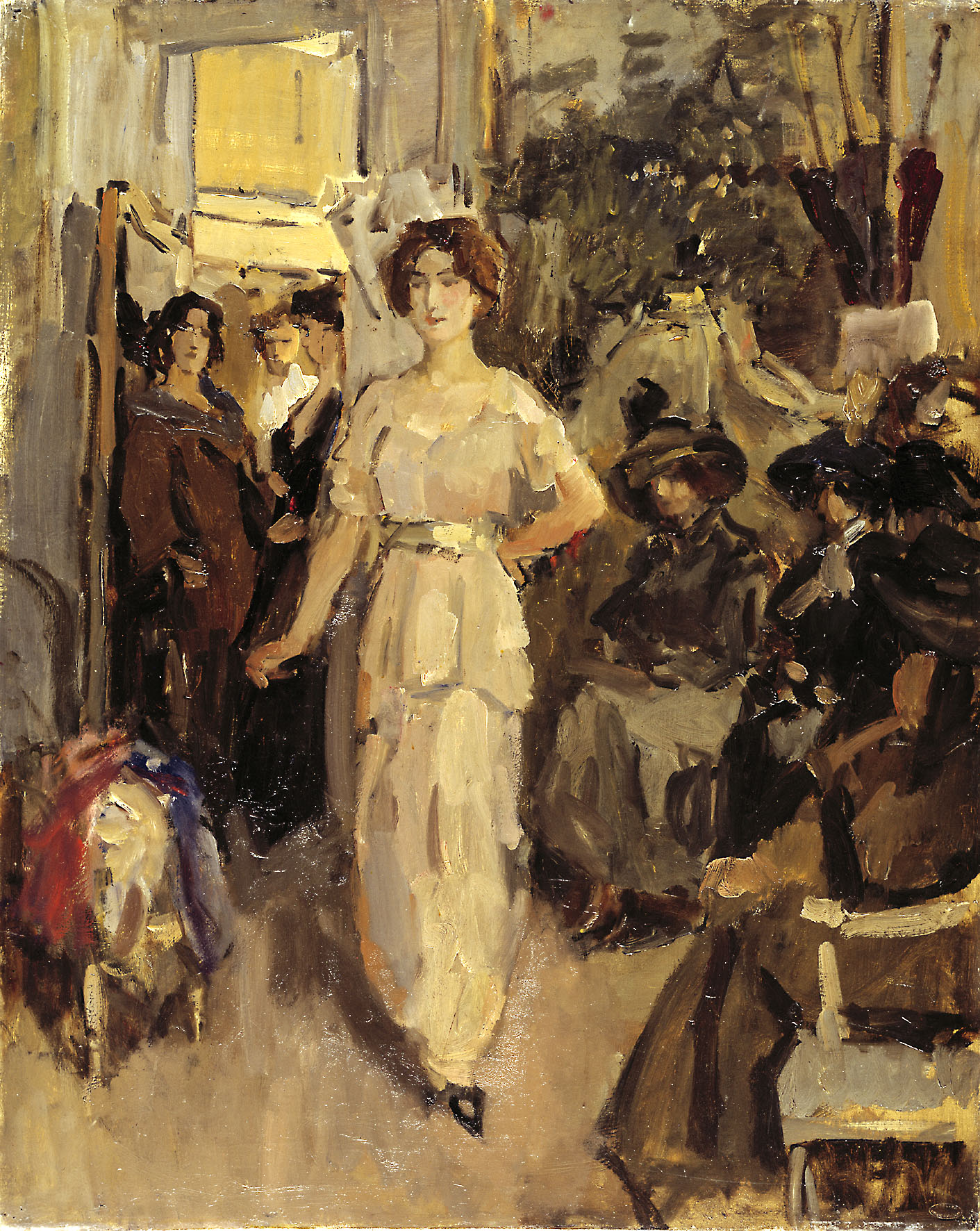
Isaac Israëls, Fashion show at Hirsch & Cie, 1910s (Jewish Historical Museum, Amsterdam)

The store lit up at night

Staff and management of the Amsterdam house

Dress by Hirsch & Cie (Rijksmuseum)

Hirsch box (Rijksmuseum)

75th anniversary, 1957

Label of the Cologne house
