= Ippy and Gertie Posing at Fashion House Hirsch, Amsterdam =

Oil painting by Isaac Israëls

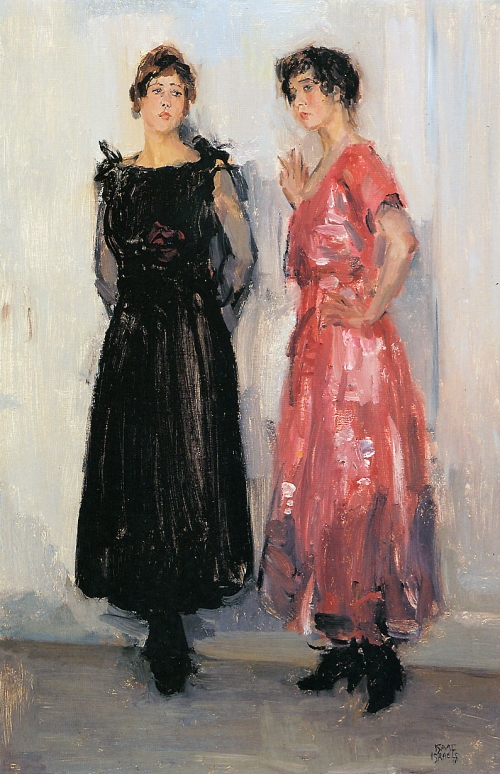
- Artist: Isaac Israëls
- Year: c. 1916
- Medium: Oil-on-canvas
- Movement: Realism (arts)
- Dimensions: 79.5 cm × 51 cm (31.3 in × 20 in)
- Location: Private collection

Ippy and Gertie Posing at Fashion House Hirsch, Amsterdam is a circa 1916 oil on canvas painting by the Dutch artist Isaac Israëls. It depicts the twin sisters Helena (1895–1964) and Geertruida Wehmann (1895–1975), models at the Amsterdam fashion house Hirsch & Cie in the Leidseplein whose professional names were Ippy and Gertie respectively.

Israëls was introduced to the house by his childhood friend and portrait painter Thérèse Schwartze. He went on to portray the whole range of the world of haute couture, both in Amsterdam and Paris. His treatment is realist rather than glamorous, portraying seamstresses as well as their wealthy clients.

Hirsch & Cie in Amsterdam continued until 1943, when it was forced to close as part of the Nazi policy of dispossessing Jews of their property during the occupation of the Netherlands. It re-opened in 1948 after the war and continued until 1976 when it finally closed its doors. The premises are now occupied by an Apple Store.

== Israëls and Hirsch & Cie ==
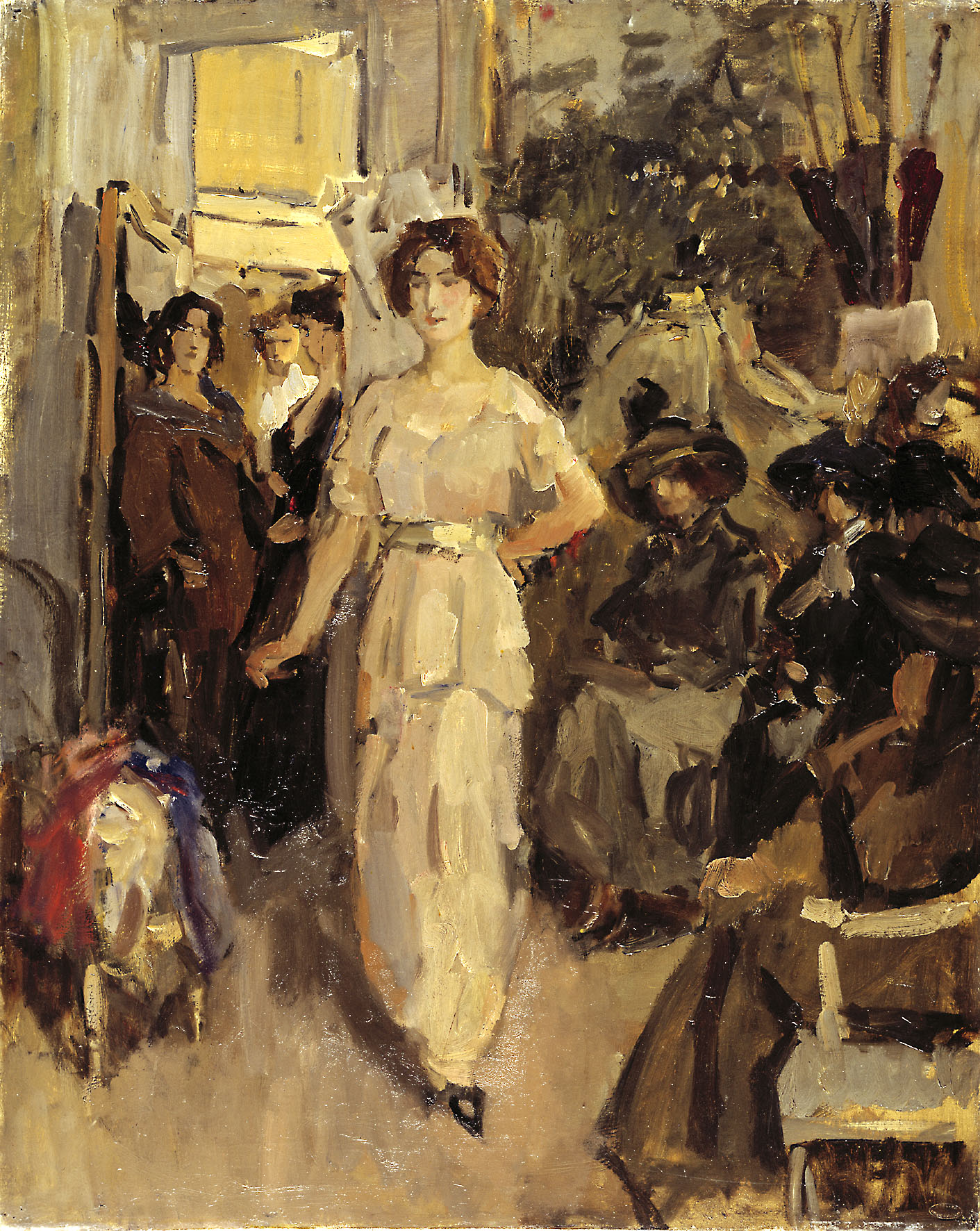
Isaac Israëls, Fashion show at Hirsch & Cie, between 1910 and 1920, Jewish Historical Museum, Amsterdam.

Christie's lot notes for its November 2012 sale of this painting observes that Isaac Israëls is the painter of modern life in fin-de-siècle Netherlands.

Isaac was the son of Jozef Israëls, the noted Hague School painter revered by Vincent van Gogh. Following some early training at the Royal Academy of Art, The Hague, where he met George Hendrik Breitner (the two are credited as founding the so-called school of Amsterdam Impressionism), Isaac followed the examples of Johannes Bosboom and van Gogh and spent time in the Borinage, the Belgian mining district. Although Breitner sketched with van Gogh in their student days at The Hague (Breitner was later dismissive of Vincent's "eskimo paintings", while Vincent in turn dismissed Breitner's efforts as "mouldy wallpaper"), there is no record of Israëls ever meeting van Gogh. He did however see a selection of Vincent's paintings at Theo van Gogh's art dealership while in Paris in 1889.

Israëls moved to Amsterdam in 1887 and together with Breitner enrolled at the National Academy. Both of them quickly abandoned the academy and Israëls set up on his own, initially following Breitner in favouring street scenes and night life. However the two fell out and Isaac began to shift his attention to the fashionable aspects of big city life, especially the London and Paris he was familiar with from an early age as a result of his travels with his cosmopolitan father.

Around 1900, his childhood friend Thérèse Schwartze introduced him to the fashion house Hirsch & Cie in the Leidseplein, Amsterdam. This concern of Belgian origin had begun 1881 as a conscious effort to introduce French haute couture to The Netherlands, and by 1900 had developed into one of the leading fashion houses in Europe. Israëls was given access to the fashions shows, as well as allowed behind the scenes in the fitting rooms and sewing ateliers, thus acquiring for himself a reputation not only as a painter of city life, but also of high fashion. He followed his father's realist traditions and avoided glamorous portrayals of the world of fashion, portraying seamstresses as well as the wealthy clients they served. Generally he depicted his subjects in grey and brown tones, reserving colour for accents and details such as cherry lips and blushing cheeks. This article's painting is unusual in that the two dresses contrast strongly, although the dark sand-coloured background is typical of his other work in the genre.

Israëls moved to Paris in 1903 and remained there until the outbreak of World War I. He continued his studies of the world of fashion at the fashion houses Paquin and Drecoll. He spent the first two years of the war in London, returning to Amsterdam in 1917. He then worked primarily as a portrait painter, notably of Mata Hari and Jo Bonger (Theo van Gogh's widow). He continued to record life at Hirsch & Cie. His favourite models at this time were the Wehmann twins, Ippy and Gertie.

== "Ippy en Gertie" ==
Ippy and Gertie were born 29 June 1895. At the age of sixteen, they were sent to London by their parents to broaden their education and to learn English. There their modelling talent was discovered and they went to work at the very fashionable Maison Lucile at 24 Burlington Street, whose clients included aristocracy, royalty, and theatre celebrities. Maison Lucile was founded by Lucy, Lady Duff-Gordon, who is credited as training the first professional models (mannequins as they were then called) and for inventing the catwalk. Duff-Gordon expanded her business to Paris, New York and Chicago. Ippy and Gertie spent some time in Paris as well.

Gertie got engaged to a French count while in Paris, but he was killed at the beginning of the war. The twins returned to Amsterdam and during the period 1916–1918 rose to ascendancy in the Amsterdam modelling world. It was as this time that Israëls made his many portraits of the twins.

The twins are said to have subsequently gained a minor role in a 1920 film starring Gloria Swanson, following which they quickly faded from view. They married and later lived in the Pieter Aertzstraat in the De Pijp district of Amsterdam.

Ippy died of a stroke in 1964, Gertie in 1975.

== Provenance ==
- Anonymous sale, Sotheby's, Mak van Waay, Amsterdam, 4 November 1985, lot 203.
- Anonymous sale, Glerum, Amsterdam, 28 April 1999, lot 88.
- Leslie Smith Gallery, Wassenaar.
- Acquired from the above by a private collector.
- Anonymous sale, Christie's, Amsterdam, 20 November 2012, lot 52: price realised €229,000 (including hammer price and buyer's premium).

== Exhibitions ==
- Kunsthal, Isaac Israels: Hollands Impressionist, 4 September 1999 - 9 January 2000, no. 120.
- Hague, Gemeentemuseum, Isaac Israels in de mode, 7 December 2002 - 9 March 2003, no. 120.
- The Hague, Gemeentemuseum, Jozef en Isaac Israëls: vader & zoon, 20 September 2008 - 8 February 2009.

== Gallery ==
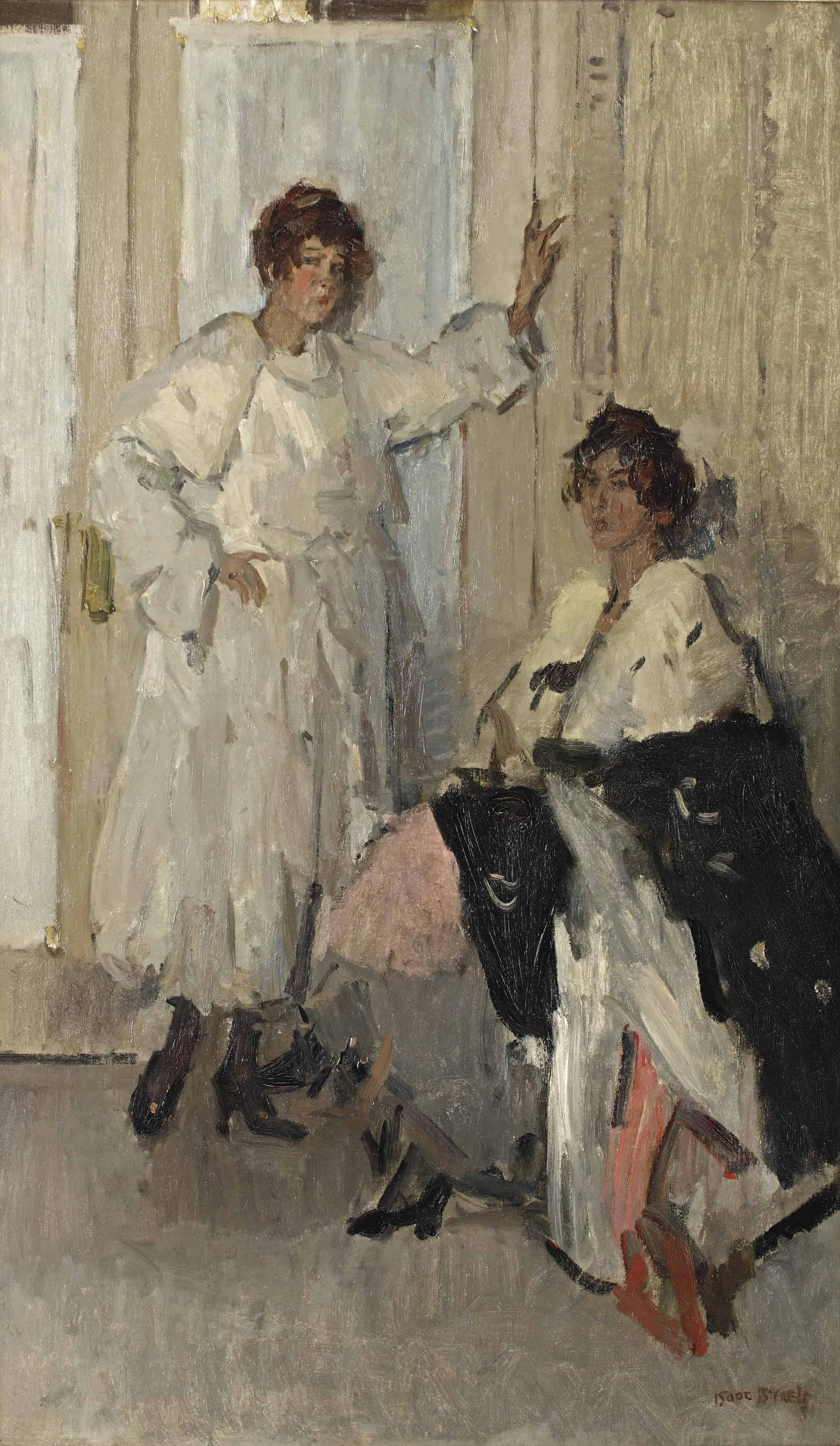
Ippy and Gertie at Hirsch

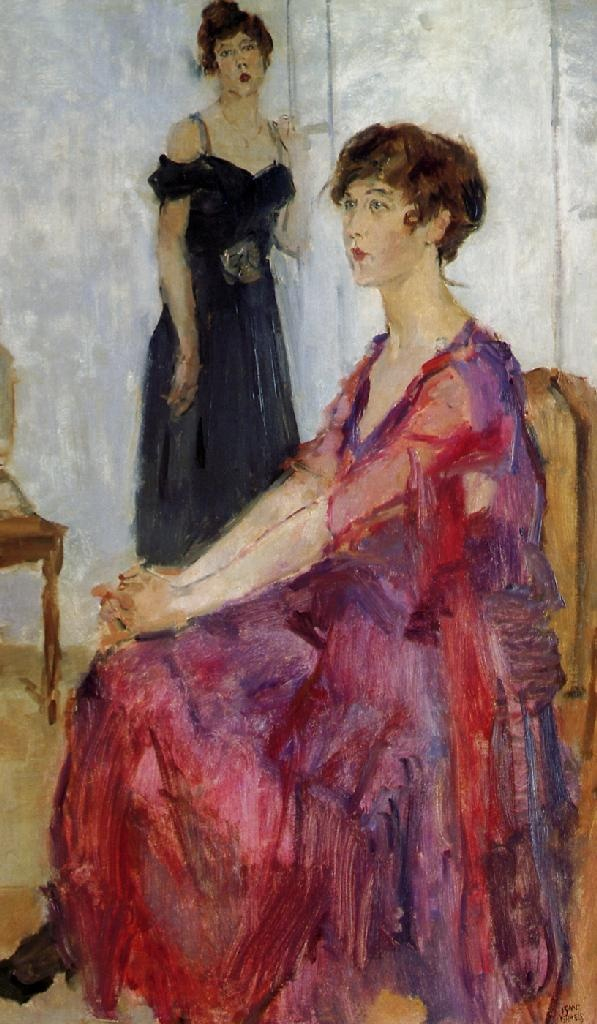
Ippy and Gertie in the sun

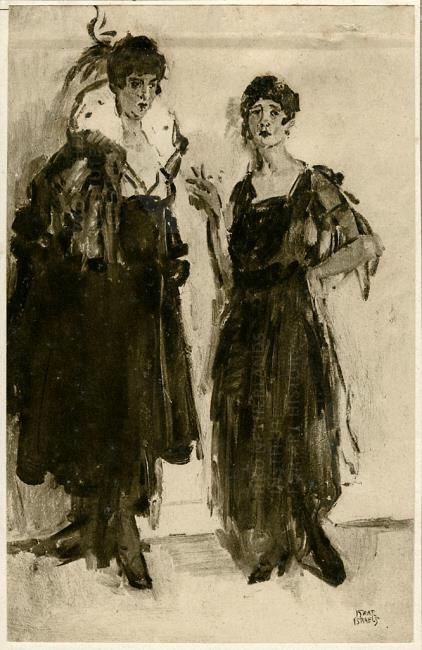
Ippy and Gertie posing

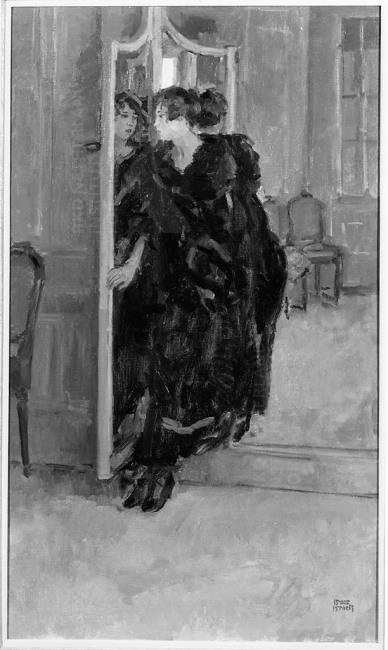
Gertie in front of a mirror at Hirsch

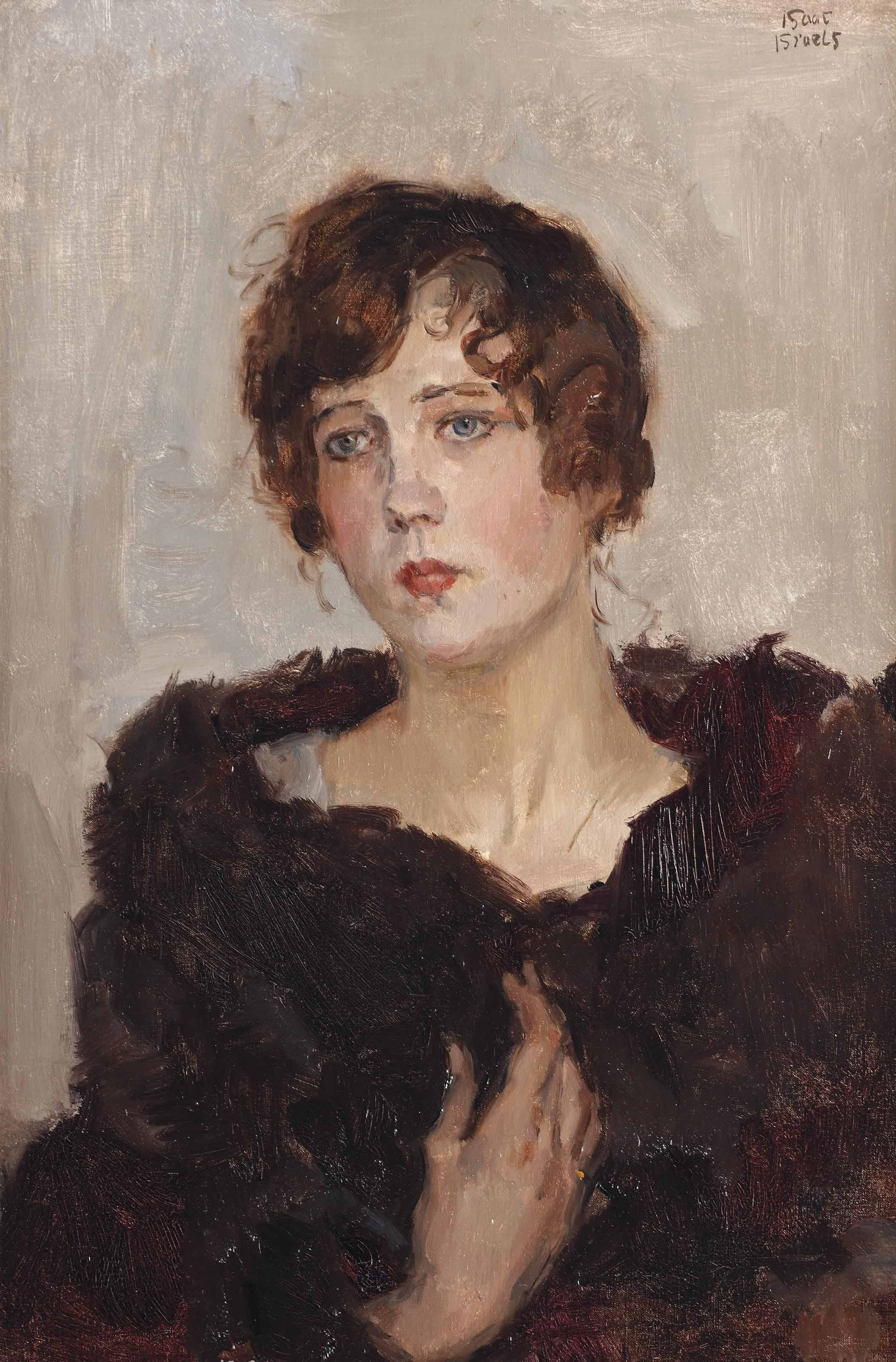
Gertie in a Fur Coat

== Sources ==
- Bodt, Saskia de, e.a. (2008): Isaac Israëls : Hollands impressionist. Scriptum Art, Schiedam, Blz. 87–98. ISBN 978-90-5594-595-5 (in Dutch).
- Nijenhuis, Hans te, & Ietse Meij (2002). Isaac Israëls : mannequins en mode. Pictures Publishers, Wijk en Aalburg, blz. 144-153 (chapter "Ippy en Gertie"). ISBN 90-73187-43-5 (in Dutch).
