= Sally Berg =

German-born couturier and co-founder of Hirsch & Cie Amsterdam (1857–1924)

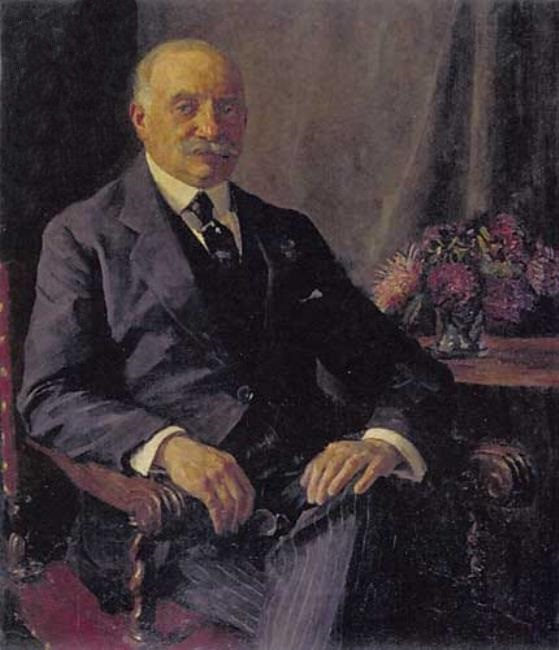
- Portrait by Baruch Lopes Leão de Laguna, c. 1922
- Born: Albert Sally Berg; 16 January 1857; Warburg, Westphalia, Prussia
- Died: 16 June 1924 (aged 67); Heemstede, Netherlands
- Resting place: Warburg
- Occupations: Couturier, businessman
- Known for: Co-founder and director of Hirsch & Cie in Amsterdam; designer for Drecoll
- Relatives: Sylvain Kahn (brother-in-law and business partner)

Albert Sally Berg (16 January 1857 – 16 June 1924) was a German-born Jewish couturier and businessman who, with Sylvain Kahn, founded the Amsterdam fashion house Hirsch & Cie on the Leidseplein in 1882 and directed it until his death. Trained at Léo Hirsch's fashion house in Brussels, he ran the Amsterdam house's couture, and after the partners bought the Vienna house of Drecoll in 1895 he took charge of the Amsterdam business while also designing for the Drecoll houses in Vienna and Paris, never under his own name. He was a benefactor of the Berg-Stichting, a home for Jewish children in Laren.

== Early life and Brussels ==
Berg was born in Warburg, in Westphalia, on 16 January 1857. He was one of eight children from the second marriage of the textile merchant Salomon Berg to Sophie Wittgenstein; his father had four children from an earlier marriage, and three of the twelve died young. The family name had been taken by Berg's grandfather in 1807, when the Jews of the new Kingdom of Westphalia were emancipated. Four of Berg's brothers became textile merchants like their father.

He went to Brussels as a teenager and was apprenticed at the fashion house of Léo Hirsch, another Westphalian, where he met Sylvain Kahn, a Jewish apprentice of the same age from Alsace. (Note: Bakker and Huyser say Berg started at Hirsch as a fifteen-year-old in one place and as a fourteen-year-old in another; the RKD dates his time in Brussels from 1873.) Within about ten years the two had risen to senior posts, Kahn as head of silks and Berg as head of haute couture.

== Hirsch & Cie in Amsterdam ==
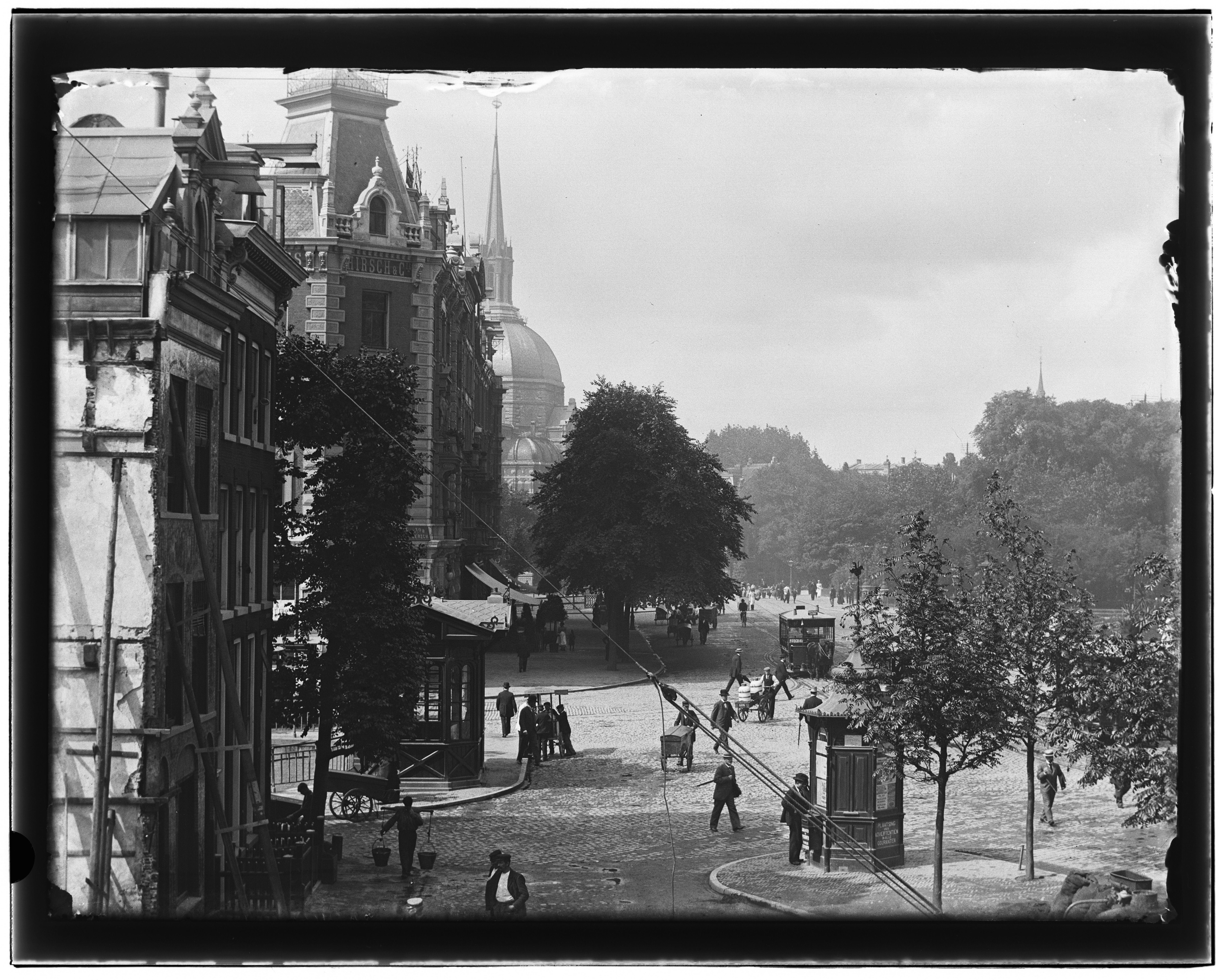
The first Hirsch & Cie premises on the Leidseplein (centre), 1899

It was Berg who, on a business trip, decided that Amsterdam would be a good place for a fashion house like Hirsch's. Léo Hirsch supplied the start-up capital and let the two use his firm's name and business model in return for a share of the profits, an arrangement Bakker and Huyser compare to franchising. The Amsterdam house was not a branch of the Brussels firm, and Kahn and Berg bore full responsibility for it. Maison Hirsch & Cie opened in 1882 in the former premises of a piano dealer on the corner of the Leidseplein and the Weteringschans. (Note: Bakker and Huyser give the opening date as 25 September 1882 in one place and November 1882 in another.) It modelled itself on the Paris couture houses: it designed models of which customers could have copies made to their own measurements, and over the years added children's clothes, lingerie, corsets, hats, shoes and other accessories, and later a beauty salon. Its customers included Queen Emma, and Queen Wilhelmina usually had the collection shown to her at her palace.

In 1885 Kahn married Berg's younger sister Julie (1861–1935). The two partners lived above the shop until 1898, when they moved into a house they had bought the year before at P.C. Hooftstraat 183, near the Vondelpark. The architect Alphons Jacot, who later designed the new Hirsch building, converted it for the two households and added a wing for the Kahn family with its own entrance on the Van Eeghenlaan. The partners also took their meals with the staff: Kahn and his family sat at the head of one table in the staff dining room and Berg at the head of the other.

== Drecoll and other ventures ==
In 1895 Kahn and Berg bought the Vienna fashion house of Drecoll. Kahn became increasingly occupied with Drecoll, and Berg took over the general management of the Amsterdam house. In 1902 the partners opened a Drecoll house in Paris, of which Kahn became general manager. Berg continued to take a large part in designing the couture for all the partners' houses, assisted by Marguerite von Wagner-Besançon, who had earlier worked for Hirsch in Amsterdam, but never put his own name to the designs. The Netherlands Institute for Art History (RKD), drawing on Dieuwke Grijpma's history of Dutch couture, records him as working in Paris from 1902 to 1912.

The house's new building on the Leidseplein, designed by Jacot, opened in November 1912 with a fashion show that the Textile Research Centre in Leiden calls the first in the Netherlands for an invited audience. Around the same time Berg opened a perfume factory in Neuilly-sur-Seine, which the RKD, following Grijpma, identifies as the d'Orsay factory and dates to 1912–1917. (Note: A history of the brand published by the Lightyears perfume collection names Siegfried and Sally Berg among the French, Dutch and German investors who formed the Compagnie Française des Parfums d'Orsay in 1908, together with Léo Fink and M. van Dyck.)

== Berg-Stichting ==
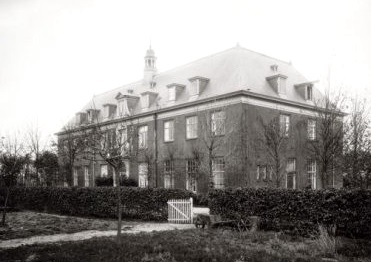
The Berg-Stichting in Laren, 1918

According to Bakker and Huyser, the directors of Hirsch & Cie bought 2.5 hectares of land in Laren in 1907, the house's 25th anniversary year, and built a convalescent home there for members of staff and their children; it became known as the Berg-Stichting and housed Jewish orphans until 1965. The Joods Monument describes the Berg-Stichting as a home opened in 1909 for Jewish children who had been orphaned or removed from their parents' custody by the courts, on an estate in Laren donated by Berg. (Note: Joods Amsterdam gives 1909 as the year Berg founded the Berg-Stichting and 1911 as the year the home opened, and says that it was dissolved on 19 August 1942 and had to vacate its building by 5 December 1942.) In 1940 it housed 106 children aged between four and 21. In early 1943 the home was moved on German orders to Rapenburg 92–96 in Amsterdam. Its non-Jewish director, Jan Reitsema, tried to protect the children and staff, and about 70 of the residents survived the war in hiding or with papers stating that they were not Jewish. Reitsema and his wife Tine were recognised by Yad Vashem as Righteous Among the Nations in 1964.

== Death and legacy ==
Berg never married. He died suddenly on 16 June 1924, aged 67, at his estate, Dennenheuvel, in Heemstede. (Note: The RKD gives the date of death as 18 June 1924. The death notice placed by Hirsch & Cie, published on 17 June 1924, gives 16 June.) He was cremated, and his ashes were taken to Warburg. An inscription on the Berg family vault in the town's Jewish cemetery commemorates him, and in his will he left Warburg 30,000 guilders, the interest on which was to be shared among the town's Jewish, Catholic and Protestant poor.

After his death Kahn's eldest son, Bernard Arnold Kahn, joined the management of Hirsch & Cie, later together with his brother Henri René Kahn and Berg's nephew Robert Berg. Bernard Arnold Kahn was arrested by the German occupiers in 1941 and died in Buchenwald; Robert Berg and Henri René Kahn survived the war and reopened the business.
