= Léo Hirsch =

German-born Belgian merchant (1842–1906)

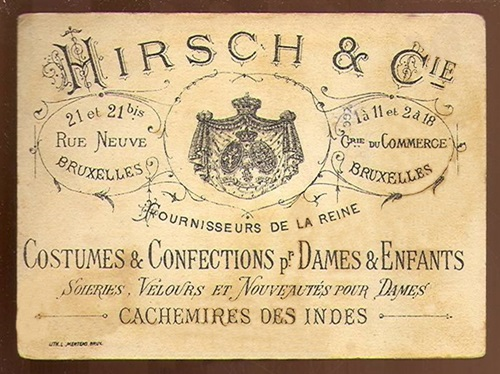
- Advertisement for Hirsch & Cie, Brussels, c. 1900
- Born: Levi Hirsch; 27 April 1842; Altena, Westphalia, Prussia
- Died: 15 January 1906 (aged 63); Brussels, Belgium
- Resting place: Dieweg Cemetery, Uccle
- Citizenship: Prussian; Belgian (from 1879)
- Occupations: Merchant, couturier
- Known for: Founder of Hirsch & Cie
- Spouse: Johanna Freudenberg (m. 1869)
- Children: 5, including Arthur Hirsch
- Awards: Knight of the Order of Leopold

Léo Hirsch (born Levi Hirsch; 27 April 1842 – 15 January 1906) was a German-born Jewish merchant who founded the Brussels fashion house Hirsch & Cie with his wife, Johanna Freudenberg, in 1869. The house became a supplier to the Belgian court, and Hirsch licensed its name to sister houses in Amsterdam, Cologne, Dresden and Hamburg run by former employees and relatives. Naturalised as a Belgian in 1879, he was made a knight of the Order of Leopold and sat on the boards of many Jewish institutions in Brussels.

== Early life ==
Levi Hirsch was born on 27 April 1842 in Altena, in the Prussian Province of Westphalia, the son of Israël Hirsch, a cattle dealer and butcher, by his third marriage. Because of his good handwriting he first found work as a clerk on the railways. He then answered an advertisement from the Loewenstein firm in Aachen, where he was taken on as an apprentice, and studied for a school certificate that exempted him from military service. When Philipp Freudenberg, an employee of the Loewenstein firm who was related to the family by marriage, took over a shop in Elberfeld, Hirsch went with him.

There he became engaged to Freudenberg's sister Johanna. Her family sent her to Brussels to work for her brother-in-law Siegfried Loewenstein, and Hirsch followed her, finding a job with the tie merchant Hayem.

== Hirsch & Cie ==
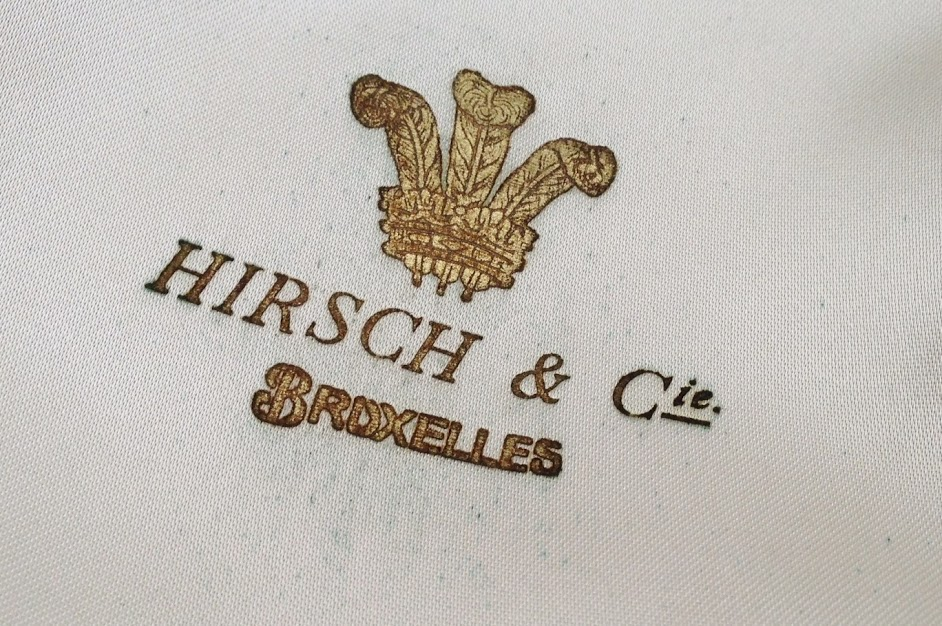
Logo of the Brussels house

Through Flora Loewenstein, Hirsch found a backer, a Dutchman named Van Witsen, who put 75,000 francs into the business as a limited partner; Hirsch himself had saved 15,000 francs. Van Witsen was to receive 30 per cent of the profits until his stake was repaid, and the last instalment was paid on 1 January 1886. Hirsch and Johanna Freudenberg married in a civil ceremony in Altena on 13 April 1869, followed by a religious wedding in Aachen the next day, and according to family tradition the shop opened the day after the wedding. It stood at the corner of the Rue Neuve and the Rue du Pont-Neuf, and was registered as a limited partnership, Maison Hirsch & Cie. In 1872 it moved into the new Galerie du Commerce on the Rue Neuve.

The house dressed the Brussels bourgeoisie in models bought from the leading Paris houses and made up for its customers. In 1881 it became a supplier to Queen Marie Henriette after making the trousseau of Princess Stéphanie. Hirsch's cousin Bernard Liebreich was listed as an associate from 1877. In 1894 Hirsch set up a pension fund for the firm's staff, which grew from about 36,000 francs in its first year to more than 172,000 francs in 1914.

Hirsch let former employees and relatives open houses under his firm's name. In 1882 two of his former employees, Sylvain Kahn and Sally Berg, opened Hirsch & Cie in Amsterdam. Hirsch supplied the start-up capital and the name. For the first ten years the profits were split equally between Hirsch on one side and Kahn and Berg on the other; for ten more years he received a royalty on the turnover, after which he had no further link with the Amsterdam house. Houses in Cologne (1889, under Max Loewenstein), Dresden (1889) and Hamburg (1893) were set up on similar terms, and became independent once their contracts expired.

== Public life ==
Hirsch was naturalised as a Belgian in February 1879 and in 1883 obtained the grande naturalisation, which gave full political rights and was rarely granted. He served in the Garde Civique, was made a knight of the Order of Leopold and was elected to the Conseil supérieur du commerce et de l'industrie, an advisory body to the government. According to his son Arthur, the Liberal politician Paul Janson offered him a candidacy for the Senate, which he declined.

In the Jewish community he sat on the Consistoire central israélite de Belgique and on the boards of the Brussels community and its synagogue. He was also vice-president of the regional committee of the Alliance Israélite Universelle and president of the Société israélite de bienfaisance, and from 1903 he chaired the burial society, which he had helped run for years. Pouillard notes that he had distanced himself from religious observance and that the household did not keep kashrut; she considers liberal Judaism the most likely description of his beliefs. At the suggestion of Belgium's chief rabbi, Armand Bloch, Hirsch founded the Villa Johanna at Middelkerke on the Belgian coast, a holiday home for Jewish children from Belgian schools that operated from 1901 to 1964.

== Family and death ==
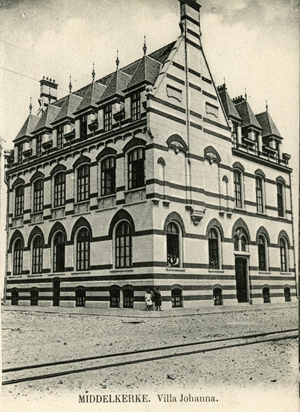
The Villa Johanna at Middelkerke, c. 1905

Hirsch, his wife and their five children, Régina, Arthur, Bertha, Ivan and Alice, lived on the second floor of the shop until 1886, when he bought the town house of the Count Goblet d'Alviella at the corner of the Rue Zinner and the Boulevard du Régent. Johanna Hirsch sat on the committee of a Brussels home for the elderly and was a member of a charitable loan society from 1871 to 1901. Their son Arthur Hirsch (1873–1933) wrote a short family history in 1929; his marriage to Clara Van Campenhout in 1895 was the first in the family outside the Jewish community.

Léo Hirsch died in Brussels on 15 January 1906 after a long illness. The Amsterdam firm's death notice called him its "highly esteemed friend, former partner and co-founder". He was buried on 17 January in the Jewish section of the Dieweg cemetery in Uccle, with his entire staff present. Three carriages were needed for the wreaths, and the Brussels newspaper L'Indépendance remembered him as a generous benefactor of his employees and the poor. In his funeral address, Armand Bloch quoted Hirsch's saying, "One must buy the right to be happy". His grave, in the Roman style, carries no religious symbols.

After his death the firm was run by two merchants from Hamburg until his grandsons were old enough to take over; one of them, Jean-Paul Hirsch, managed it from 1922 until it was wound up in 1962.
