= Baruch Lopes Leão de Laguna =

Dutch painter (1864–1943)

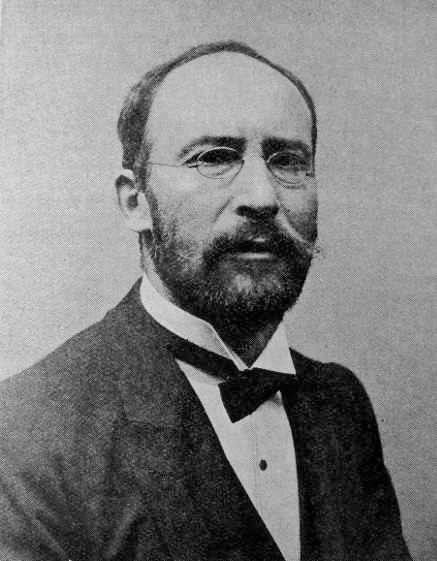
Baruch Lopes Leão de Laguna (c.1900)

Baruch Lopes Leão de Laguna (16 February 1864, Amsterdam – 19 November 1943, Auschwitz) was a Dutch painter of Portuguese-Jewish ancestry; associated with the Laren School. He is known primarily for portraits, genre scenes and still-lifes of flowers. He and his wife were both murdered in the Holocaust.

== Biography ==
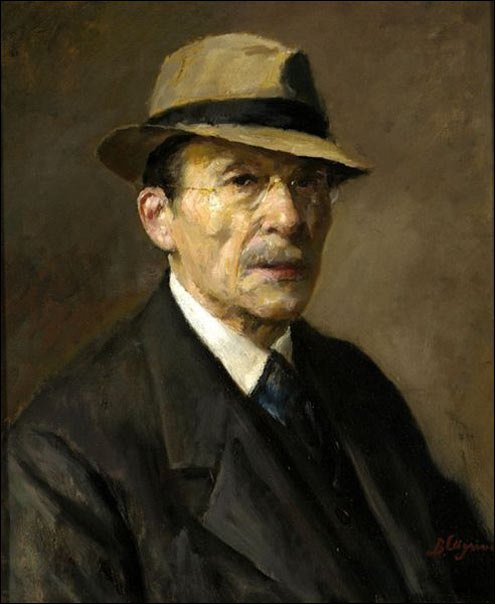
Self-portrait (c.1940)

He was born to a Sephardic family that originally came from Portugal. Both of his parents died when he was eleven and he was placed in an orphanage operated by the Portuguese Synagogue of Amsterdam. During his stay there, he began making sketches. His talent was noticed and, at the age of fourteen, he began training as a decorative painter at the Quellinusschool. He then transferred to the Dutch State Academy of Fine Arts, where he studied with August Allebé, among others.

At seventeen, he left the orphanage and opened a studio in the Plantage neighborhood of the Jodenbuurt. He also worked in the studios of Meijer de Haan and provided illustrations for magazines. A drawing on the first page of the monthly Elsevier's Geïllustreerd Maandschrift introduced him to the general public. In 1885, he was given an exhibition at Arti et Amicitiae which was well received.

In 1895, he married Rosie Asscher, the daughter of a diamond cutter from London. Three years later, they moved to Laren where he became associated with the Laren School. Later, they lived in neighboring Blaricum and he eventually opened a studio in Laren in 1905. He focused on portraits; notably those of Prime Minister Hendrikus Colijn, Ferdinand Domela Nieuwenhuis and Henri Deterding. His wife was in poor health, so he also created numerous still lifes of flowers in vases while looking after her. In 1934, a major exhibition was held at the Hotel Hamdorff in Laren; a notable meeting place for artists.

When his son, Martijn, was killed in a motorcycle accident, he became thoroughly absorbed in his work. In 1941, the Jüdische Wochenblatt Amsterdam described him as a modest man of high standards who opposed injustice.

Following the German occupation, he was able to maintain a low profile at an isolated farm in Laren for a few years. However, in 1943, he and Rosie were tracked down and taken to Auschwitz. He was murdered later that year and she followed early the next year.

== Selected paintings ==
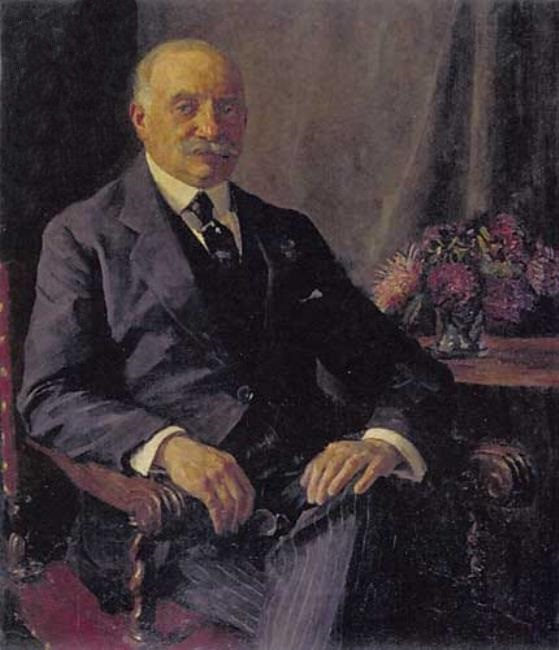
Fashion designer
Sally Berg

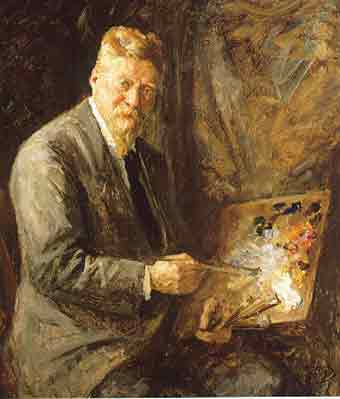
Evert Pieters

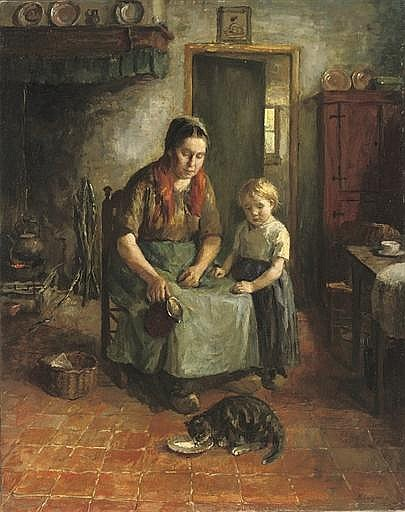
Feeding the Kitten

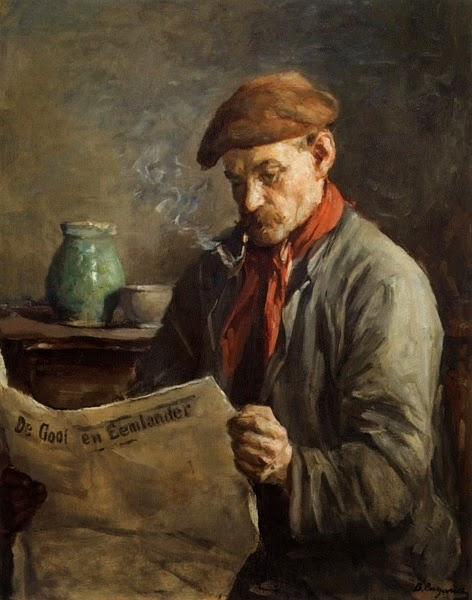
Man Reading the Eemlander
