= Schirrhoffen =

- Commune
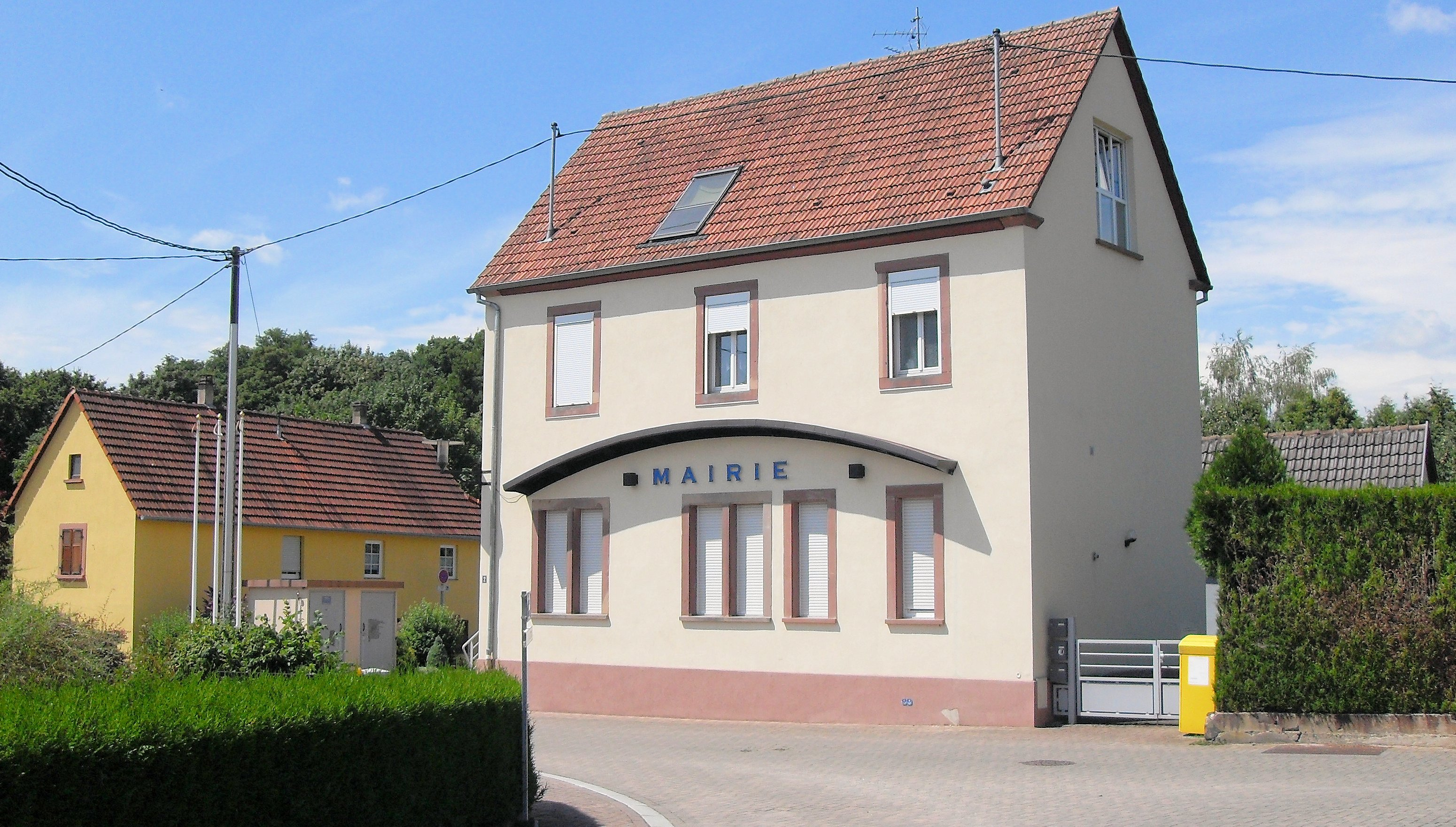
- The town hall in Schirrhoffen

- Coat of arms
- Location of Schirrhoffen
- Location within France Location within Grand Est
- Coordinates: 48°48′25″N 7°55′22″E
- Country: France
- Region: Grand Est
- Department: Bas-Rhin
- Arrondissement: Haguenau-Wissembourg
- Canton: Bischwiller
- Intercommunality: CA Haguenau

Government
  - Mayor (2020–2026): Christine Heitz
- Area^{1}: 0.63 km^{2} (0.24 sq mi)
- Highest elevation: 138 m (453 ft)
- Lowest elevation: 119 m (390 ft)
- Population (2023): 838
  - Density: 1,300/km^{2} (3,400/sq mi)
- Time zone: UTC+01:00 (CET)
  - Summer (DST): UTC+02:00 (CEST)
- INSEE/Postal code: 67450 /67240
- ^{1} French Land Register data, which excludes lakes, ponds, glaciers > 1 km^{2} (0.386 sq mi or 247 acres) and river estuaries.

Schirrhoffen (French pronunciation: [ʃiʁofœn]; German: Schirrhofen) is a commune in the Bas-Rhin department in Grand Est in north-eastern France.

== See also ==
- Communes of the Bas-Rhin department
