= Joods Historisch Museum =

Joods Museum
- Joods Museum in 2026

- Location in the centre of Amsterdam
- Established: 24 February 1932
- Location: Nieuwe Amstelstraat 1 Amsterdam, Netherlands
- Coordinates: 52°22′1″N 4°54′14.5″E
- Type: History museum
- Website: www.jck.nl

The Joods Museum (Dutch pronunciation: [ˌjoːts ɦɪsˈtoːris myˈzeːjʏm]; English: Jewish Museum), part of the Jewish Cultural Quarter, is a museum in Amsterdam dedicated to Jewish history, culture and religion, in the Netherlands and worldwide. It is the only museum in the Netherlands dedicated to Jewish history.

== History ==
The Joods Museum opened its doors on 24 February 1932 and was initially housed at the Waag (Weighing House) on Nieuwmarkt square. Following the Nazi occupation of the Netherlands in World War II, the museum was forced to close and much of the collection was lost. The museum reopened its doors in 1955. In 1987, it moved to a new location, occupying four former synagogues on Jonas Daniel Meijerplein square, across the road from the Snoge or Portuguese Synagogue (for which joint tickets are sold).

The museum was recognized in 1989 when it received the Council of Europe Museum Prize, awarded for a combination of the presentation of the collection and the outward appearance of the buildings.

A seven-year renovation of the museum was completed in 2007.

== Collection and exhibitions ==
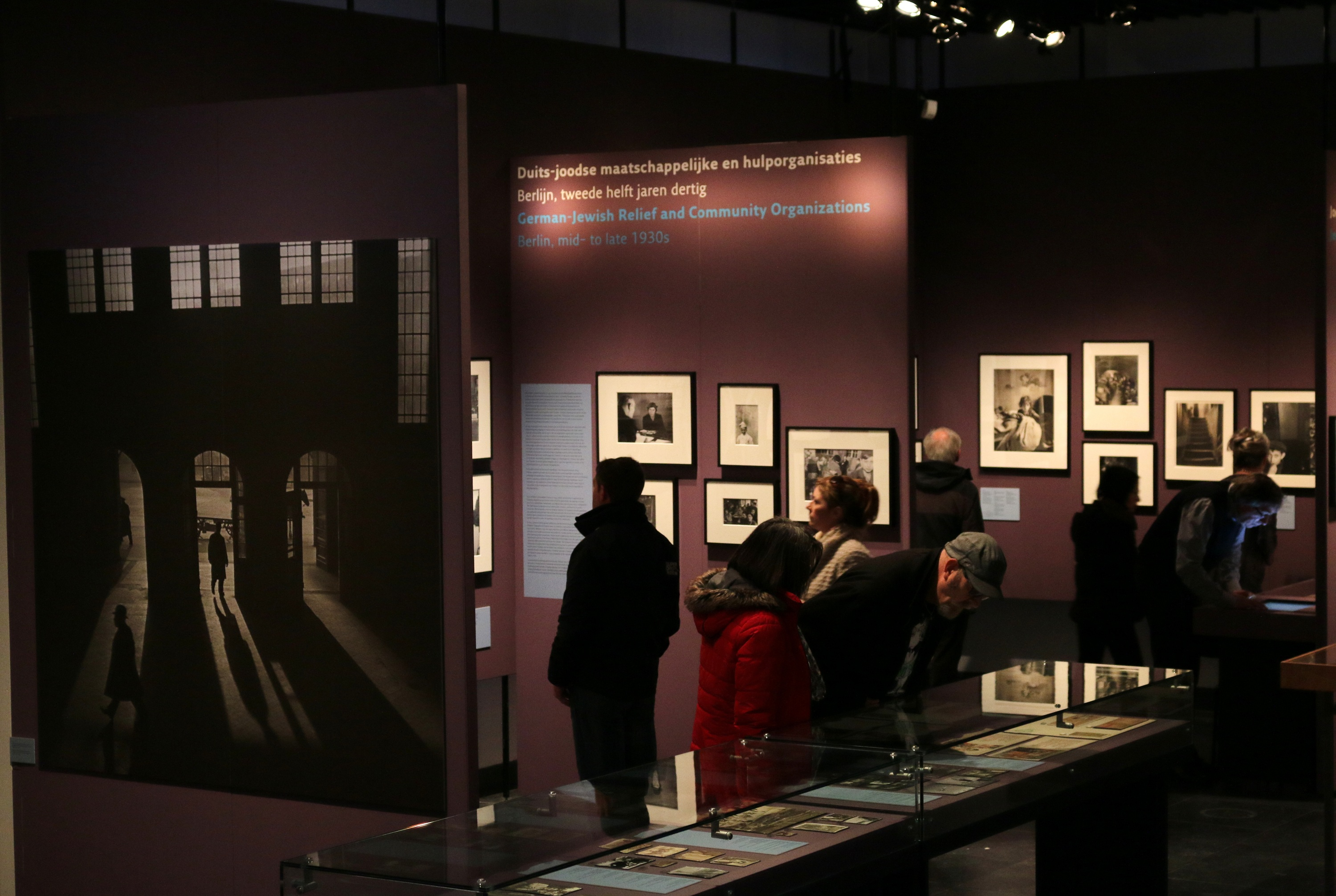
The exhibition of Roman Vishniac's photos at Amsterdam Jewish Historical Museum, 2014.

The museum's collection includes some 11,000 art objects, ceremonial objects and historical objects, only some five percent of which is on display at any one time. It has two permanent exhibitions as well as regularly changing temporary exhibitions. The exhibition on the ground floor focuses on Jewish traditions and customs. The presentation is inspired by the former interior of the synagogue. Ceremonial objects from the museum collection are shown in locations where they used to be placed in the synagogue. This gives visitors a sense of the surroundings in which they find themselves and enables them to taste the original synagogue atmosphere.

In 2014 the museum presented an exclusive exhibition of Roman Vishniac's photos. The photographer is famous for capturing the life of Jews during the world war.

The galleries of the Great Synagogue feature a new presentation on the history of the Jews of the Netherlands from 1600 to 1890. The central theme is what it meant to be a Jew in the Netherlands in this period. Stories about how Jews arrived in the Netherlands, the extent to which they managed to integrate, the cultural interchange with non-Jewish countrymen and the preservation of their identity resonate today in contemporary situations and debates.

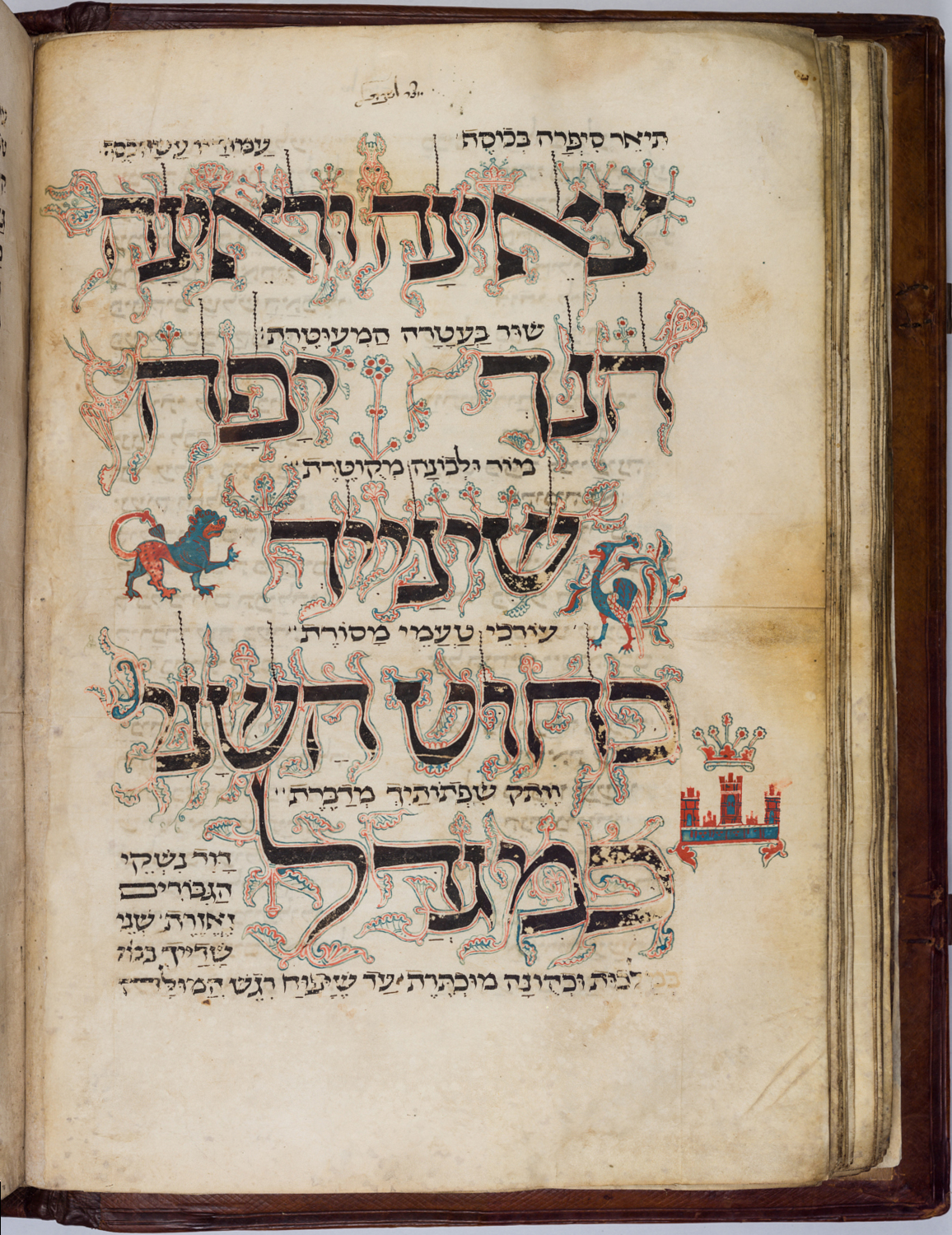
Amsterdam Machzor, written in Cologne c. 1250, is one of the earliest illuminated manuscripts of Ashkenazi origin.

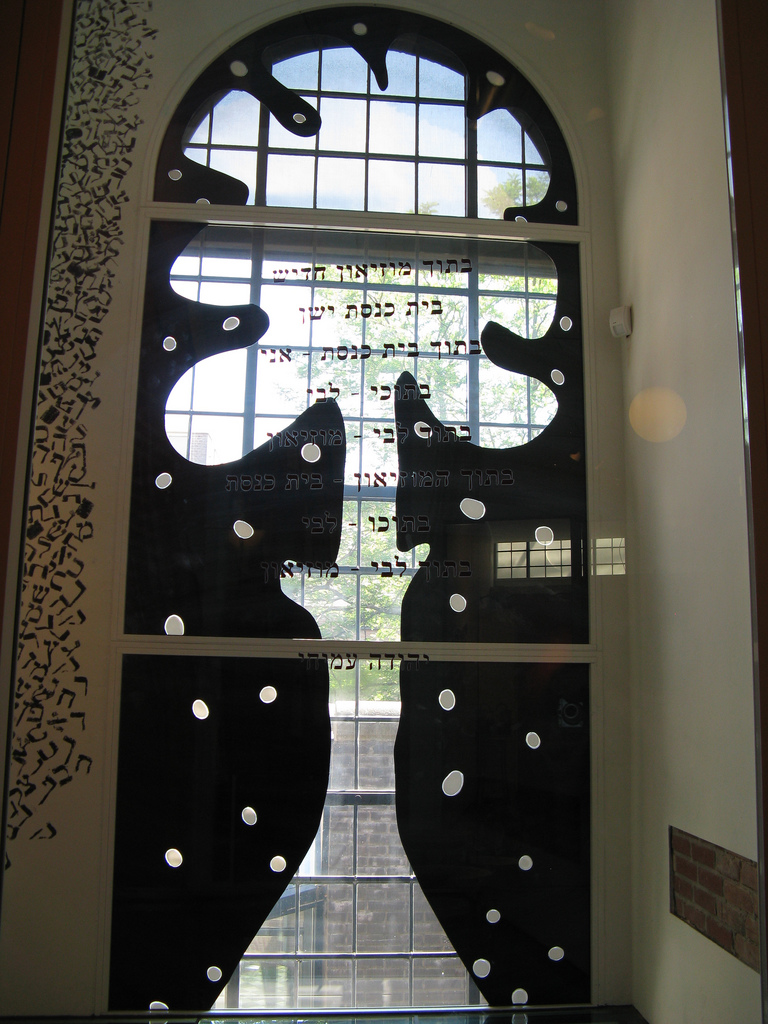
Tree of Life by Eli Content (1943), Hermine van Does (stained glass manufacturer)

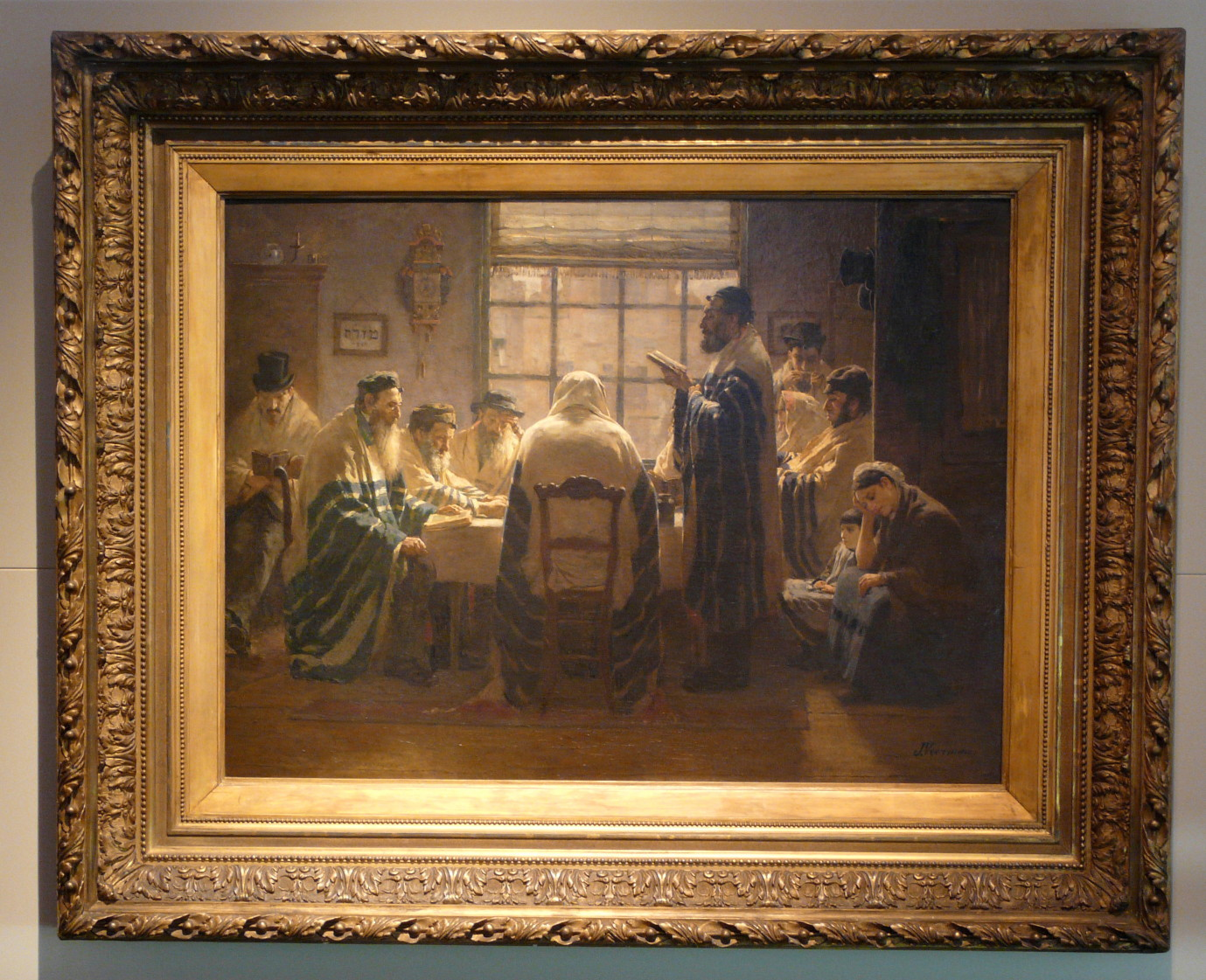
The mourning days by Jan Voerman (ca. 1884)

== See also ==
- History of the Jews in the Netherlands
