= Drecoll =

Drecoll (also known as House of Drecoll, Maison Drecoll, and CH. Drecoll) was a fashion house founded in Vienna in the 1880s by Christoph Drecoll. After changing ownership, Drecoll sold his name to the new buyers, and they opened a fashion house of the same name in Paris, in 1903. (Note: According to Vogue (1925), the signage appeared on the Paris fashion house building in 1900, while according to DK. Smithsonian (2012), the Paris fashion house opened in 1905.) Drecoll went through a merger in 1929 and closed in 1931 after another business change.

== Vienna ==
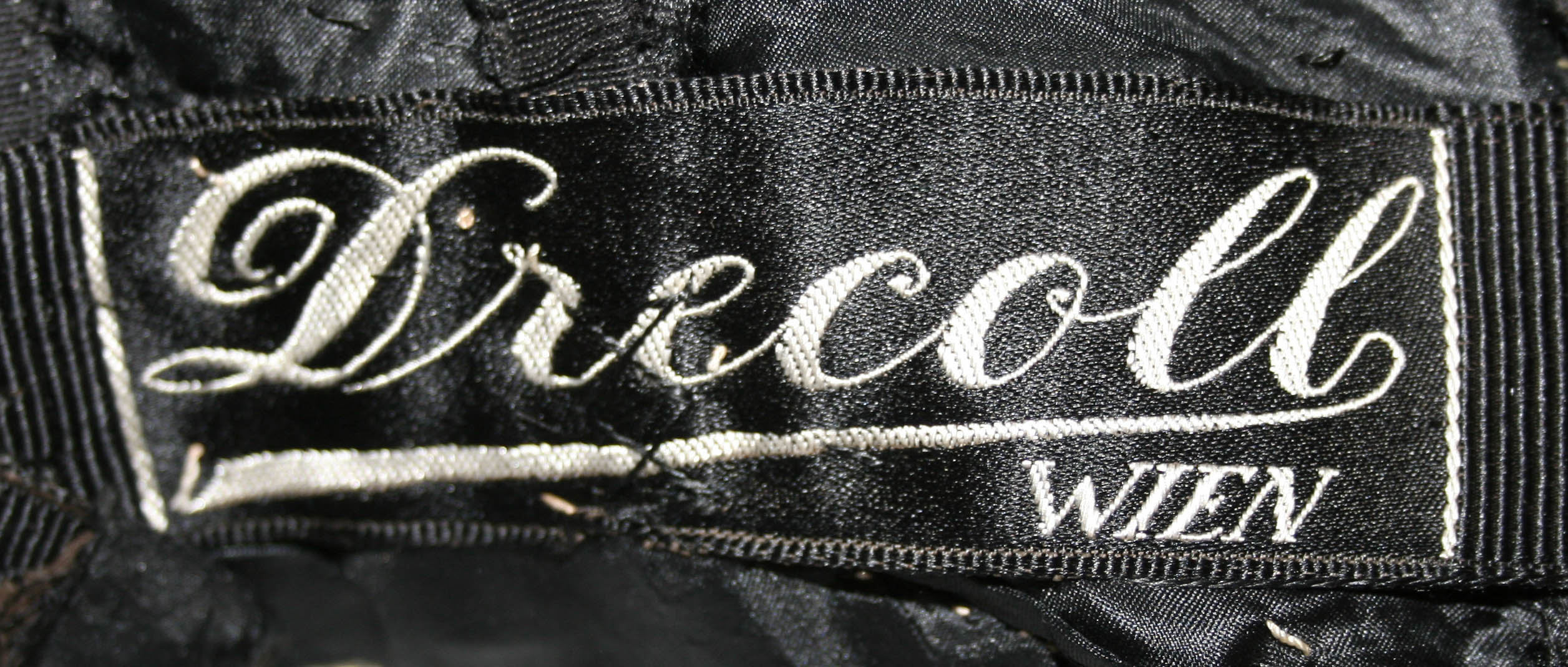
Drecoll label, Vienna, ca. 1890

Baron Christopher Drecoll (Johann Wilhelm Rudolf Christoph von Drecoll) was born in Hamburg, Germany, 21 November 1851. He opened a fashion house in Vienna, Austria in the 1880s. Baron Drecoll was a dressmaker whose house enjoyed the favour of the fashionable women of southeastern Europe and the Levant, upper-class Romanians and Serbians, rich Greeks, as well as the chic of Alexandria and Cairo, French cities both. In his employ was a young, ambitious, and talented Austrian couple, Pierre Basancon de Wagner (Swiss) and his wife, Marguerite van Speybrouck (Belgian) de Wagner. The couple had been dressmakers to the court of the Netherlands. Madame de Wagner was a designer, and monsieur handled house management. The Wagners foresaw the expansion of Paris dressmaking and Vienna steadily losing ground. Travel was becoming easier. Some of the best clients of the Vienna houses were beginning to make the journey to Paris to visit House of Worth and House of Paquin. They came to terms with Drecoll, and with at least two other partners, Sylvain Kahn (French) and Albert Sally Berg (German), and they bought his Vienna house outright, in 1895, and acquired his name for developing an establishment in Paris.

== Paris ==
=== Place de l'Opéra ===
In 1903, the new owners opened a fashion house in Paris, the sign reading, "CH. Drecoll". In the beginning, the French firm occupied No. 4 Place de l'Opéra, but owing to the increase of business, new premises had to be taken in the Boulevard des Capucines and Rue du Quatre-eptembre. These, together with the original building, formed a block.

In 1908, Kahn, Berg, and Wagner formed an English company under the name Ch. Drecoll Limited, having Monsieur and Madame de Wagner as directors.

The firm employed a staff of 150 whose work began at 9:00 or 9:30 AM, according to position held, and left at 6:30 PM, with an hour's interval for lunch. There were also 500 workwomen whose houses were open from 9:00 AM to 7:00 PM, with an hour for lunch. On Saturday afternoon, the premises were closed. The staff was fed by the firm in special refectories, and a canteen was arranged for the workwomen where they could buy their entire lunch or else supplement the lunch that they brought from home.

The models, which at the beginning were made by Madame de Wagner, were later made in collaboration with Mlle. Madeleine. They were shown to the buyers about August 15 for the winter season, and towards February 15 for the summer season. Between seasons, models were made as required. The House of Drecoll had always tried to dress its clients without eccentricity, and the outlines were specially studied to give to the models that was characterized as chic and simple.

In Berlin, some years after Baron Drecoll sold his fashion house, he sought to test the validity of the de Wagners's contract. He set up an establishment in Paris under his own name, to be met promptly with legal action, out of which the de Wagners were victorious. Baron Drecoll retired again to Berlin. He died in Lobetal, Germany, on 17 November 1939.

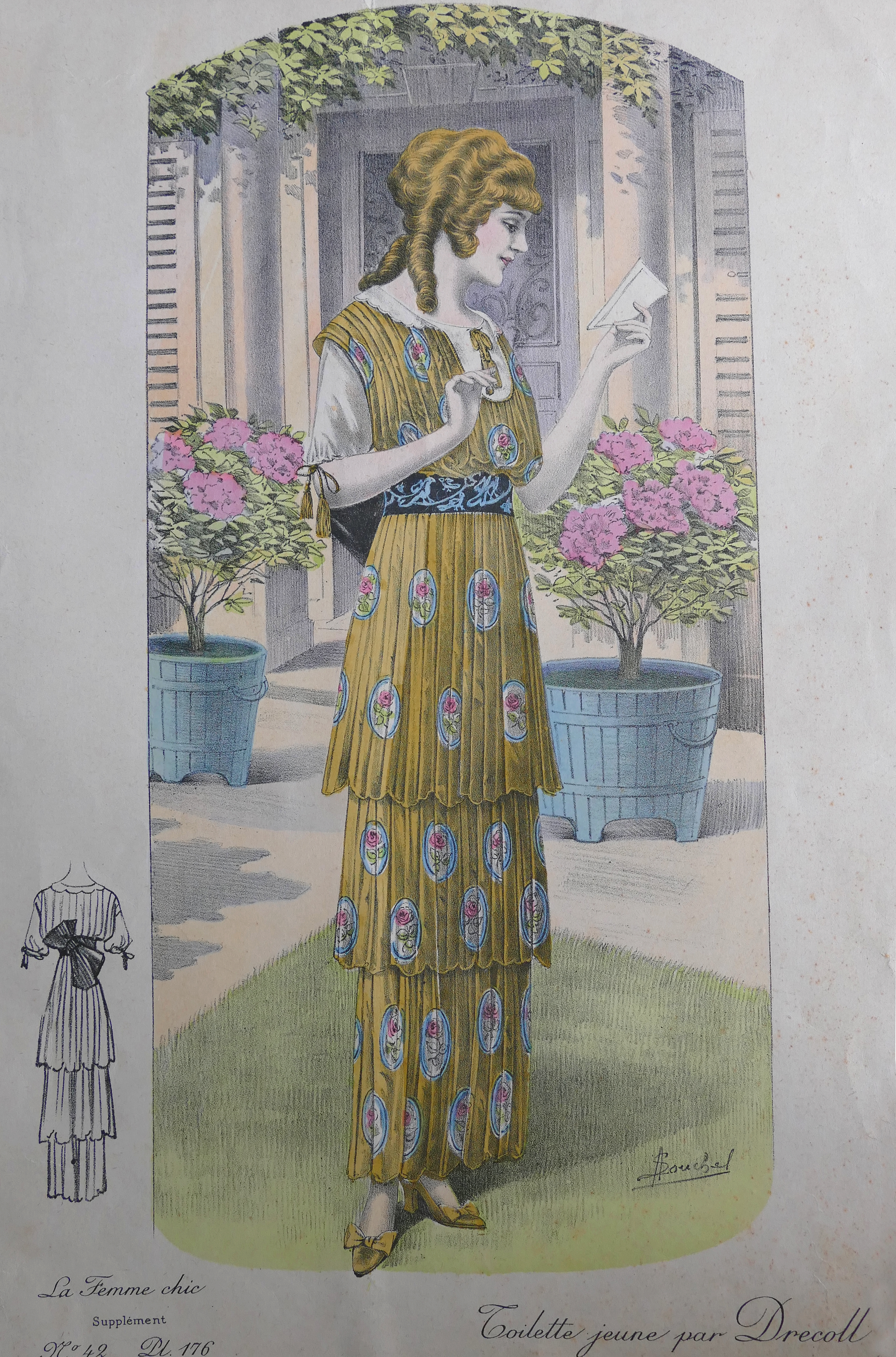
Drecoll design, 1914

Those who succeeded the de Wagners were Mademoiselle Madeleine and Monsieur Edmond Courtot, and their heading of this house was the realization of old ambition. In the background, serving as administrator for Drecoll, Ltd., was Monsieur Besançon de Wagner, son-in-law of the founders, who themselves came in occasionally from the country to watch the progress of the new management. Courtot worked with Drecoll as a boy. After a few years, he had shown such aptitude that he was being groomed to succeed Monsieur de Wagner in business management. By that time, Mademoiselle Madeleine had joined Drecoll. Before World War I, she had been a designer with Paquin and Callot. The plan then was that the de Wagners should step out and give control to Mademoiselle Madeleine and Monsieur Courtot, about 1915.

The War, upset things. Courtot went away with his regiment. As the years passed, Mademoiselle Madeleine grew impatient. Her cousin, widely known in Paris dressmaking as Madame Madeleine-was a successful vendeuse. The pair decided to go into business together. Just after the Armistice, they opened on the Champs-Elysées as Madeleine et Madeleine. But the two cousins decided to separate, so Mlle. Madeleine went back to Drecoll. Meanwhile Courtot had also returned, and the old plan of succession was revived.

==== Architecture and fittings ====
There were four large salons, twelve trying-on rooms, and a "salon de lumière", a very well-lit room, for the trying on of evening robes. The other branches included: stockrooms for dress materials, embroideries, and silks; cash and bookkeeping departments; a packing department; a fur atelier; three ateliers for tailor-mades; a lingerie atelier; and a dozen ateliers for robes and mantles.

=== Champs-Elysées ===
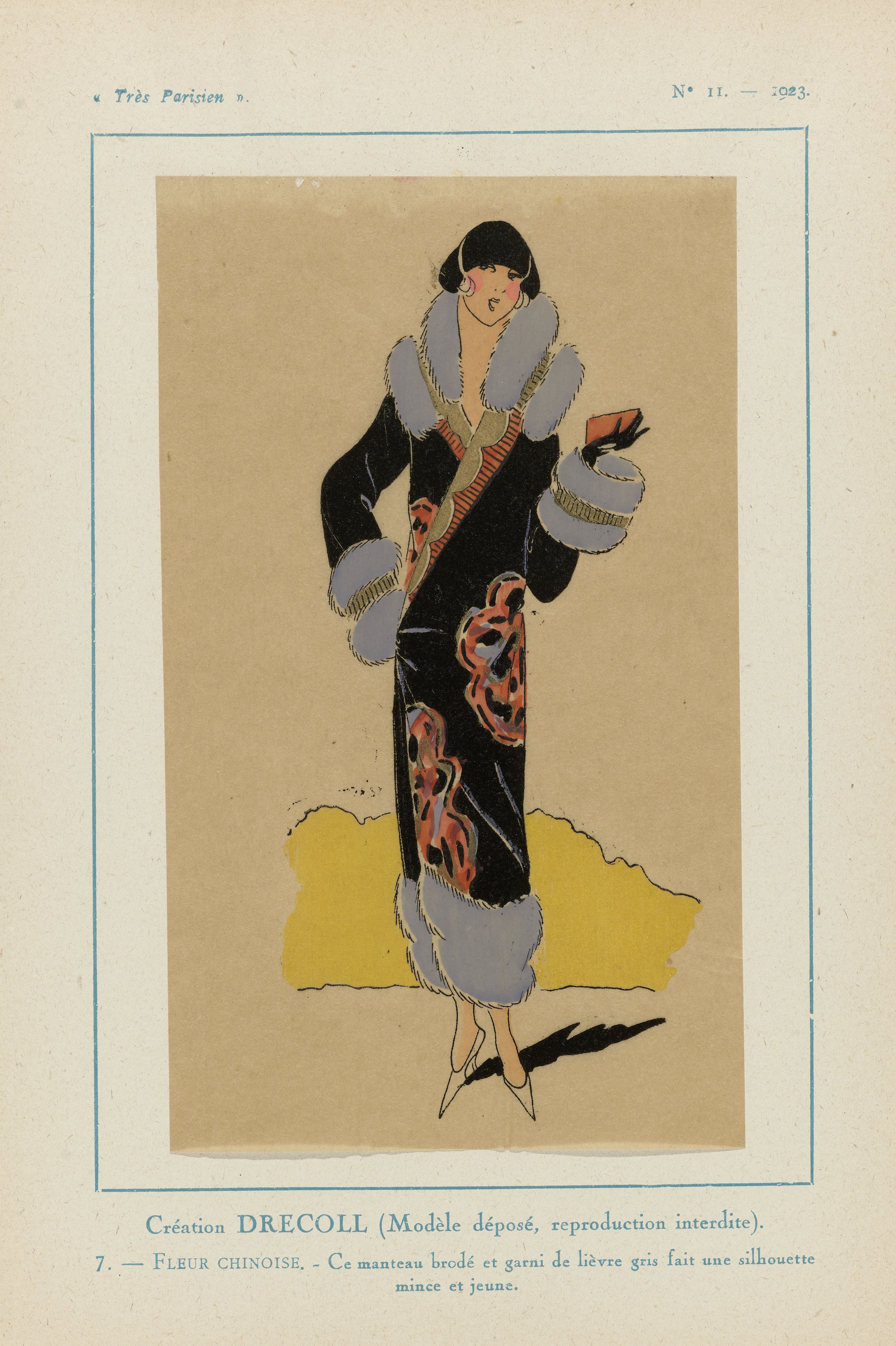
Drecoll design, 1923

In 1923, the French fashion house joined the westward drift of the dressmakers, abandoning its historic location in the Place de l'Opéra and occupying new quarters on the Champs-Elysées.

The de Wagners remained only long enough to get things running smoothly in the new premises, Mlle. Madeleine having been taken as joint director. The de Wagners retired in 1925. In the same year, Drecoll perfume was exhibited at the Canadian National Show.

==== Architecture and fittings ====
The new setting was almost too gorgeous for its purpose, gowns on display needing a quieter frame. The original structure was the Second Empire Hôtel of the rich Madame de Bestegui; and, though the de Wagners almost completely rebuilt it, they could not bring themselves to destroy the sumptuous mural decorations of the chief rooms.

Beyond a heavy glass and iron door, to the right, was a comfortable rendezvous room with chairs and deep windows; straight ahead, an austere foyer of stone with a berugged pavement, two ornamental trees in tubs, and a Louis Quatorze commode with swelling mahogany front supporting a single Chinese vase against a background of Gobelin fabric which shielded a cream-coloured rectangle of wall marble. From the foyer mounted the broad staircase with its specially designed balustrade of black iron, the steps covered with a strip of Persian carpet. Turning at the broad landing, at the top, was a reception room, another place of rugs, tapestries and hidden lights. In the grand salon, the rugs disappeared, and the room was carpeted in plain velvet from wall to wall, Paris dressmaking opinion having been almost unanimous that the showroom should be simply a neutral frame for the rainbow hues of the merchandise. This grand salon was the place where mannequins paraded and clients watched, and no aggressive colors were wanted. Yet it was luxurious, this great room stretching along the whole front of the building, adorned in gray and gold and crystal. The thick windows deadened the diapason of the avenue's traffic, and the atmosphere was that of the orchid house. On the ceiling alone, the decorators employed a free hand, their brushes having painted an azure firmament in which floated pink cupids and roses.

The mannequins' quarters resembled a chorus line's dressing room, with mirrors down one side of the room and low tables and chairs in front of them. From here, there was an avenue of small mirrored fitting rooms-the salles d'essayage, as they are called-the doors of which faced the windows along one side of the building. The roofs of the fitting rooms formed a mezzanine whereon Drecoll's chief executives had their desks. The outer panels of the fitting room doors were mirrors, so that the client could walk up and down the corridor and see the effect of a new gown in motion. Farther on was a fitting room for actresses. Its distinguishing feature was its miniature stage, the back drop of which was a mirror framed in strong lights hooded so that their rays did not fall on the glass. These could be switched on to enable the actor to see how her gown was going to look across the footlights. Behind the public rooms were fifteen or more new and scientifically constructed floors crowded with ateliers, stockrooms, delivery rooms, rest rooms, emergency hospital, restaurants, kitchens, and all the other equipment of a Paris dress house of the first order.

== Mergers and closure ==
In 1928, financier Georges Aubert merged Drecoll with House of Beer forming Drecoll-Beer or Beer-Drecoll. The following year, Maggy Rouff, the de Wagner's daughter-in-law, took over the business.

The Drecoll fashion house ended in 1931, Beer-Drecoll and Maison Agnes having merged to form Agnes-Drecoll (1931-1963).
