= 1910s in Western fashion =

The 1910s in Western fashion encompasses styles from 1910 to 1919. Western fashion in this period carries influences from oriental and neoclassical inspirations as well as the subsequent effects of World War I. Over the decade, Women's fashion experienced a shift from the 1900s and early 1910s floor-length dresses and skirts towards shorter hemlines and dropped waistlines in addition to the more practical garments necessitated by the war. In men's fashion, evening wear largely continued to adhere to previous conventions while trends in informal outerwear continued to evolve. During the period, shifts in fashion made way for styles associated with the Jazz Age of the 1920s.

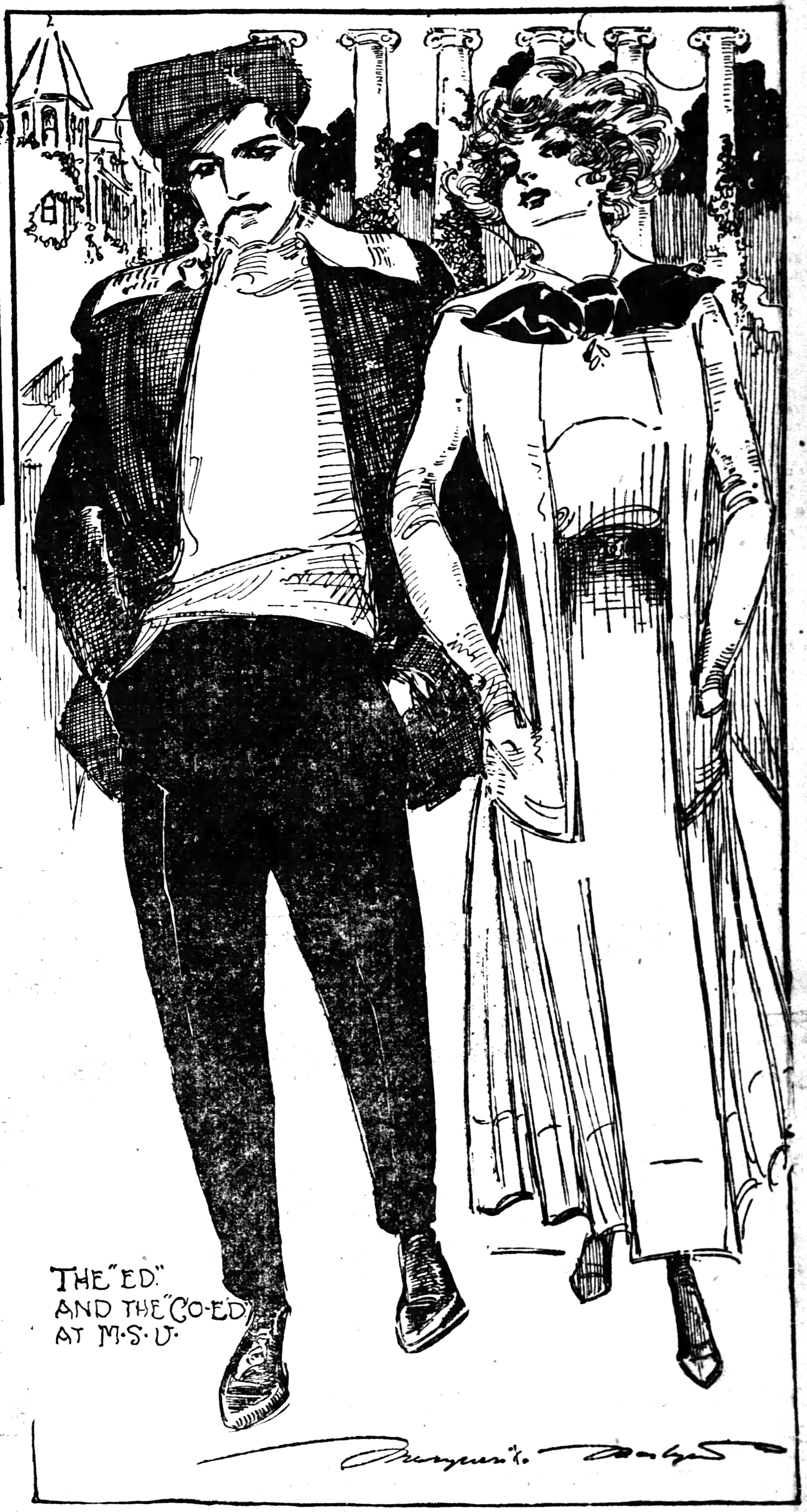
In 1910, journalist Marguerite Martyn visited the Missouri State University (now University of Missouri) campus in Columbia and sketched these two fashionable students.

== Women's fashion ==
=== Empire revival and oriental opulence ===
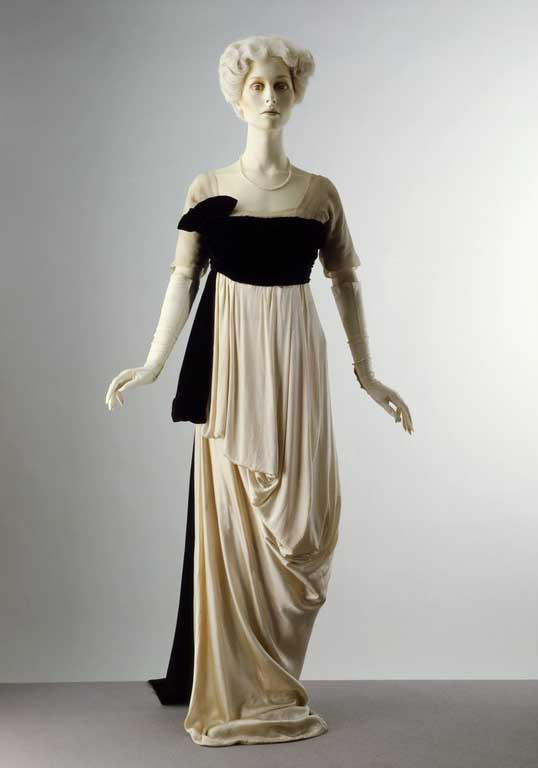
Dinner dress, designed about 1912 by Lucile (1863–1935)

During the early years of the 1910s the fashionable silhouette became much more lithe, fluid and soft than in the 1900s. Public interest in all things "oriental", in combination with neoclassical inspiration from the Empire or Directoire style of the early 19th century, were the major influences of the decade on women's fashions. The Art Deco movement began to emerge and its influence was also evident in the designs of many couturiers of the time.

The Empire-style revival was first seen in Paul Poiret couture collections of the late 1900s, an example being his iconic "Josephine" evening dress, created in 1907. When the Ballets Russes performed Scheherazade in Paris in 1910, a mania for Orientalism ensued. Eastern influences melded with the revival of Directoire style. As an art practitioner with an Orientalist bent, couturier Paul Poiret was one of the first designers to translate this vogue into a fashion trend. Poiret's clients were dressed in flowing pantaloons, turbans, and garments of vivid colors or in geisha-style kimonos.

Two influential fashion designers of the time were Jacques Doucet and Mariano Fortuny. The French designer Doucet specialised in superimposing pastel colors; his elaborate, gossamer-light dresses suggested the Impressionist shimmers of reflected light. His fluid lines and flimsy, diaphanous materials met with sustained success.

The Venice-based designer Mariano Fortuny y Madrazo employed innovative techniques and piloted new approaches. For his dress designs he conceived a special pleating process and new dyeing techniques. He patented his process in Paris on 4 November 1910. He gave the name Delphos to his long, clinging sheath dresses that undulated with color, so called because it emulated the dress of the bronze statue of the Charioteer of Delphi. Each garment was made of a single piece of the finest silk, its unique color acquired by repeated immersions in dyes whose shades were suggestive of moonlight or of the watery reflections of the Venetian lagoon. Breton straw, Mexican cochineal, and indigo from the Far East, were among the ingredients that Fortuny used. Among his many devotees were Eleonora Duse, Isadora Duncan, Cléo de Mérode, the Marchesa Casati, Émilienne d'Alençon, and Liane de Pougy.

During this period, the first prominent female couturier, Jeanne Paquin, was the first to promote her couture by using mannequins to display her designs at prestigious public events, such as the racing at Longchamp and Chantilly. Paquin was also the first Parisian couturier to open foreign branches in London, Buenos Aires, and Madrid.

=== Tunics and hobble skirts ===
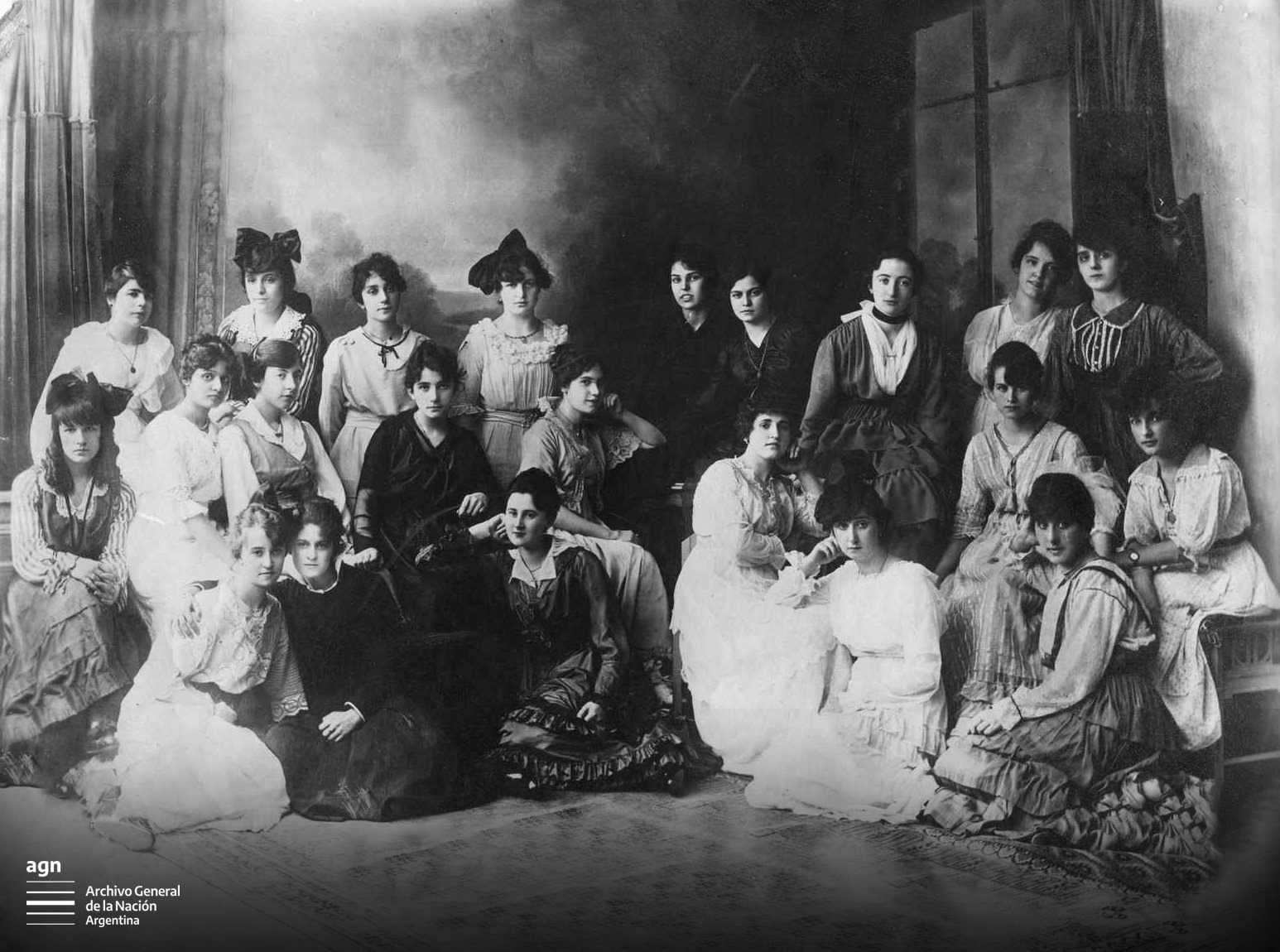
A group of newly graduated teachers from Buenos Aires in 1916.

Couturier designs came in a variety of shapes, but the most popular silhouette throughout the decade was the tunic over a long underskirt. Full, hip-length "lampshade" tunics were worn over narrow, draped skirts. By 1914, skirts were widest at the hips and very narrow at the ankle. These hobble skirts made long strides impossible. Tunics became longer and underskirts fuller and shorter. By 1916 women were wearing calf-length dresses.

Early in the period, waistlines were high (just below the bust), echoing the Empire style (or Directoire) of the early 19th century. The waists were loose and softly defined. Gradually, they dropped to near the natural waist by mid-decade, where they were to remain through the war years. When the Paris fashion houses reopened after the war, styles for 1919 showed a lowered and even more undefined waist.

=== Suits and coats ===
The tailleur or tailored suit of matching jacket and skirt was worn in the city and for travel. Jackets followed the lines of tunics, with raised, lightly defined waists. Fashionable women of means wore striking hats and fur stole or scarves with their tailleurs, and carried huge matching muffs.

Most coats were cocoon or kimono shaped, wide through the shoulders and narrower at the hem. Fur coats were popular.

=== World War I ===
Changed dresses during World War I were dictated more by necessity than by fashion. As more and more women entered the workforce, they demanded clothes that were better suited to their new activities; these derived from the shirtwaists and tailored suits. Social events were postponed in favor of more pressing engagements and the need to mourn the increasing numbers of dead, visits to the wounded, and the general gravity of the time meant that darker colors and simpler cuts became the norm. A new monochrome look emerged that was unfamiliar to young women in comfortable circumstances. Women dropped the cumbersome underskirts from their tunic-and-skirt ensembles, simplifying dress and shortening skirts in one step. By 1915, the Gazette du Bon Ton was showing full skirts with hemlines at calf length. These were called the "war crinoline" by the fashion press, who promoted the style as "patriotic" and "practical".

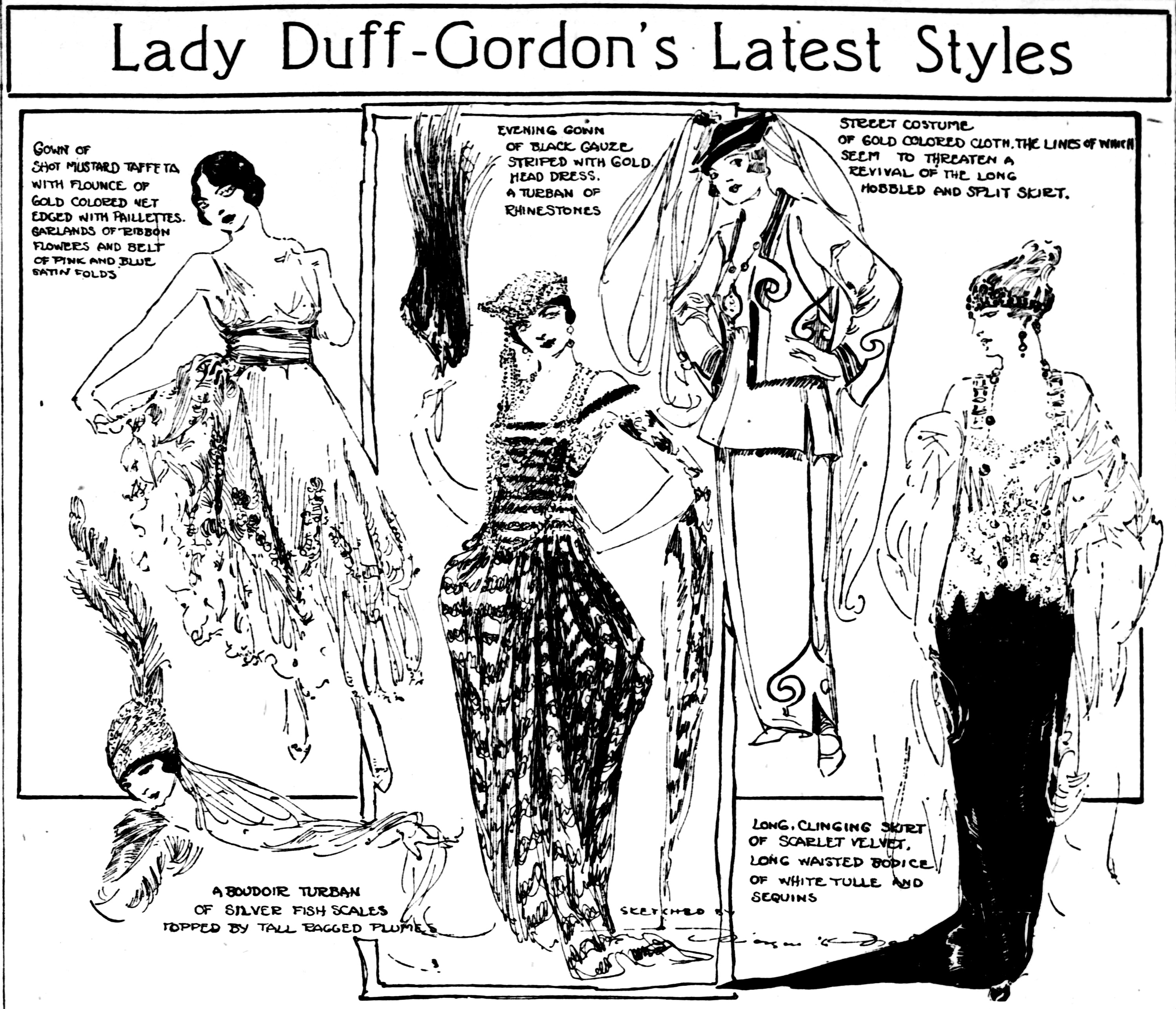
Styles of "Lucile" (Lucy, Lady Duff-Gordon), as presented in a vaudeville circuit pantomime and sketched by Marguerite Martyn of the St. Louis Post-Dispatch in April 1918

People were also dressing less extravagantly due to funds being put toward the war effort. According to Eileen Collard, Coco Chanel took notice of this and introduced costume jewelry. She replaced expensive necklaces with glass or crystal beads. "Without grading them to size, she mixed pearls with other beads to fashion original jewelry to be worn with her designs" that were inspired by women joining the workforce.

=== Footwear ===
Shoes had high, slightly curved heels. Shorter skirts put an emphasis on stockings, and gaiters were worn with streetwear in winter. "Tango shoes" inspired by the dance craze had criss-crossing straps at the ankles that peeked out from draped and wrapped evening skirts.

During the war years, working women wore sensible laced shoes with round toes and lower wedge heels.

=== Hairstyles and hats ===
Summer hats in 1918.

Simple felt hats, turbans, and clouds of tulle replaced the styles of headgear popular in the preceding decade. Large hats with wide brims and broad hats with face-shadowing brims were the height of fashion in the early years of the decade, gradually shrinking to smaller hats with flat brims. Short, bobbed hair – the "bob cut" – was introduced to Paris fashion in 1909 and spread to avant-garde circles in England during the war. Dancer, silent film actress and fashion trendsetter Irene Castle helped spread the fashion for short hairstyles in America. Hair, even short hair, was frequently supplemented with postiches, small individual wigs, curls, or false buns which were incorporated into the hairstyle.

=== The corset ===
As women began to become more active with dance and sport, they started to remove their corsets at parties in order to move more freely. In response corset manufacturers marketed the dance corset, which was less constricting, lighter, and more flexible. This shift made it a necessity to own more corsets because they served different functions. At the same time women now had more agency to decide their own shapes with the variety of corsets available.

=== Style gallery 1910–1913 ===
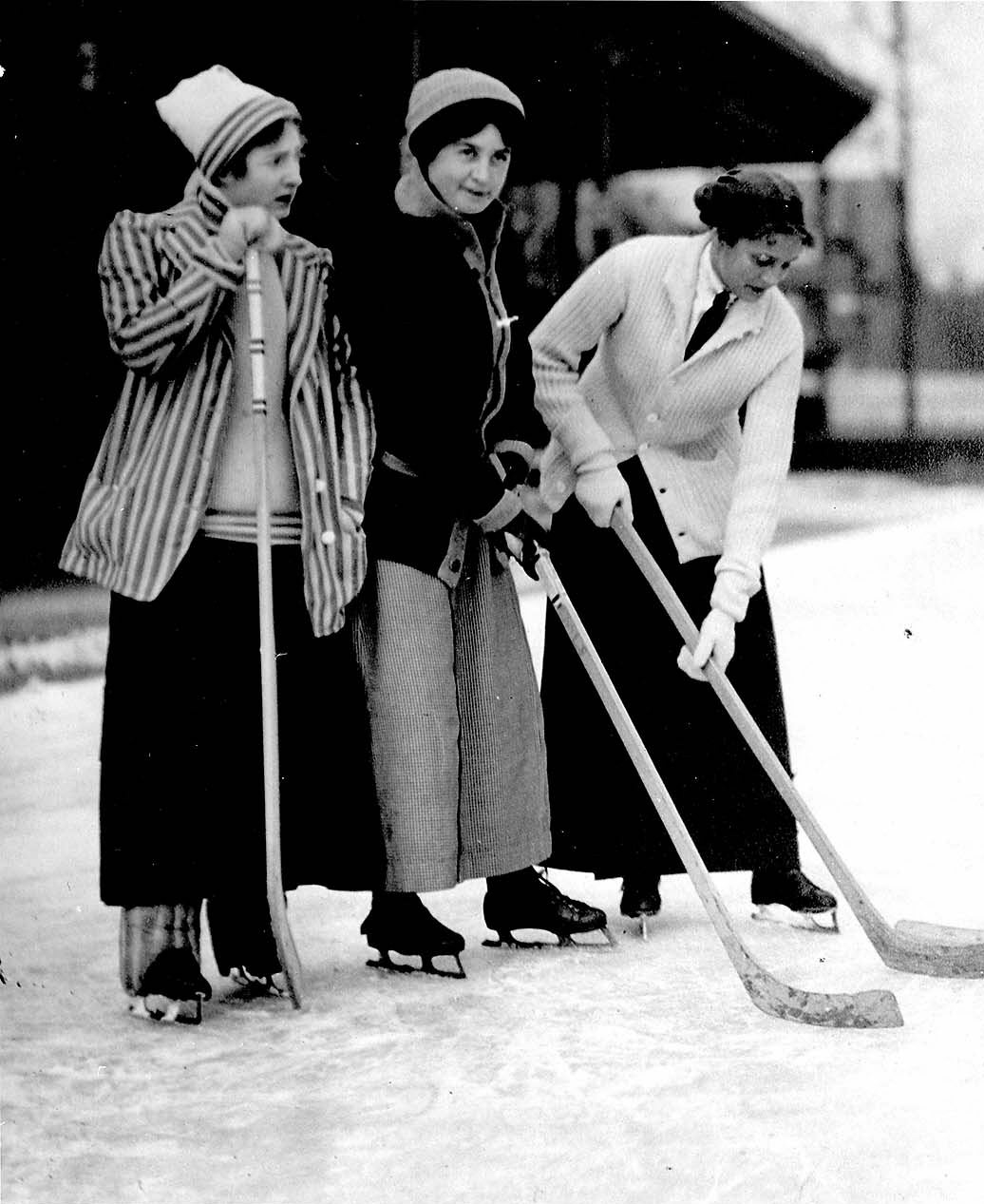
1 – c. 1910

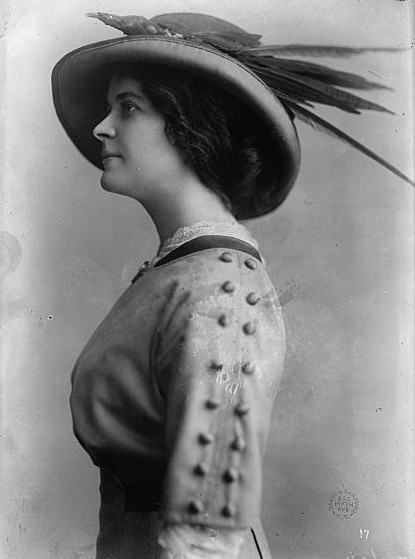
2 – 1910

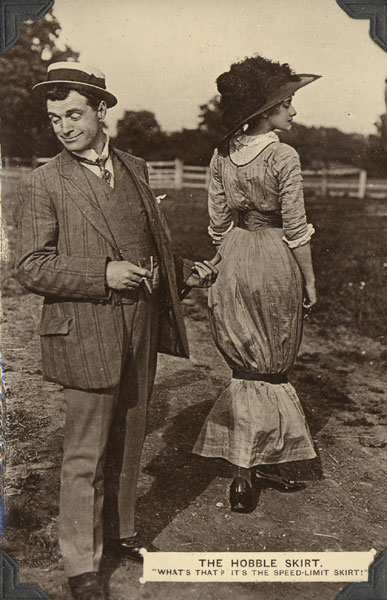
3 – c. 1911

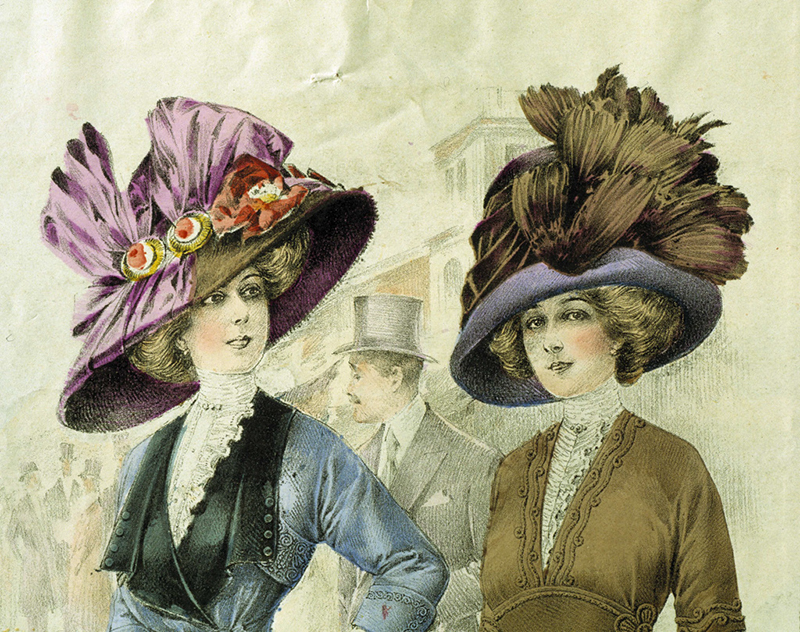
4 - 1911

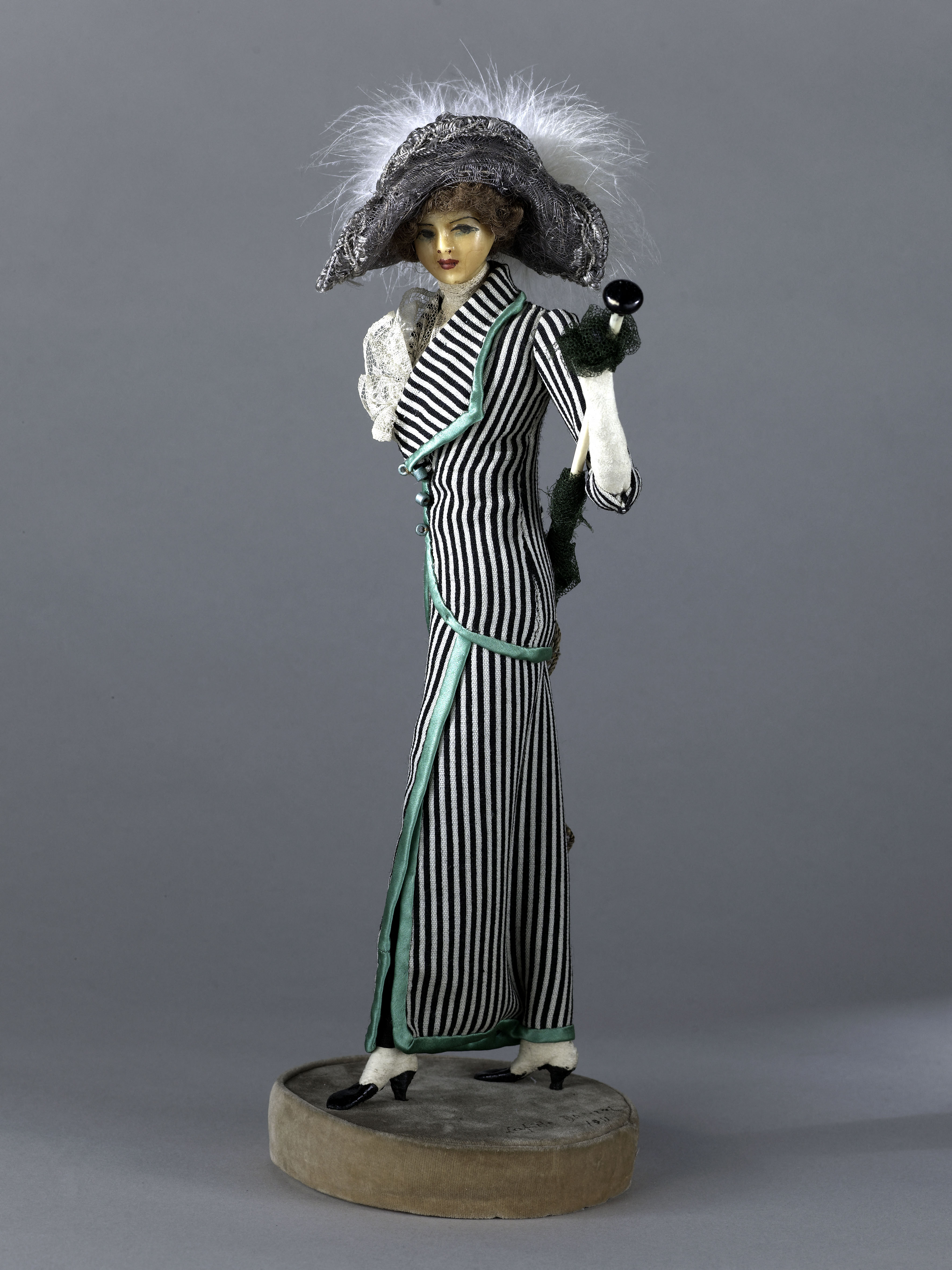
5 – 1911

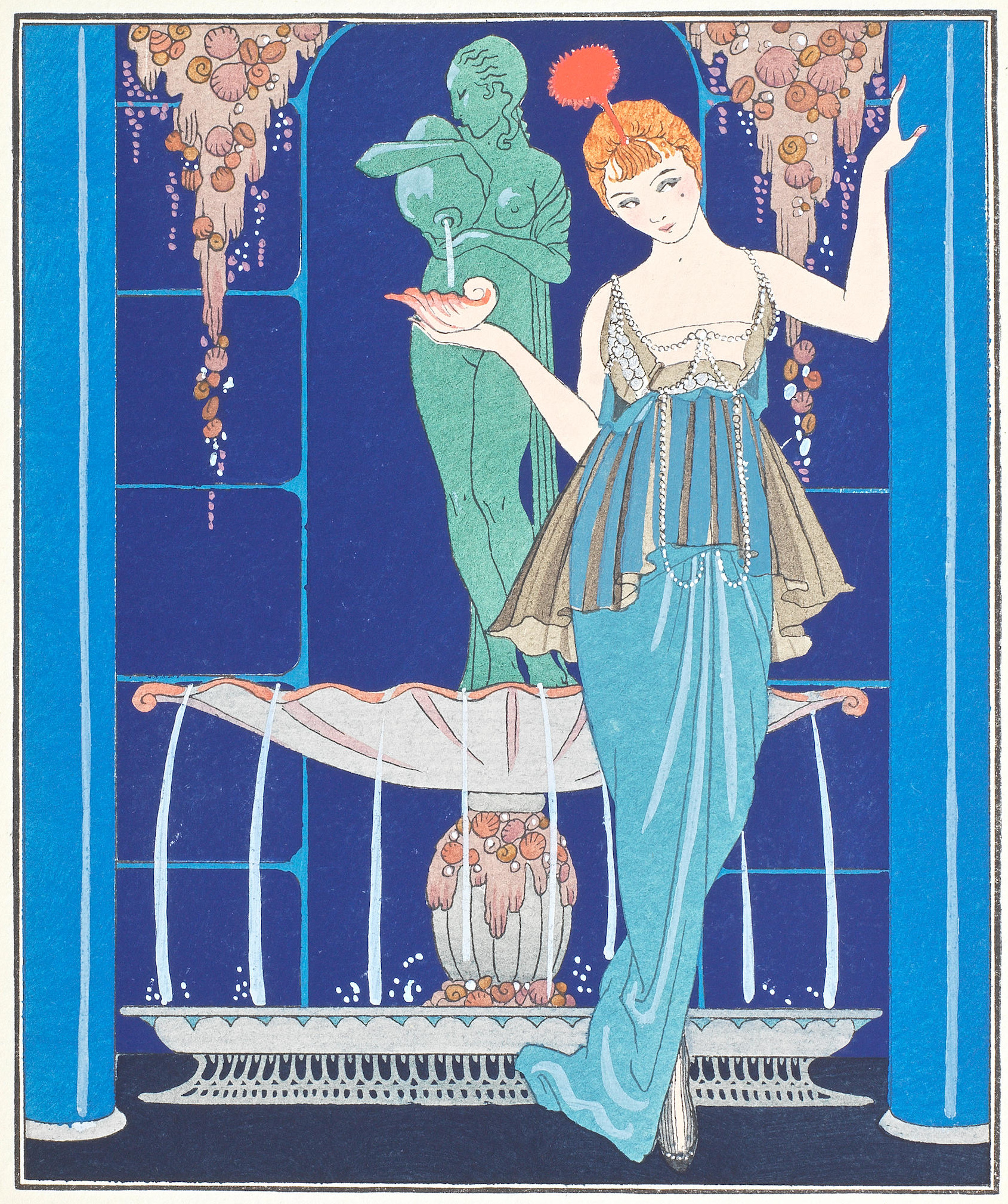
6 – 1912

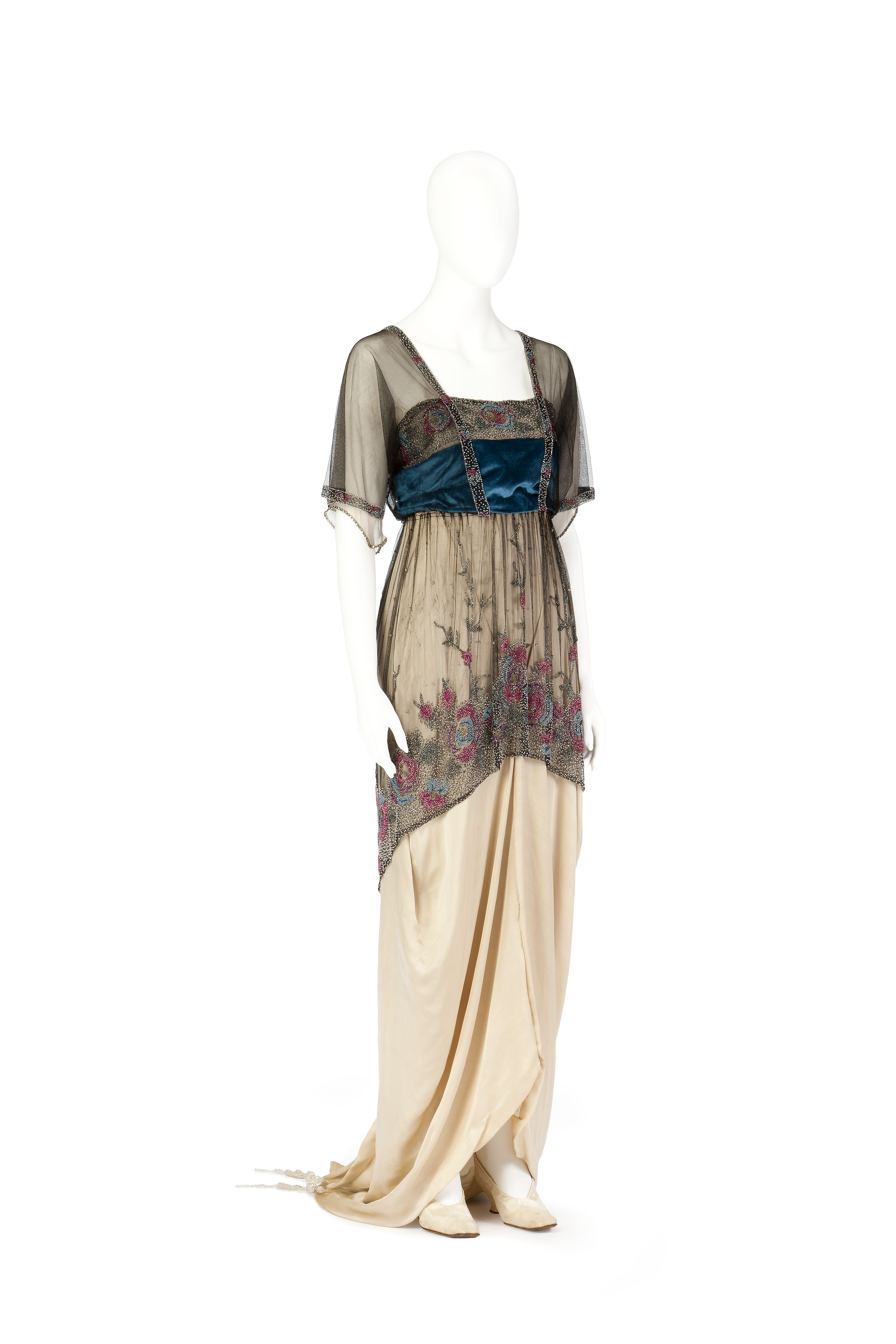
7 – ca 1912

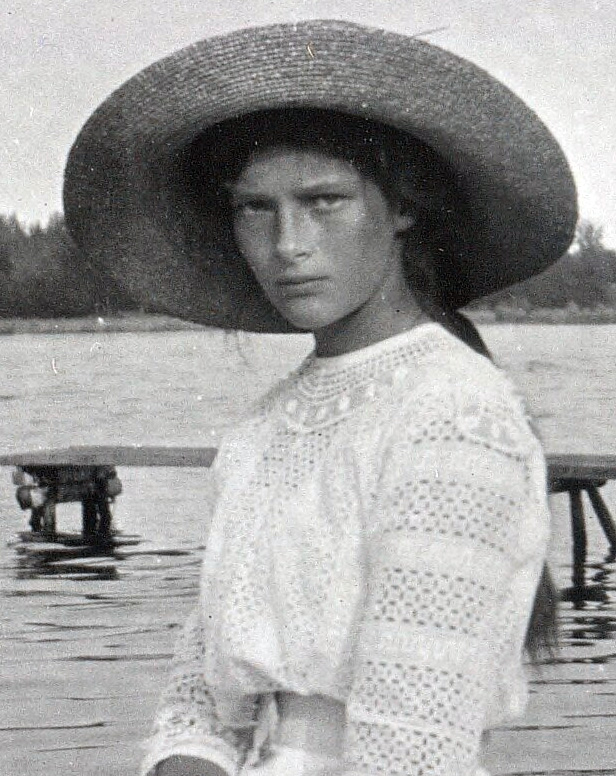
8 – 1912

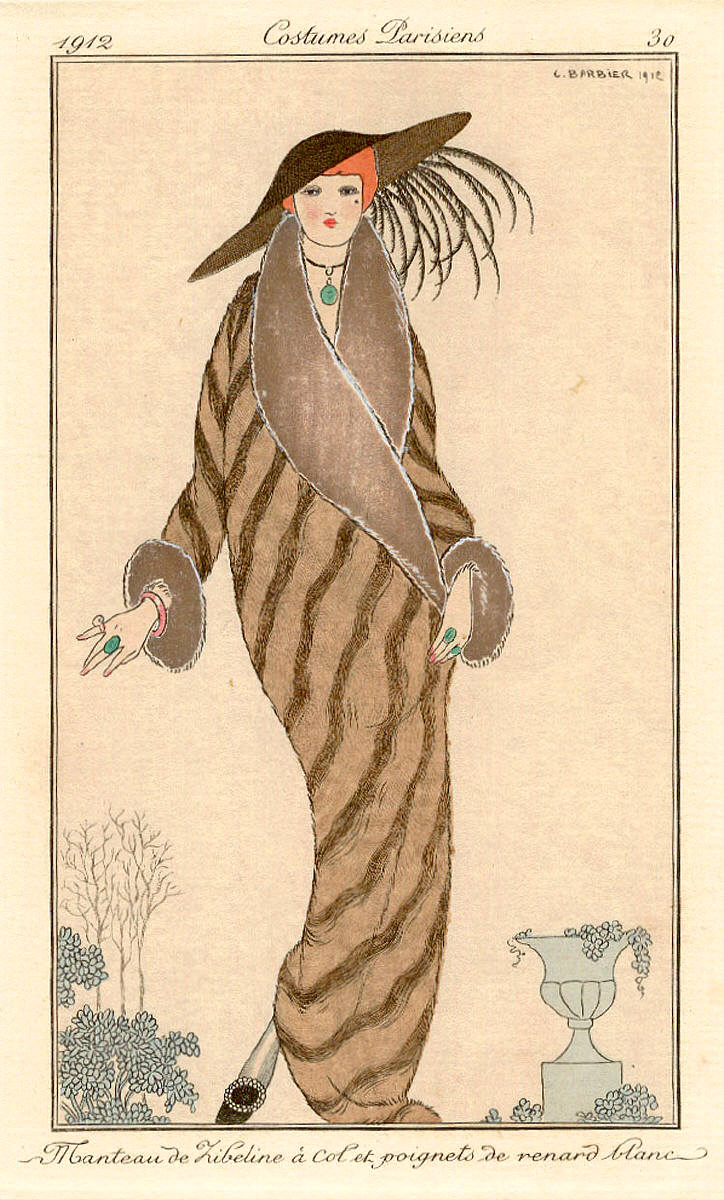
9 – 1912

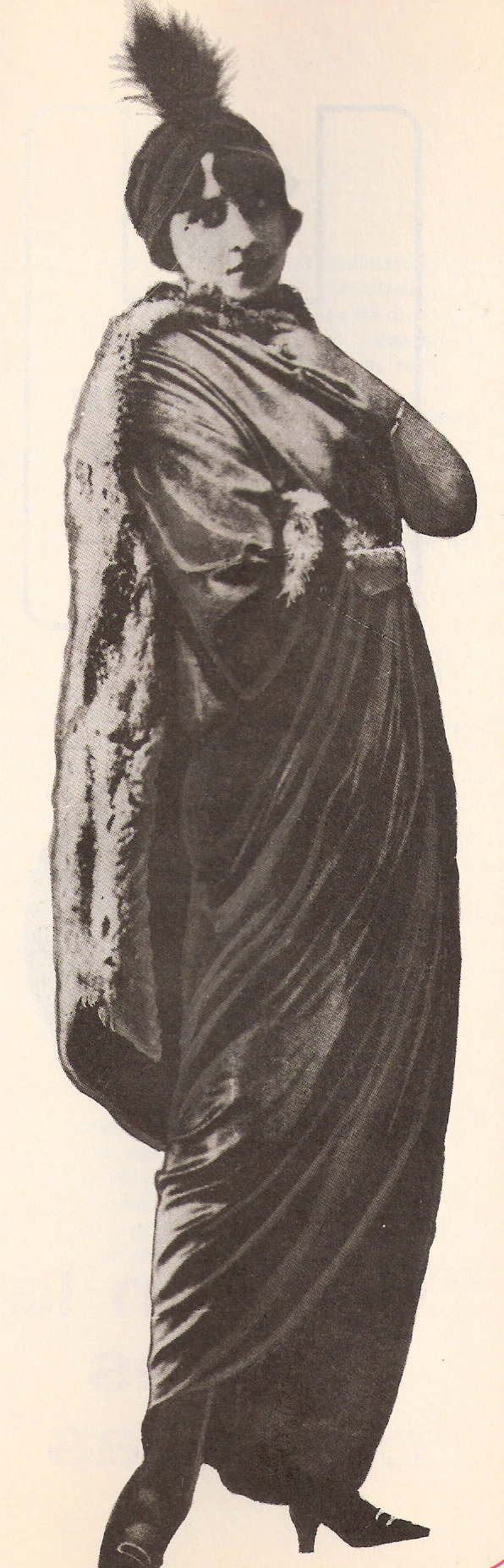
10– 1912

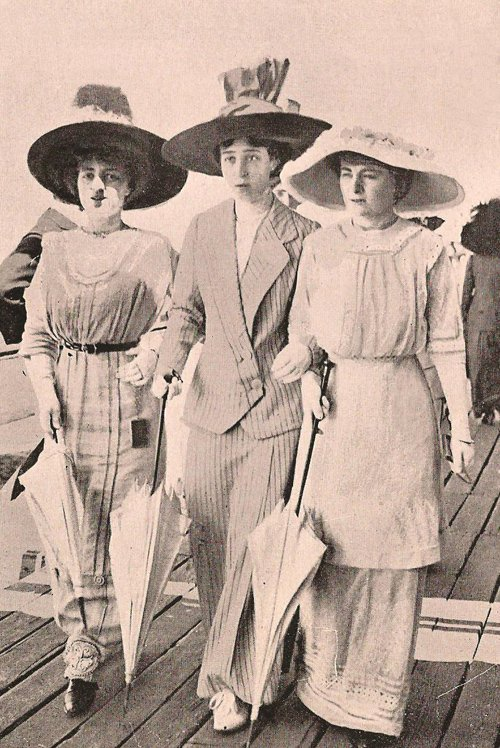
11 – 1913

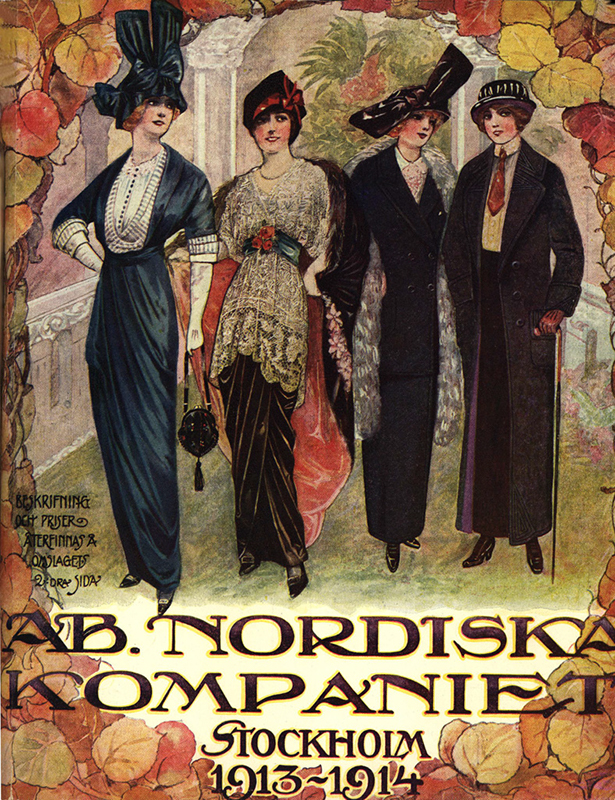
12 - 1913

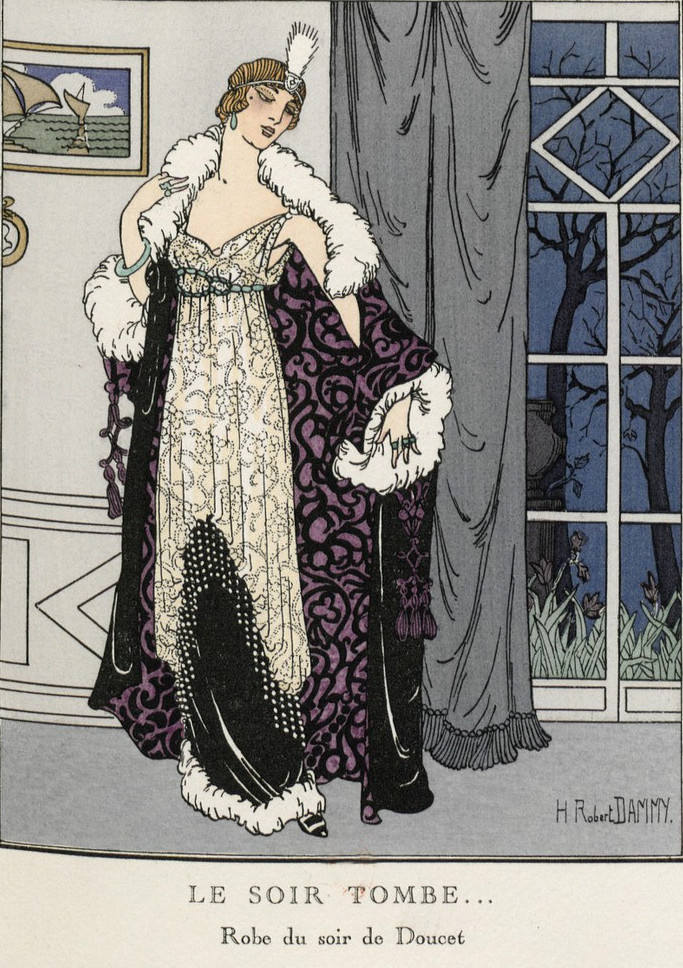
13 – 1913

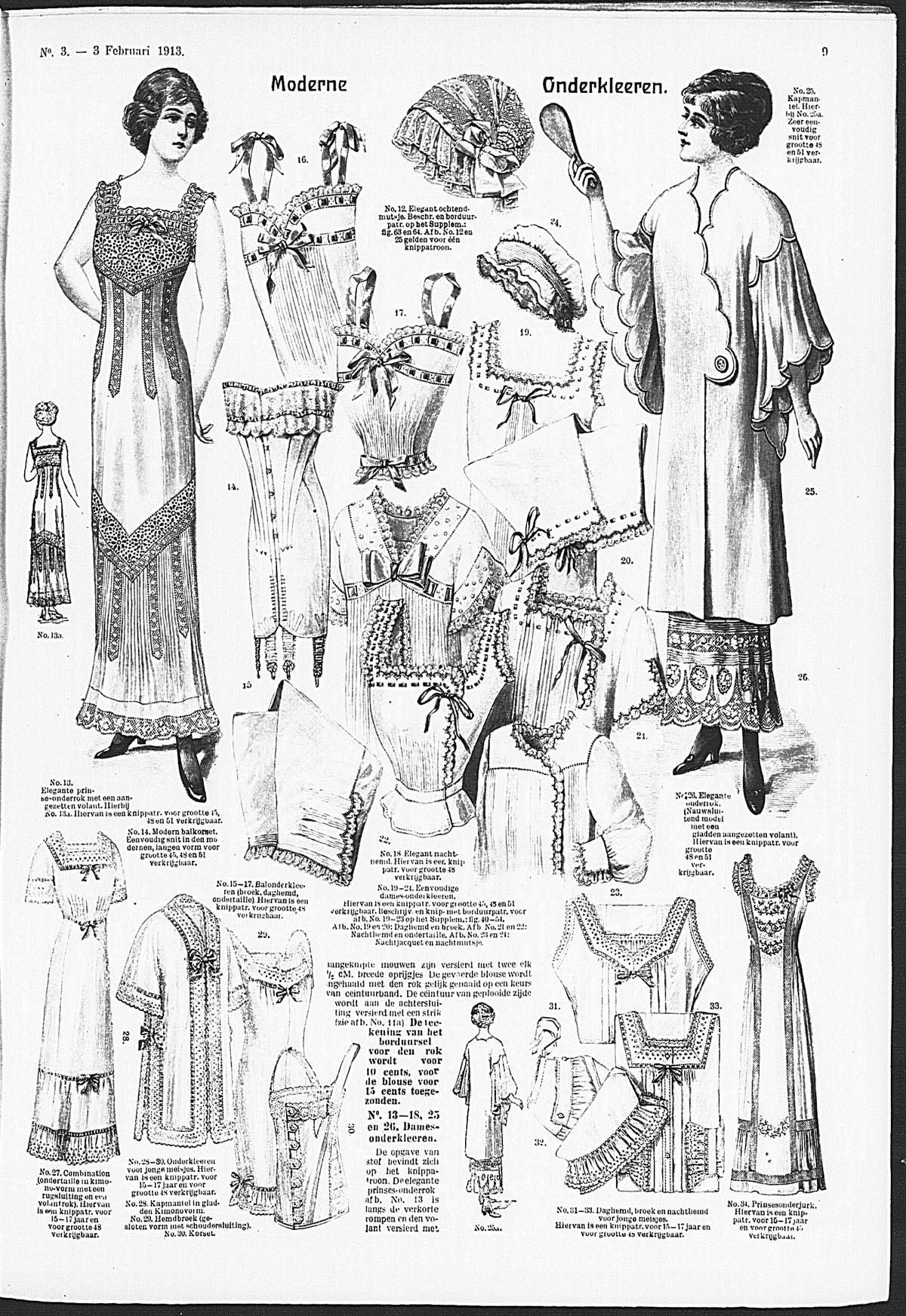
14 – 1913
1. Women playing hockey, Toronto, c. 1910
2. Large feathered hat of 1910
3. Postcard showing a hobble skirt, c. 1911
4. Fashion poster with 1911 hats
5. Fashion doll wearing an ankle-length straight-skirt suit, fitted jacket with lapel collar and 3/4-length sleeves, ruffled blouse, wearing a wide-brimmed hat and spats
6. Gown by Jeanne Paquin from La Gazette du Bon Ton 1912
7. Parisian Dinner Dress owned by Ellen Roosval von Hallwyl ca 1912
8. Grand Duchess Tatiana of Russia wearing a large hat with a wide brim, 1912
9. Coat of sable illustrated in Journal des Dames et des Modes, 1912
10. Victoria Ocampo, an Argentine writer, with short hair
11. Three ladies vacationing in Mar del Plata, January 1913
12. Cover of Fashion Catalogue for Nordiska Kompaniet, 1913–14
13. Dinner dress for winter 1913–14 illustrating a dress by Jacques Doucet
14. Underwear, 1913

=== Style gallery 1914–1915 ===
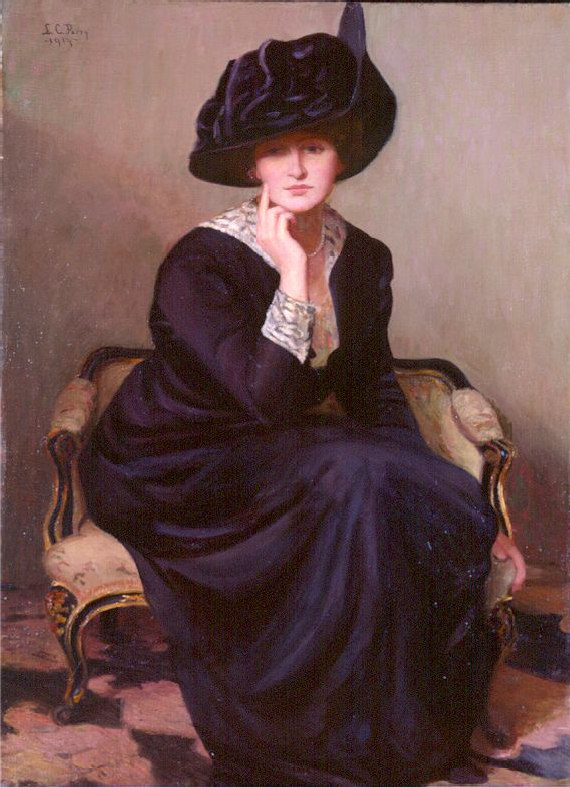
1 – 1914

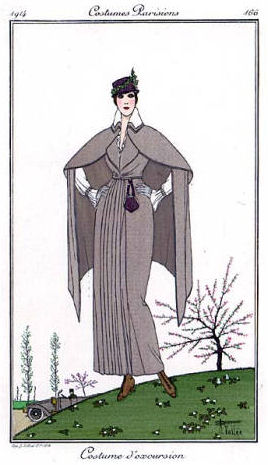
2 – 1914

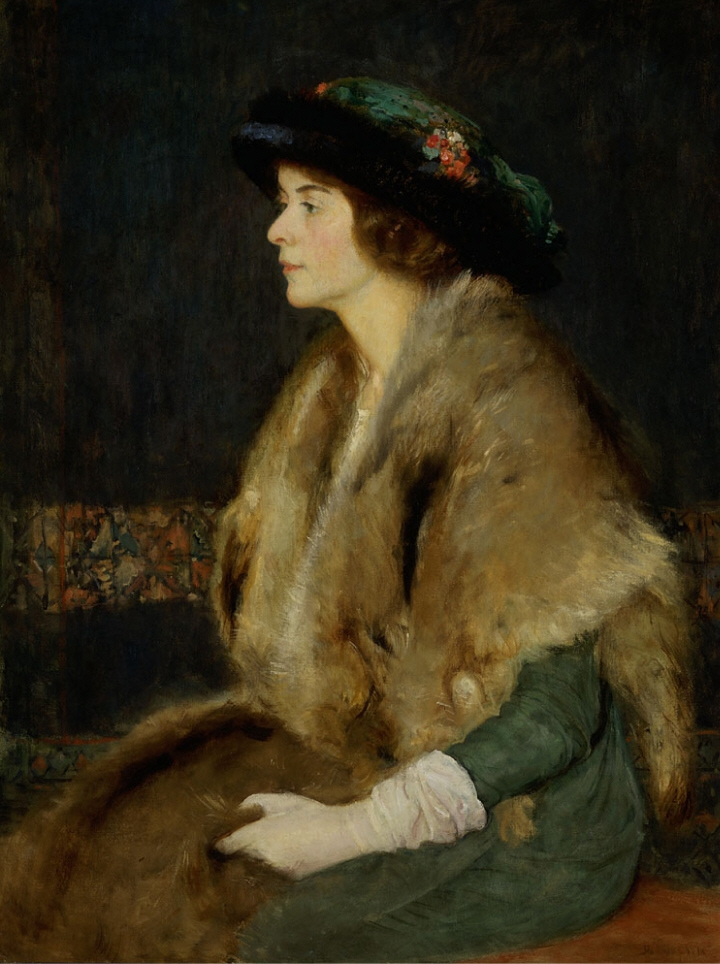
3 – 1914

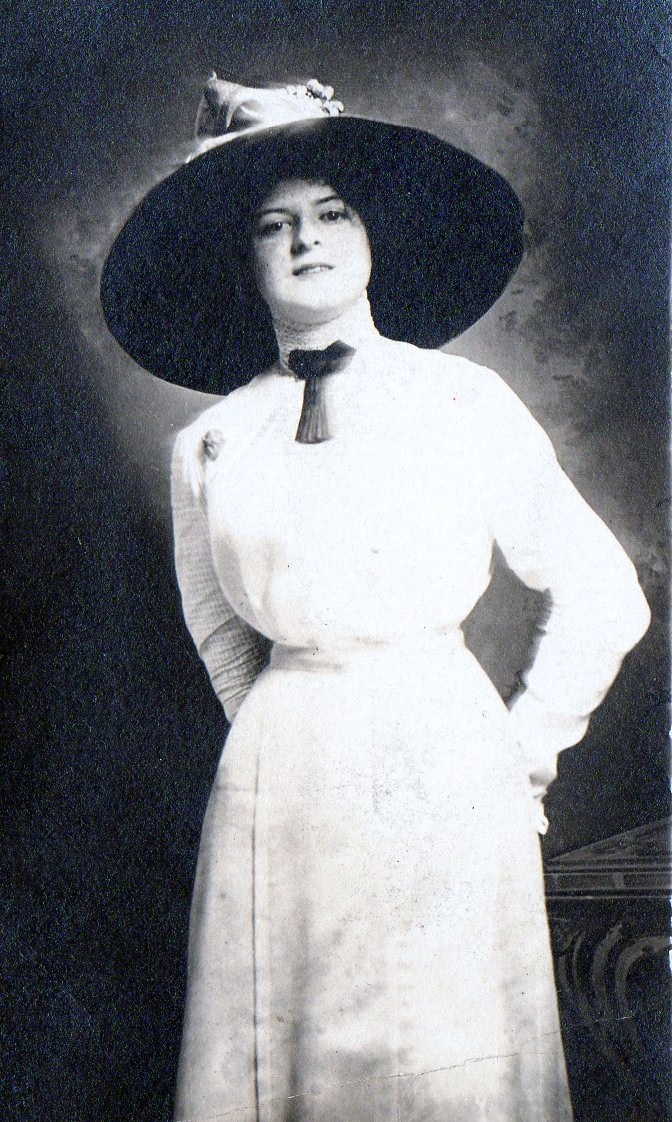
4 – 1914

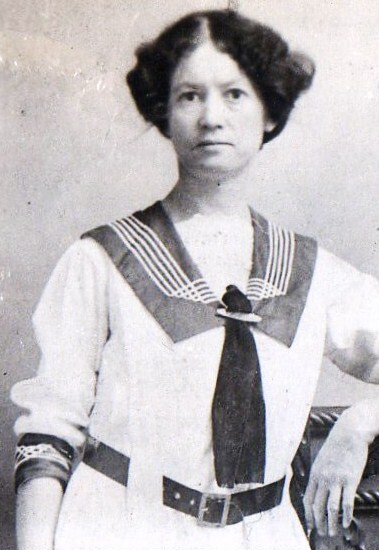
5 – 1914

6 – 1914

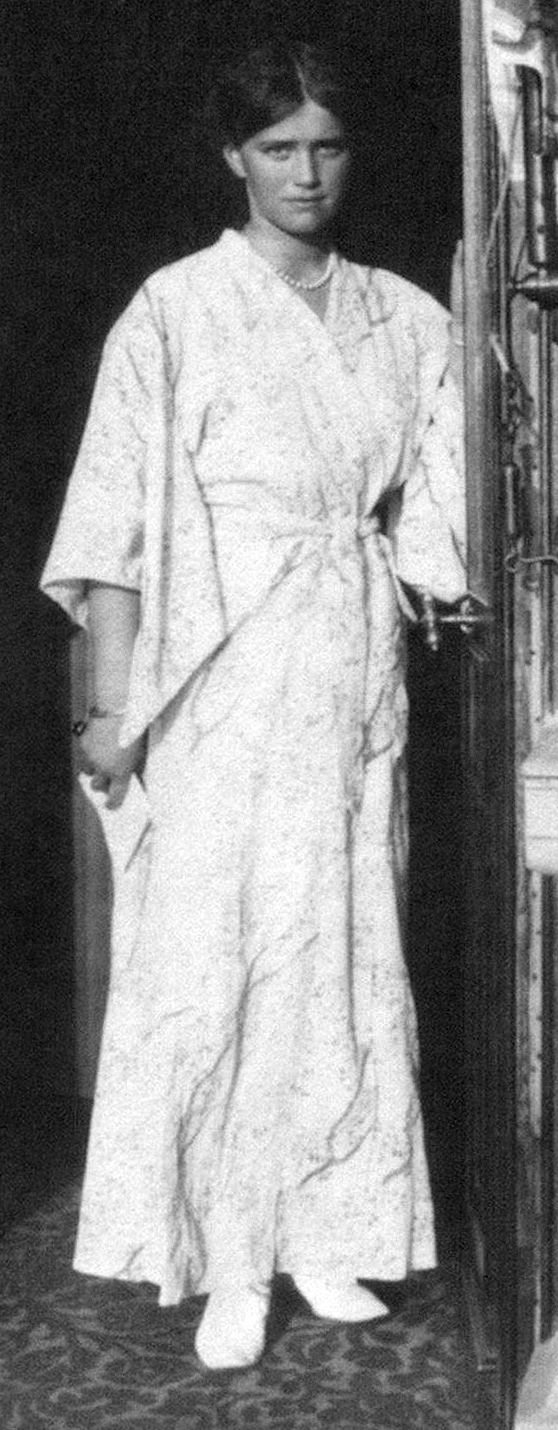
7 – 1915

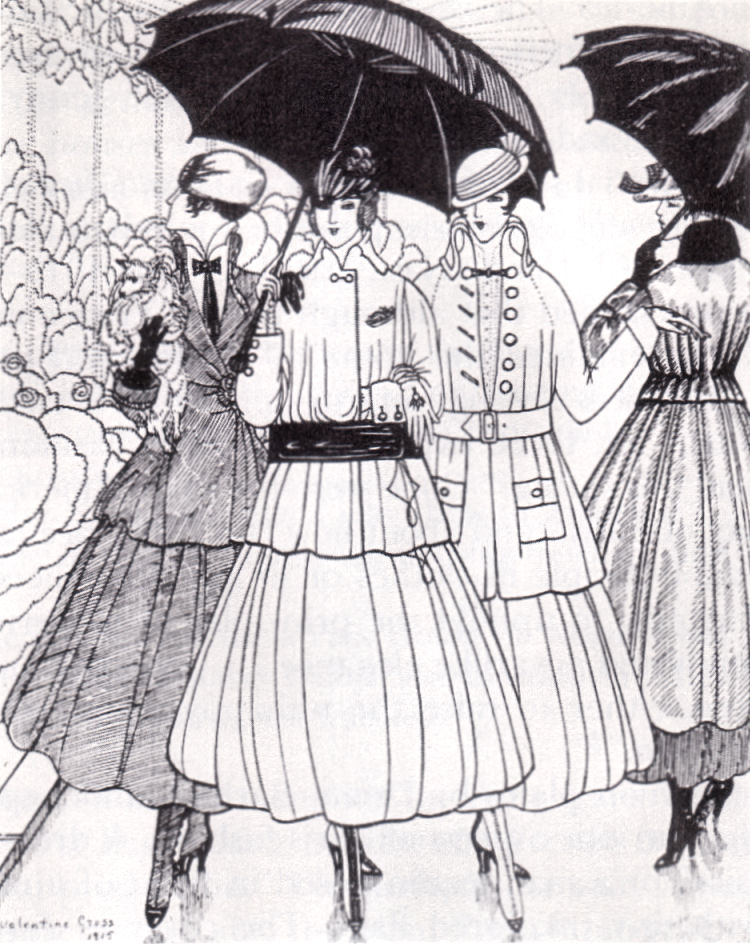
8 – 1915

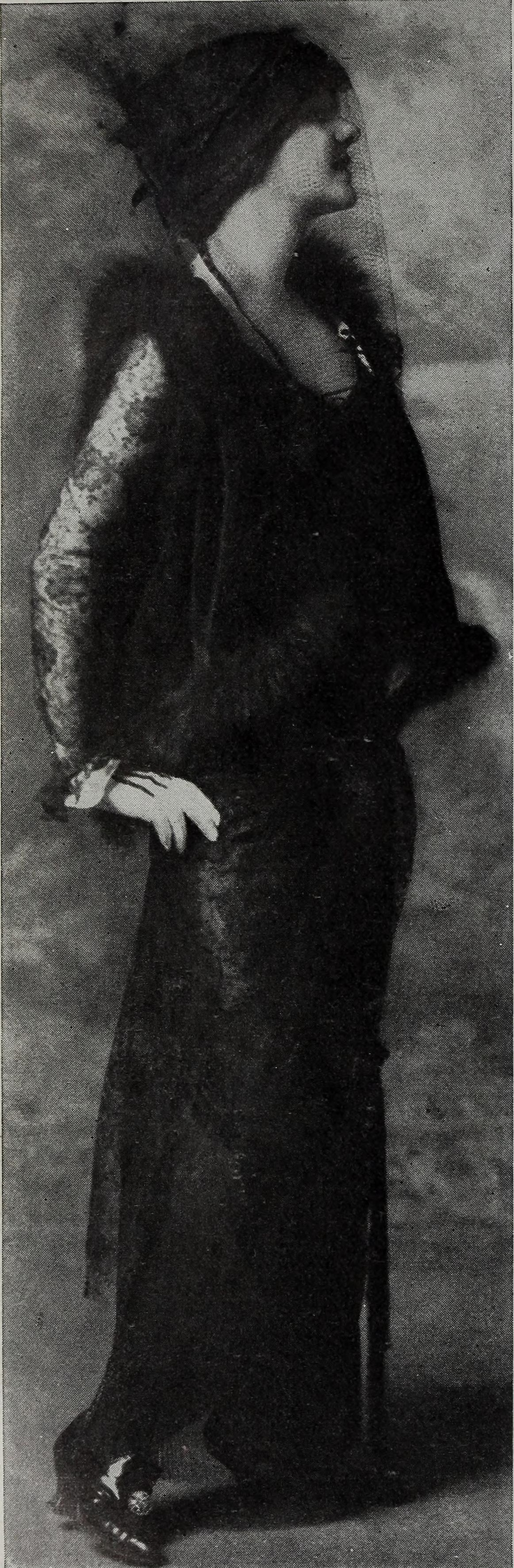
9 - 1915

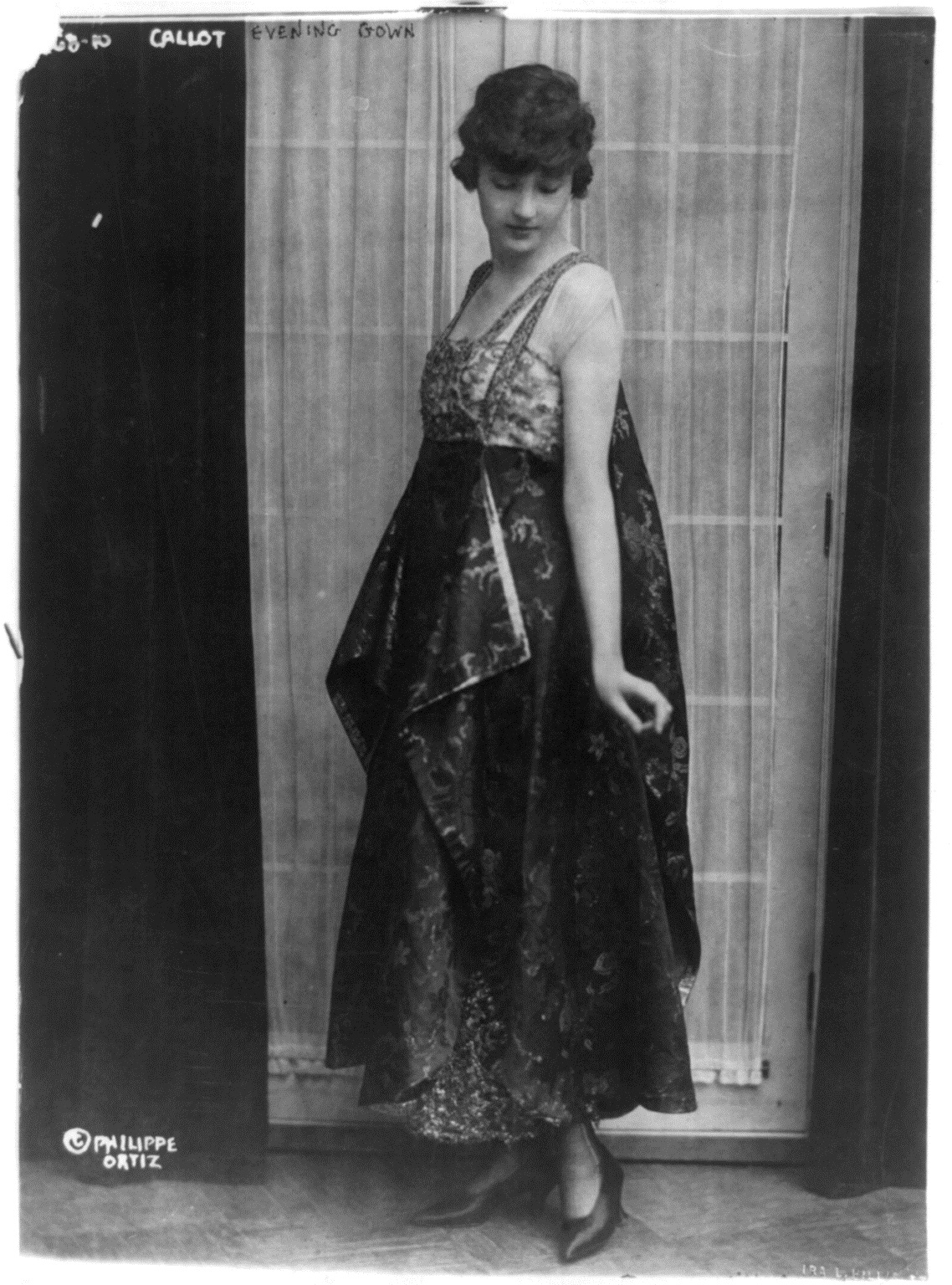
10 – 1915

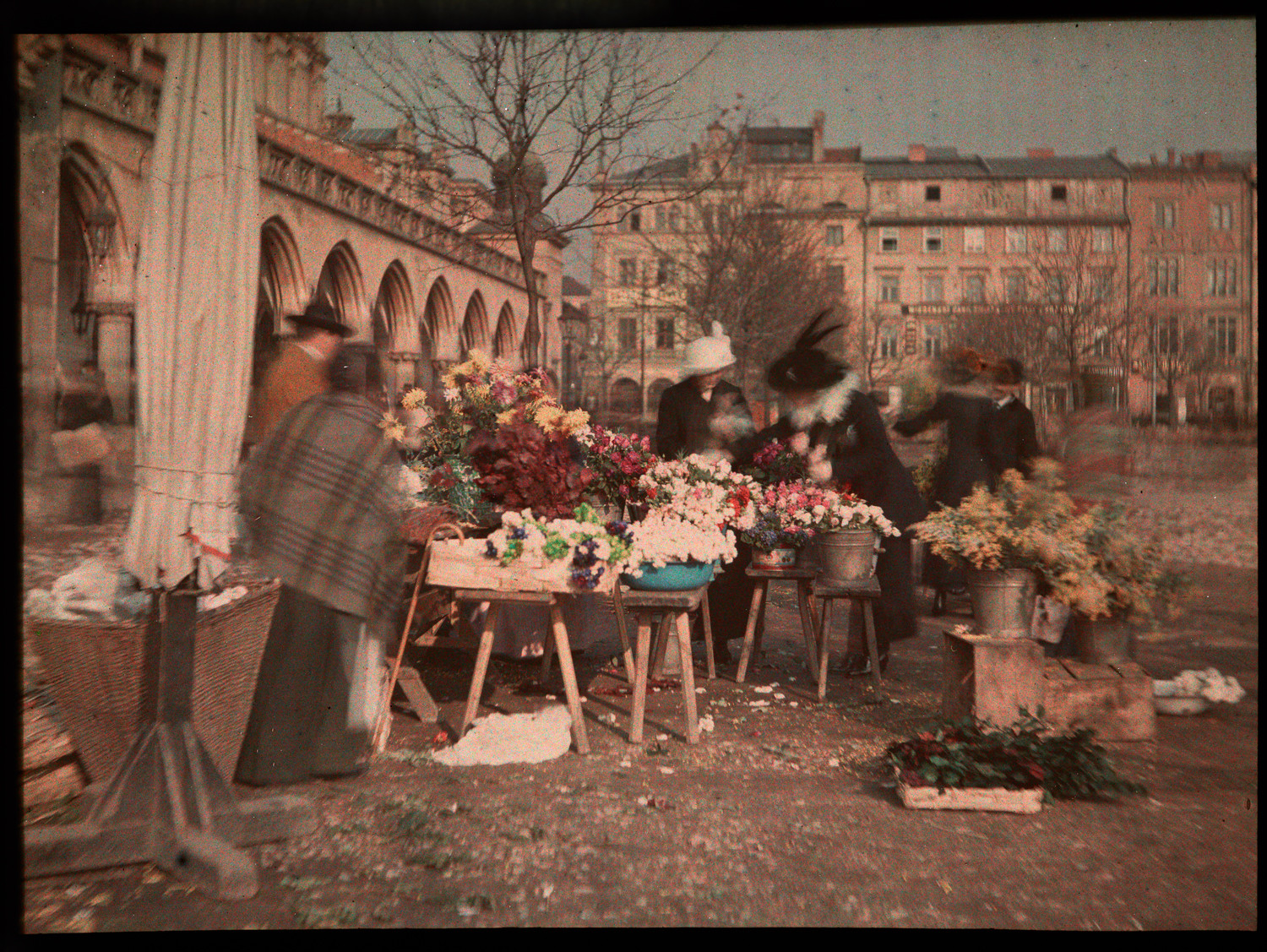
11 – 1915

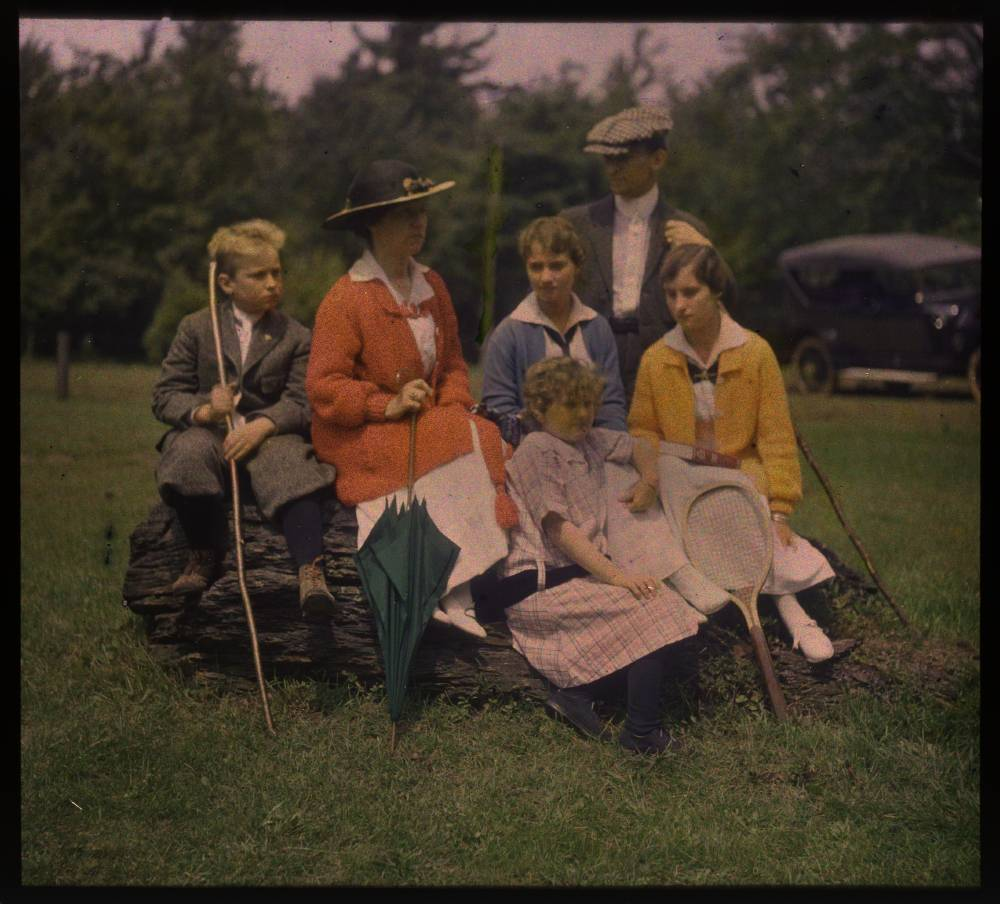
12 – c. 1915
1. Large hats remained the focus of daytime fashion to mid decade, 1914
2. Costume d'excursion or traveling costume of 1914 illustrates the tailored style that would replace opulence in the war years
3. Fur muffs and stoles were important fashion accessories in this period.
4. Men's-style cravats were sometimes worn by women in 1914.
5. Woman in 1914 wearing a belted, sailor-collared tunic with a tie.
6. Dancer Irene Castle was an early adopter of bobbed hair, 1914
7. Grand Duchess Maria Nikolaevna of Russia wears a kimono-style dressing gown in 1915. Oriental styles were in fashion during the decade.
8. "War crinolines" by (left to right) Paquin, Lanvin, Georges Doeuillet, and Paquin, La Gazette du Bon Ton 1915.
9. Portrait of Gladys Hulette wearing the latest fashion of July 1915
10. High-waisted dinner dress by Callot Soeurs, 1915
11. Women buying flowers at the market in 1915 in Kraków, Poland (Autochrome Lumière photo).
12. American family at outdoor excursion c. 1915 (Autochrome Lumière photo).

=== Style gallery 1915–1916 ===
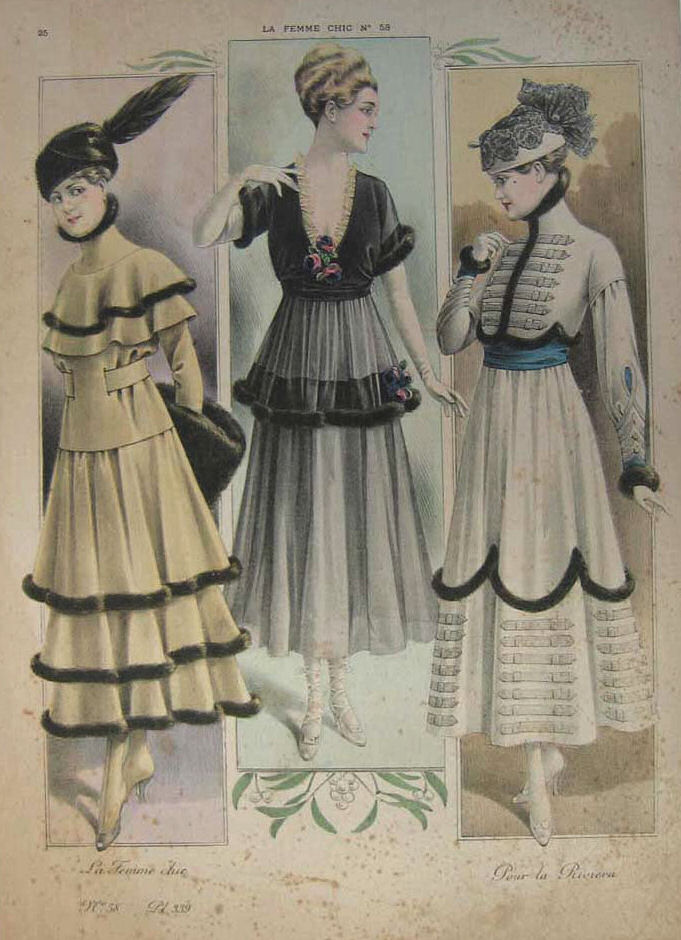
1 – c. 1915–16

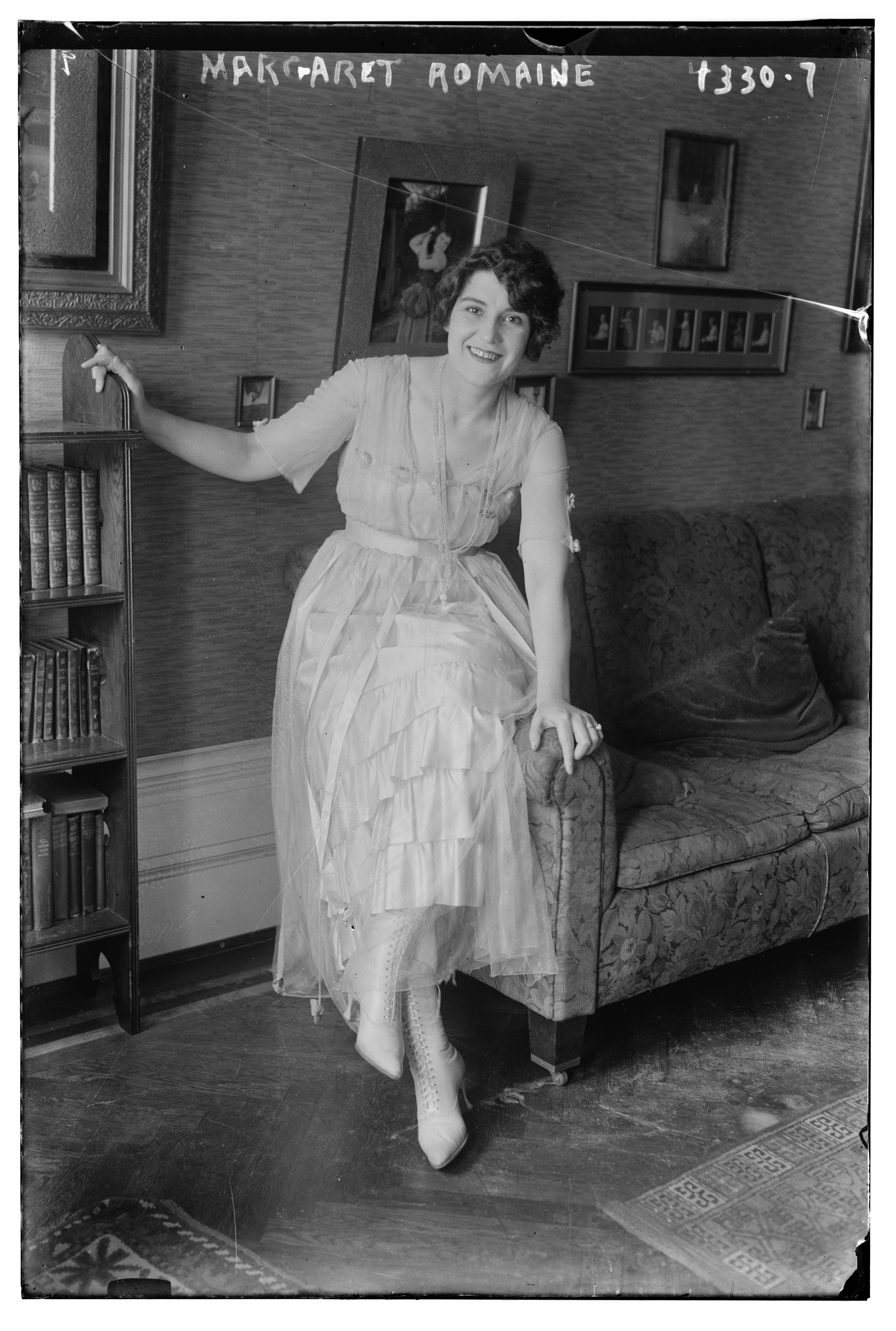
2 – c.1915–16

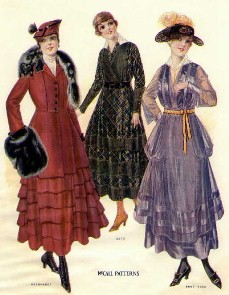
3 – c. 1916

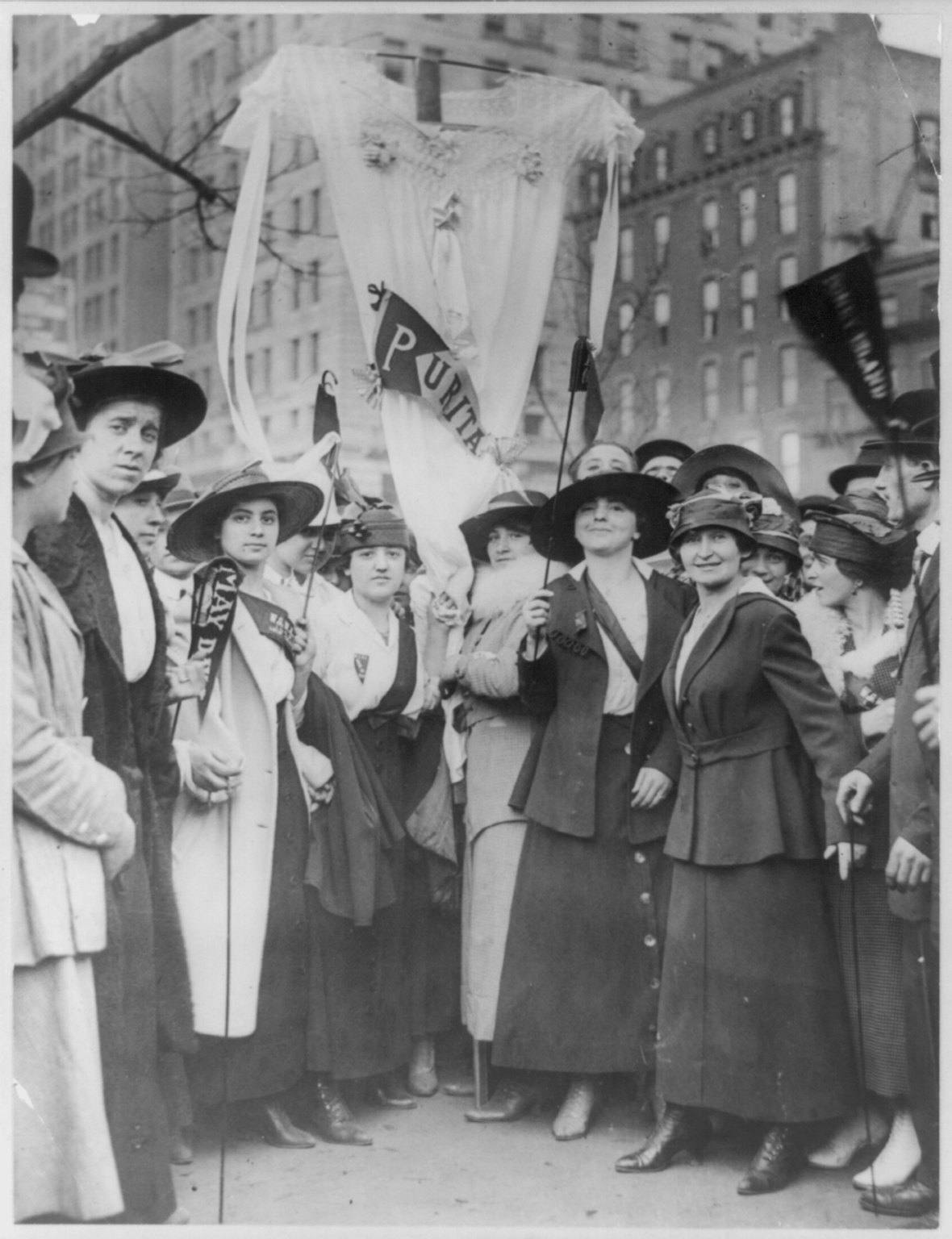
4 – 1916
1. French fashions from c. 1915–16 still feature raised waists, but skirts are fuller and hats are smaller than in the early years of the decade
2. Margaret Romaine c. 1915–16
3. Illustration from McCall's c. 1916 shows natural waistlines and full, shorter skirts
4. Garment workers in a May Day parade of 1916, New York.

=== Style gallery 1917–1919 ===
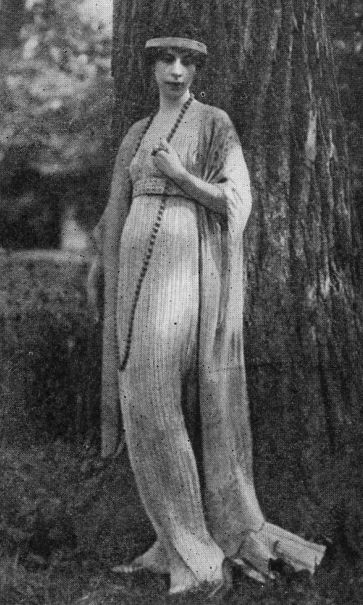
1 – 1917

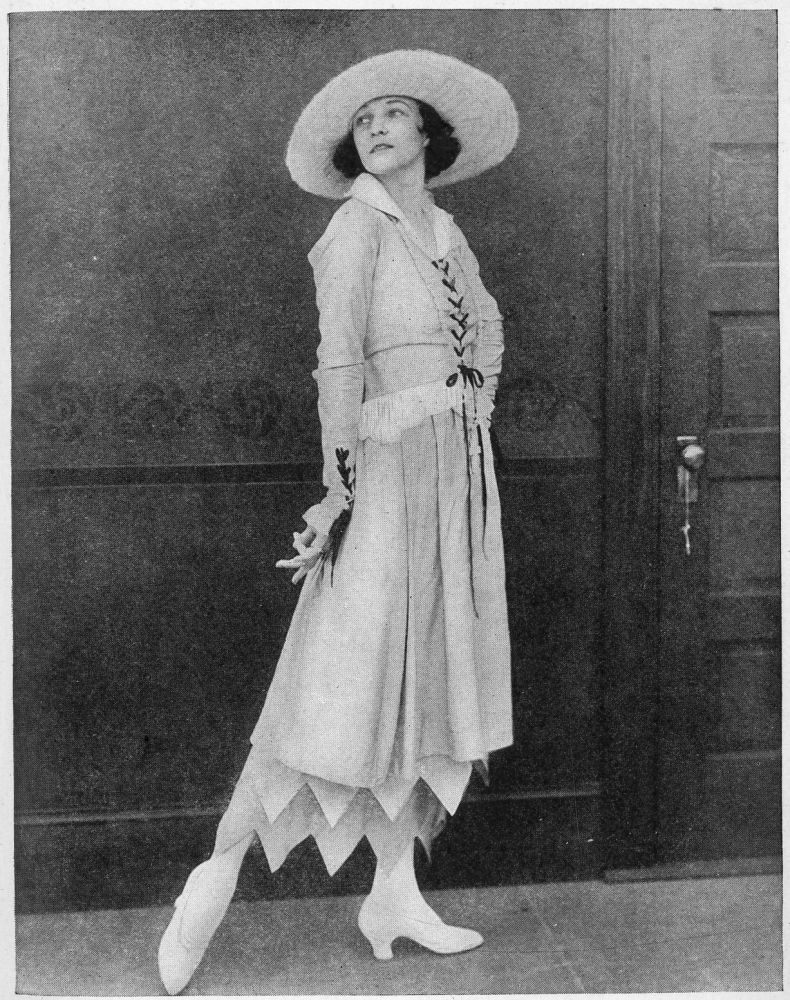
2 – 1916–17

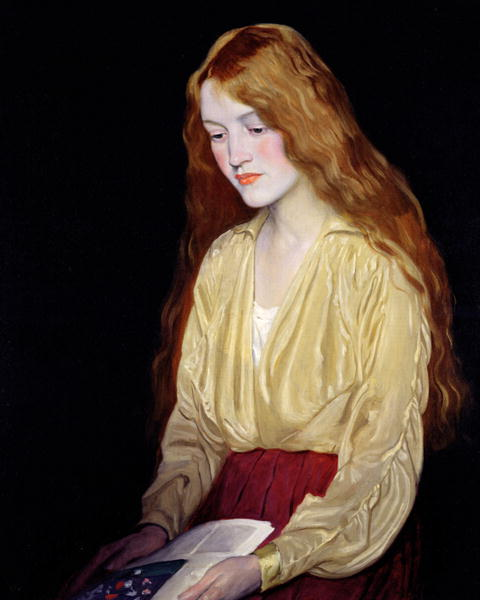
3 – 1917

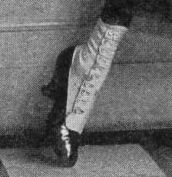
4 – 1917

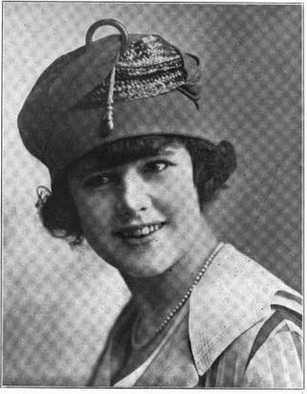
5 – 1917

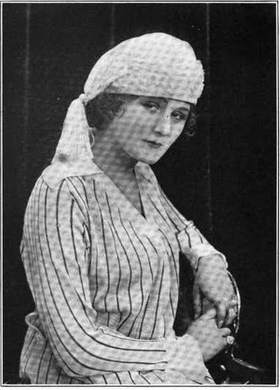
6 – 1917

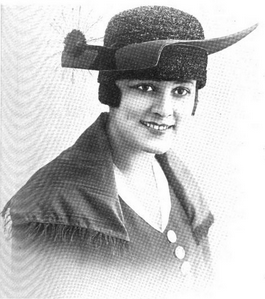
7 – 1917

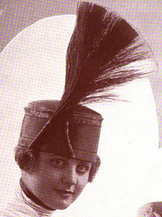
8 – 1917

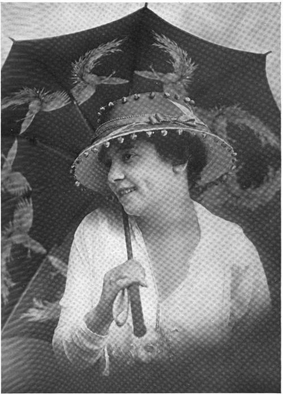
9 – 1917

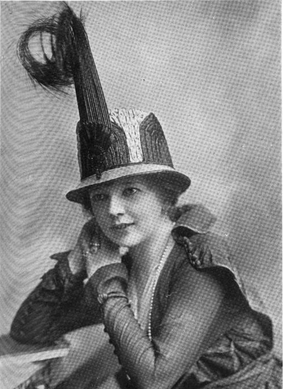
10 – 1917

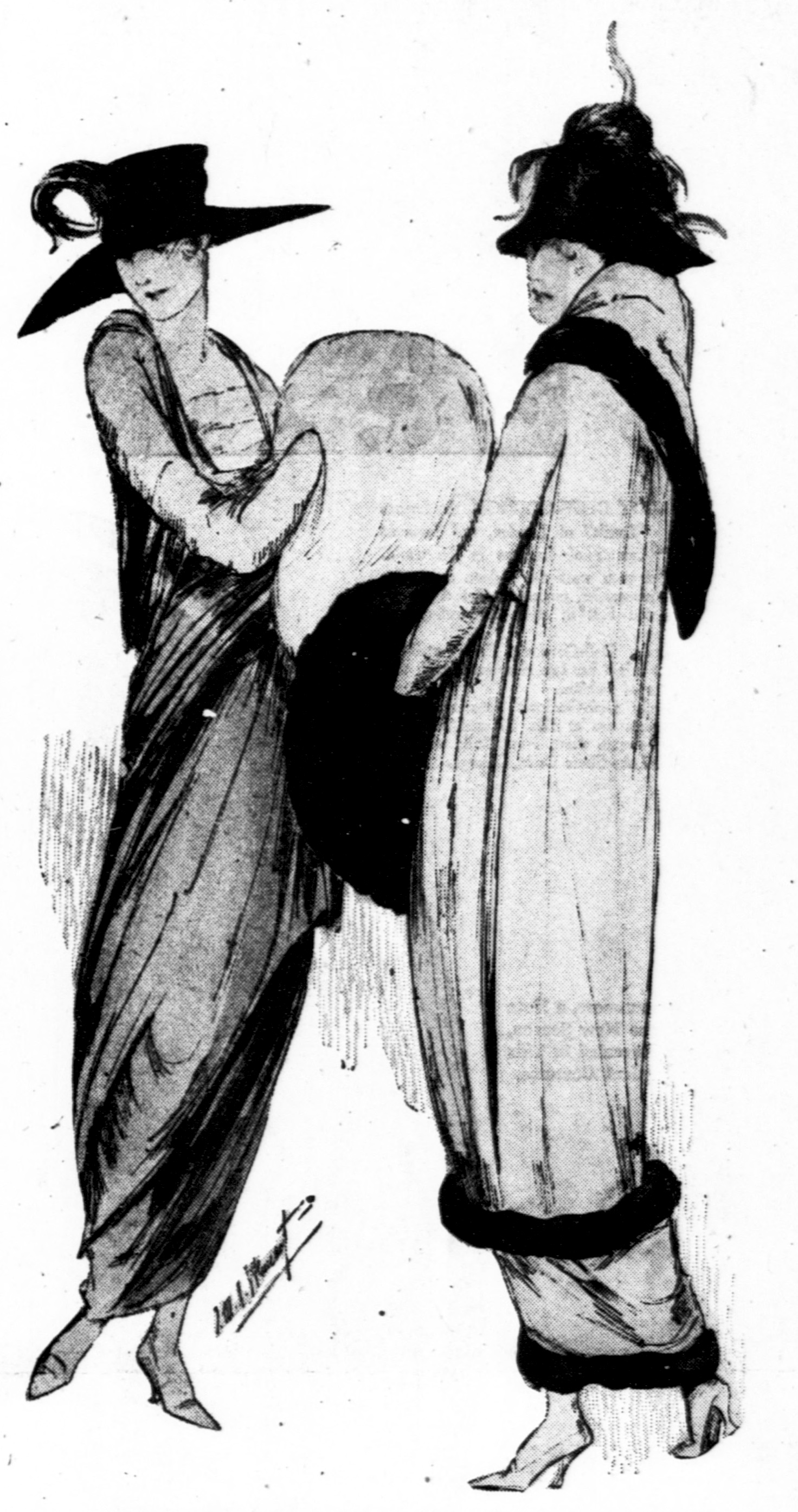
11 - 1918

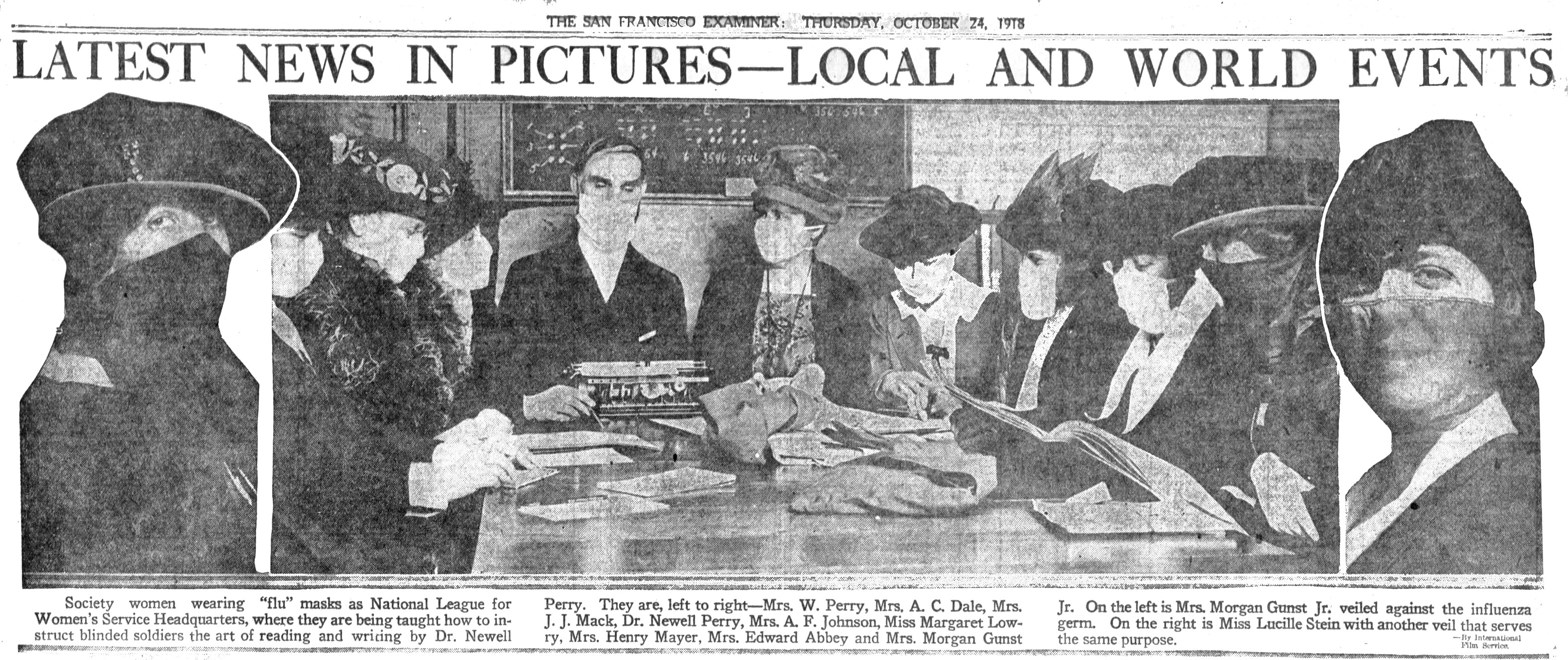
12 - 1918

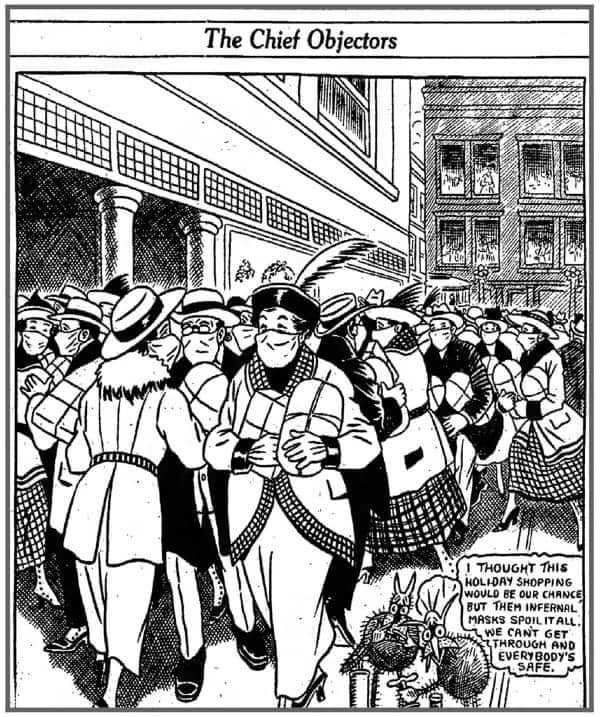
13 - 1918

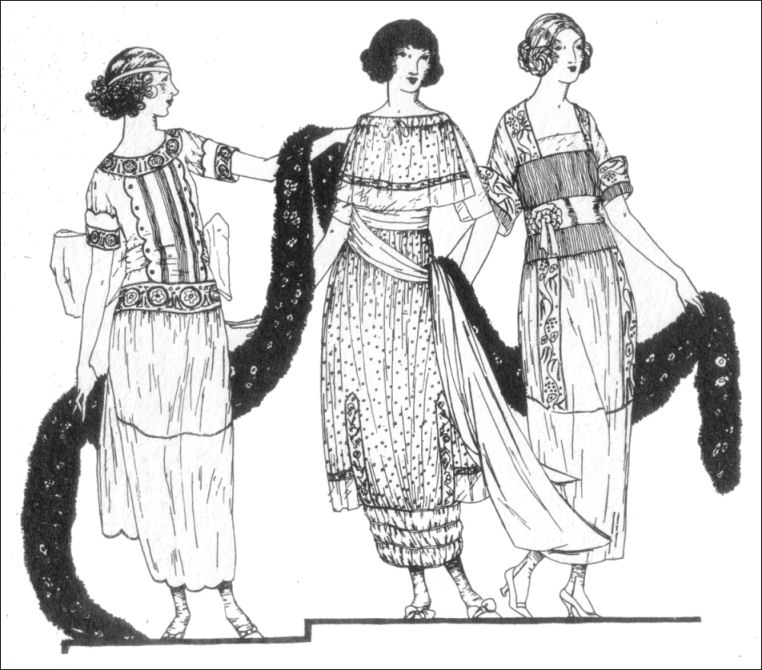
14 – 1919

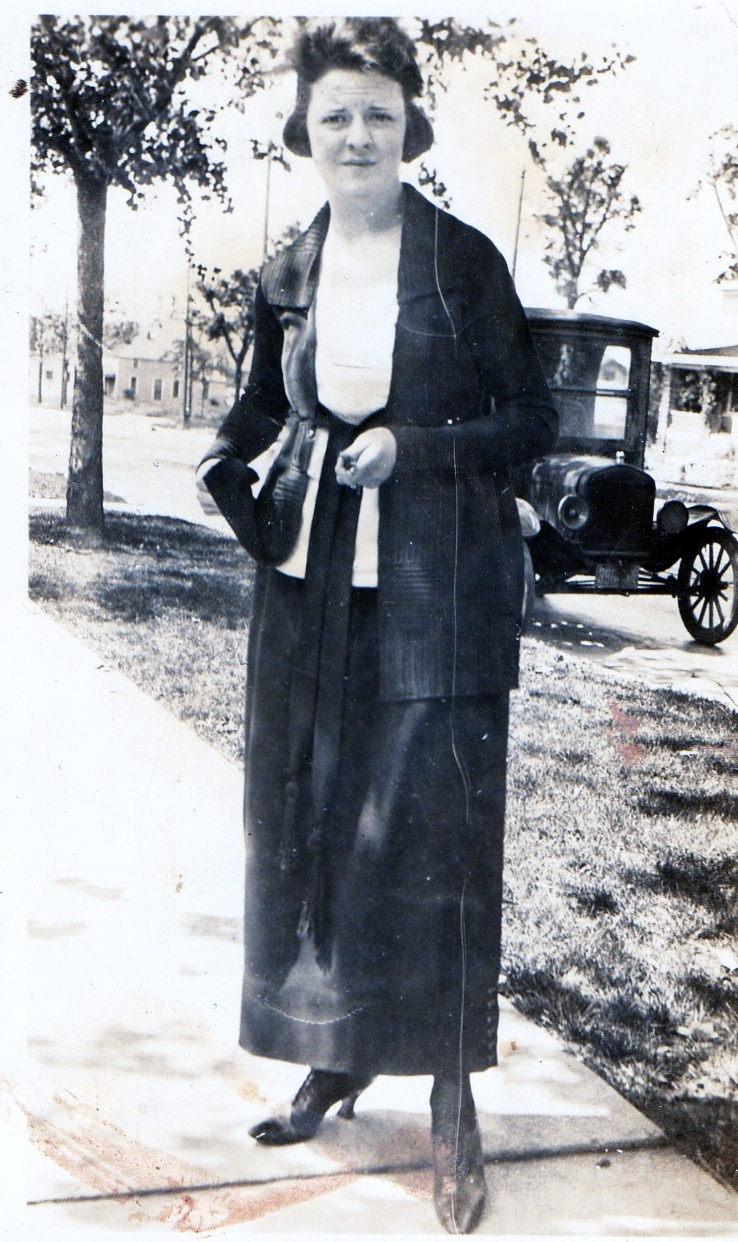
15 – 1919

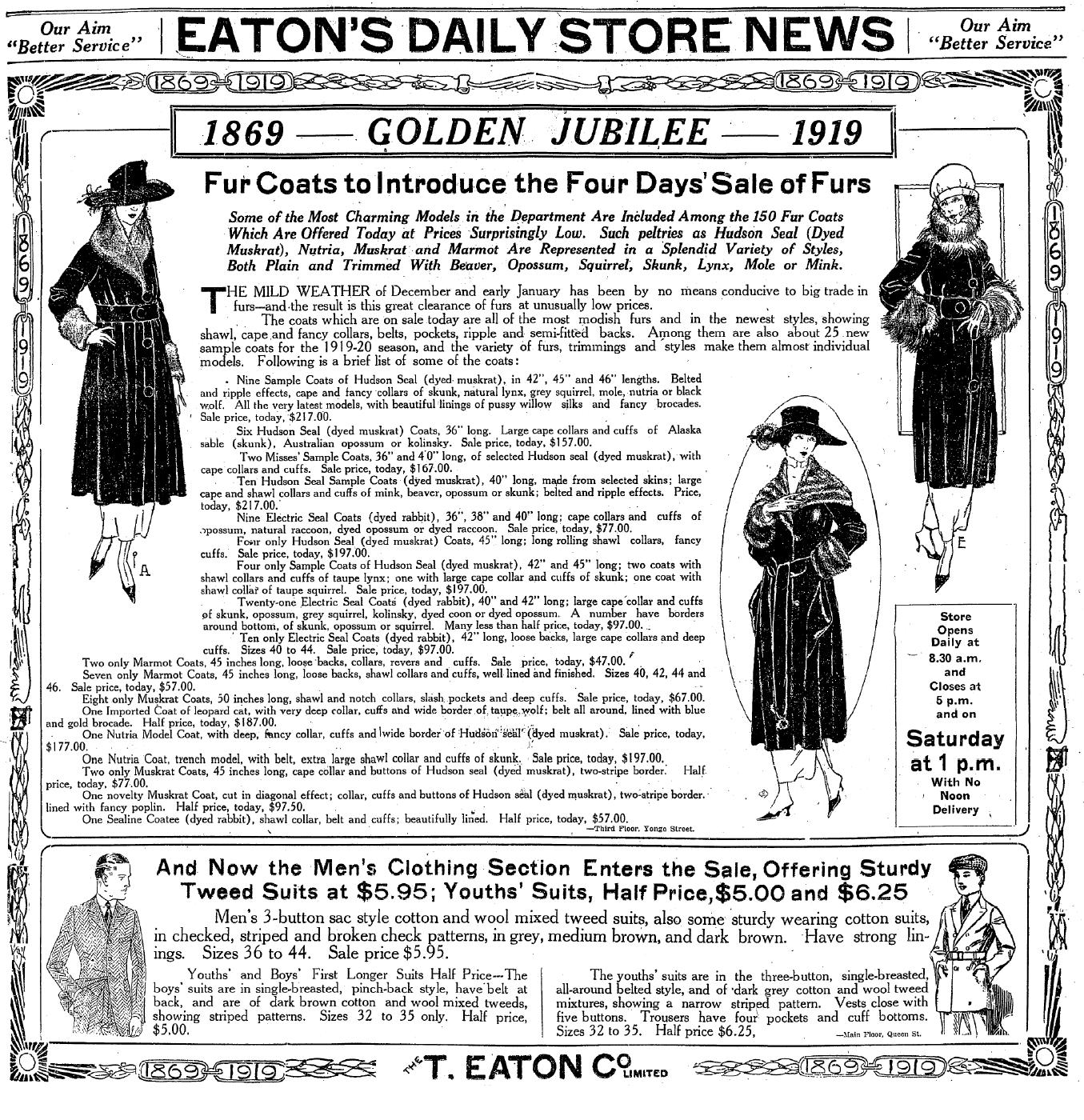
16 – 1919

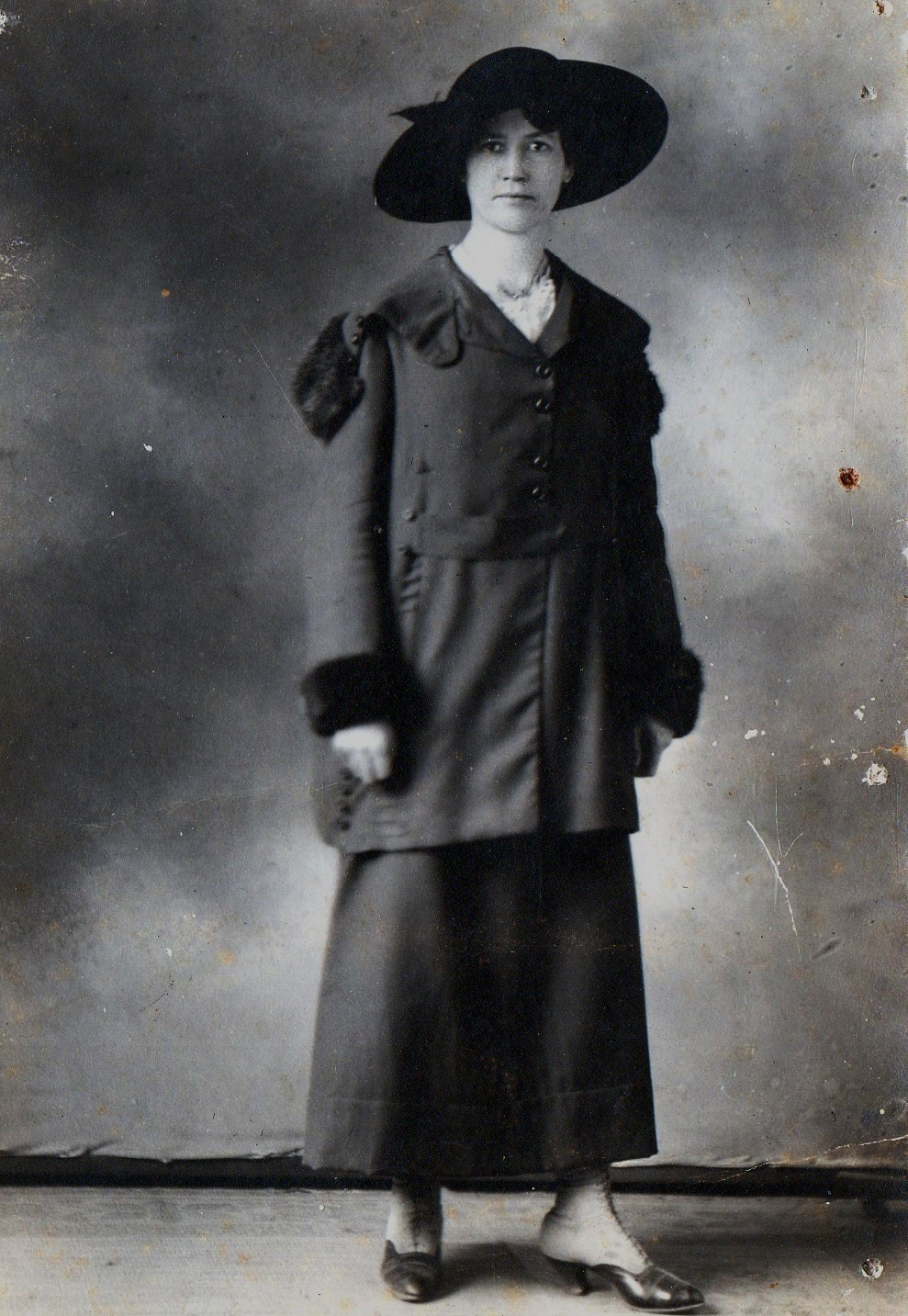
17 – 1919

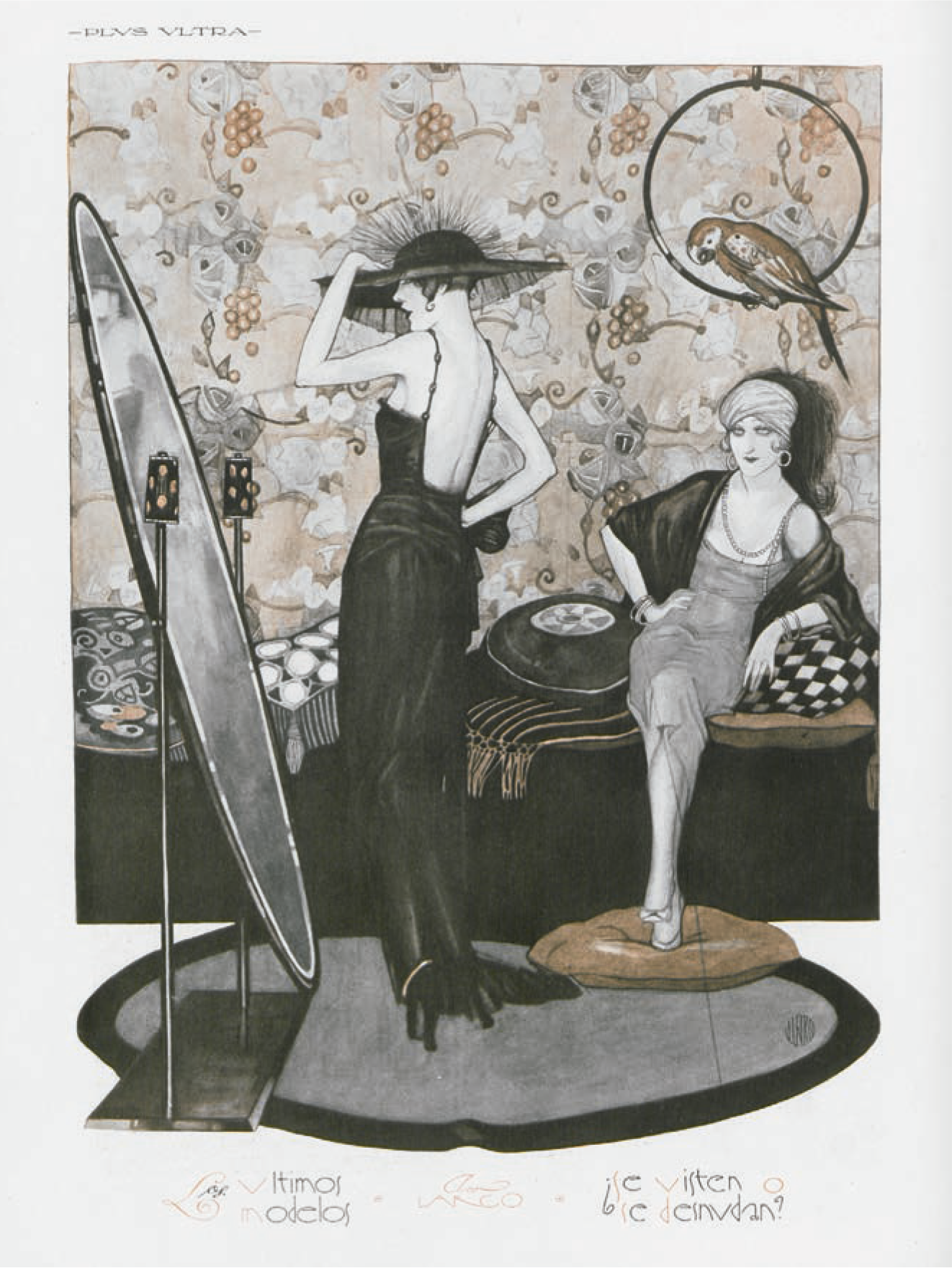
18 – 1919
1. Fortuny tea gown worn by Mrs. Condé Nast, published 1917
2. Irene Castle wears a summer costume of 1916 or 17. The tiered skirt foreshadows the shorter skirts that would arise in the early 1920s.
3. Portrait of 1917 shows the deep V-neckline that was popular after 1913, worn over a camisole.
4. Winter shoe, 1917
5. Draped turban, 1917
6. Toque of 1917 New York design
7. Elzee hat by Levis-Zukoski Mercantile Co of Missouri
8. Hat by D. B. Fisk & Co. of Chicago, 1917
9. 1910s fashion drew inspiration from "exotic" countries including Spain and China.
10. 1917 hat by Sinclair, Rooney & Co. of Buffalo, New York
11. Fall 1918
12. San Francisco society women wearing face masks during the "Spanish Influenza" pandemic, October 1918.
13. Cartoon depicting holiday shoppers during the 1918 flu pandemic.
14. Post-war summer afternoon dresses show the barrel shape and lowered waists that would characterize the styles of the early 1920s. Vogue, late June 1919.
15. In 1919, hemlines had begun to rise as can be seen in this photograph of a young woman.
16. Advertisement for fur coats from Eaton's Department Store, 1919
17. Day walking suit worn in 1919. The jacket is loose, belted, with fur-trimmed sleeves and lappets.
18. Argentine fashion illustration presenting "the latest models", 1919

== Men's fashion ==
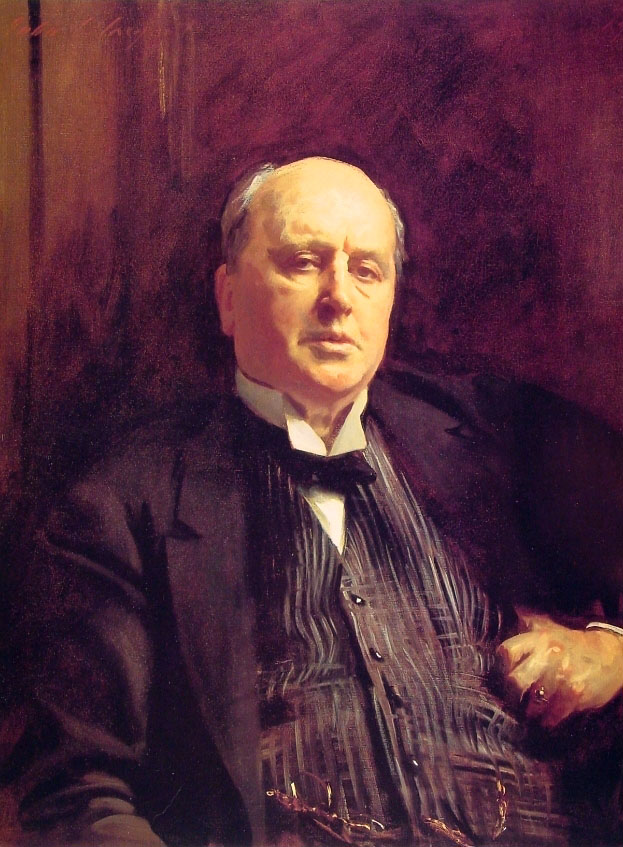
Writer Henry James wears a checked, single-breasted waistcoat or vest with a prominent watch chain, a wing-collared shirt, and a bow tie. Portrait by Sargent, 1913.

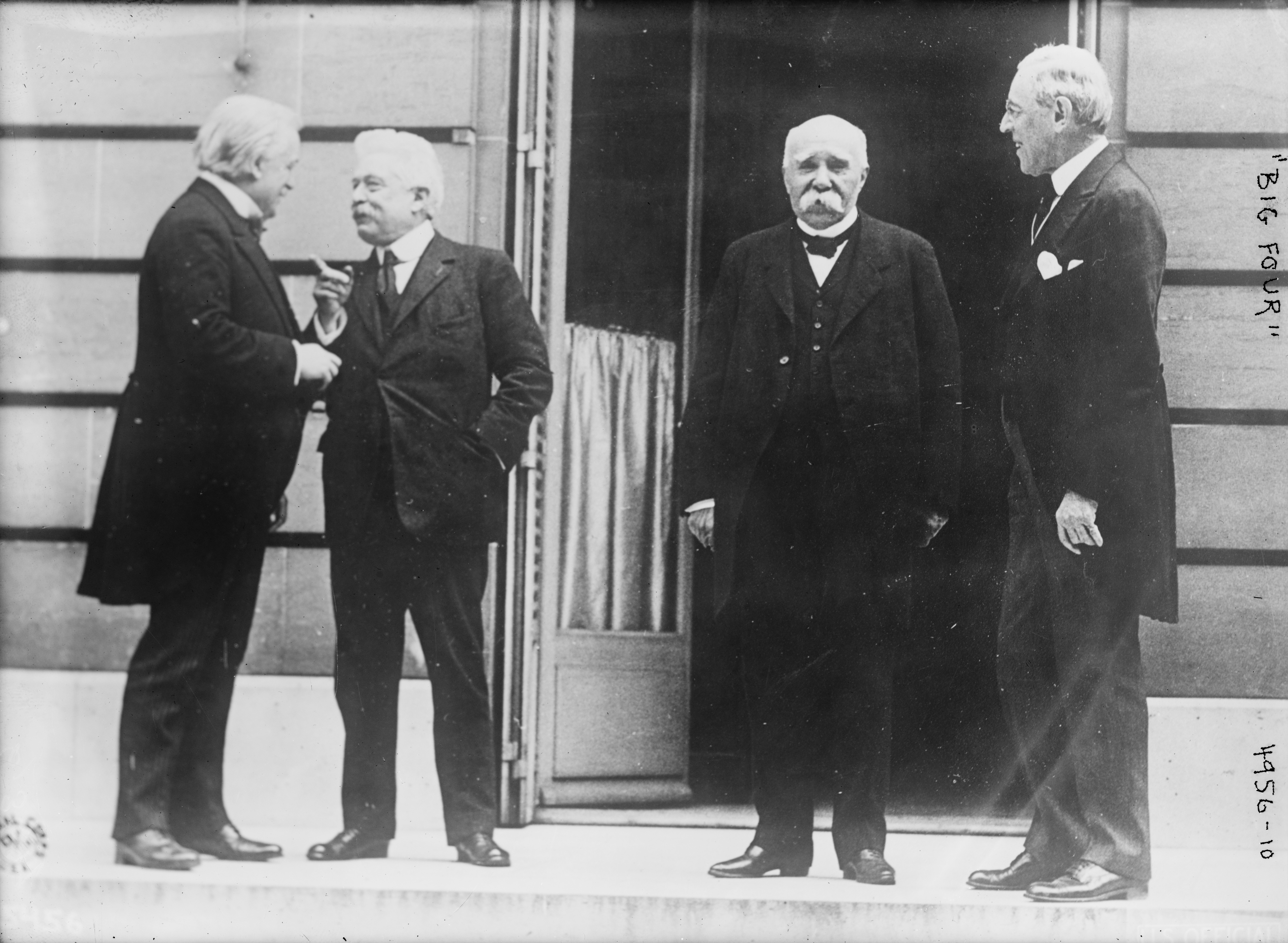
World leaders at the signing of the Treaty of Versailles, 1919, wear morning dress and lounge suits.

In general, styles were unchanged from the previous decade. Hair was generally worn short. Wide moustaches were often curled. A decline in wearing facial hair, a trend which had begun around the beginning of the century, continued throughout the decade as more clean shaven styles appear.

=== Coats, waistcoats, and trousers ===
The sack coat or lounge coat continued to replace the frock coat for most informal and semi-formal occasions. Three-piece suits consisting of a sack coat with matching waistcoat (U.S. vest) and trousers were worn, as were matching coat and waistcoat with contrasting trousers, or matching coat and trousers with contrasting waistcoat. Trousers were ankle length with turn-ups or cuffs, and were creased front and back using a trouser press. The gap between the shorter trousers and the shoes was filled with short gaiters or spats.

Waistcoats fastened lower on the chest, and were collarless.

The blazer, a navy blue or brightly colored or striped flannel coat cut like a sack coat with patch pockets and brass buttons, was worn for sports, sailing, and other casual activities.

The Norfolk jacket remained fashionable for shooting and rugged outdoor pursuits. It was made of sturdy tweed or similar fabric and featured paired box pleats over the chest and back, with a fabric belt. Worn with matching breeches or (U.S. knickerbockers), it became the Norfolk suit, suitable for bicycling or golf with knee-length stockings and low shoes, or for hunting with sturdy boots or shoes with leather gaiters.

The cutaway morning coat was still worn for formal day occasions in Europe and major cities elsewhere, with striped trousers.

The most formal evening dress remained a dark tail coat and trousers with a dark or light waistcoat. Evening wear was worn with a white bow tie and a shirt with a winged collar. The less formal dinner jacket or tuxedo, which featured a shawl collar with silk or satin facings, now generally had a single button. Dinner jackets, worn with a white shirt and a dark tie, were gaining acceptance outside of the home.

Knee-length topcoats and calf-length overcoats were worn in winter. Fur coats were worn in the coldest climates.

=== Shirts and neckties ===
Formal dress shirt collars were turned over or pressed into "wings". Collars were overall very tall and stiffened, with rounded corners. The usual necktie was a narrow four-in-hand. Ascot ties were worn with formal day dress and white bow ties with evening wear.

=== Accessories ===
Silk top hats remained a requirement for upper class formal wear; soft felt Homburgs or stiff bowler hats were worn with lounge or sack suits. Flat straw boaters and fedora hats were acceptable for a wider range of activities than previously, and Panama hats were worn for travel. Gentlemen of all classes, especially the middle and working class often wore the newsboy cap and flat cap.

=== Style gallery ===
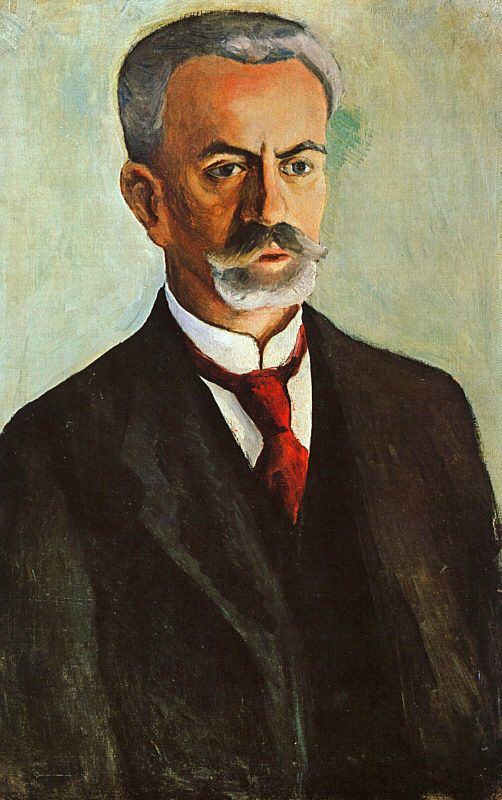
1 – 1910

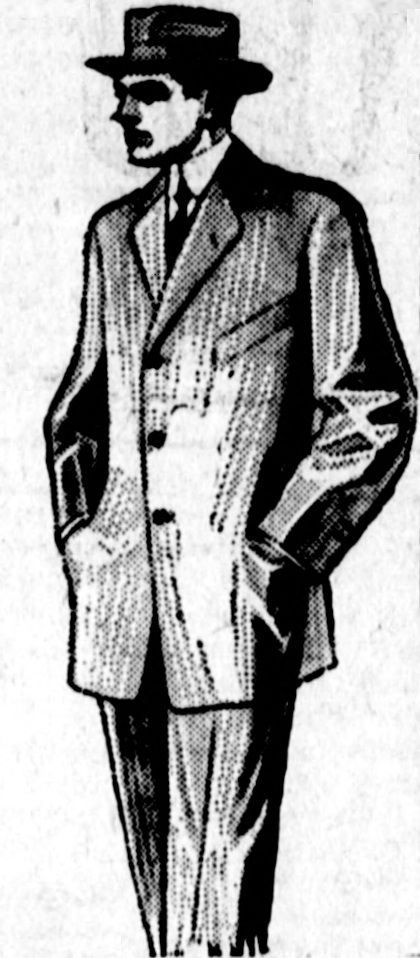
2 - 1911

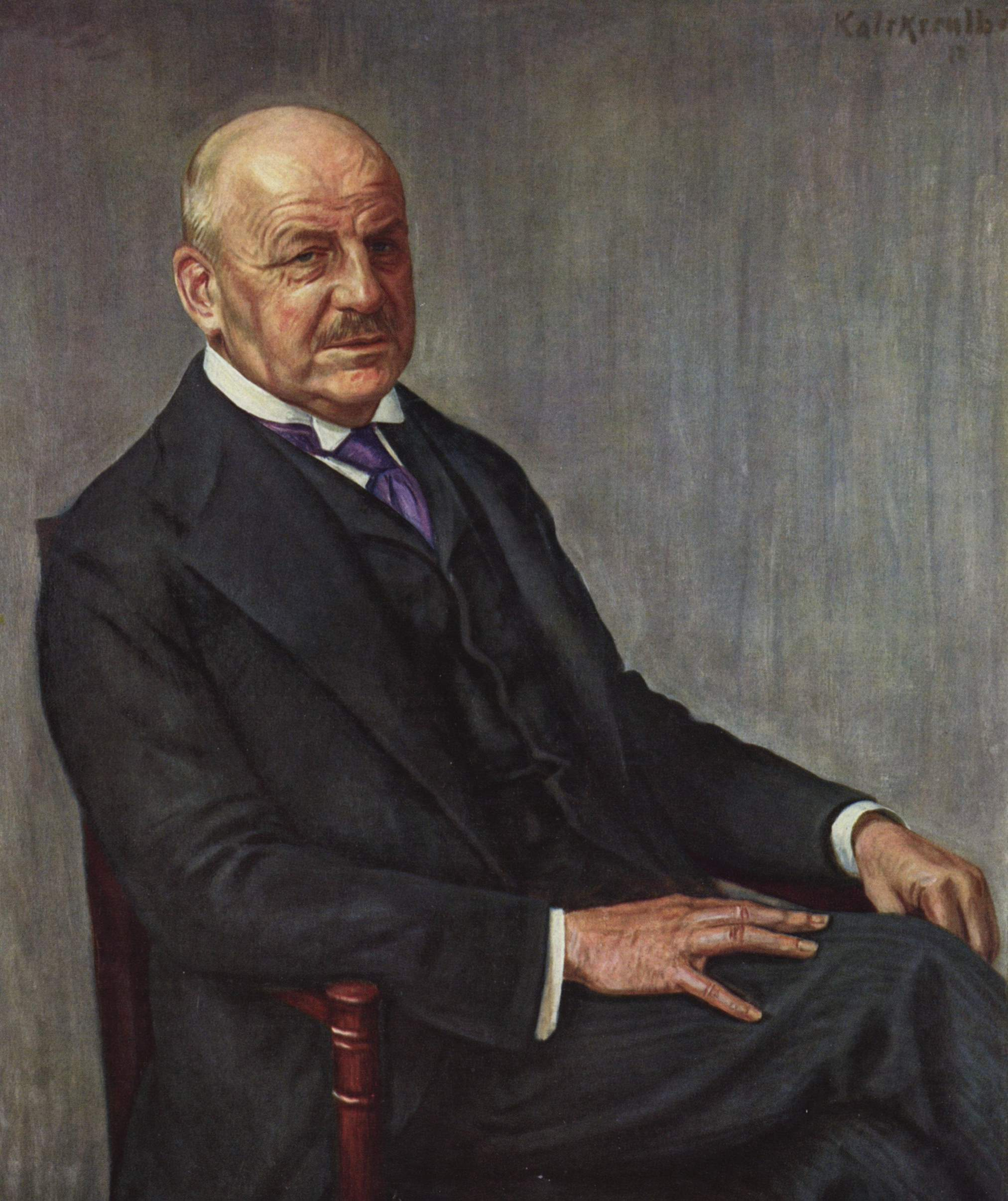
3 – 1912

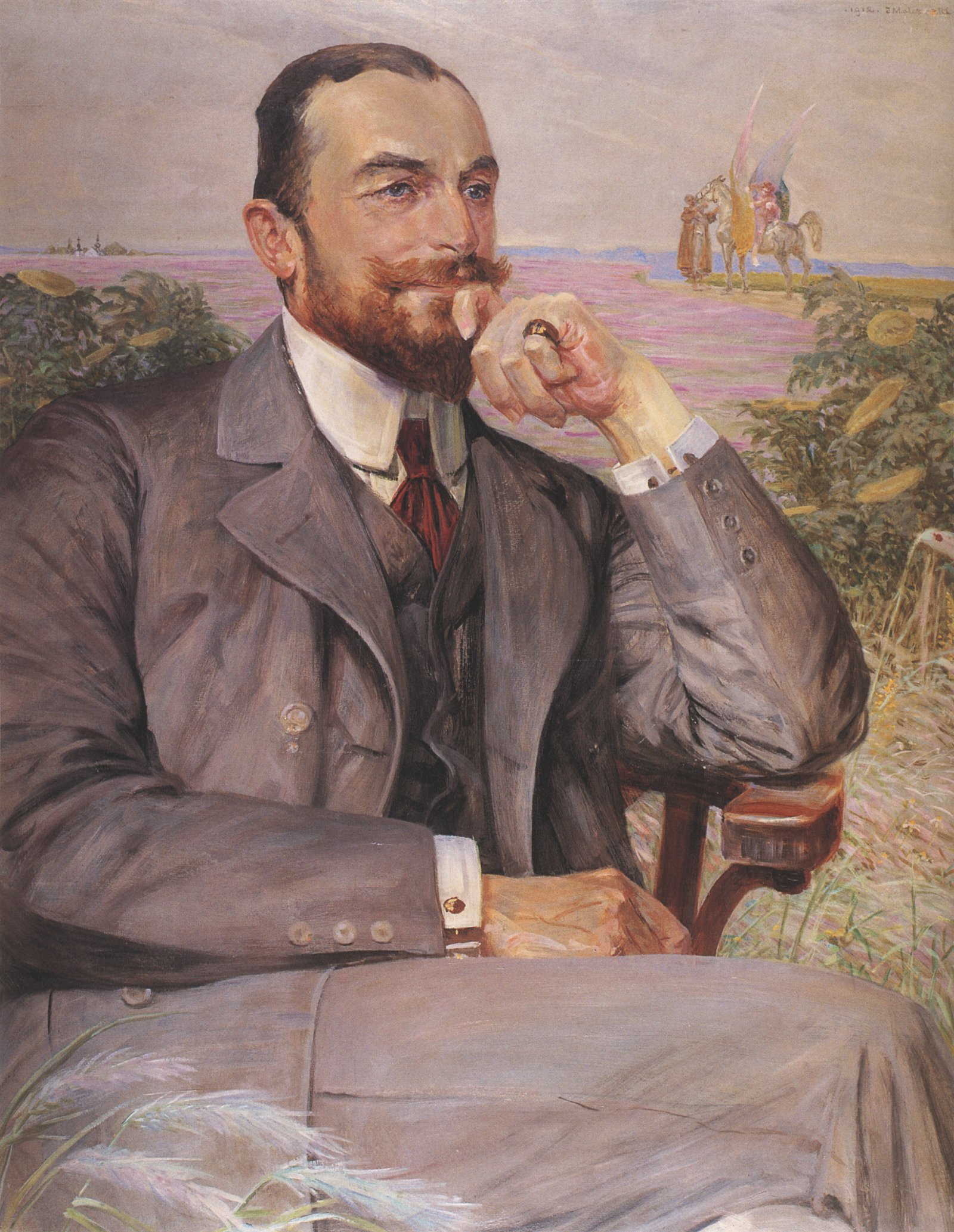
4 – 1912

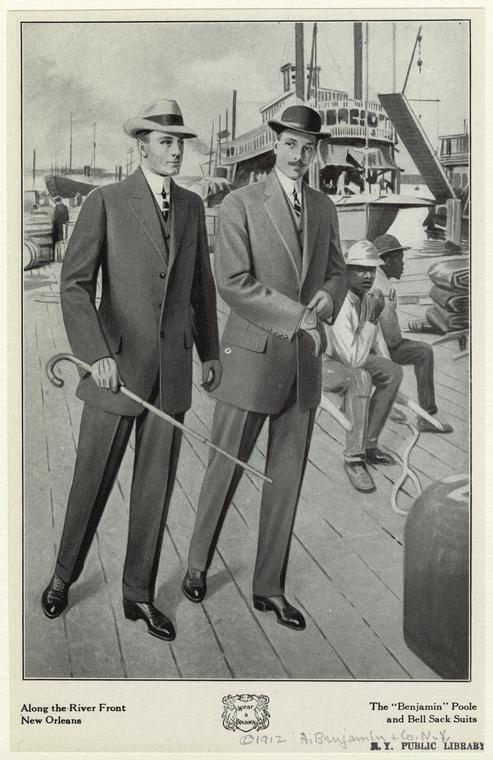
5 – 1912

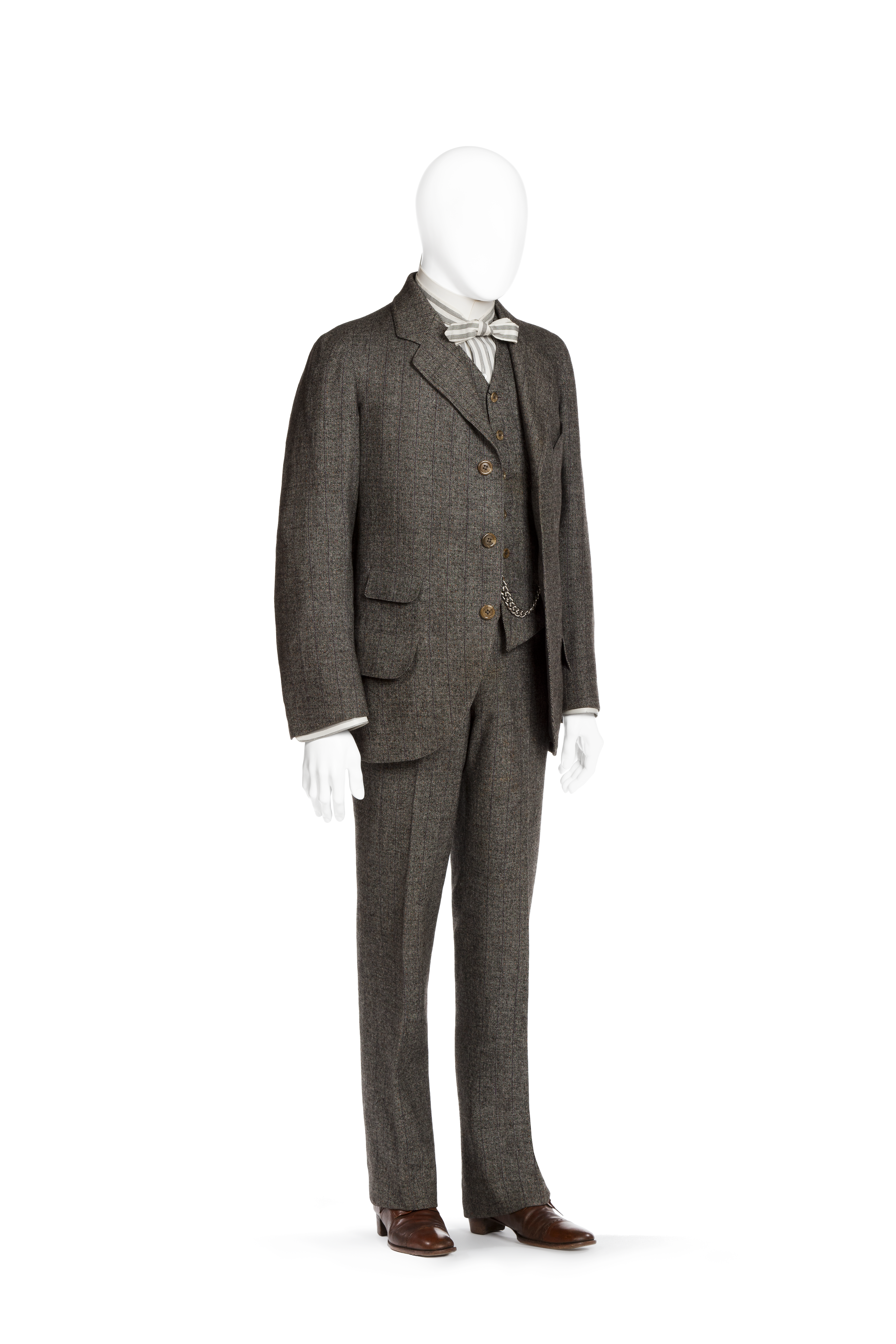
6 - 1912

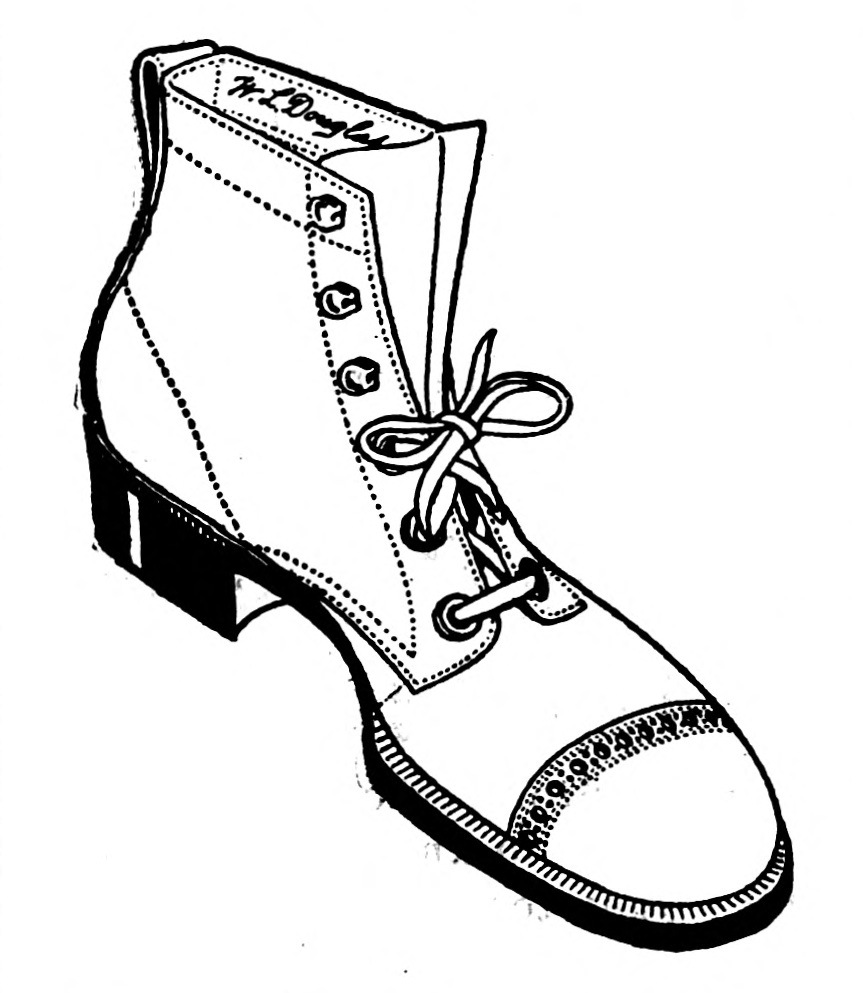
7 - 1913

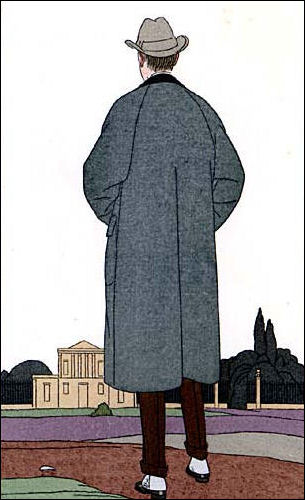
8 – 1914

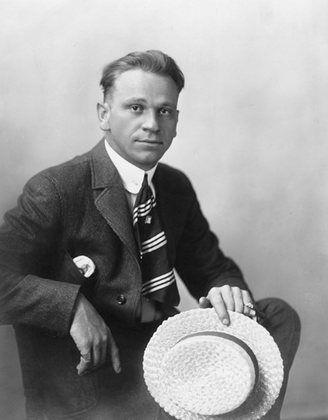
9 – c. 1914

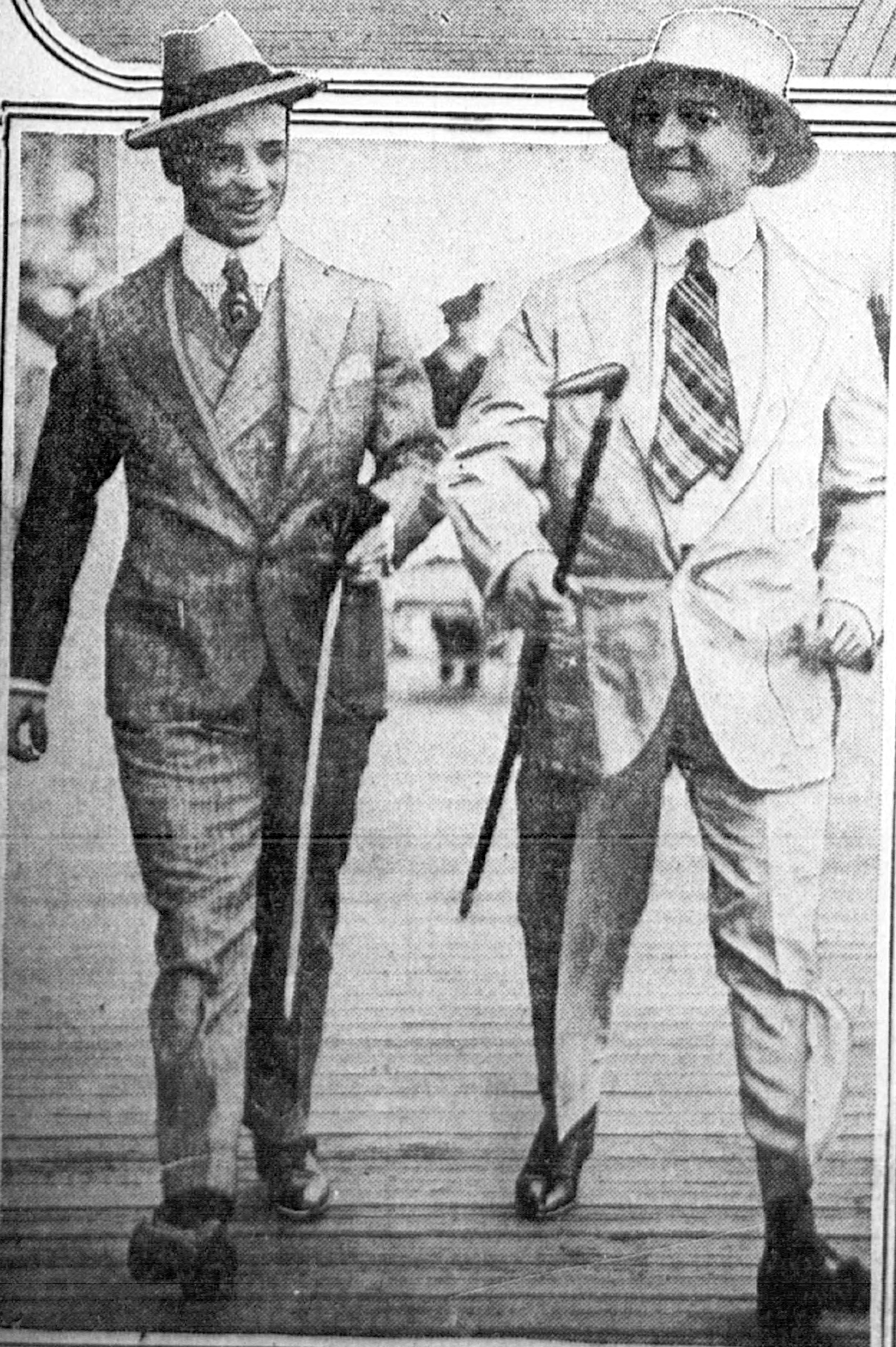
10 - 1915

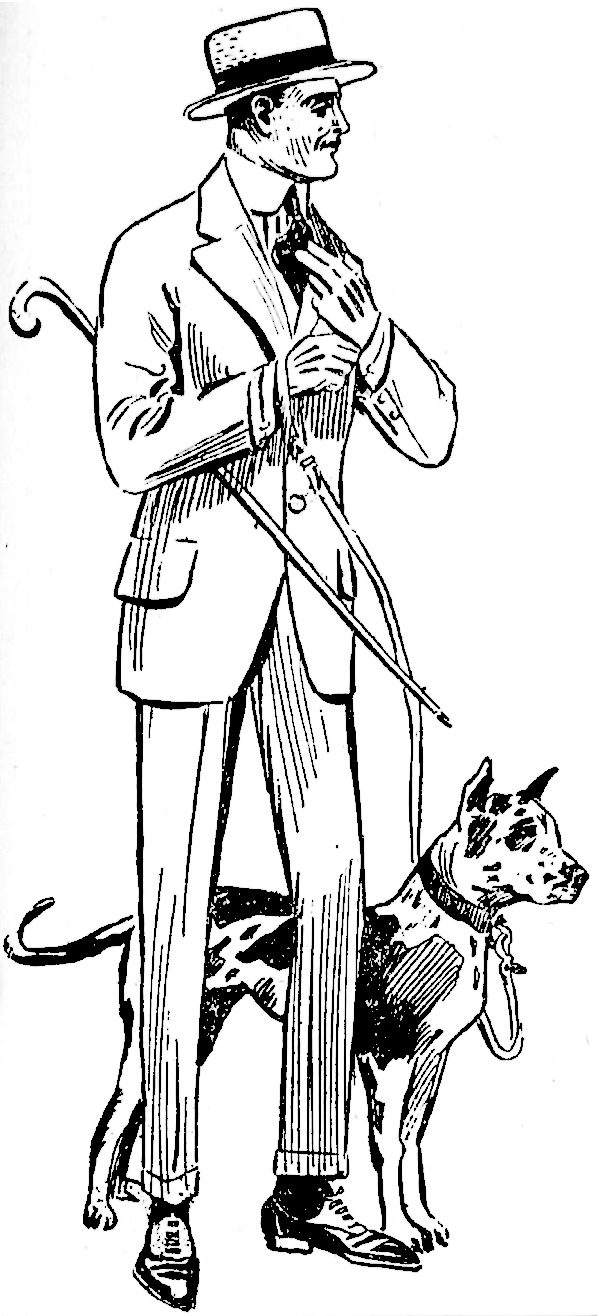
11 - 1916

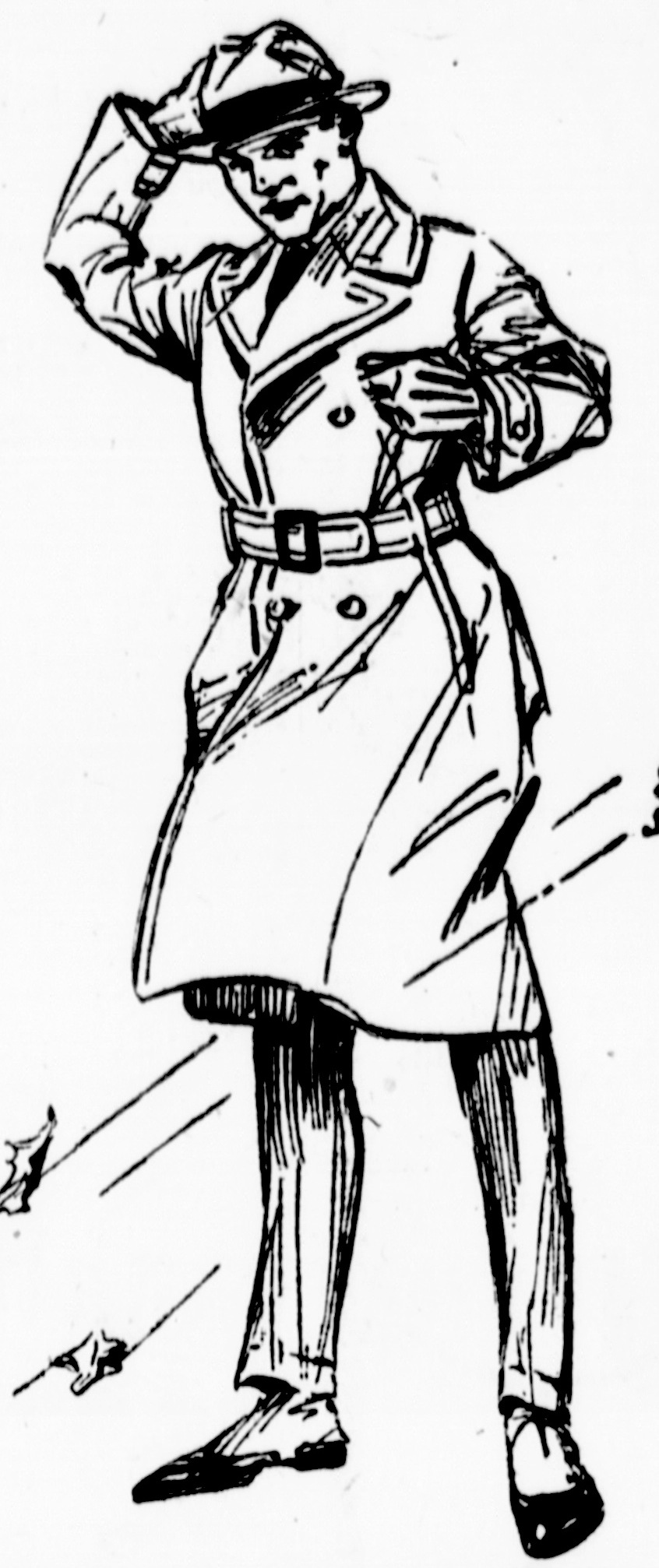
12 - 1917

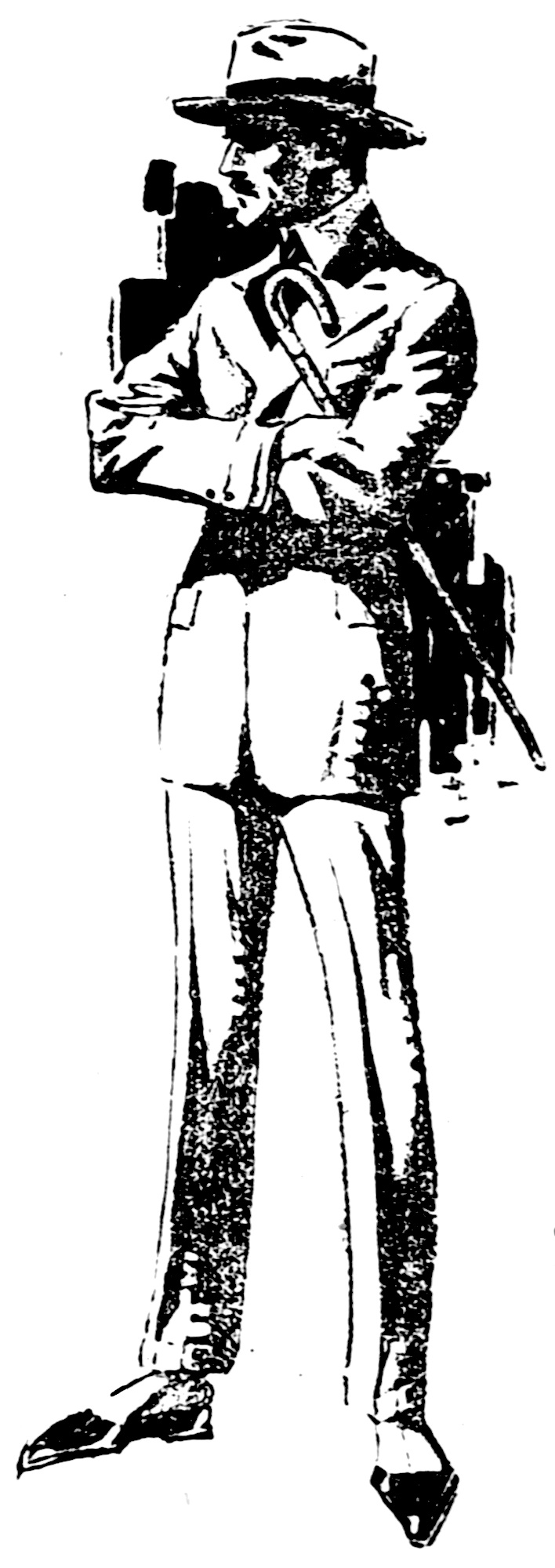
13 - 1918

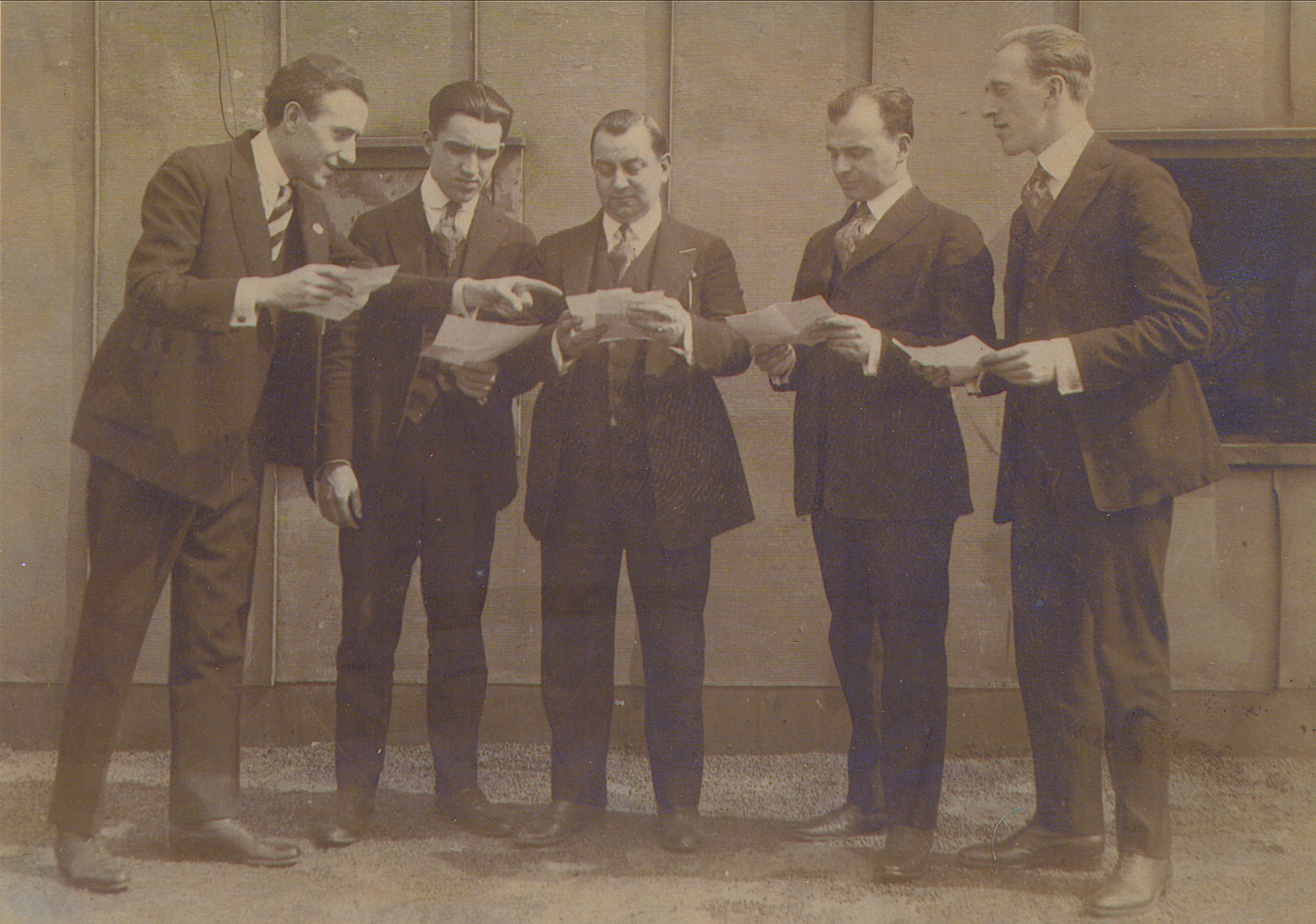
14 – 1919

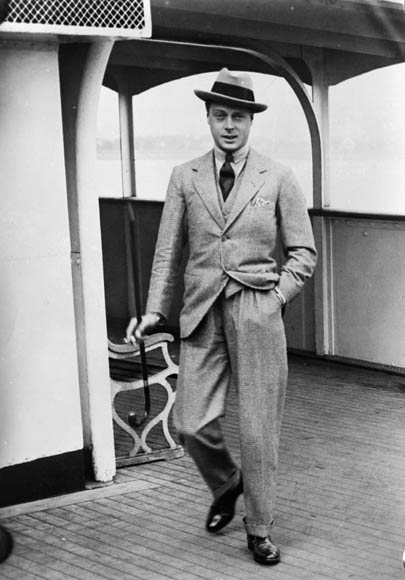
15 – 1919

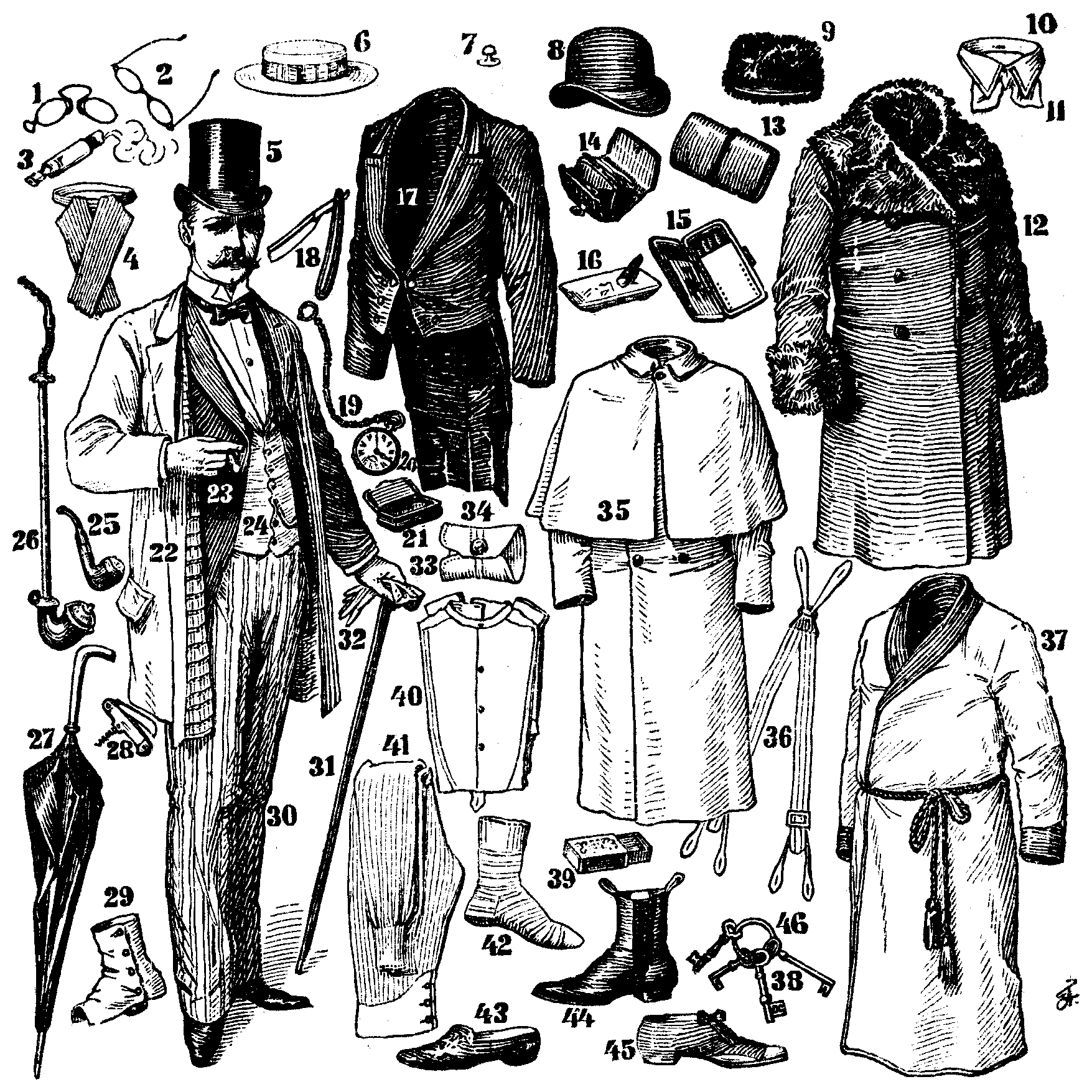
16 – 1919
1. Portrait of Bernhard Koehler shows a tall shirt collar worn with a wide tie, 1910
2. A man's suit – summer, 1911
3. Formal daywear includes wing-collared shirt, three-piece suit with wide lapels and pressed trousers, Germany, 1912
4. Portrait of Ludwik Żeleński wearing a three-piece suit with characteristic collarless vest or waistcoat. His shirt has a tall, stuff collar. Poland, 1912
5. Advertisement for men's sack suits, United States, 1912
6. Suit made of worsted Cheviot, 1912
7. Men's shoe fashion – summer, 1913
8. Fashion plate of 1914 show's man's overcoat worn with a Homburg hat and gaiters or spats. Note ankle-length creased or pressed trousers with cuffs.
9. Portrait of Wallace Beery shows stiff collared shirt, striped necktie, and two-piece suit popular in mid-decade, c. 1914
10. Photo from a newspaper titled "sea side fashion for men" – 1915
11. A man and his dog in the summer of 1916
12. Men's winter overcoat from 1917
13. Spring suit fashions in 1918
14. Members of the Louisiana Five jazz band wear three-piece suits, 1919. Courtesy of Nunez family collection.
15. Photo of The Prince of Wales in a three-piece suit with pleated, cuffed trousers, Homburg hat, 1919.
16. Men's clothing. Visual dictionary illustrations from a Swedish-German dictionary,1919.

== Working clothes ==
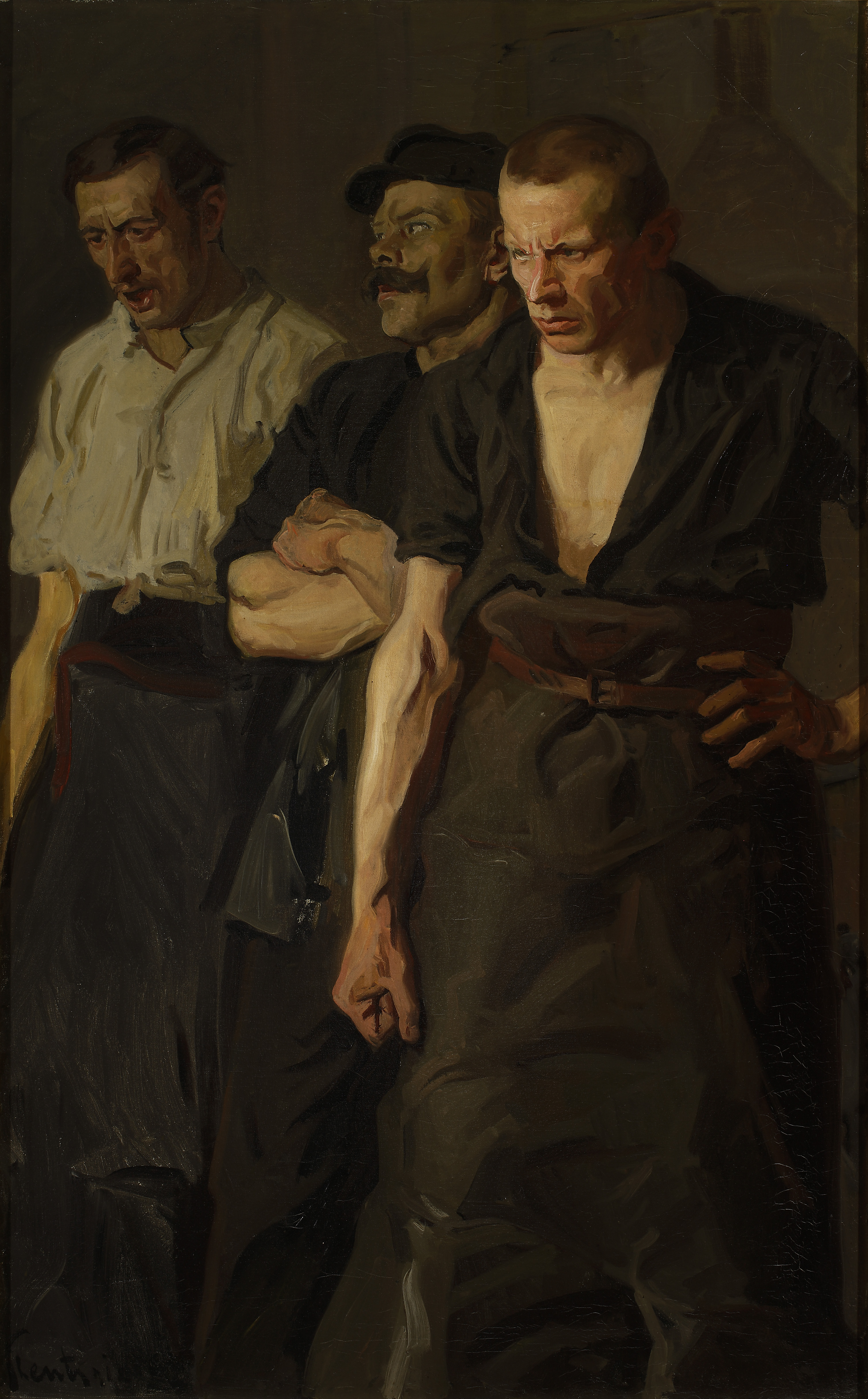
1 – 1910

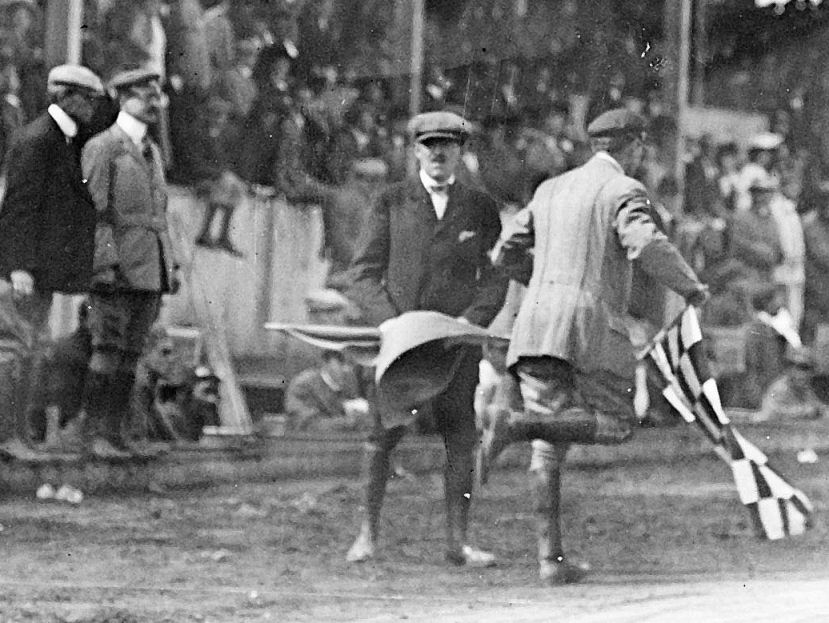
2 – 1910

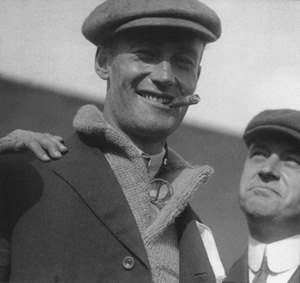
3 – 1911

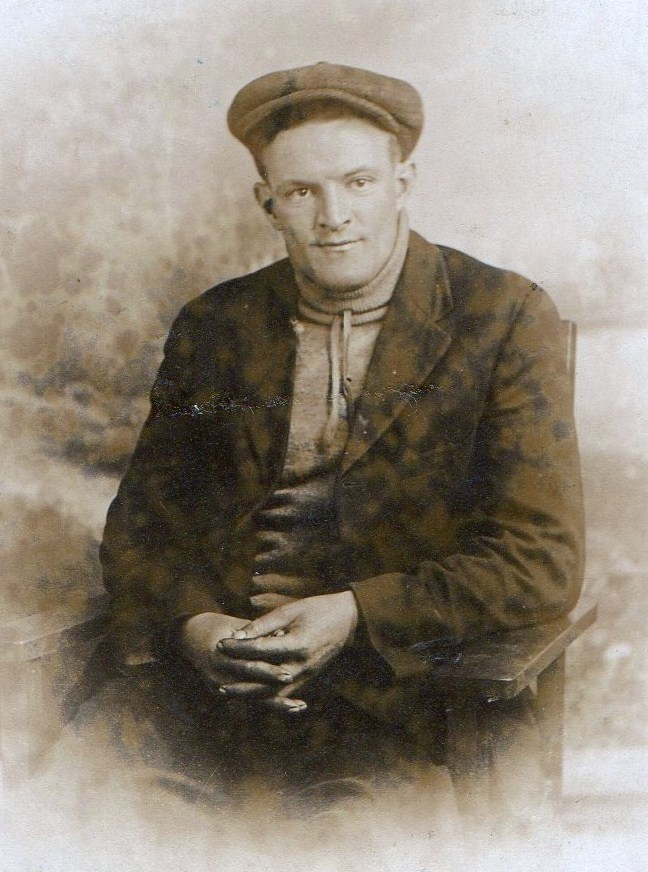
4 – 1912

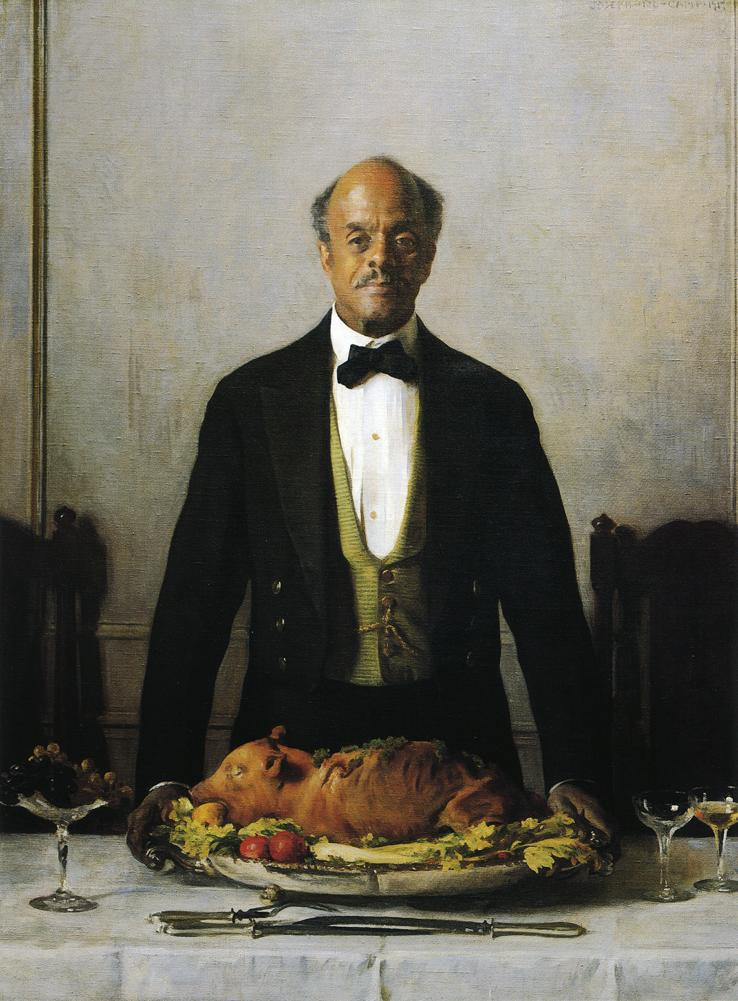
5 – 1919
1. Polish workers wear colored shirts with soft collars. The Strike, 1910
2. Raceway workers wear tall boots, breeches, and cloth caps. The second man from the left is wearing a Norfolk jacket, Long Island, New York, 1910.
3. Aviator Calbraith Perry Rodgers, 1911, in a casual wool cap.
4. Irish immigrant in Detroit, Michigan, wearing a jacket, woollen sweater, and cap, 1912.
5. The "formal" clothes worn by stewards, waiters, butlers and others "in service" included a black (not white) tie.

== Children's wear ==
Fashion for children in the 1910s evolved in two different directions, day-to-day and formal dress. Boys were dressed in suits with trousers that extended to the knee and girls' apparel began to become less "adult" as skirt lengths were shortened and features became more child-focused. The war affected the trends in general, as well. Military influences in apparel for little boys was typical and the lengths of skirts for girls were cut shorter yet because of material rationing. Boys wore short trousers even in winter.

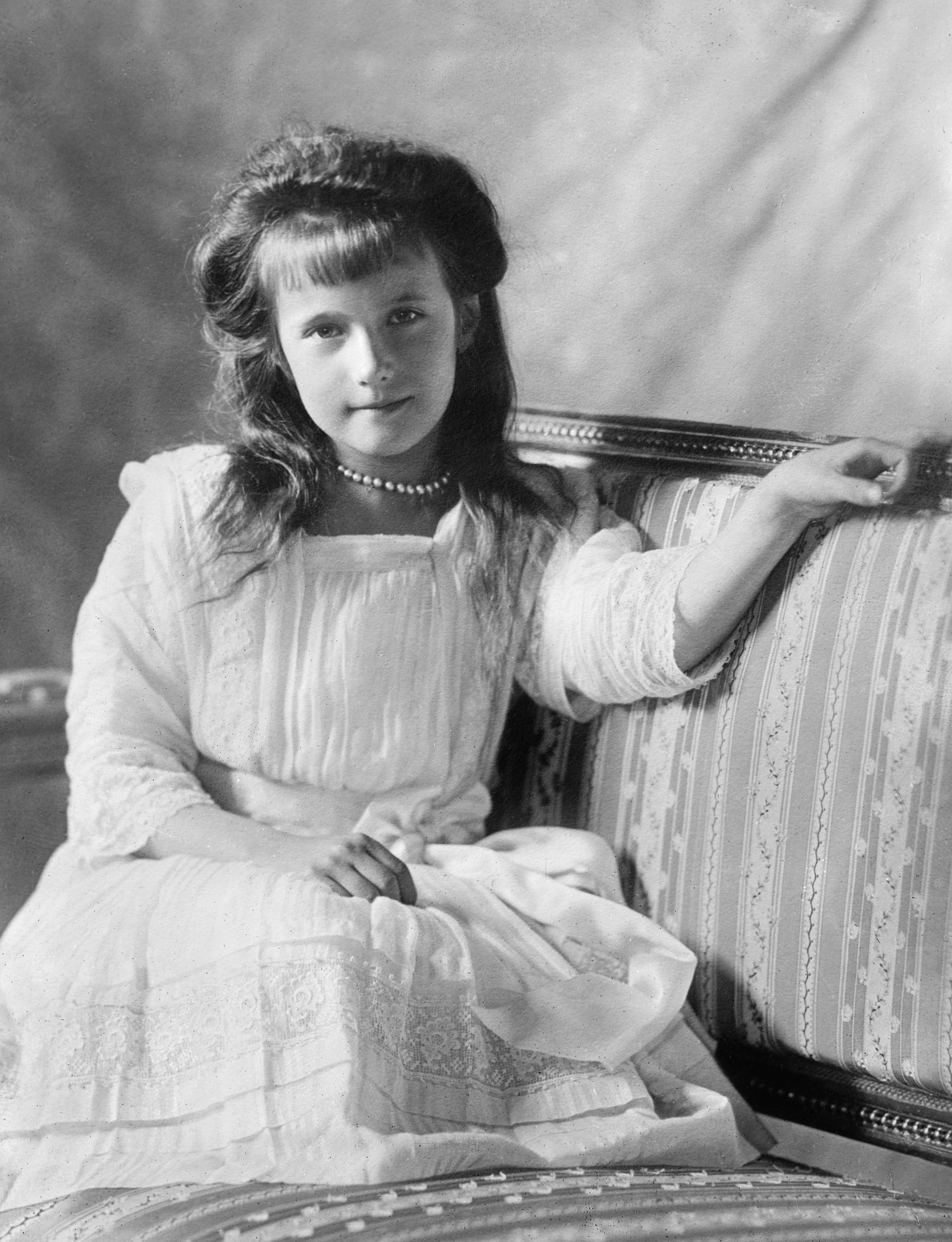
Grand Duchess Anastasia Nikolaevna, 1910

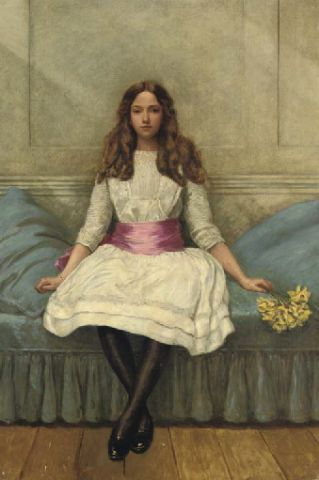
Portrait of Irene Spencer, 1912

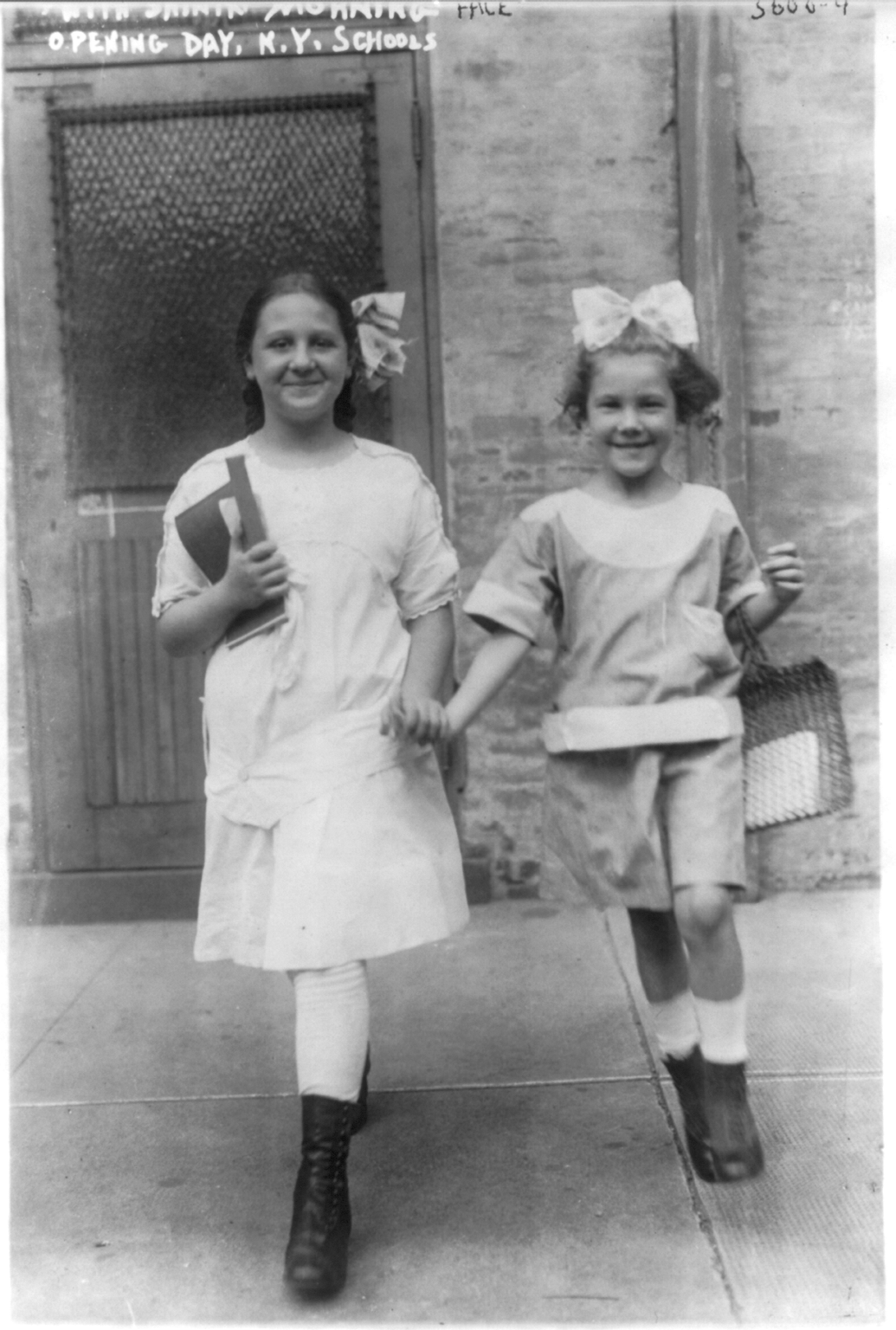
New York, 1915

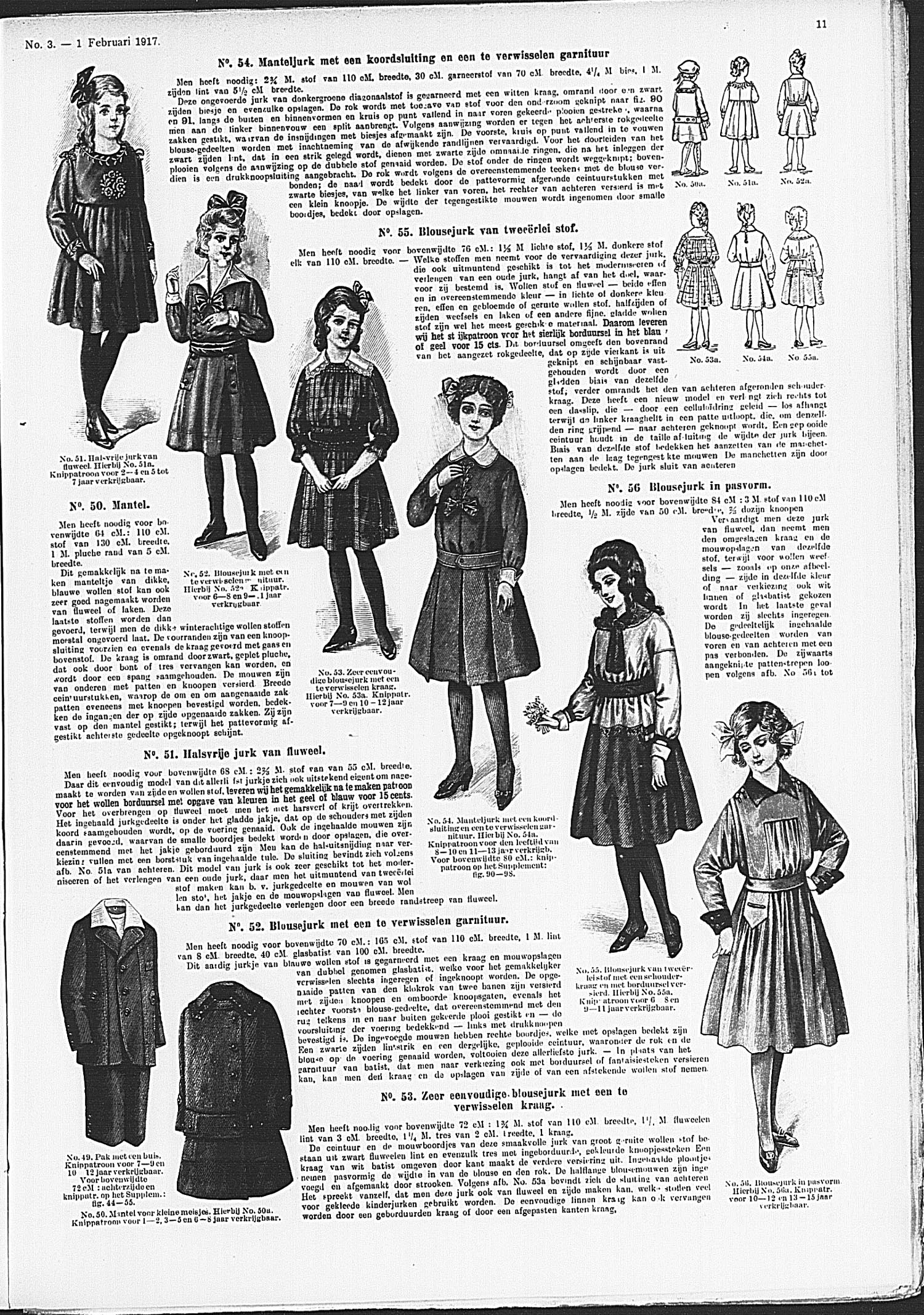
Dresses for girls, 1917

== See also ==
- Clothing in the Ragtime Era
- Dress code
